= Víctor Rivera (wrestler) =

Puerto Rican professional wrestler (born 1944)

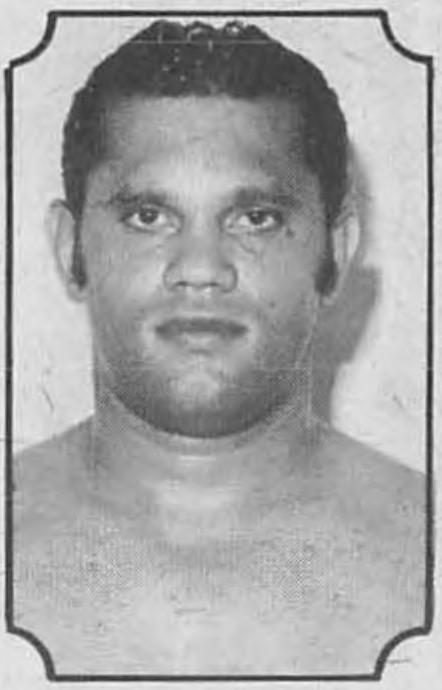
- Rivera, c. 1979

Personal information
- Born: May 25, 1944 (age 82) San Lorenzo, Puerto Rico

Professional wrestling career
- Ring name(s): Rico Pantera; Vic Rivera; Víctor Rivera
- Billed height: 6 ft 0 in (183 cm)
- Billed weight: 224 lb (102 kg)
- Billed from: Philadelphia, Pennsylvania; San Lorenzo, Puerto Rico
- Debut: 1964
- Retired: 1984

Víctor Rivera (born May 25, 1944) is a Puerto Rican retired professional wrestler. Worked for the World Wrestling Federation from 1964 to 1984 on numerous occasions. Between 1967 and 1981, he held the NWA Americas Tag Team Championship thirteen times, the NWA Americas Heavyweight Championship five times, the WWWF International Tag Team Championship, and numerous others.

== Professional wrestling career ==
Rivera debuted in 1964 for the World Wide Wrestling Federation.

In the late 1960s, Rivera wrestled in Los Angeles' Worldwide Wrestling Associates (which later became NWA Hollywood Wrestling in 1968), where he won the WWA World Tag Team Championship with Pedro Morales.

Rivera made his debut in the World Wide Wrestling Federation in 1968. In December 1969, Rivera teamed with Tony Marino at Madison Square Garden to win the WWWF International Tag Team Championship in two straight falls from Professor Toru Tanaka and Mitsu Arakawa. Rivera and Marino defended the belts successfully against teams like Killer Kowalski and Waldo Von Erich, as well as Kowalski and Krippler Karl Kovacs. They lost the championship to another undefeated team, The Mongols (Bepo and Geto Mongol) on June 15, 1970, two falls to one at Madison Square Garden. On May 13, 1975, Rivera and Dominic DeNucci won the WWWF World Tag Team Championship from The Valiant Brothers. That year, he also teamed with a rookie Dino Bravo to challenge The Mongols (Geto and Bolo Mongol) for the IWA World Tag Team Championship.

After leaving the WWWF, Rivera feuded with Pedro Morales in Hawaii and California. He also worked for in Japan. In 1978, he returned as a heel under manager "Classy" Freddie Blassie and challenged Bob Backlund for the WWWF Championship in several arenas, including the Philadelphia Spectrum. He left again in 1979. In 1980, Rivera was once again wrestling in the Los Angeles territory of the National Wrestling Alliance, when he won its NWA World Tag Team Championship with Enforcer Luciano. In 1981, Rivera returned to Japan.

Then in 1982, Riviera returned to WWWF now WWF worked as an enhancement talent until 1984 when he retired from wrestling.

== Professional wrestling style and persona ==
Rivera wrestled in a "technical" style. His signature moves were the abdominal stretch, the cannonball, and the dropkick.

== Championships and accomplishments ==
- All-California Championship Wrestling
  - ACCW Heavyweight Championship (3 times)
- California Pro Wrestling
  - CPW Heavyweight Championship (1 time)
  - CPW Brass Knuckles Championship (2 times)
- NWA Hollywood Wrestling
  - NWA World Tag Team Championship (Los Angeles version) (1 time) - with Enforcer Lusciano
  - NWA Americas Heavyweight Championship (6 times)
  - NWA Americas Tag Team Championship (13 times) - with Pedro Morales (2), Raul Reyes (1), Raul Mata (1), Porkchop Cash (1), Dino Bravo (1), Cien Caras (1), Terry Sawyer (1), Chavo Guerrero (1), Texas Red (1), Allen Coage (2), Salvatore Bellomo (1),
  - NWA "Beat the Champ" Television Championship (2 times)
- National Wrestling Federation
  - NWF Heavyweight Championship (1 time)
- Western States Alliance
  - WSA Heavyweight Championship (1 time)
  - WSA Beat The Champ Championship (1 time)
  - WSA Tag Team Championship (1 time) - with John Tolos
- World Wide Wrestling Federation
  - WWWF International Tag Team Championship (1 time) - with Tony Marino
  - WWWF World Tag Team Championship (1 time) - with Dominic DeNucci
