= NWA Americas Tag Team Championship =

Professional wrestling tag team championship

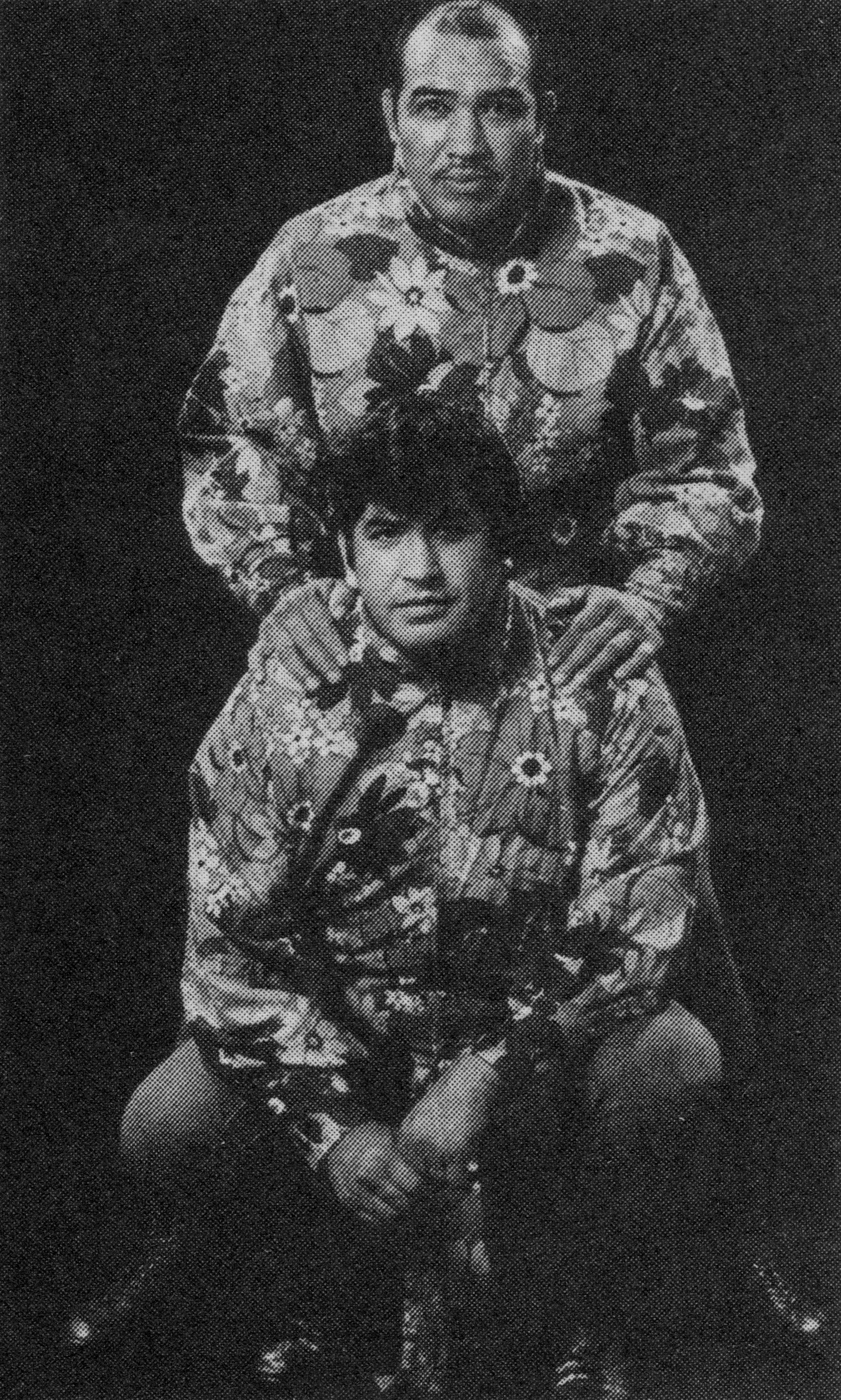
- The team of Black Gordman and Great Goliath, who hold the record for most reigns with the championship

Details
- Promotion: NWA Hollywood Wrestling
- Date established: February, 1964
- Date retired: December 26, 1982

Other name
- WWA World Tag Team Championship
Statistics
- First champions: Édouard Carpentier and Ernie Ladd
- Most reigns: Black Gordman and Great Goliath (22 reigns) (as individual) Black Gordman (31 reigns)
- Longest reign: Black Gordman and Great Goliath (187 days)
- Shortest reign: Black Gordman and Rocky Montero, Ángel Blanco and Dr. Wagner, Chavo Guerrero and John Tolos, Chavo and Gory Guerrero, and The Twin Devils, (1 day)

The NWA Americas Tag Team Championship was a professional wrestling tag team title in the National Wrestling Alliance's NWA Hollywood Wrestling based out of Los Angeles, California.

The championship began as the WWA World Tag Team Championship for Worldwide Wrestling Associates in 1964. However, when WWA became an NWA affiliate on October 1, 1968, its name was changed to NWA Hollywood Wrestling and the title was renamed the NWA Americas Tag Team Championship in January 1969. The title served as the top tag team championship in the promotion until 1979 when it was relegated to serve as a secondary tag title since the company created its own regional version of the NWA World Tag Team Championship. The championship lasted until the promotion closed on December 26, 1982.

== Title history ==
Key
No.	Overall reign number
Reign	Reign number for the specific team—reign numbers for the individuals are in parentheses, if different
Days	Number of days held

No.	Champion	Championship change			Reign statistics		Notes	Ref.
No.	Champion	Date	Event	Location	Reign	Days	Notes	Ref.
WWA World Tag Team Championship
1	Édouard Carpentier and Ernie Ladd	February 1, 1964	WWA show	San Bernardino, California	1	26	Previously WWA International Television Tag Team Championship.	
2	The Fabulous Kangaroos (Al Costello and Roy Heffernan)	February 27, 1964	WWA show	Bakersfield, California	1	61		
3	Torres Brothers (Alberto and Ramon Torres)	April 28, 1964	WWA show	Long Beach, California	1	93		
4	The Destroyer and Hard Boiled Haggerty	July 30, 1964	WWA show	Bakersfield, California	1	89		
5	Freddie Blassie and Mr. Moto	October 27, 1964	WWA show	Long Beach, California	1	7		
6	The Destroyer (2) and Hard Boiled Haggerty (2)	November 3, 1964	WWA show	Long Beach, California	2	36		
7	Édouard Carpentier (2) and Bob Ellis	December 9, 1964	WWA show	Los Angeles, California	1	89		
8	The Von Stroheims (Karl and Kurt Von Stroheim)	March 8, 1965	WWA show	N/A	1	66	Pedro Morales and Luis Hernandez defeat the Von Stroheims on April 24, 1965, in San Bernardino, California, but the Von Stroheims defend the title in Los Angeles, California, on the following day.	
9	The Assassins (Assassin #1 and Assassin #2)	May 13, 1965	WWA show	Los Angeles, California	1	87		
10	The Kentuckians (Luke Brown and Grizzly Smith)	August 8, 1965	WWA show	Los Angeles, California	1	30		
11	The Assassins (Assassin #1 and Assassin #2)	September 7, 1965	WWA show	Long Beach, California	2	7		
12	The Kentuckians (Luke Brown and Grizzly Smith)	September 14, 1965	WWA show	Long Beach, California	2	435	This title change was repeated two days later in Bakersfield, California.	
13	Luke Graham and Gorilla Monsoon	November 23, 1966	WWA show	Los Angeles, California	1	61		
14	El Mongol and Gorilla Monsoon (2)	January 23, 1967	WWA show	Los Angeles, California	1	17	Defeated Luke Graham and Moondog Mayne.	
15	Thunderbolt Patterson and Alberto Torres (2)	February 9, 1966	WWA show	Los Angeles, California	1	68		
16	Buddy Austin and El Mongol (2)	April 18, 1966	WWA show	Los Angeles, California	1	67		
17	Luis Hernandez and Pedro Morales	June 24, 1966	WWA show	Los Angeles, California	1	126		
18	El Shereef and Hard Boiled Haggerty (3)	October 28, 1966	WWA show	Los Angeles, California	1	43		
19	Mark Lewin and Pedro Morales (2)	December 10, 1966	WWA show	Los Angeles, California	1	24		
20	El Shereef (2) and Hard Boiled Haggerty (4)	January 3, 1967	WWA show	N/A	2	38		
21	Pedro Morales (3) and Ricky Romero	February 10, 1967	WWA show	Los Angeles, California	1	98		
22	Mike DiBiase and Killer Karl Kox	May 19, 1967	WWA show	Los Angeles, California	1	30		
23	Kim Il and Mr. Moto (2)	June 18, 1967	WWA show	N/A	1	11		
24	Pedro Morales (4) and Ricky Romero (2)	June 29, 1967	WWA show	N/A	2	1		
25	Mike DiBiase (2) and Karl Gotch	June 30, 1967	WWA show	Los Angeles, California	1	N/A		
—	Vacated	September 13, 1967	WWA show	—	—	—	Title Held up after a match against Pedro Morales and Victor Rivera.	
26	Pedro Morales (5) and Victor Rivera	July 29, 1967	N/A	San Bernardino, California	1	7	Wins the rematch.	
27	Mike DiBiase (3) and Karl Gotch (2)	August 5, 1967	WWA show	San Bernardino, California	2	28		
28	Pedro Morales (6) and Victor Rivera (2)	September 2, 1967	WWA show	N/A	2	18		
29	Buddy Austin (2) and Freddie Blassie (2)	September 20, 1967	WWA show	Los Angeles, California	1	72		
30	Pedro Morales (7) and Antonio Pugliese	December 1, 1967	WWA show	Los Angeles, California	1	14		
31	Buddy Austin and Freddie Blassie (3)	December 15, 1967	WWA show	Los Angeles, California	2	141		
32	The Medics (I and II)	May 4, 1968	WWA show	Los Angeles, California	1	N/A		
NWA Americas Tag Team Championship
33	Freddie Blassie (4) and Crybaby Cannon	November 7, 1968	WWA show	Bakersfield, California	1	N/A		
34	The Medics (I and II)	December 1968	WWA show	N/A	2	N/A		
35	Paul Jones and Nelson Royal	January 24, 1969	WWA show	Los Angeles, California	1	14		
36	Black Gordman and Pepper Gomez	February 7, 1969	WWA show	Los Angeles, California	1	36		
37	The Black Angels	March 15, 1969	WWA show	San Bernardino, California	1	19		
38	Alfonso Dantés and Mil Máscaras	April 3, 1969	WWA show	Los Angeles, California	1	41	Repeated on April 5, 1969, in San Bernardino, California, as WWA title (Black Angels may have regained on April 4, 1969.	
39	Black Gordman (2) and Apache Bull Ramos	May 14, 1969	WWA show	Los Angeles, California	1	7		
40	Alfonso Dantés (2) and Francisco Flores	May 21, 1969	WWA show	Los Angeles, California	1	21		
41	Black Gordman (3) and Chris Markoff	June 11, 1969	WWA show	Los Angeles, California	1	24		
42	Mil Máscaras (2) and Alfonso Dantés (3)	July 5, 1969	WWA show	San Bernardino, California	2	19		
43	Black Gordman (4) and Apache Bull Ramos (2)	July 24, 1969	WWA show	Los Angeles, California	2	37		
44	The Medics (I and II)	August 30, 1969	WWA show	San Bernardino, California	3	N/A		
—	Vacated	October 1969	—	—	—	—	Medico #2 is forced to leave for Mexico	
45	Don Carson and Great Kojika	October 1969	WWA show	N/A	1	N/A	Sometime after October 17, 1969.	
46	Pepe Lopez and El Medico (4)	December 1, 1969	WWA show	Ventura, California	1	46	Carson and Kojika defend the title against Medico and Lopez on December 13, 1969, in California (or the newspaper mistakenly reports as such).	
47	Freddie Blassie (5) and Don Carson (2)	January 16, 1970	WWA show	Los Angeles, California	1	N/A		
—	Vacated	March 25, 1970	—	—	—	—	Blassie and Carson split up.	
49	Pantera Negra and Tony Rocco	April 8, 1970	WWA show	Los Angeles, California	1	65	Defeated Karl Helsinger and Kinji Shibuya in an 8 man tournament final to win the vacant title.	
50	Great Kojika (2) and John Tolos	June 12, 1970	WWA show	Los Angeles, California	1	8		
51	Pantera Negra (2) and Tony Rocco (2)	June 20, 1970	WWA show	Los Angeles, California	2	N/A		
52	Great Kojika (3) and John Tolos (2)	July 1970	WWA show	N/A	2	N/A		
53	Pantera Negra (3) and Tony Rocco (3)	July 15, 1970	WWA show	Los Angeles, California	3	24		
54	Black Gordman (4) and Rocky Montero	August 8, 1970	WWA show	San Diego, California	1	32		
55	Rocky Johnson and Earl Maynard	September 9, 1970	WWA show	Los Angeles, California	1	8		
56	The Medics (I (5) and II (4))	September 17, 1970	WWA show	Bakersfield, California	4	N/A		
57	Black Gordman (5) and Great Goliath	October 10, 1970	WWA show	Bakersfield, California	1	17		
58	The Medics (I (6) and II (5))	October 27, 1970	WWA show	San Diego, California	5	30		
59	Black Gordman (6) and Great Goliath (2)	November 26, 1970	WWA show	Bakersfield, California	2	50	Medicos are billed as Pacific Coast champions on December 5, 1970, in San Bernardino, California.	
60	Mil Máscaras (3) and Ray Mendoza	January 15, 1971	WWA show	Bakersfield, California	1	14		
61	Black Gordman (7) and Great Goliath (3)	January 29, 1971	WWA show	Los Angeles, California	3	98		
62	Masa Saito and Kinji Shibuya	May 7, 1971	WWA show	Los Angeles, California	1	14		
63	Black Gordman (8) and Great Goliath (4)	May 21, 1971	WWA show	Los Angeles, California	4	98		
64	Masa Saito (2) and Kinji Shibuya (2)	August 27, 1971	WWA show	Los Angeles, California	2	14		
65	Black Gordman (9) and Great Goliath (5)	September 10, 1971	WWA show	Los Angeles, California	5	33		
66	Salvador Lothario and Pantera Negra (3)	October 13, 1971	WWA show	N/A	1	37		
67	Masa Saito (3) and Kinji Shibuya (3)	November 19, 1971	WWA show	Los Angeles, California	3	18		
68	Earl Maynard (2) and Frankie Laine	December 7, 1971	WWA show	San Diego, California	1	7		
69	Masa Saito (4) and Kinji Shibuya (4)	December 14, 1971	WWA show	San Diego, California	4	45	In Bakersfield, California, Shibuya and Saito lose to La Pantera Negra and Salvador Lothario on December 9, 1971, and regain on December 16, 1971.	
70	Dory Dixon and Earl Maynard (3)	January 28, 1972	WWA show	Los Angeles, California	1	33		
71	Great Goliath (6) and Kinji Shibuya (5)	March 1, 1972	WWA show	Los Angeles, California	1	48		
72	Dory Dixon (2) and Raul Mata	April 18, 1972	WWA show	Costa Mesa, California	1	7		
73	Killer Kowalski and Kinji Shibuya (6)	April 25, 1972	WWA show	Costa Mesa, California	1	10		
74	Raul Mata (2) and Ray Mendoza (2)	May 5, 1972	WWA show	Los Angeles, California	1	N/A		
75	Raul Mata (3) and Salvador Lothario	June 1972	WWA show	N/A	1	N/A	Lothario Replaces Mendoza.	
76	Masa Saito(5) and Kinji Shibuya (7)	June 30, 1972	WWA show	Los Angeles, California	5	61		
77	Eric Froelich and Reuben Juarez	August 30, 1972	WWA show	Los Angeles, California	1	N/A		
—	Vacated	September 14, 1972	—	—	—	—	Title Held up after a match against Rocky Montero and Jan Madrid	
78	Eric Froelich and Reuben Juarez	September 21, 1972	WWA show	Bakersfield, California	2	50		
79	Black Gordman (10) and Great Goliath (7)	November 10, 1972	WWA show	Los Angeles, California	6	91		
80	Raul Mata (4) and David Morgan	February 9, 1973	WWA show	Los Angeles, California	1	61		
81	Ripper Collins and Gordon Nelson	April 11, 1973	WWA show	Los Angeles, California	1	23		
82	Ray Mendoza (3) and Raul Reyes	May 4, 1973	WWA show	Los Angeles, California	1	14		
83	Black Gordman (11) and Great Goliath (8)	May 18, 1973	WWA show	Los Angeles, California	7	12		
84	Ray Mendoza (4) and Raul Reyes (2)	May 30, 1973	WWA show	San Bernardino, California	2	2		
85	Black Gordman (12) and Great Goliath (9)	June 1, 1973	WWA show	Los Angeles, California	8	42		
86	Raul Reyes (3) and Victor Rivera (3)	July 13, 1973	WWA show	Los Angeles, California	1	33		
87	Pak Song and Mr. Wrestling	August 15, 1973	WWA show	Los Angeles, California	1	9		
88	Raul Reyes (4) and Reuben Juarez (3)	August 24, 1973	WWA show	Los Angeles, California	1	N/A		
89	Great Yamamoto and Colosso Colosetti	October 1973	WWA show	N/A	1	N/A		
90	Raul Reyes (5) and Raul Mata (5)	October 27, 1973	WWA show	Hollywood, California	1	41		
91	Dr. and Mr. Wrestling (2)	December 7, 1973	WWA show	Hollywood, California	1	14		
92	Raul Mata (6) and Victor Rivera (4)	December 21, 1973	WWA show	Hollywood, California	1	28		
93	Black Gordman (13) and Great Goliath (10)	January 18, 1974	WWA show	Los Angeles, California	9	187		
94	Porkchop Cash and Manny Soto	July 24, 1974	WWA show	Los Angeles, California	1	37		
95	Ángel Blanco and Dr. Wagner	August 30, 1974	WWA show	Los Angeles, California	1	1		
96	Butcher Brannigan and Mountain Man Mike	August 31, 1974	WWA show	Hollywood, California	1	14		
97	Porkchop Cash (2) and Victor Rivera (5)	September 14, 1974	WWA show	Hollywood, California	1	28		
98	Otto Von Heller and Kurt Von Hess	October 12, 1974	WWA show	Hollywood, California	1	N/A		
—	Vacated	October 19, 1974	—	—	—	—		
99	Dino Bravo and Victor Rivera (6)	October 25, 1974	WWA show	Los Angeles, California	1	42	Defeated Raul Reyes and Tony Rocco to win the vacant title.	
100	The Hollywood Blonds (Jerry Brown and Buddy Roberts)	December 6, 1974	WWA show	Los Angeles, California	1	42	Defeated Victor Rivera and Louie Tillet, after Bravo leaves the team to challenge for the Americas Heavyweight Championship.	
101	Porkchop Cash (3) and S. D. Jones	January 17, 1975	WWA show	Los Angeles, California	1	7		
102	The Hollywood Blonds (Jerry Brown and Buddy Roberts)	January 24, 1975	WWA show	Los Angeles, California	2	35		
103	Louie Tillet and John Tolos (3)	February 28, 1975	WWA show	Los Angeles, California	1	22		
104	The Hollywood Blonds (Jerry Brown and Buddy Roberts)	March 22, 1975	WWA show	Hollywood, California	3	83		
105	Black Gordman (14) and Great Goliath (11)	June 13, 1975	WWA show	Los Angeles, California	10	42		
106	The Hollywood Blonds (Jerry Brown and Buddy Roberts)	July 25, 1975	WWA show	Los Angeles, California	4	14		
107	Black Gordman (15) and Great Goliath (12)	August 8, 1975	WWA show	Los Angeles, California	11	14		
108	Chavo Guerrero and Raul Mata (7)	August 22, 1975	WWA show	Los Angeles, California	1	21		
109	The Infernos	September 12, 1975	WWA show	N/A	1	21		
110	Chavo Guerrero (2) and Raul Mata (8)	October 3, 1975	WWA show	N/A	2	26		
111	The Infernos	October 29, 1975	WWA show	N/A	2	34		
112	Black Gordman (16) and Great Goliath (13)	December 2, 1975	WWA show	San Diego, California	12	7		
113	Mickey Doyle and Mando Lopez	December 9, 1975	WWA show	N/A	1	7		
114	Rock Riddle and John Tolos (4)	December 16, 1975	WWA show	N/A	1	14		
115	Black Gordman (17) and Great Goliath (14)	December 30, 1975	WWA show	N/A	13	45		
116	Chavo Guerrero (3) and John Tolos (5)	February 13, 1976	WWA show	Los Angeles, California	1	1		
117	Karl Von Brauner and Senor X	February 14, 1976	WWA show	N/A	1	13		
118	Los Guerreros (Chavo (4) and Gory)	February 27, 1976	WWA show	N/A	1	1		
119	Roddy Piper and Crusher Verdu	February 28, 1976	WWA show	N/A	1	145	Still/again champion as of May 13, 1976.	
120	Crusher Verdu (2) and Frank Monte	July 22, 1976	WWA show	N/A	1	15		
121	Butcher Vachon and Chavo Guerrero (5)	August 6, 1976	WWA show	Los Angeles, California	1	7		
122	Porkchop Cash (4) and Frank Monte (2)	August 13, 1976	WWA show	Los Angeles, California	1	8		
123	The Scorpions (I and II (6))	August 21, 1976	WWA show	San Bernardino, California	1	34	Scorpion II formerly known as Raúl Reyes.	
124	Carlos and Raul Mata (9)	September 24, 1976	N/A	Los Angeles, California	1	35		
125	The Hangman and Roddy Piper (2)	October 29, 1976	WWA show	N/A	1	84		
126	Cien Caras and Victor Rivera (7)	January 21, 1977	WWA show	N/A	1	21		
127	Dr. Hiro Ota (Yasu Fuji) and Toru Tanaka	February 11, 1977	WWA show	N/A	1	19		
128	Victor Rivera (8) and Terry Sawyer	March 2, 1977	WWA show	N/A	1	2		
129	Black Gordman (18) and Great Goliath (15)	March 4, 1977	WWA show	N/A	14	14		
130	Chavo Guerrero (6) and Victor Rivera (9)	March 18, 1977	WWA show	N/A	1	N/A		
131	Keith Franks and Black Gordman (19)	1977	WWA show	N/A	1	N/A	Sometime between April 10, 1977 and April 24, 1977.	
132	Mando Guerrero and Tom Jones	April 25, 1977	WWA show	N/A	1	88	Chavo Guerrero and Mando Guerrero are billed as champions on April 26, 1977, in San Diego, California.	
133	Keith Franks (2) and Roddy Piper (3)	July 22, 1977	WWA show	N/A	1	7		
134	Mando Guerrero (2) and Tom Jones (2)	July 29, 1977	WWA show	N/A	2	21		
135	Black Gordman (20) and Great Goliath (16)	August 19, 1977	WWA show	N/A	15	30		
136	Tom (3) and S. D. Jones (2)	September 18, 1977	WWA show	N/A	1	5		
137	Black Gordman (21) and Great Goliath (17)	September 23, 1977	WWA show	N/A	16	28		
138	Texas Red and Victor Rivera (10)	October 21, 1977	WWA show	N/A	1	7		
139	Black Gordman (22) and Great Goliath (18)	October 28, 1977	WWA show	N/A	17	N/A		
140	The Canadian (4) and Chavo Guerrero (7)	1977	WWA show	N/A	1	N/A		
141	Black Gordman (23) and Great Goliath (19)	November 2, 1977	WWA show	N/A	18	6		
142	Tom (4) and S. D. Jones (3)	November 8, 1977	WWA show	N/A	2	1		
143	Black Gordman (24) and Great Goliath (20)	November 9, 1977	WWA show	San Diego, California	19	65		
144	Los Guerreros (Chavo (8) and Hector)	January 13, 1978	WWA show	Los Angeles, California	1	23		
145	Ron Bass and Dr. Hiro Ota (2)	February 5, 1978	WWA show	N/A	1	19		
146	Chavo Guerrero (9) and El Halcón	February 24, 1978	WWA show	N/A	1	14		
147	Ron Bass (2) and Moondog Lonnie Mayne	March 10, 1978	WWA show	N/A	1	21		
148	Black Gordman (25) and Chavo Guerrero (10)	March 31, 1978	WWA show	N/A	1	21		
149	Ron Bass (3) and Roddy Piper (5)	April 21, 1978	WWA show	Los Angeles, California	1	35		
150	Black Gordman (26) and Hector Guerrero (2)	May 26, 1978	WWA show	Los Angeles, California	1	28		
151	Pak Choo and Mr. Ito (Masao Ito)	June 23, 1978	WWA show	N/A	1	49		
152	Black Gordman (27) and Ryuma Go	August 11, 1978	WWA show	N/A	1	21		
153	Pak Choo (2) and Roddy Piper (6)	September 1, 1978	WWA show	N/A	1	N/A		
154	The Twin Devils	1978	WWA show	N/A	1	N/A		
155	Black Gordman (28) and Great Goliath (21)	November 17, 1978	WWA show	Los Angeles, California	20	21		
156	The Twin Devils	December 8, 1978	WWA show	N/A	2	56		
157	Chavo Guerrero (11) and Tatsumi Fujinami	February 2, 1979	WWA show	Los Angeles, California	1	7		
158	The Twin Devils	February 9, 1979	WWA show	Los Angeles, California	3	91		
159	Hector Guerrero (3) and Barry Orton	May 11, 1979	WWA show	Los Angeles, California	1	7		
160	Jonathan Boyd and Coloso Colosetti (2)	May 18, 1979	WWA show	Los Angeles, California	1	1		
161	The Twin Devils	May 19, 1979	WWA show	Fresno, California	4	32		
162	Gibson Brothers (Ricky and Robert Gibson)	June 20, 1979	WWA show	N/A	1	8		
163	The Twin Devils	June 28, 1979	WWA show	N/A	5	1		
164	Los Guerreros (Hector (4) and Mando (3))	June 29, 1979	WWA show	N/A	1	7		
165	The Twin Devils	July 6, 1979	WWA show	Bakersfield, California	6	N/A		
166	Los Guerreros (Hector (5) and Mando (4))	1979	WWA show	N/A	2	N/A	Billed as champions in San Bernardino, California, on July 8, 1978 (Twin Devils' win in Bakersfield on July 5, 1979, may not be for the title).	
167	Leroy Brown and Allen Coage	August 4, 1979	WWA show	Los Angeles, California	1	27		
168	Mando Guerrero (5) and Carlos Mata (2)	August 31, 1979	WWA show	Los Angeles, California	1	28		
169	The Twin Devils	September 28, 1979	WWA show	N/A	7	14		
170	Allen Coage (2) and Victor Rivera (11)	October 12, 1979	WWA show	Los Angeles, California	1	14		
171	Chavo Guerrero (10) and Al Madril	October 26, 1979	WWA show	N/A	1	7		
172	Allen Coage (3) and Victor Rivera (12)	November 2, 1979	WWA show	N/A	2	43		
173	Mando Guerrero (5) and Al Madril (2)	December 15, 1979	WWA show	N/A	1	48		
174	Jack and Ray Evans	February 1, 1980	WWA show	N/A	1	N/A	Still champions as of February 22, 1980.	
—	Vacated	N/A	—	—	—	—		
175	John and Rick Davidson	February 27, 1980	WWA show	Los Angeles, California	1	N/A	Defeated Chris Adams and Tom Prichard.	
—	Vacated	N/A	—	—	—	—		
176	Jack and Ray Evans	March 30, 1980	WWA show	N/A	2	1		
177	Apolo Jalisco and Tom Prichard	March 31, 1980	WWA show	Bakersfield, California	1	N/A		
178	Al Madril (3) and Chief Running Hill	April 1980	WWA show	N/A	1	N/A		
179	The Spoiler and The Hood	April 11, 1980	WWA show	N/A	1	N/A		
180	Apolo Jalisco and Tom Prichard	April 1980	WWA show	N/A	2	N/A		
181	Jack Evans (3) and Pampero Firpo	April 25, 1980	WWA show	N/A	1	19		
182	Al Madril (4) and Tom Prichard (3)	May 14, 1980	WWA show	N/A	1	2		
183	Ox Baker and Enforcer Luciano	May 16, 1980	WWA show	N/A	1	N/A		
184	Al Madril (5) and Tom Prichard (4)	1980	WWA show	N/A	2	N/A		
185	The Assassin (3) and John Tolos (6)	December 12, 1980	WWA show	N/A	1	N/A		
—	Vacated	1981	—	—	—	—		
186	Chris Adams and Tom Prichard (5)	February 13, 1981	WWA show	N/A	1	28	Defeat El Mongol and Mike Masters.	
187	John and Rick Davidson	March 13, 1981	WWA show	Los Angeles, California	2	53		
188	Salvatore Bellomo and Victor Rivera (13)	May 5, 1981	WWA show	San Jose, California	1	N/A		
189	John and Rick Davidson	1981	WWA show	N/A	3	N/A		
190	Chino Chou and Gene LeBell	July 24, 1981	WWA show	N/A	1	N/A		
191	John and Rick Davidson	1981	WWA show	N/A	4	N/A		
192	Mario and Joel Valenzuela	1981	WWA show	N/A	1	N/A		
193	John and Rick Davidson	1981	WWA show	N/A	5	N/A		
194	Chino Chou (2) and The Kiss	1981	WWA show	N/A	1	N/A		
195	Brazo de Oro and Brazo de Plata	November 7, 1981	WWA show	N/A	1	N/A		
196	Carlos Mata (3) and The Kiss (2)	1982	WWA show	N/A	1	N/A	Sometime between November 8, 1981 and November 28, 1981.	
197	Black Gordman (29) and Great Goliath (22)	December 6, 1981	WWA show	N/A	21	63		
198	Carlos Mata (4) and The Kiss (3)	February 7, 1982	WWA show	N/A	2	5		
199	The Scorpions (I (2) and II (7))	February 12, 1982	WWA show	Los Angeles, California	2	N/A		
200	Killer Kim and Bobby Lane	April 1982	WWA show	N/A	1	N/A		
201	Chris Adams (2) and Ringo Rigby	April 4, 1982	WWA show	N/A	1	33		
202	Timothy Flowers and Adrian Street	May 7, 1982	WWA show	N/A	1	56		
203	Black Gordman (30) and Great Goliath (23)	July 2, 1982	WWA show	N/A	22	N/A		
204	Ryuma Go (2) and Mr. Toyo	1982	WWA show	Las Vegas, Nevada	1	N/A		
205	Los Guerreros (Hector (6) and Mando (6))	July 9, 1982	WWA show	Los Angeles, California	3	N/A		
206	Timothy Flowers and Adrian Street	August 1982	WWA show	N/A	2	N/A		
207	The Flores Brothers (Russo and Chico Flores)	1982	WWA show	N/A	1	N/A		
208	Los Guerreros (Hector (7) and Mando (7))	1982	WWA show	N/A	4	N/A		
209	Black Gordman (31) and Master Lee	November 12, 1982	WWA show	Los Angeles, California	1	N/A		
—	Deactivated	December 26, 1982	—	—	—	—	NWA Hollywood closed	

== See also ==
- National Wrestling Alliance
- NWA Americas Heavyweight Championship
