= Raúl Mata =

Mexican professional wrestler (1947–2018)

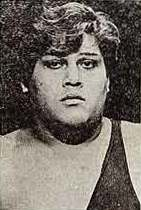
- Mata, c. 1973

Personal information
- Born: Raúl Mata; January 26, 1947 Guadalajara, Mexico
- Died: December 19, 2018 (aged 71)
- Spouse: Beverly A. Mata
- Children: 5

Professional wrestling career
- Ring name(s): Raúl Mata; El Rayo; Texan
- Billed height: 5 ft 10 in (178 cm)
- Billed weight: 224 lb (102 kg)
- Trained by: Cuhatemoc "Diablo" Velasco
- Debut: 1960s
- Retired: 1980s

Raúl Mata (January 26, 1947 – December 19, 2018) was a Mexican professional wrestler, who was mostly active from the 1960s to the 1980s.

Mata was the Mexican National Light Heavyweight Champion for a record 1,164 days. He often teamed with his brother Carlos Mata and together they held the NWA Americas Tag Team Championship promoted by NWA Hollywood Wrestling in the Southern California region. He also won the tag team title with Dory Dixon, Ray Mendoza, David Morgan, Victor Rivera and Chavo Guerrero (twice).

== Early life ==
Mata was born in Guadalajara, Mexico on January 26, 1947, the third of twelve children of Jose Mata Espinoza and Angelina Martinez Aguirre.

== Professional wrestling career ==
Mata trained as a professional wrestler under Cuhatemoc "Diablo" Velasco.

The exact year Mata began wrestling is uncertain, only that he was wrestling for Empresa Mexicana de Lucha Libre (EMLL) by the late-1960s. Mata's first major championship was the Mexican National Light Heavyweight Championship, a championship he won on April 11, 1968, when he defeated Dr. Wagner to win the vacant title. The championship reign lasted until June 18, 1972, where Mata lost the title to Enrique Vera.

In the early 1970s, Mata began working for the NWA Hollywood Wrestling promotion based in Los Angeles, California in the United States. In NWA Hollywood Wrestling he held the NWA Americas Tag Team Championship with a multitude of partners. In 1972 Mata held the title with both Dory Dixon and Ray Mendoza, both regular EMLL wrestlers as well. between December 21, 1973, and October 28, 1976, Mata held the NWA Americas Tag Team Championship a further five times, teaming with David Morgan, Víctor Rivera, Chavo Guerrero twice and finally with his brother Carlos Mata.

In 1977, Mata won the Mexican National Heavyweight Championship when he defeated El Halcón on December 18, 1977, to win the title. Mata held the title until July 1, 1978, where he lost the title to El Nazi.

In 1970, Mata won the NWA Americas Tag Team Championship again, this time teaming with Mando Guerrero to defeat Leroy Brown and Allen Coage for the titles, holding them for a month before losing the belts to the Twin Devils. Raul Mata also held the NWA World Light Heavyweight Championship for 11 months, winning it on January 20, 1980, from Alfonso Dantés, losing it back to Dantés on December 15, 1980.

== Personal life and death ==
Mata was married to Beverly A. Mata, who predeceased him. He had five children. He died on December 19, 2018 at the age of 71.

== Professional wrestling style and persona ==
Mata was nicknamed the "Hawk of Mexico". He wrestled in a "technical" style. His signature moves were the "Mata Rola" (a modified huracánrana) and the dropkick.

== Championships and accomplishments ==
- Empresa Mexicana de la Lucha Libre
  - Mexican National Heavyweight Championship (1 time)
  - Mexican National Light Heavyweight Championship (1 time)
  - NWA World Light Heavyweight Championship (1 time)
- NWA Hollywood Wrestling
  - NWA Americas Tag Team Championship (9 times) – with Dory Dixon (1 time), Ray Mendoza (1 time), Salavador Lothario (1 time), Raul Reyes (1 time), David Morgan (1 time), Victor Rivera (1 time), Chavo Guerrero (2 times), and Carlos Mata (1 time),
  - NWA "Beat the Champ" Television Championship (2 times)

== Luchas de Apuestas record ==
Winner (wager)	Loser (wager)	Location	Event	Date	Notes
El Nazi (hair)	Raul Mata (hair)	N/A	Live event	N/A	
Raúl Mata (hair)	Shibata (hair)	Mexico City	EMLL 37th Anniversary Show	September 1970	
