= SCW Southwest Junior Heavyweight Championship =

Professional wrestling championship

Details
- Promotion: Southwest Championship Wrestling
- Date established: April 1981
- Date retired: April 1985
Statistics
- First champion(s): Chavo Guerrero
- Final champion(s): Chicky Starr
- Most reigns: Eric Embry (3 reigns)

The SWCW Southwest Junior Heavyweight Championship was a secondary title in Southwest Championship Wrestling, challenged for by lighter weight wrestlers. It lasted from 1981 until 1985, when it was abandoned after SWCW was sold to Texas All-Star Wrestling.

== Title history ==
Silver areas in the history indicate periods of unknown lineage.

Wrestler:	Times:	Date:	Location:	Notes:
Chavo Guerrero	1	circa April 1981		Awarded title
Vacant				Title inactive
Eric Embry	1	July 25, 1983	San Antonio, TX	Defeats Mando Guerrero in tournament final
Relampago Leon	1	October 1, 1983	San Antonio, TX	
Adrian Street	1	January 5, 1984	Beaumont, TX	
Bobby Fulton	1	March 19, 1984	San Antonio, TX	
Eric Embry	2	May 27, 1984	Austin, TX	
Bobby Fulton	2	June 13, 1984	San Antonio, TX	
Eric Embry	3	July 1, 1984	San Antonio, TX	
Chicky Starr	1	August 24, 1984	San Antonio, TX	
Ron Sexton	1	February 1985	?	
Chicky Starr	2	March 30, 1985	Girard, OH	
Title retired		April 1985		SWCW is sold to Texas All-Star Wrestling
