= NWA "Beat the Champ" Television Championship =

The NWA "Beat the Champ" Television Championship was a secondary professional wrestling singles title defended in Johnny Doyle's NWA Los Angeles from 1951 to 1959. The title was defended in the same area during the 1960s under promoters Gene and Mike LeBell.

== Title history ==
An (n) indicates that a title changes occurred no later than the listed date.

Wrestler:	Times:	Date:	Days	Place:	Notes:
Joe Pazandak	1	June 28, 1951	295		First champion.
Sandor Szabo	1	April 18, 1952	249	Los Angeles, CA	
Zebra Kid	1	December 23, 1952	42	Los Angeles, CA	
Sandor Szabo	2	February 3, 1953	26/56	Los Angeles, CA	
Vacated		March 1953	-		When the television program of the promotion is cancelled and Szabo continues to be billed as the "Beat the Champ" title holder in other cities at least until April 2, 1959.
NWA International Television Championship
Sandor Szabo	3	November 30, 1953	21	Los Angeles, CA	Defeats Lord James Blears.
Mr. Moto	1	December 21, 1953	21	Hollywood, CA	
Wilbur Snyder	1	January 11, 1954	355/385	Los Angeles, CA	Defeated The Great Bolo for the title and still champion as of November 6, 1954.
Nick Bockwinkel	1	January 1955 (n)	25/55		
Sandor Szabo	4	February 25, 1955	213		Still champion as of March 18, 1955.
Hard Boiled Haggerty	1	September 26, 1955	35		Haggerty is still champion as of October 24, 1955.
Rocky Valentine	1	October 31, 1955	35		
Red Berry	1	December 5, 1955	8		
Rocky Valentine	2	December 13, 1955	6/12		
Nick Bockwinkel	2	December 1955	13/19		Sometime between December 19, 1955 and December 25, 1955.
Wilbur Snyder	2	January 7, 1956	1/22		
Rocky Brown	1	January 1956	22/1		
Oyama Okato	1	January 30, 1956	21		
Don Leo Jonathan	1	February 20, 1956	14	Hollywood, CA	
Oyama Okato	2	March 5, 1956	26		
Wilbur Snyder	3	March 31, 1956	9		
Don Leo Jonathan	2	April 9, 1956	14		
Rito Romero	1	April 23, 1956	150		Sometime after April 16, 1956.
Sandor Szabo	5	September 20, 1956	70/102		
Vacated		December 1956	9/41		Sometime after November 28, 1956.
Al Kashey	1	January 9, 1957	63	Los Angeles, CA	Defeats Lord James Blears for the title.
Sandor Szabo	6	March 13, 1957	19		
Leo Garibaldi	1	April 1, 1957	2		
Shag Thomas	1	April 3, 1957	59/87	Los Angeles, CA	Still champion as of June 22, 1957.
Bobo Brazil	1	June 1957 (n)	1/29		
Mr. Moto	2	June 1957 (n)	91/120		
Sandor Szabo	7	September 1957 (n)	253/282		
Lee Grable	1	June 10, 1958	21	Wilmington, CA	Title held up on June 26, 1958 against Sandor Szabo.
Sandor Szabo	8	July 1, 1958	204	Wilmington, CA	Won the rematch.
Mr. Moto	3	January 21, 1959	126	Los Angeles, CA	Defeats Reggie Siki for the title.
Black Zorro	1	May 27, 1959	3402 (max.)	Los Angeles, CA	
NWA Beat the Champ Television Championship (Hollywood)
George Cannon	1	September 18, 1968	168	Los Angeles, CA	Defeats the Medic in tournament final to become the first champion.
Chris Markoff	1	March 5, 1969	1/26	Los Angeles, CA	
Vacated		March 1969 (n)	10/35		When Markoff is suspended.
Black Gordman	1	April 10, 1969	195	Bakersfield, CA	Defeats Alfonso Dantes after the two become the last men remaining in a battle royal on April 2, 1969 in Los Angeles, California and may be a repeat of the match on previous day.
Pepper Martin	1	September 17, 1969	63	Los Angeles, CA	
Great Kojika	1	November 19, 1969	28	Los Angeles, CA	
Pepper Martin	2	December 17, 1969	49	Los Angeles, CA	
Don Carson	1	February 4, 1970	49	Los Angeles, CA	
Rocky Johnson	1	March 25, 1970	51	Los Angeles, CA	Held up after a match against Fred Blassie on April 15, 1970 in Los Angeles, CA.
Rocky Johnson	2	May 15, 1970	63	Los Angeles, CA?	Wins rematch.
Les Roberts	1	June 17, 1970	40	Los Angeles, CA	
Great Kojika	2	August 26, 1970	21	Los Angeles, CA	
Great Goliath	1	September 16, 1970	84	Los Angeles, CA	
Takachiho	1	December 9, 1970	9	Los Angeles, CA	
Great Goliath	2	December 18, 1970	14/42	Los Angeles, CA	
Vacated		January 1971 (n)	-		When Beat the Champ moves to Channel 13.
The Professional	1	January 30, 1971	14	Los Angeles, CA	Defeats Takachiho in tournament final.
Suni War Cloud	1	February 13, 1971	49		
Kinji Shibuya	1	April 3, 1971	63		
Earl Maynard	1	June 5, 1971	49		
John Tolos	1	July 24, 1971	52		
Black Gordman	2	September 14, 1971	?		
John Tolos	2	August 21, 1971	?		
Kinji Shibuya	2	November 27, 1971	49		
Dory Dixon	1	January 15, 1972	49		
Masa Saito	1	March 4, 1972	21	Los Angeles, CA	
Don Carson	2	March 25, 1972	33		
Kinji Shibuya	3	April 27, 1972	1/21	Los Angeles, CA	
Mr. Wrestling	1	1972 (n)	1/21		
Kinji Shibuya	4	May 19, 1972	22	Los Angeles, CA	
John Tolos	3	June 10, 1972	35		
Kinji Shibuya	5	July 15, 1972	28		
Eric Froelich	1	August 12, 1972	35		
Masa Saito	2	September 16, 1972	35		
Peter Maivia	1	October 21, 1972	72/83	Hollywood, CA	
Ripper Collins	1	1973 (n)	1/12		
Earl Maynard	2	January 13, 1973	1/293		
Tony Rocco	1	1973 (n)	1/293		
Raul Mata	1	November 3, 1973	21	Hollywood, CA	
Great Yamamoto	1	November 24, 1973	7	Hollywood, CA	
Duane Allen	1	December 1, 1973	35	Hollywood, CA	
John Tolos	4	January 5, 1974	56	Hollywood, CA	
Pantera Negra	1	March 2, 1974	14	Hollywood, CA	
Butcher Brannigan	1	March 16, 1974	77/106	Hollywood, CA	
John Burich	1	June 1974 (n)	6/35		
Mr. California	1	July 6, 1974	56		
Manny Soto	1	August 31, 1974	7	Hollywood, CA	
Man Mountain Mike	1	September 7, 1974	34	Hollywood, CA	
Victor Rivera	1	October 11, 1974	22	Los Angeles, CA	Immediately held up.
Man Mountain Mike	2	November 2, 1974	<1		Given belt back.
Dennis Stamp	1	November 2, 1974	241/271		
Greg Valentine	1	July 1975 (n)	1/30		
Dennis Stamp	2	July 1975 (n)	63/92		
Inferno #3	1	October 2, 1975 (n)	29		
Greg Valentine	2	October 1975 (n)			Defeats Reno Tuufuli.
Tom Jones	1				
Black Gordman	3				
Don Fargo	1				
Larry Zbyszko	1				
The Hangman	1				
Black Gordman	4				
Mando Guerrero	1	1978 (n)	668/1032		
Battleship Johnson	1	October 29, 1980	1/122	Los Angeles, CA	Defeats Butcher Brannigan in a tournament final; still champion as of November 23, 1980.
The Assassin	1		1/122		
Chris Adams	1	March 1981 (n)	31/61		
Peter Maivia	2	May 1, 1981	335/364	Los Angeles, CA	
Victor Rivera	2	April 1982 (n)	43/72		Still champion as of May 23, 1982.
Mr. Go	1	June 12, 1982 (n)	50/80		
Killer Kim	1	August 1982 (n)	59/89		
Billy Anderson	1	October 29, 1982	38		
Vacated		December 6, 1982	-		Title become inactive when the promotion closes.

== See also ==
- SMW Beat the Champ Television Championship, which operated under a similar system in the 1990s
