= Adrian Street =

Welsh professional wrestler (1940–2023)

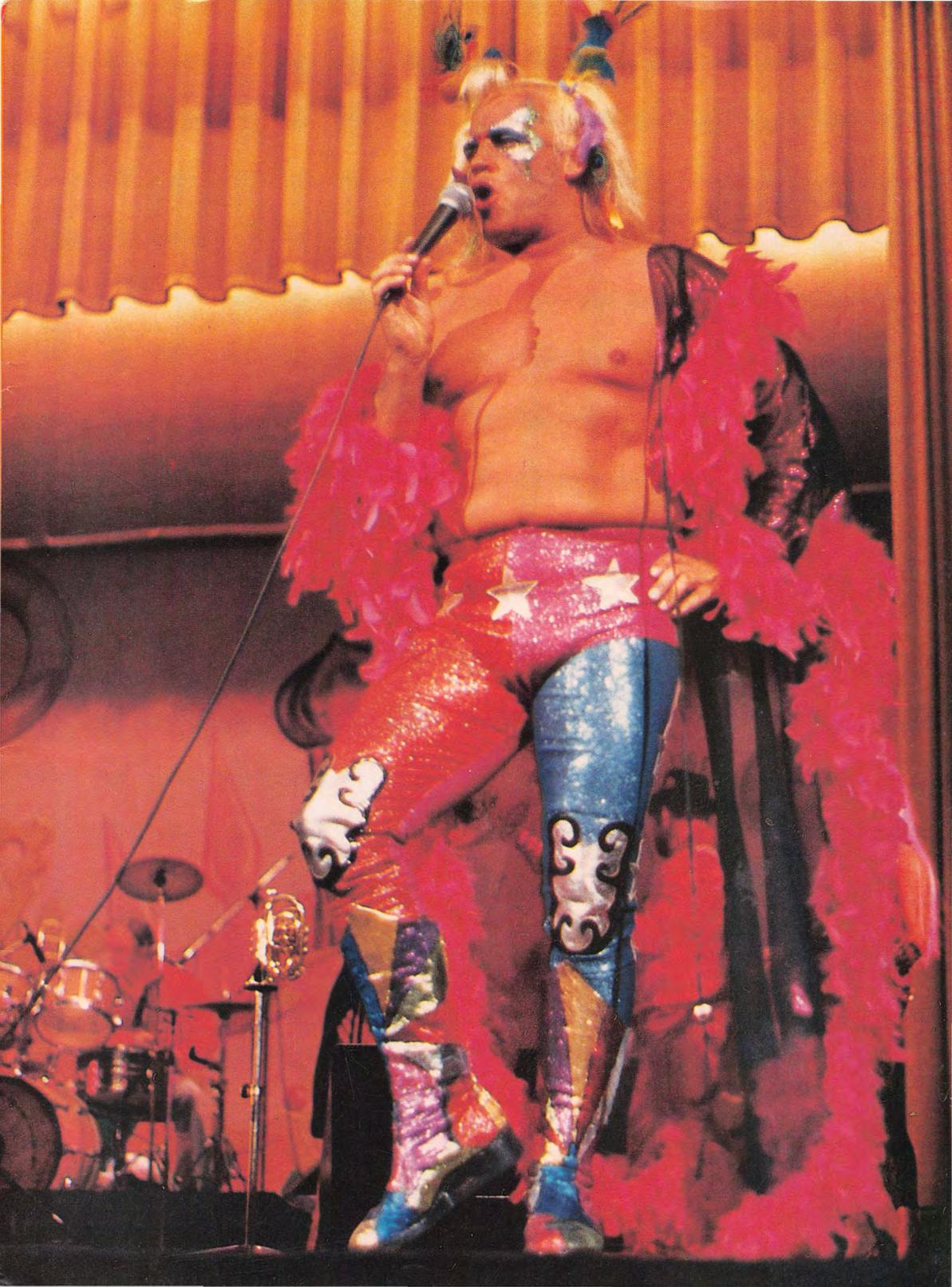
- Street, c. 1987

Personal information
- Born: 5 December 1940 Brynmawr, Wales
- Died: 24 July 2023 (aged 82) Cwmbran, Wales

Professional wrestling career
- Ring names: Adrian Street; Hell's Angel #1; Kid Tarzan Jonathan; The Nature Boy
- Billed height: 5 ft 7 in (170 cm)
- Billed weight: 235 lb (107 kg)
- Billed from: "The Royal Forest of Dean"
- Trained by: Chic Osmond; Mike Dimitre
- Debut: 8 August 1957
- Retired: 14 June 2014

Adrian Street (5 December 1940 – 24 July 2023) was a Welsh professional wrestler and author nicknamed "Exotic" who came to prominence in the 1970s and 1980s. During his career, Street was best known for his androgynous and flamboyant wrestling persona. Street was often accompanied to the ring by his long-time manager and wife Miss Linda, and the two worked primarily as heels.

== Early life ==
Street was born on 5 December 1940 in Brynmawr in South Wales. He came from a coal-mining family; his father was a miner for 51 years. Street began bodybuilding as a teenager, and in 1957 – at age 16 – he left home to begin his career in professional wrestling.

His early inspirations were American wrestlers Lou Thesz, Buddy Rogers, and Don Leo Jonathan, from whom he adopted his first moniker: Kid Tarzan Jonathan.

== Professional wrestling career ==
Street was trained as a professional wrestler by Chic Osmond and Mike Demitre. His first professional wrestling match took place on 8 August 1957. Using the name Kid Tarzan Jonathan, Street defeated Geoff Moran.

Later in his career, he developed his "Exotic" Adrian Street image, an outrageously-attired, effeminate character who was implied–but never explicitly stated–to be gay. Street has explained that this gimmick was born by accident as a result of him playing up to taunting from an audience one evening. In his words: "I was getting far more reaction than I'd ever got just playing this poof. My costumes started getting wilder". His wrestling attire evolved to include pastel colours and glitter makeup, and he clipped his bleached hair into mini-pigtails. As "The Exotic One", his signature move in the ring was to kiss opponents to escape being pinned down, and to put makeup on his opponents when they were disabled. He also sang several glam rock songs, such as "Sweet Transvestite with a Broken Nose" and "Imagine What I Could Do To You", the latter being his entrance music.

In 1971, he was booked in a match with the TV presenter Jimmy Savile. Due to disagreements with booking as well as disliking Savile due to his openly bragging about sleeping with underage girls, Street legitimately attacked Savile during the match and tore out Savile's hair. When the true nature of Savile’s sexual abuse towards underage girls became more apparent after his death, Street stated in an interview; “Had I known then what I know about him now, I’d have given him an even bigger hiding.”

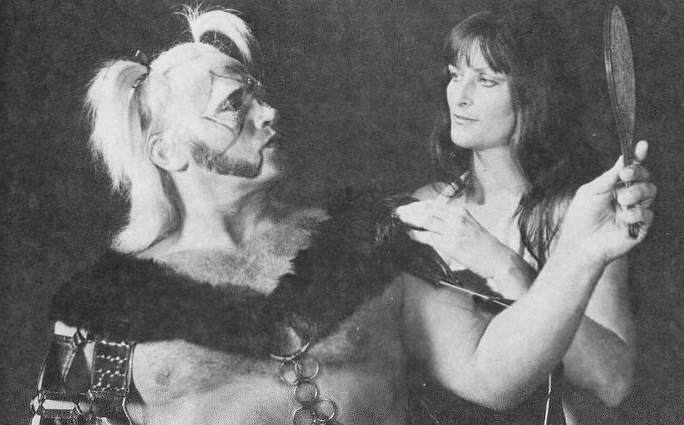
Street (left) and his valet Miss Linda (right)

Working primarily as a heel, Street travelled all over the world; locations where he wrestled included Germany, Canada, and Mexico. In the UK, he formed a tag partnership with fellow heel Bobby Barnes, naming themselves the Hells Angels.

In 1969, Street met his future manager/valet and real-life wife, Miss Linda (Linda Gunthorpe Hawker). During the 1970s, Linda wrestled in Britain as Blackfoot Sue. Later in America, the two formed a double-act, Miss Linda becoming one of professional wrestling's first female valets and frequently participating as an accomplice to Street's in-ring shenanigans.

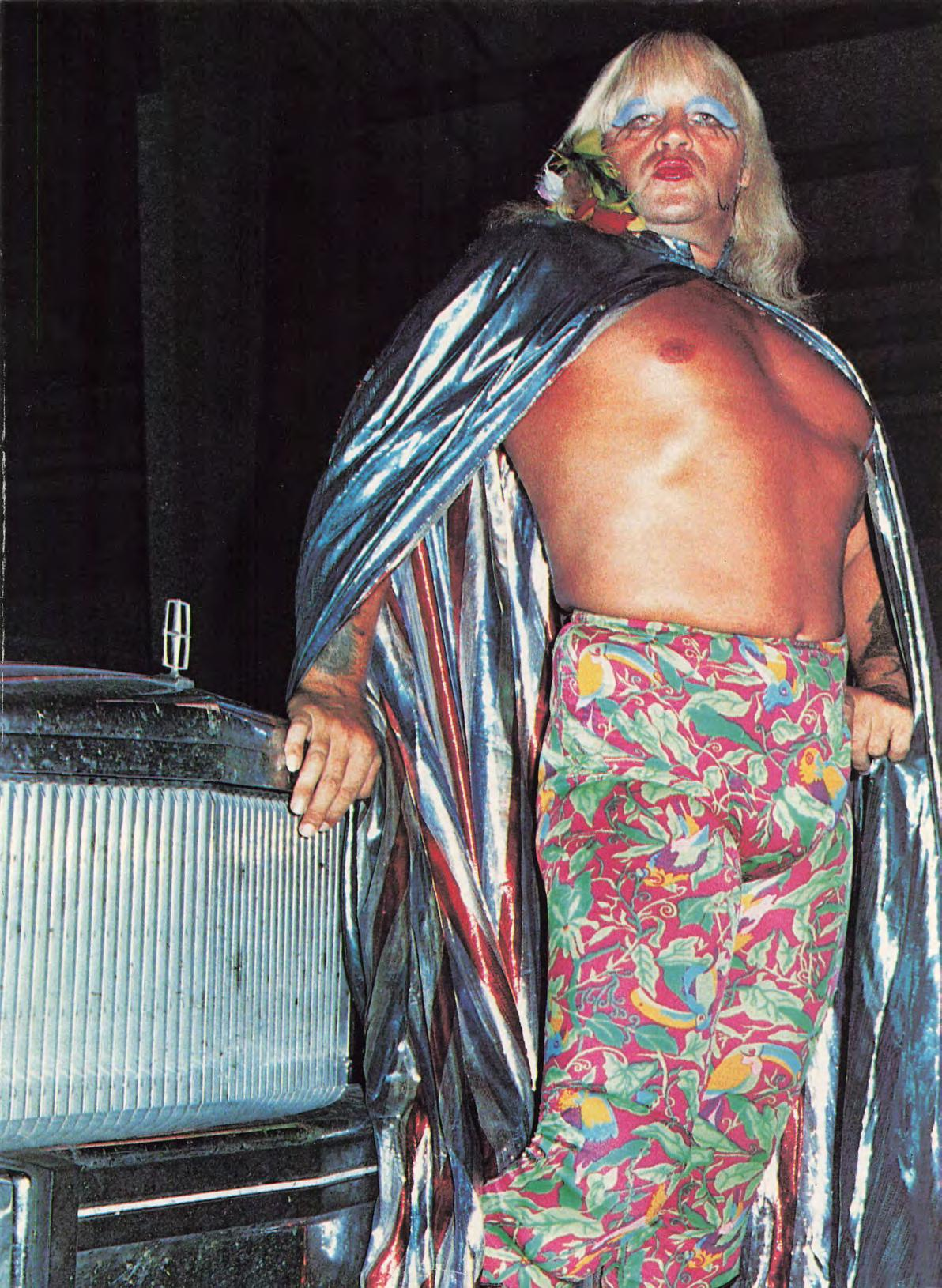
Street, c. 1986

Street and Linda made their North American debut in 1981. The two appeared in various areas in the territories in North America, and finally settled in Ron Fuller's Continental Championship Wrestling (CCW) in Birmingham, Alabama in 1985. Early on, Street worked as a heel against Austin Idol, Wendell Cooley, and Norvell Austin before turning face in 1986. Street was so convincing as a heel that fans stood in shock as Street saved Bob Armstrong, under a mask as the Bullet, from an attack by Robert Fuller, Jimmy Golden and Tom Prichard. Street had a long feud there with "The Hustler," Rip Rogers. He returned to the area shortly before it closed in summer, 1989, teaming with Bill Dundee and Todd Morton against "RPM" Mike Davis and a young Masahiro Chono, as well as a feud against Terry Garvin (Terry Sims) and his partner, Marc Guleen, known as Beauty and the Beast.

After retiring from full-time in-ring work, Street ran the Skull Krushers Wrestling School in Gulf Breeze, Florida, until being forced to close doors following severe damage from Hurricane Ivan. Street and Linda also went into business designing and selling professional wrestling gear and other sundries via their website. He created the ring gear worn by Mick Foley as Dude Love during his feud with Stone Cold Steve Austin.

Street estimated that he had wrestled between 12,000 and 15,000 matches during his career, which ended with a final match held in Birmingham, Alabama, in June 2014.

== Personal life ==
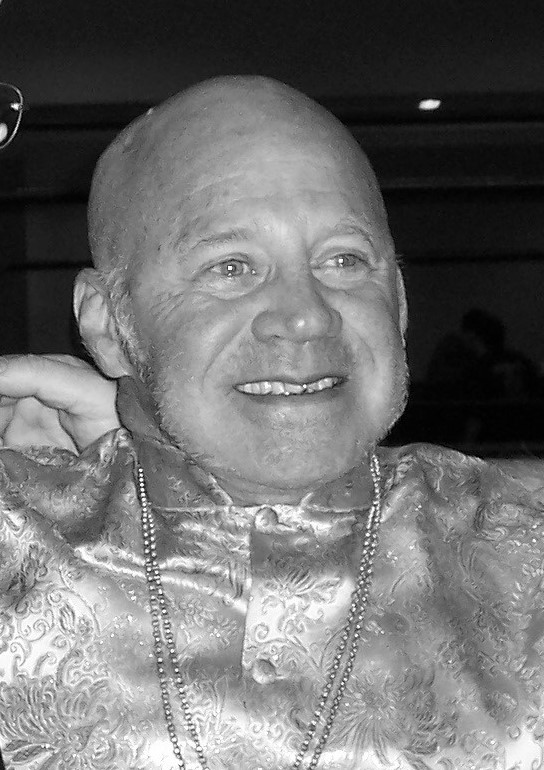
Street in 2005

In 2005, Street proposed to long-time manager Miss Linda at a reunion of the Cauliflower Alley Club. Don Leo Jonathan was his best man at the wedding.

Street survived a bout of cancer. In 2018, Street and wife Linda returned to Wales, citing the weather in Florida and the destruction of Street's wrestling academy by Hurricane Ivan. Street died at Grange University Hospital in Cwmbran, on 24 July 2023, at age 82. The cause of death was sepsis that had developed from a bout of colitis.

== Other media ==
Street appeared in the 1981 film Quest for Fire. He also appeared in Grunt: The Wrestling Movie (1985), as well as Pasolini's 1972 film The Canterbury Tales.

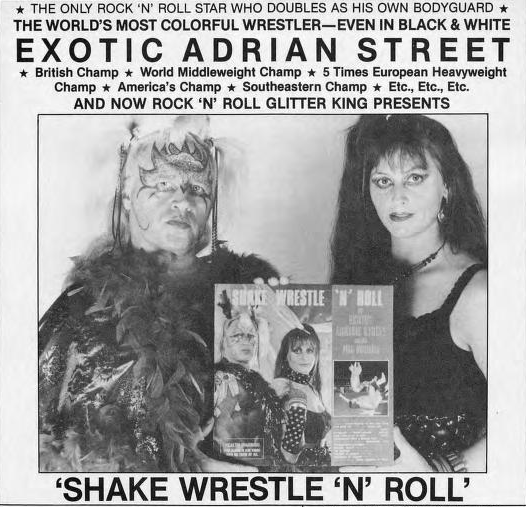
Ad for the album Shake, Wrestle 'N' Roll, circa 1987

Street and his band, The Pile Drivers, released the LP Shake, Wrestle and Roll in 1986. It compiled two earlier singles (from 1977 and 1980) with a selection of new songs.

A photo of Street in full regalia posing at the mine his father worked at features as the front cover of Black Box Recorder's debut album England Made Me.

Street is the subject of a documentary by visual artist Jeremy Deller, entitled The Life and Times of Adrian Street. A feature-length documentary of Street's life story by film producer and director Joann Randles was released in 2019 under the title You May Be Pretty, But I Am Beautiful: The Adrian Street Story.

Street's life story became an episode of the podcast Love and Radio in August 2018.

== Championships and accomplishments ==
- All Star Wrestling
  - World Middleweight Championship (2 times)
- Cauliflower Alley Club
  - Gulf Coast/GAC Honoree Award (2005)
- Championship Wrestling from Florida
  - NWA Florida Heavyweight Championship (1 time)
- NWA Hollywood Wrestling
  - NWA Americas Heavyweight Championship (1 time)
  - NWA Americas Tag Team Championship (2 times) – with Timothy Flowers
- Pro Wrestling Illustrated
  - Ranked No. 171 of the 500 best singles wrestlers in the PWI 500 in 1992
- Mid-South Wrestling Association
  - Mid-South Television Championship (1 time)
- Southeastern Championship Wrestling
  - NWA Southeastern Heavyweight Championship (Northern Division) (6 times)
- Southwest Championship Wrestling
  - SCW Southwest Junior Heavyweight Championship (1 time)
- Wrestling Observer Newsletter awards
  - Best Gimmick (1986)
