= Héctor Guerrero =

Mexican-American professional wrestler (born 1954)

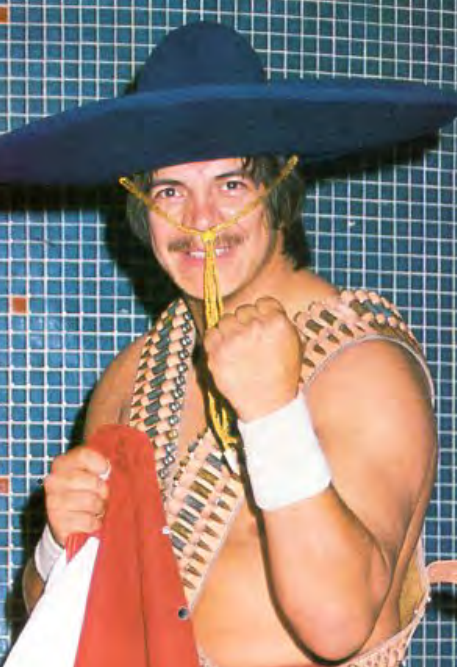
- Guerrero in 1984

Personal information
- Born: Héctor Manuel Guerrero Llanes; October 1, 1954 (age 71) Mexico City, Mexico
- Education: University of Texas at El Paso
- Family: Guerrero

Professional wrestling career
- Ring name(s): The Gobbledy Gooker; Héctor Guerrero; Lazer Tron
- Billed height: 5 ft 10 in (178 cm)
- Billed weight: 228 lb (103 kg)
- Billed from: El Paso, Texas
- Trained by: Gory Guerrero
- Debut: 1973
- Retired: 2010

Héctor Manuel Guerrero Llanes (born October 1, 1954) is a Mexican-American retired professional wrestler and commentator. He is a part of professional wrestling's Guerrero family along with his father Gory, brothers Chavo, Mando, and Eddie, nephew Chavo Jr., and niece Raquel Diaz. During his career, Guerrero worked for most of the major North American wrestling promotions.

== Professional wrestling career ==
Guerrero was born in Mexico City, Mexico, but his family relocated to El Paso, Texas in the United States when he was young. Guerrero attended the University of Texas at El Paso, graduating with a bachelor's degree in physical education.

=== Early career (1973–1980) ===
Guerrero trained as a wrestler under his father, Gory, and debuted in 1973 using the shortened name "Héctor Guerrero". Early in his career, he wrestled primarily in California, often teaming with his brothers Chavo Guerrero Sr. and Mando.

=== National Wrestling Alliance (1980s) ===
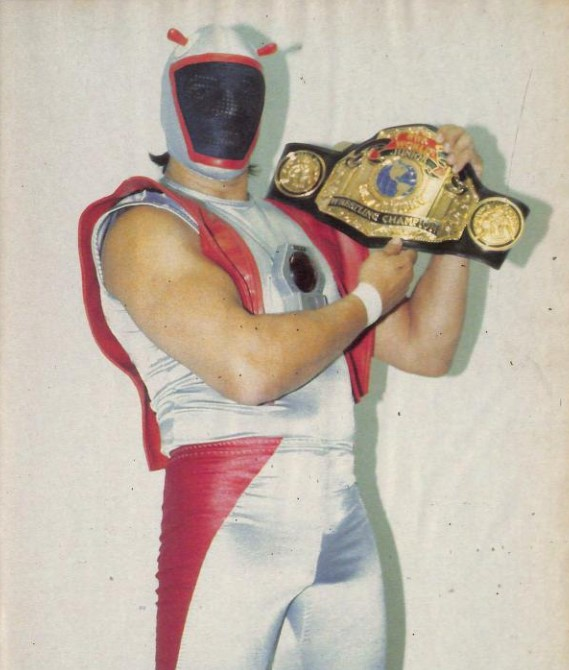
Guerrero as Laser-Tron with the NWA World Junior Heavyweight Championship, circa 1987

In the mid-1980s, Guerrero wrestled for NWA: Jim Crockett Promotions as the masked Lazer-Tron. Guerrero teamed with Jimmy Valiant and feuded with the New Breed. Guerrero went on to feud with Denny Brown for the NWA World Junior Heavyweight Championship, and teamed with Manny Fernandez as "The Latin Connection" until Fernandez turned on him to join Rick Rude and Paul Jones. In the late 1980s, Guerrero wrestled in the American Wrestling Association, winning the AWA World Tag Team Championship with Dr. D.

=== World Wrestling Federation (1990, 2001) ===
In 1990, Guerrero appeared in the World Wrestling Federation at the Survivor Series, performing under the name The Gobbledy Gooker and wearing a turkey costume. The Gobbledy Gooker "hatched" from an oversized egg, which had been on display at WWF events for months prior to the Survivor Series, and was heavily hyped on television. However, crowd reaction to the gimmick was extremely negative, with fans loudly booing as the costumed Guerrero danced in the ring with announcer "Mean" Gene Okerlund. Play-by-play broadcast announcers Gorilla Monsoon and "Rowdy" Roddy Piper tried their best to be enthusiastic. The character made a handful of appearances in taped promos following the Survivor Series, but was soon dropped from television. A few years later, WrestleCrap would use the name for its "Gooker Award", presented for the worst gimmicks, storylines, or events in wrestling.

After the character was shelved, the WWF did not mention it again for more than ten years. On the WWE Legends show, Pat Patterson said that it was Vince McMahon who came up with the idea of The Gobbledy Gooker. In the early 2000s, the WWF started mocking mistakes made in the past. The Gobbledy Gooker was revived for WrestleMania X-Seven to participate in the "Gimmick Battle Royal", an otherwise normal battle royal that was populated entirely by older, mostly retired wrestlers with outlandish gimmicks as well as oddball one-offs like the Gooker. Though the costume was very different from the original, and the on-screen graphic misspelled the character's name as "Gobbly Gooker" that night, Héctor Guerrero again wore the costume, being the second person eliminated in the match. When Okerlund was inducted into the WWE Hall of Fame in 2006, he recalled some of his famous interviews and he acknowledged that it was Héctor Guerrero in the costume, saying that "Héctor, we had a lot of fun, but all of this is forgotten".

=== Various promotions (1992–1995) ===
Guerrero appeared in Jim Cornette's Smoky Mountain Wrestling for a brief period of time in 1992 to 1993. Guerrero appeared with the Philadelphia, Pennsylvania-based Extreme Championship Wrestling promotion in 1995, unsuccessfully challenging 2 Cold Scorpio for the ECW Television Championship at Return of The Funker. Hector also wrestled for AWA, NWA, Mid South and Japan along with numerous other promotions over his 45 years in the ring.

=== World Championship Wrestling (1996–1997) ===
Guerrero appeared in World Championship Wrestling in 1997 to confront his brother Eddie about his onscreen behavior. He left the promotion after losing to his brother in a singles match on an episode of WCW Saturday Night. Eddie Guerrero stated in his autobiography that Héctor left WCW because he was unhappy with the way he was treated.

=== Total Nonstop Action Wrestling (2007–2015) ===
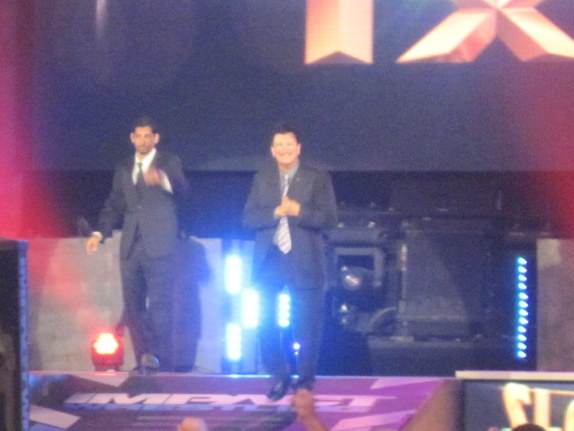
Guerrero with Willie Urbina, the Spanish broadcast team

On March 1, 2007, Total Nonstop Action Wrestling announced that Guerrero had been hired by TNA as a Spanish color commentator. On March 8, 2007, he was presented with an award for "achievements in the sport of professional wrestling" by TNA and the Hispanic Legacy Foundation. On May 1, 2008, Guerrero accepted an offer from The Latin American Xchange (LAX) to become their new (on-screen) advisor and mentor. On May 11, 2008, Guerrero managed LAX to three victories and the TNA World Tag Team Championship. He interfered in the second and third matches, first helping Homicide pin A.J. Styles, and then helping remove Johnny Devine from Team 3D's corner. On the Sep. 25 2008 edition of Impact! Guerrero, Homicide and Hernandez fought Beer Money, Inc. (Robert Roode, James Storm and Jacqueline) in a six-person "Loser's Manager Leaves Town" match. The match ended when Roode pinned Hernandez. As a result of the match Guerrero was no longer able to manage Homicide and Hernandez in TNA. After leaving LAX, Guerrero returned to color commentating. On the September 10, 2009 edition of TNA Impact!, Guerrero confronted Eric Young and the other members of The World Elite during an in-ring promo when Young tried persuading Hernandez to join their group. On April 28, 2015, Guerrero announced on Twitter that he officially left the company after 8 years. His profile has been moved to TNA's Alumni roster. Guerrero has since started his own Pro Wrestling Consulting Company.

== Personal life ==
Guerrero is the son of Salvador "Gory" Guerrero Quesada and a member of the Guerrero wrestling family. His uncle, Enrique Llanes, was a wrestler, as were his brothers, Chavo, Mando and Eddie, and his nephew, Chavo, Jr. He is Christian. Héctor is also married to his longtime sweetheart Penny. As of 2013, Guerrero was working as a physical education teacher in Hillsborough County, Florida.

== Championships and accomplishments ==
- American Wrestling Association
  - AWA World Tag Team Championship (1 time) – with Dr. D
- California Pro Wrestling
  - CPW California Championship (1 time)
- Championship Wrestling from Florida
  - NWA Florida Heavyweight Championship (1 time)
  - NWA Florida Junior Heavyweight Championship (1 time)
  - NWA United States Tag Team Championship (Florida version) (1 time) – with Chavo Guerrero
- Continental Wrestling Association
  - AWA Southern Tag Team Championship (1 time) – with Steve Regal
- Jim Crockett Promotions
  - NWA World Junior Heavyweight Championship (2 times)
- NWA Hollywood Wrestling
  - NWA Americas Heavyweight Championship (2 times)
  - NWA Americas Tag Team Championship (6 times) – with Chavo Guerrero Sr. (1), Black Gordman (1), Barry Orton (1), and Mando Guerrero (3)
- NWA Tri-State
  - NWA Tri-State Tag Team Championship (1 time) – with Ron Sexton
- Pro Wrestling Federation
  - PWF Tag Team Championship (1 time) – with Eddie Guerrero
- Pro Wrestling Illustrated
  - PWI ranked him # 423 of the best 500 singles wrestlers of the PWI Years in 2003.
- Western States Alliance
  - WSA Western States Tag Team Championship (1 time) – with Mando Guerrero
- World Organization of Wrestling
  - WOW Heavyweight Championship (1 time)
- Wrestling Observer Newsletter
  - Worst Gimmick (1990) as the Gobbledy Gooker
- World Wrestling Council
  - WWC Puerto Rico Heavyweight Championship (1 time)
