= Professor Tanaka =

American professional wrestler and actor

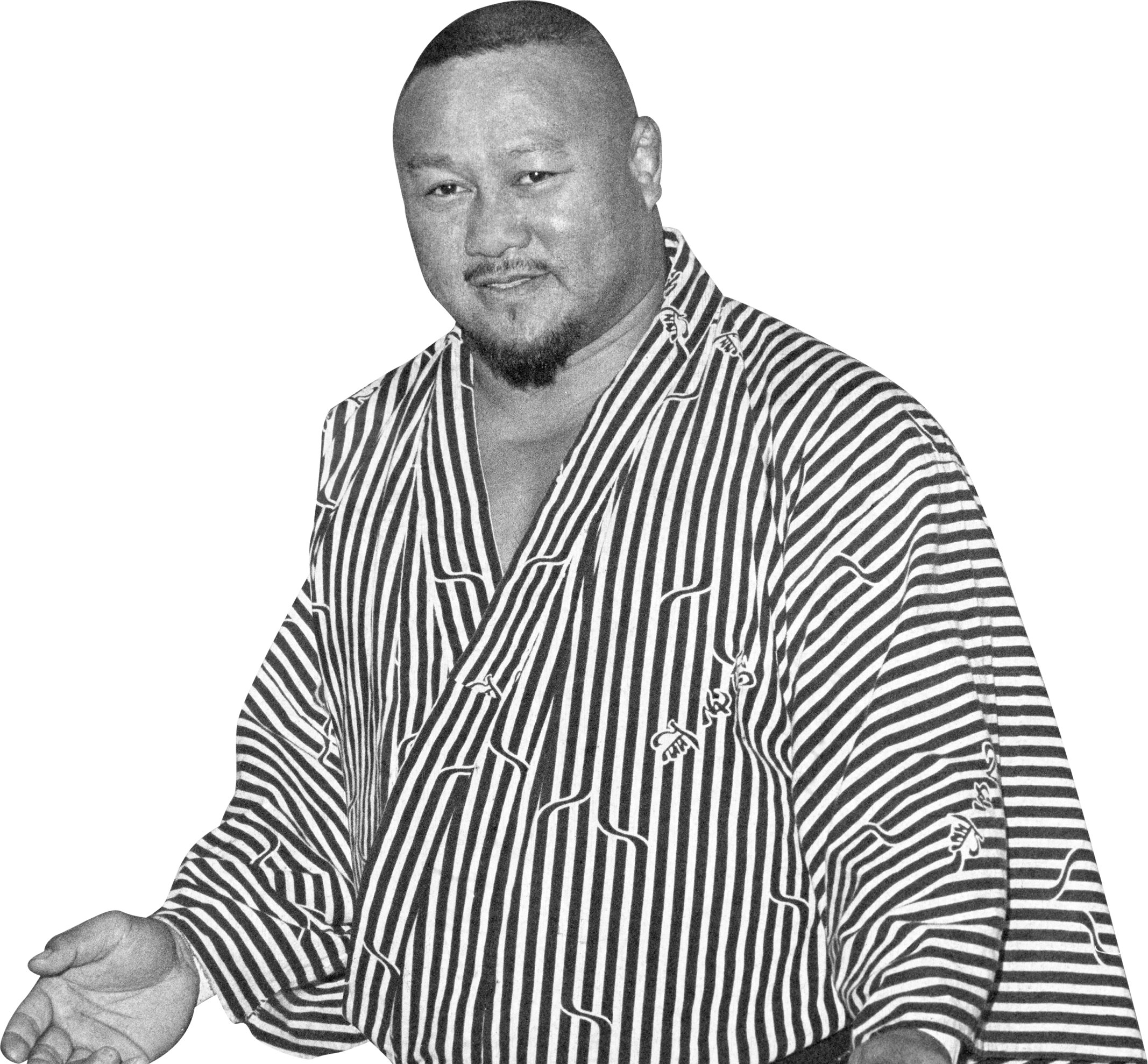
- Tanaka, c. 1973

Personal information
- Born: Charles J. Kalani Jr. January 6, 1930 Honolulu, Territory of Hawaii, U.S.
- Died: August 22, 2000 (aged 70) Lake Forest, California, U.S.
- Education: Weber State University; University of Utah

Professional wrestling career
- Ring name(s): Professor Tanaka; Professor Toru Tanaka
- Billed height: 5 ft 11 in (1.80 m)
- Billed weight: 280 lb (130 kg)
- Billed from: Hiroshima, Japan
- Debut: 1958
- Retired: 1986
- Military career
- Allegiance: United States
- Branch: United States Army
- Service years: 1955-1966
- Rank: Sergeant

Charles J. Kalani Jr. (January 6, 1930 – August 22, 2000), known by the ring names Professor Toru Tanaka or simply Professor Tanaka, was an American professional wrestler, professional boxer, martial artist and actor. He was best known for his work with the World Wide Wrestling Federation from 1967 to 1978, and was a 3-time Tag Team Championship (with partner Mr. Fuji) and one-time International Tag Team Champion (with Mitsu Arakawa). In 2019, he was posthumously inducted into the WWE Hall of Fame as a Legacy Member.

== Early life ==
Kalani was born in Honolulu, Territory of Hawaii, the son of Charles J. Kalani and Christina Leong Kalani. His father was Native Hawaiian, and his mother was of Chinese descent. Kalani began studying judo in 1939, and earned a black belt in Danzan-ryu Jujitsu from Seishiro Okazaki.

Kalani graduated from Iolani School in 1949. His wife, Doris Kalani, later credited Kalani's time on the football team and Kenneth A. Bray's influence with keeping him away from trouble. After graduating from high school, Kalani attended Weber Junior College (now Weber State University), where he met his wife in 1952. He also played college football at the University of Utah, as a guard.

In 1955, Kalani was drafted into the U.S. Army, where he rose to the rank of sergeant. Kalani left the military in 1966 and moved to Monterey, California. He ran a Judo and Danzan-ryu academy with John Chow-Hoon.

Kalani was also a heavyweight boxer. He advanced to the finals of the 1950 NCAA Junior College Boxing Championships, but was defeated by Ed Sanders. He fought professionally from March 1953 to February 1954, retiring with a record of 3–2–0, with one win by knockout.

== Professional wrestling career ==
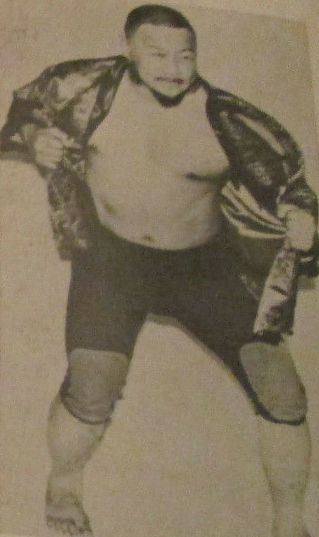
Professor Tanaka in 1972

Kalani got into professional wrestling in 1958, making his debut in his home state of Hawaii during his service with the military. In 1966 after retiring from the military, Kalani began wrestling full time. San Francisco promoter Roy Shire approached Kalani in 1967, launching his career in earnest. He also worked for World Championship Wrestling in Australia.

Kalani adopted the heel gimmick of Professor Toru Tanaka (or simply Professor Tanaka), a Japanese villain from Hiroshima (though Kalani was actually of Hawaiian and Chinese origin). One of the characteristics of his gimmick was that he threw ceremonial salt in his opponents' eyes after "blessing" each corner of the ring, a tactic that is most commonly associated with Japanese villain wrestlers. Tanaka did play the stereotypical Japanese villain with the requisite knowledge of martial arts. He employed a combination of power skills, martial arts, and his feared Japanese sleeper submission hold. Tanaka's most famous tag team partner was Harry Fujiwara (better known as Mr. Fuji), whom he knew from high school in Hawaii. In his book, Listen, You Pencil Neck Geeks, Freddie Blassie explored the relationship between the two "Japanese" heels.

From Tanaka's point of view, he was passing time with Fuji because it made sense to team up with another Japanese villain. The two certainly had no great admiration for one another. Tanaka was a by-the-book guy, who looked at wrestling as a means to make a living. He wanted to work his match, shake hands with everyone afterwards, and save some money. He was a professional.

If you wanted to talk about an angle beforehand, you always went to Tanaka. He was the ring general, who'd lead everyone else in the match. Fuji was certainly a good performer, but you couldn't control him. So, in addition to worrying about their opponents, Tanaka had the responsibility of making sure that Fuji didn't get out of hand. I guess he did a pretty good job because, years later, when Tanaka was relegated to working these tiny independent shows to earn a few extra bucks, Fuji himself had become a manager.

— Freddie Blassie, Listen, You Pencil Neck Geeks

Tanaka had a long successful run with the WWF in 1967, including being #1 contender to champion Bruno Sammartino. Sammartino was the one who requested Tanaka (who was working in Australia) to the WWF's owner at the time, Vince McMahon Sr. In their first Madison Square Garden meeting, Tanaka was disqualified for throwing salt. He was pinned by Sammartino in a rematch six months later. Tanaka also main evented the Garden in tag matches, twice with Gorilla Monsoon against Sammartino and Spyros Arion (Tanaka and Monsoon won the first via disqualification but lost the second in a Texas Death Match). A year later, he teamed with Monsoon against Sammartino and Victor Rivera. Monsoon & Tanaka had other Garden matches, including victories over Al Costello & Dr. Bill Miller; and Bobo Brazil and Earl Maynard.

Tanaka subsequently teamed with Mitsu Arakawa in the WWF in 1969, acquiring the International Tag Team Championship; losing it at Madison Square Garden to Tony Marino and Victor Rivera. He left the WWWF in 1970 and worked in Texas. In 1971, he returned to the WWWF. The team of Tanaka and Mr. Fuji won three WWF World Tag Team Championships, with Blassie as manager for the third reign and The Grand Wizard as manager for the first two. They first won the belts from Sonny King and Chief Jay Strongbow on June 27, 1972, in Philadelphia, Pennsylvania, at a House show. They lost the belts to Haystacks Calhoun and Tony Garea on May 30, 1973, again at a Hamburg house show, but regained them on September 11, 1973, in Philadelphia, Pennsylvania, before losing them again to Tony Garea and Dean Ho on November 14, 1973, again in Hamburg. Their third win came on September 27, 1977, at a Philadelphia house show when they defeated Tony Garea and Larry Zbyszko in a tournament final for the vacant belts, holding them until March 14, 1978, when they lost the titles to Dino Bravo and Dominic DeNucci in Philadelphia. This third reign set a record for number of championship reigns which would not be bettered until The New Age Outlaws won a fourth reign in 1999.

After WWWF, Tanaka returned to Japan, Hawaii and other territories until retiring in 1986.

== Other media ==
While wrestling with the World Wrestling Council, Professor Tanaka was also featured in a television commercial for the Sello Rojo brand of rice in Puerto Rico. His other appearance in a commercial was for Colgate toothpaste with Pat Morita. Tanaka was seen as an extra in a few of David Lee Roth's music videos in the mid-1980s, as well as a product tester on NBC's "Fight Back! With David Horowitz". By the early 1980s, Kalani's body could not handle the beatings in the ring any longer, and he moved into the film world on a more permanent basis. His first film was the 1981 Chuck Norris vehicle An Eye for an Eye and his last film was 1995's Hard Justice (starring David Bradley and Charles Napier). He appeared opposite Arnold Schwarzenegger in The Running Man as "Sub-Zero", the red-armor clad "stalker" who is a sadistic hockey-samurai with a scythe that "slices his enemies limb from limb into quivering, bloody sushi".

Other notable roles include The Perfect Weapon, 3 Ninjas, Black Rain, Darkman, Pee-wee's Big Adventure, and Last Action Hero.

Tanaka was one of three semi-retired professional wrestlers to compete in a tug-of-war match with two other wrestlers teamed up against a large group of children on the Nickelodeon series Wild and Crazy Kids in the early 1990s.

== Death ==
Kalani died of heart failure on August 22, 2000. His ashes were spread in the ocean near Haleʻiwa, Hawaii. He is survived by his wife Doris Kalani and his three children: Cheryle Kalani, Carl Kalani and Karen Kalani Beck.

== Filmography ==
- 1981 An Eye for an Eye as "The Professor"
- 1981-1982 Fantasy Island (season 5/episode 20) as Magog
- 1982 Cassie & Co. - Gorky's Army as Kiro
- 1982 Little House on the Prairie (A new beginning; "Alden's Dilemma" Season 9 aired first on December 6, 1982) as Japanese Sumo (uncredited)
- 1982 Slapstick of Another Kind
- 1983 Angel Of H.E.A.T.
- 1983 Off the Wall as Banzai Wrestler #1
- 1983 Revenge of the Ninja as Sumo Servant
- 1983 Tales of the Gold Monkey (season 1/episode 17) as Sumo Wrestler #1
- 1984 Airwolf (TV Series) as Bandit Leader
- 1984 The A-Team (TV Series) as Ling, The Bodyguard
- 1984 Chattanooga Choo Choo as Hashimoto
- 1985 Missing in Action 2: The Beginning as Lao
- 1985 Pee-wee's Big Adventure as The Butler
- 1985 Volunteers as Sumo Guard
- 1986 The A-Team - The Spy Who Mugged Me as Fröbe
- 1986 Bad Guys as Lord Percy's Bodyguard
- 1986 Shanghai Surprise as Yamagani San
- 1987 Catch The Heat as Dozu
- 1987 Matlock - The Annihilator
- 1987 The Running Man as "Professor Subzero"
- 1988 Dead Heat as "The Butcher"
- 1989 Tax Season
- 1989 Hyper Space as The Android
- 1989 Black Rain as Sugai's Bodyguard
- 1990 Darkman as Chinese Warrior #2
- 1990 Martial Law as Jimmy Kong
- 1991 The Perfect Weapon as Tanaka
- 1991 Alligator II: The Mutation as Joe "Tokyo Joe", The Wrestler
- 1991 Deadly Game as Ikiru-Sun
- 1992 3 Ninjas as Rushmore
- 1993 Last Action Hero as Tough Asian Man
- 1995 Hard Justice as "Cookie" (uncredited)

== Wrestling championships and accomplishments ==
- 50th State Big Time Wrestling
  - NWA North American Heavyweight Championship (Hawaii version) (1 time)
- All-California Championship Wrestling
  - ACCW Tag Team Championship (2 times) - with Peter Maivia Jr.
- California Pro Wrestling
  - CPW Heavyweight Championship (1 time)
  - CPW Brass Knuckles Championship (1 time)
- Championship Wrestling from Florida
  - NWA Florida Tag Team Championship (1 time) - with Dick Slater
- Continental Wrestling Association
  - AWA Southern Tag Team Championship (1 time) - with Mr. Fuji
- Georgia Championship Wrestling
  - NWA Georgia Heavyweight Championship (1 time)
  - NWA Macon Heavyweight Championship (1 time)
  - NWA Georgia Tag Team Championship (2 times) - with Assassin #2 (1) and Mr. Fuji (1)
- L&G Promotions

- L&G Caribbean Heavyweight Championship (1 time)

- National Wrestling Alliance
  - NWA Southeastern Heavyweight Championship (Northern Division) (2 times)^{1}
- Northeast Championship Wrestling (Tom Janette)
  - NCW Heavyweight Championship (1 time)
- NWA Big Time Wrestling
  - NWA American Heavyweight Championship (2 times)
  - NWA American Tag Team Championship (1 time) - with Thunderbolt Patterson
  - NWA Brass Knuckles Championship (Texas version) (4 times)
- NWA Hollywood Wrestling
  - NWA Americas Heavyweight Championship (1 time)
  - NWA Americas Tag Team Championship (1 time) - with Dr. Hiro Ota
- NWA New Zealand
  - NWA British Empire/Commonwealth Championship (2 times)
- Southeastern Championship Wrestling
  - NWA Southeastern Tag Team Championship (1 time) - with Mr. Fuji
- World Championship Wrestling (Australia)
  - IWA World Heavyweight Championship (2 times)
  - IWA World Tag Team Championship (1 time) - with Skull Murphy
- World Wide Wrestling Federation/WWE
  - WWWF International Tag Team Championship (1 time, inaugural) - with Mitsu Arakawa
  - WWWF World Tag Team Championship (3 times) - with Mr. Fuji
  - WWE Hall of Fame (Class of 2019)

^{1}Records do not show which NWA affiliate Tanaka worked for when his two reigns with the title began. While usually defended in Southeastern Championship Wrestling, it was occasionally used in other promotions.
