= Rocky Johnson =

Canadian professional wrestler (1944–2020)

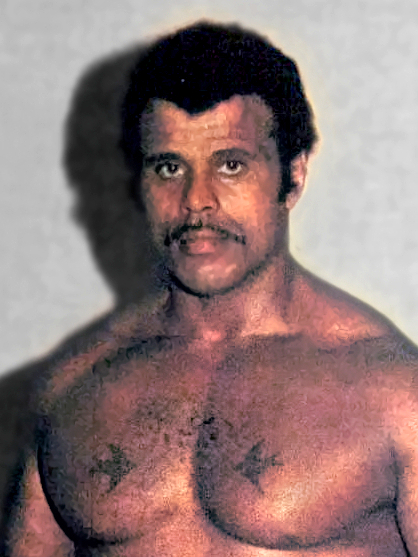
- Johnson in 1983

Personal information
- Born: Wayde Douglas Bowles; August 24, 1944 Amherst, Nova Scotia, Canada
- Died: January 15, 2020 (aged 75) Lutz, Florida, U.S.
- Spouses: Una Sparks (m. 1966; div. 1978); Ata Maivia (m. 1978; div. 2003); Sheila Northern (m. 2004)
- Children: 8, including Dwayne
- Family: Anoaʻi (by marriage)

Professional wrestling career
- Ring name(s): The Rock; Sweet Ebony Diamond; Drew Glasteau; Rocky Johnson "Soul Man" Johnson
- Billed height: 6 ft 2 in (1.88 m)
- Billed weight: 243 lb (110 kg)
- Billed from: Toronto, Ontario, Canada; Washington, D.C.
- Trained by: Peter Maivia; Rocky Bollie; Kurt Von Steiger
- Debut: 1964
- Retired: March 27, 2004

Rocky Johnson (born Wayde Douglas Bowles; August 24, 1944 – January 15, 2020) was a Canadian professional wrestler. Among many National Wrestling Alliance titles, he was the first Black NWA Georgia Heavyweight Champion as well as the NWA Television Champion (2 times). He won the WWF Tag Team Championship in 1983, along with his partner Tony Atlas, to become the first black tag team champions in WWE history. He was the father of actor and wrestler Dwayne "The Rock" Johnson and the grandfather of wrestler Simone "Ava" Johnson.

== Early life ==
Wayde Douglas Bowles was born in Amherst, Nova Scotia, the fourth of five sons. His parents were James Henry Bowles (1888–1957) and Lillian (née Gay; 1919–1996). As a Black Nova Scotian, he was descended from Black Loyalists who immigrated to Nova Scotia after escaping from a plantation in the United States after the American War of Independence. Another ancestor, Dembo Sickles, was the son of a chief in present-day Benin who was captured by slavehunters in 1762 and brought to Prince Edward Island, where he eventually bought his freedom.

At the age of 16, Johnson moved to Toronto, where he began wrestling and worked as a truck driver. Initially, he trained to be a boxer and eventually sparred with greats such as Muhammad Ali and George Foreman, but was always fascinated by wrestling.

Rocky's brother Ricky was also a wrestler.

== Professional wrestling career ==
=== National Wrestling Alliance (1964–1982) ===
Johnson began his career as a professional wrestler in 1964 in Southern Ontario; soon after his debut, he legally changed his name to his moniker. He chose the name Rocky Johnson as a tribute to two of his favorite boxing greats: Rocky Marciano and Jack Johnson, the latter being the first black heavyweight boxing champion. In the late 1960s to mid 1970s, he was a major star in California. In Los Angeles he took on Freddie Blassie, The Destroyer and John Tolos.

He was a top contender in the National Wrestling Alliance in the 1970s, receiving title matches against then-World Champions Terry Funk and Harley Race. He was well-suited for tag team wrestling, winning several regional tag team championships in the NWA. Johnson wrestled off and on in the Memphis promotion, often feuding with Jerry Lawler, winning Lawler's crown at one point. He also wrestled under a mask as "Sweet Ebony Diamond" in the Mid-Atlantic area.

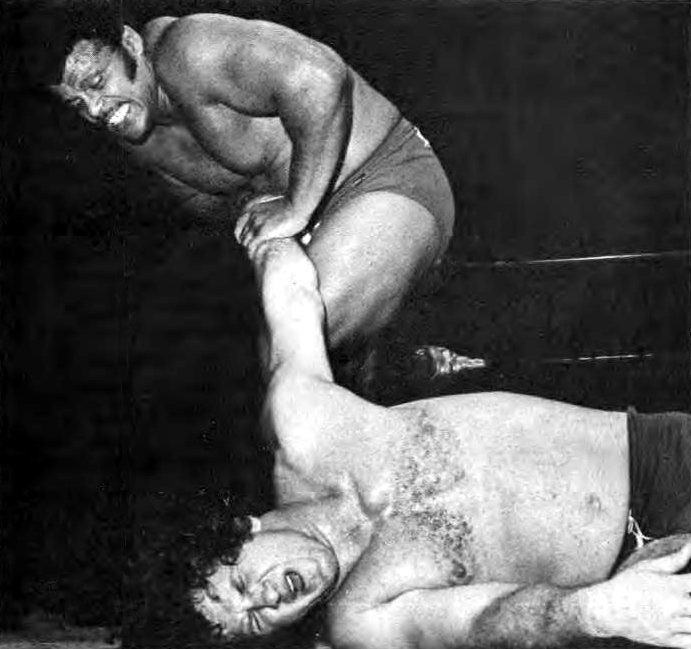
Johnson applies an armlock to Terry Funk.

=== World Wrestling Federation (1982–1985) ===
In 1982, Johnson feuded with Don Muraco, Greg Valentine, Mike Sharpe, Buddy Rose, and Adrian Adonis. He was then paired with Tony Atlas as a tag team. They defeated the Wild Samoans (Afa and Sika) for the Tag Team Championship on the December 10, 1983 episode of Championship Wrestling (taped November 15). They were the first black men to hold a WWF championship. Together, they were billed as "The Soul Patrol".

=== Later career (1985–1991) ===
After leaving WWF in June 1985, Johnson went to Central States, Tennessee, Hawaii, Portland, Puerto Rico and the independent circuit. In Hawaii, he teamed with his brother Ricky Johnson.

=== Retirement ===
After retiring in 1991, Johnson, along with Pat Patterson, trained his son Dwayne to wrestle. While he initially resisted his son's entry into what he knew to be an extremely difficult business, Johnson agreed to train him on the condition that he would not go easy on him. Johnson was instrumental in getting Dwayne (later dubbed "Rocky Maivia" after both Rocky Johnson's and Peter Maivia's ring names) signed to a WWF developmental deal. Initially, Johnson had an on-camera presence at his son's matches, and jumped into the ring on his behalf after he was attacked by The Sultan and The Iron Sheik at WrestleMania 13. Johnson was not seen on-camera again after the Rocky Maivia character flopped, and soon Dwayne achieved crossover popularity as a cocky heel, The Rock.

On June 14, 2001, Johnson came out of retirement teaming with Jimmy Valiant, defeating Buddy Landel and Billy Joe Travis at Clash Of The Legends in Memphis.

In early 2003, Johnson was hired as a trainer for the WWE developmental territory, Ohio Valley Wrestling, but was fired in May. He made a return to the ring, and defeated Mabel in a boxing match at Memphis Wrestling on November 29, 2003. His last match was on March 27, 2004, against Bill Dundee in a draw in Memphis.

On February 25, 2008, Johnson was announced as an inductee into the WWE Hall of Fame along with his father-in-law, "High Chief" Peter Maivia. Both Johnson and his father-in-law were inducted into the Hall of Fame on March 29, 2008, by his son, The Rock.

On December 20, 2019, Johnson joined the board of directors of the International Pro Wrestling Hall of Fame.

== Personal life ==
Johnson recounted in his autobiography Soulman that he met his first wife, Una Sparks, at a dance while he was training to become a boxer. Una was from Cherry Brook, Nova Scotia and a devout Jehovah's Witness. They had two children, Curtis and Wanda, whom he thanked at his 2008 WWE Hall of Fame induction. While married to Una, he became romantically involved with Ata Fitisemanu Maivia, daughter of wrestling legend "High Chief" Peter Maivia. Ata met Rocky after Maivia and Johnson were tag team partners in a match on the independent circuit.

Johnson stated that, in order to provide for his two families, he adopted a frugal lifestyle on the road; he subsisted on beer, sliced cheese, and bologna, and was not a "partier". He did not reveal if Una knew about Ata and Dwayne, but stated that she gave him an ultimatum to quit wrestling, or they would have to separate as Jehovah's Witnesses "didn't believe in blood sport". He stated that he and Una parted amicably and remained good friends. He obtained a divorce in Texas, then filed for a marriage license in Florida on December 21, 1978, to marry Ata. By marrying her, he became a member of the famous Samoan Anoaʻi family. Ata's father opposed their marriage because Johnson wasn't Samoan. Their son Dwayne was born May 2, 1972. They divorced in 2003.

In 2019, Johnson co-wrote an autobiography alongside Scott Teal, Soulman: The Rocky Johnson Story, released October 15 of that year. The book was recalled by the publisher shortly after release, due to payment disputes between Johnson and the co-author.

In 2022, Sports Illustrated published an article stating that Johnson had five other known children, in separate relationships, confirmed via genealogical DNA testing in the 2010s which connected them to Rocky's brother Ricky: Paula Parsons (b. 1964 in Lucasville, Nova Scotia), Trevor Edwards (b. 1967 in Montreal), Lisa Purves (b. 1968 in Vancouver), Adrian Bowles (b. 1970 to in Truro, Nova Scotia) and Aaron Fowler (b. 1970 in Amherst, Nova Scotia).

== Legal issues ==
In 1987, Johnson was arrested and charged for rape of a 19-year-old Tennessee woman. He claimed he was "set up" by rival wrestlers. The charges had him blacklisted from wrestling, leading him to alcoholism and a strained relationship with his son until several years later when he became sober.

In 2000, while working at the Pine Island Community Center in Davie, Florida, Johnson was investigated for several cases of misconduct, including unwanted groping of female coworkers. He later faced charges of battery and theft after he allegedly took home a piece of athletic equipment, as well as allegedly inappropriately grabbing a female coworker. The Broward State Attorney's Office, while noting there was "sufficient evidence" that Johnson had groped his coworker, declined to prosecute because the woman feared the publicity it would bring her.

== Death ==
On January 15, 2020, at the age of 75, Johnson died of a pulmonary embolism at the home his son bought for him in Lutz, Florida; the embolism was caused by a blood clot that traveled from a deep vein thrombosis in his leg. B. Brian Blair told the Associated Press that Johnson "thought he had the flu or something" but refused to see a doctor. Dwayne Johnson paid tribute, stating, "I'm in pain. You lived a very full, very hard, barrier breaking life and left it all in the ring. I love you dad and I'll always be your proud and grateful son." Hulk Hogan tweeted condolences, describing Rocky as "a great man, great friend" and "one of only a few that was kind and helpful when I first broke in".

== In popular culture ==
In his first television acting job, his son Dwayne, known at the time by his ring name The Rock, portrayed his father in a season 1 (1999) episode of That '70s Show titled "That Wrestling Show".

He is portrayed by Joseph Lee Anderson in the show Young Rock, based on his son's life. The series, which was green-lit for production by NBC four days before Johnson's death, dedicated the pilot episode in Johnson's memory.

== Championships and accomplishments ==
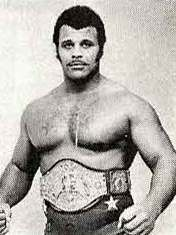
Johnson is a two-time NWA Texas Heavyweight Champion.

- Big Time Wrestling
  - NWA World Tag Team Championship (4 time) – with Ben Justice
- Championship Wrestling from Florida
  - NWA Brass Knuckles Championship (Florida version) (1 time)
  - NWA Florida Heavyweight Championship (6 times)
  - NWA Florida Tag Team Championship (1 time) – with Pedro Morales
  - NWA Florida Television Championship (1 time)
- Continental Wrestling Association
  - AWA Southern Tag Team Championship (2 times) – with Jimmy Valiant (1) and Soul Train Jones (1)
- Georgia Championship Wrestling
  - NWA Georgia Heavyweight Championship (2 times)
  - NWA Georgia Tag Team Championship (1 time) – with Jerry Brisco
  - NWA Macon Tag Team Championship (1 time) – with Danny Little Bear
- International Championship Wrestling Alliance
  - ICWA Tag Team Championship (1 time) – with Crash the Terminator
- International Professional Wrestling Hall of Fame
  - Class of 2025 – with Tony Atlas
- Memphis Wrestling Hall of Fame
  - Class of 2022
- Mid-Atlantic Championship Wrestling
  - NWA Television Championship (2 times)
- NWA All-Star Wrestling
  - NWA Canadian Tag Team Championship (Vancouver version) (1 time) – with Don Leo Jonathan
- NWA Big Time Wrestling
  - NWA Brass Knuckles Championship (Texas version) (1 time)
  - NWA Texas Heavyweight Championship (2 times)
  - NWA Texas Tag Team Championship (1 time) – with Jose Lothario
- NWA Hollywood Wrestling
  - NWA Americas Heavyweight Championship (1 time)
  - NWA Americas Tag Team Championship (1 time) – with Earl Maynard
  - NWA "Beat the Champ" Television Championship (2 times)
- NWA Mid-America / Continental Wrestling Association
  - CWA/AWA International Tag Team Championship (1 time) – with Bill Dundee
  - NWA Southern Heavyweight Championship (Memphis version) (1 time)
- NWA San Francisco
  - NWA United States Heavyweight Championship (San Francisco version) (1 time)
  - NWA World Tag Team Championship (San Francisco version) (4 times) – with Pat Patterson (3) and Pepper Gomez (1)
- NWA Polynesian Pro Wrestling
  - NWA Polynesian Pacific Tag Team Championship (2 times) – with Ricky Johnson
- Pacific Northwest Wrestling
  - NWA Pacific Northwest Heavyweight Championship (1 time)
  - NWA Pacific Northwest Tag Team Championship (2 times) – with Brett Sawyer (1) and Iceman Parsons (1)
- Pro Wrestling Illustrated
  - Ranked No. 258 of the top 500 singles wrestlers in the PWI 500 in 1992
  - Ranked No. 211 of the 500 best singles wrestlers during the "PWI Years" in 2003
- St. Louis Wrestling Hall of Fame
  - (Class of 2008)
- World Wrestling Federation / World Wrestling Entertainment
  - WWF Tag Team Championship (1 time) – with Tony Atlas
  - WWE Hall of Fame (Class of 2008)
