= Great Goliath =

Mexican wrestler (1934-2004)

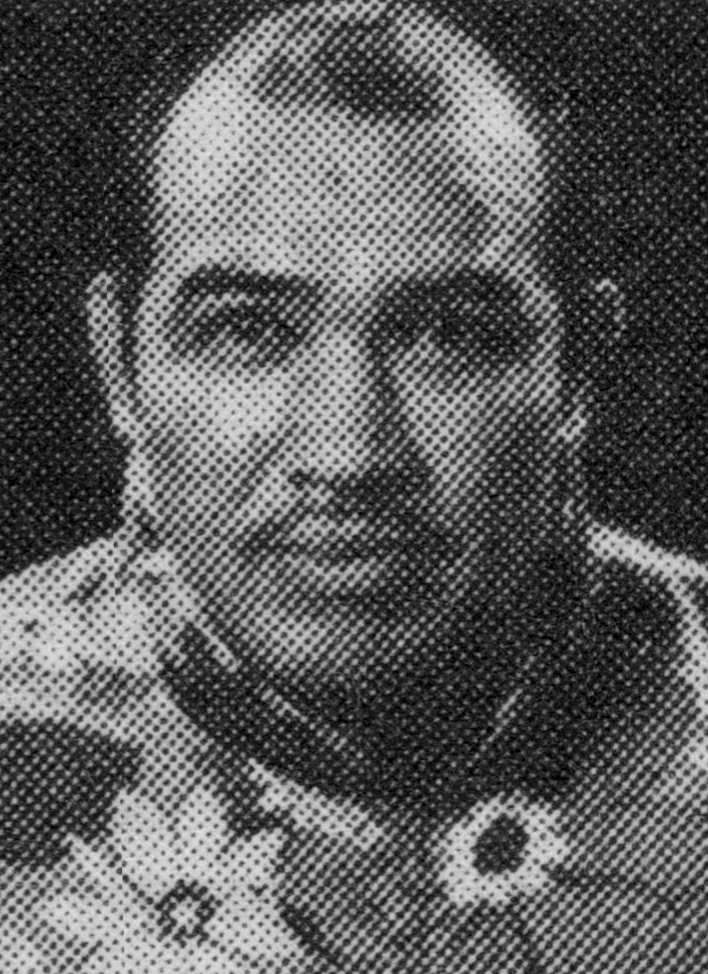

Personal information
- Born: Pablo Ordaz Crispín; June 18, 1934 Torreón, Chihuahua, Mexico
- Died: April 12, 2004 (aged 69) Las Vegas, Nevada, U.S.

Professional wrestling career
- Ring name(s): Asian Terror #2; El Goliath; El Gran Goliath; Great Goliath; Mighty Goliath; Pablo Crispín; Pablo Ordaz; Victor Gordman
- Billed height: 5 ft 10 in (178 cm)
- Billed weight: 233 lb (106 kg)
- Billed from: New Mexico
- Trained by: Carlos "Gorila" Ramos
- Debut: 1959
- Retired: 1990

Pablo Ordaz Crispín (June 18, 1934 – April 12, 2004) was a Mexican professional wrestler, best known by the ring name Great Goliath. He teamed up with Black Gordman as "the Red Devils" in Mexico and Japan and Los Angeles during most of his career.

== Early life ==
Crispín was born in Torreón on June 18, 1934. The youngest of 11 children - all but two of who died in infancy - he grew up in poverty, leaving school to work as a bricklayer and taxi driver. Crispín's brother-in-law introduced him to wrestler Carlos "Gorila" Ramos, who offered to train him as a wrestler.

== Professional wrestling career ==
Crispin made his professional wrestling debut in Mexico in 1959; he was paid a six-pack of Coca-Cola. In 1969, Goliath won his first title in the Mexican National Heavyweight defeating Henry Pilusso which he held for 305 days. In 1970, Goliath made his debut in Los Angeles where he teamed up with Black Gordman as a heel tag team. He and Gordman won the NWA Americas Tag Team Championship 20 times from 1970 to 1982. They also worked in Texas, Japan, World Wide Wrestling Federation, San Francisco, and Georgia.

In the early 1990s, Goliath started Goliath Productions, promoting matches at the San Bernardino Arena.

Goliath died on April 12, 2004, at 69 years old.

== Professional wrestling style and persona ==
Goliath was nicknamed "El Diablo Rojo" ("the Red Devil"). His signature moves were the camel clutch and the "Mexican Stretch".

== Championships and accomplishments ==
- Central States Wrestling
  - NWA World Tag Team Championship (Central States version) (1 time) - with Black Gordman
- Consejo Mundial de Lucha Libre
  - Mexican National Heavyweight Championship (1 time)
- Georgia Championship Wrestling
  - NWA Georgia Tag Team Championship (1 time) – with Black Gordman
- NWA Hollywood Wrestling
  - NWA Americas Tag Team Championship (21 times) – with Black Gordman (20) and Kinji Shibuya (1)
  - NWA "Beat the Champ" Television Championship (2 times)
- Southern California Pro-Wrestling Hall of Fame
  - Class of 2004
- World Class Championship Wrestling
  - NWA Texas Tag Team Championship (2 time) with Black Gordman (1 time) and Bill White (1 time)
