= Black Gordman =

Mexican professional wrestler (born 1936)

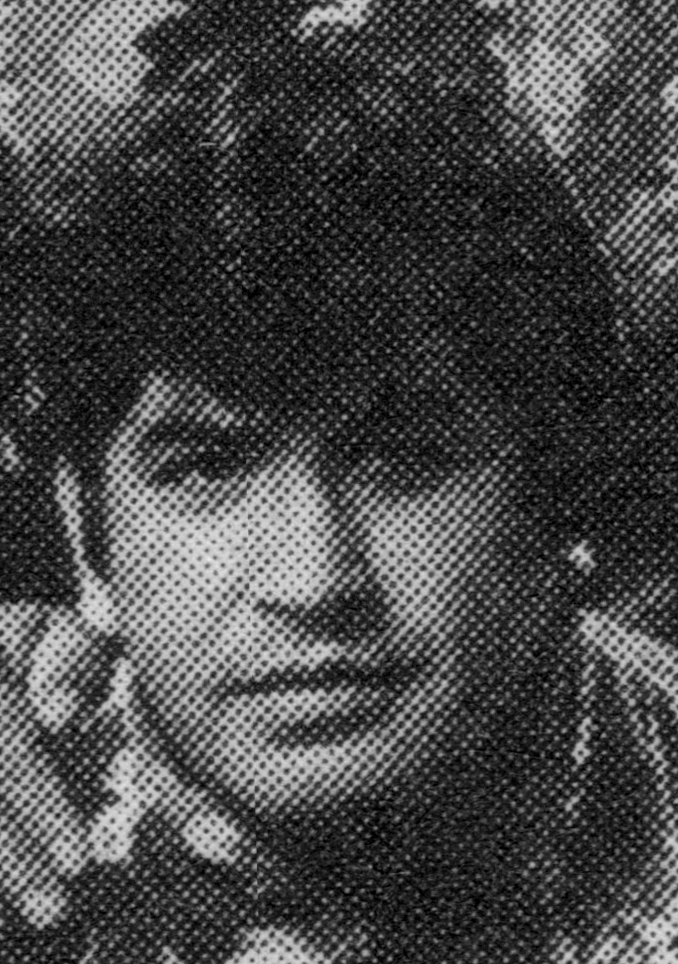

Personal information
- Born: Victor Manuel Barajas; October 5, 1936 Mexico City, Mexico

Professional wrestling career
- Ring name(s): Black Gordman; Victor Manuel; Black Demon
- Billed height: 5 ft 10 in (178 cm)
- Billed weight: 231 lb (105 kg)
- Debut: 1953
- Retired: 1986

Victor Manuel Barajas (born October 5, 1936) is a Mexican retired professional wrestler under the name Black Gordman. He teamed up with Great Goliath as "the Red Devils" in Mexico and Los Angeles during most of his career. Gordman won the NWA Americas Tag Team Championship 31 times with ten different partners. His finishing move was the DDT, later made famous by Jake "The Snake" Roberts.

== Professional wrestling career ==
Barajas made his professional wrestling debut in Mexico in 1953. In 1966, Gordman won his first title, the Mexican National Heavyweight Championship. In 1969, Gordman made his debut in Los Angeles.

In 1970, Gordman teamed up with the Great Goliath as a heel tag team. He and Goliath won the NWA Americas Tag Team Championship twenty times from 1970 to 1982. They also worked in Texas, Japan, the World Wide Wrestling Federation, San Francisco and Georgia.

Gordman on his own worked for Southwest Championship Wrestling in Houston, Houston Wrestling, World Class Championship Wrestling and Mid-South Wrestling in the early 1980s. In 1983, he worked for the World Wrestling Federation. From 1984 to 1985, Gordman went to Puerto Rico where he won the WWC Puerto Rico Championship defeating Konga the Barbarian. He dropped the title to his tag partner Super Medico 1. He retired from wrestling in 1986.

== Championships and accomplishments ==
- Central States Wrestling
  - NWA World Tag Team Championship (Central States version) (1 time) - with Goliath
- Consejo Mundial de Lucha Libre
  - Mexican National Heavyweight Championship (1 time)
- Georgia Championship Wrestling
  - NWA Georgia Tag Team Championship (1 time) – with Great Goliath
- NWA Hollywood Wrestling
  - NWA Americas Heavyweight Championship (4 times)
  - NWA Americas Tag Team Championship (31 times) – with Great Goliath (20), Bull Ramos (3), Pepper Gomez (1), Chris Markoff (1), Rocky Montero (1), Keith Franks (1), Chavo Guerrero Sr. (1), Hector Guerrero (1), Ryuma Go (1) and Master Lee (1)
  - NWA Beat The Champ Television Championship (3 times)
- Pacific Northwest Wrestling
  - NWA Pacific Northwest Heavyweight Championship (2 times)
- Southern California Pro-Wrestling Hall of Fame
  - Class of 2005
- World Class Championship Wrestling
  - NWA Texas Tag Team Championship (1 time) with Great Goliath (1)
- World Wrestling Council
  - WWC Puerto Rico Championship (1 time)
  - WWC World Tag Team Championship (7 times) - with Super Medico #1
