= Chavo Guerrero Sr. =

American professional wrestler (1949–2017)

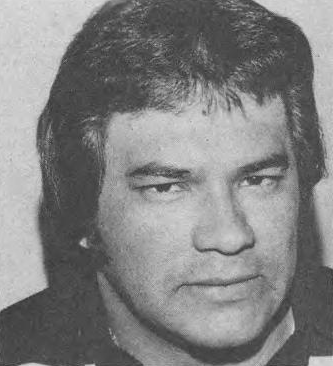
- Guerrero, circa 1978

Personal information
- Born: Salvador Guerrero Llanes; January 7, 1949 El Paso, Texas, U.S.
- Died: February 11, 2017 (aged 68) El Paso, Texas, U.S.
- Cause of death: Liver cancer
- Family: Guerrero

Professional wrestling career
- Ring name(s): Chavo Guerrero; Chavo Guerrero Sr. Chavo Classic; Gory Guerrero Jr.
- Billed height: 5 ft 11 in (1.80 m)
- Billed weight: 229 lb (104 kg)
- Trained by: Gory Guerrero
- Debut: 1970
- Retired: 2016

Salvador Guerrero Llanes (January 7, 1949 – February 11, 2017), better known as Chavo Guerrero or Chavo Guerrero Sr., and also known during the 21st century as "Chavo Classic", was a Mexican-American professional wrestler. He was best known for his work in Universal Wrestling Federation (UWF), American Wrestling Association (AWA), and World Wrestling Entertainment (WWE) and for being the father of third-generation wrestler Chavo Guerrero Jr. He was the oldest son of Salvador "Gory" Guerrero, and part of the Guerrero wrestling family. He was the oldest WWE Cruiserweight Champion.

== Professional wrestling career ==
=== Early career (1970–1981) ===
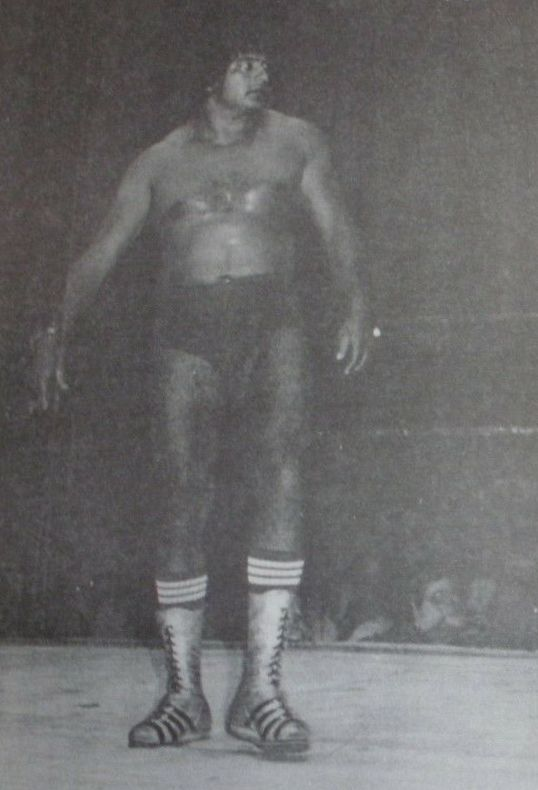
Guerrero in 1977

Guerrero was an accomplished amateur wrestler who transitioned to professional wrestling in 1970. Initially, he used the name "Gory Guerrero Jr.", but soon adopted the name "Chavo Guerrero". Guerrero initially competed for NWA Western States and later moved his family to California so he could compete in Los Angeles's NWA Hollywood Wrestling and San Francisco's Big Time Wrestling. He had his breakout in 1975 when he won the Jules Strongbow Scientific Wrestler Trophy, the NWA Americas Heavyweight Championship and the NWA Americas Tag Team Championship. In 1977, he beat Alfonso Dantes to win the NWA World Junior Heavyweight Championship, a title he would hold two times before ultimately losing it back to Dantes. In NWA Hollywood, he feuded with Roddy Piper, Ernie Ladd and Dory Funk Jr. for the NWA Americas Heavyweight Championship. Between 1975 and 1980, he held the title a total of seventeen times.

=== Various territories (1981–1988) ===
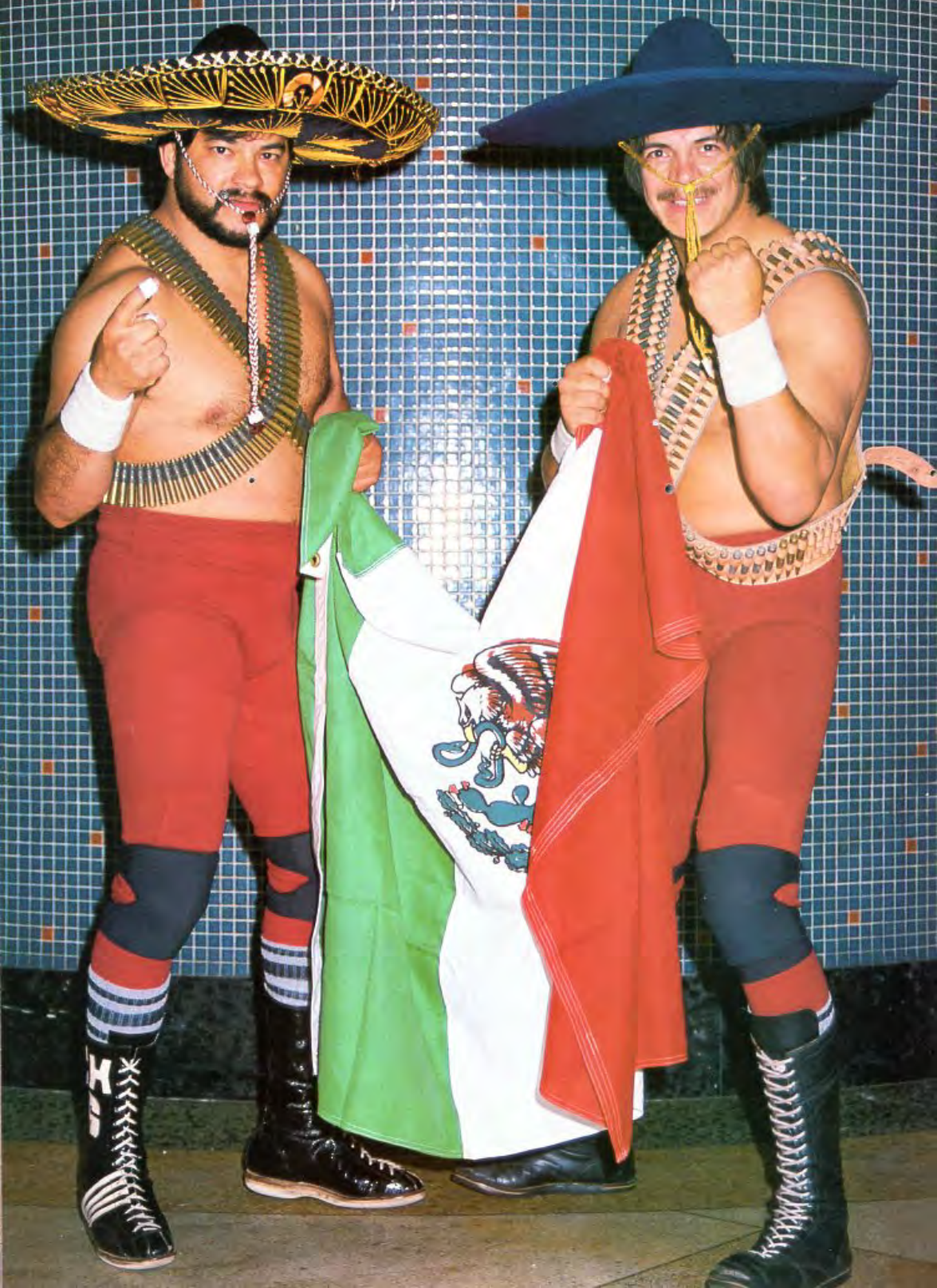
Chavo (left) and Hector (right) Guerrero, circa 1984

He spent the early 80's splitting his time between All Japan Pro Wrestling, Mid South Wrestling, CWF, and Houston Wrestling. In 1982, Guerrero feuded with Atsushi Onita over the NWA International Junior Heavyweight Championship in All Japan Pro Wrestling. In 1983, he feuded with Gino Hernandez in Mid South Wrestling. The feud resulted in Loser Leaves Town matches, Texas Death Matches and a Mexican Chicken Match. In 1984, he teamed with his brother Hector Guerrero in Championship Wrestling from Florida. They had rivalries with The U.S. Express, from whom they captured the NWA United States Tag Team Titles from and The Breakdancers of Brickhouse Brown and Mark Ragin. In 1985, Hector and Chavo then traveled back over to Mid South Wrestling, where they feuded with The Rock 'n' Roll Express. They then engaged in a rivalry with Ted DiBiase and "Dr. Death" Steve Williams over the UWF Tag Team Championship. In 1986, they wrestled The Fabulous Ones on multiple occasions for Mid South.

=== AWA and EMLL (1988–1990s) ===
In 1988, Mando and Chavo stopped in the AWA. They went after the AWA World Tag Team Championship held by Diamond Dallas Page's team of Badd Company (Paul Diamond and Pat Tanaka). However, they were unable to capture the titles in multiple attempts. In 1990, Chavo teamed with his brothers Mando and Eddie in EMLL. He competed with his brothers in multiple trios matches.

=== World Wrestling Entertainment (2004, 2010) ===
In 2004, Guerrero began working for World Wrestling Entertainment (WWE), joining his son Chavo Jr. in a feud with his younger brother Eddie. While with WWE, he competed as 'Chavo Classic’. On the May 20, 2004 episode of SmackDown!, Chavo Classic became the oldest WWE Cruiserweight Champion in history, defeating Chavo Jr. and Spike Dudley in a triple-threat match. On the April 1 episode of SmackDown!, Classic and Chavo Jr. lost to Spike Dudley and Rey Mysterio. On the April 22 episode of SmackDown!, Classic and Chavo Jr defeated John Cena in a 2-on-1 handicap match. On the May 13 episode of SmackDown!, Chavo Classic defeated Jacqueline thanks to outside help by Chavo Jr. On the June 3 episode of SmackDown!, Chavo Classic retained the Cruiserweight title against Funaki, thanks to outside help from Chavo Jr. He lost the title to Rey Mysterio less than a month later. On June 15, 2004, he was fired by WWE for no-showing multiple SmackDown! house shows.

On the November 15, 2010, "Old School" episode of Raw, Guerrero returned as Chavo Classic, driving Alberto Del Rio to the arena.

=== Lucha Underground (2016) ===
Chavo Classic first appeared on Lucha Underground talking with Rey Mysterio about the upcoming match of the latter against his son Chavo Guerrero Jr. in a Loser Leaves Lucha match. During the match, Classic, who was in the attendance, turned on Mysterio, helping his son win the match, but Dario Cueto ordered to restart the match, and Mysterio hit the 619 on Classic and defeated Chavo Guerrero, leaving Lucha Underground without the Guerreros.

== Personal life ==
Chavo was the son of Gory Guerrero and the older brother of Mando, Hector, and Eddie Guerrero. He grew up in El Paso, Texas He had two children, wrestler Chavo Jr. and daughter Victoria, and he was the brother in-law of Vickie Guerrero.

In July 2016, Guerrero and his son were named as part of a class action lawsuit filed against WWE that alleged wrestlers incurred traumatic brain injuries during their tenure and the company concealed the risks of injury. The suit was litigated by attorney Konstantine Kyros, who has been involved in a number of other lawsuits against WWE. Over a year after his death, US District Judge Vanessa Lynne Bryant dismissed the lawsuit in September 2018.

== Death ==
On February 11, 2017, Guerrero died of liver cancer, at the age of 68.

== Other media ==
- In 1978, he co-starred with Henry Winkler in the movie The One and Only as a wrestler called Indian Joe.
- He is the subject of the song "The Legend of Chavo Guerrero" by The Mountain Goats and is featured in its music video.
- The 2017 Netflix series, GLOW has its 7th episode dedicated to Chavo Guerrero Sr.

== Championships and accomplishments ==
- All Japan Pro Wrestling
  - NWA International Junior Heavyweight Championship (1 time)
- National Wrestling Alliance
  - NWA World Junior Heavyweight Championship (2 times)
- Atlantic Coast Championship Wrestling
  - ACCW Heavyweight Championship (2 times)
- Championship Wrestling from Florida
  - NWA United States Tag Team Championship (Florida version) (1 time) – with Hector Guerrero
- Eastern Wrestling Federation
  - EWF Heavyweight Championship (2 times)
- Empire Wrestling Federation
  - EWF Heavyweight Championship (1 time)
- Hollywood Heavyweight Wrestling
  - HHW Heavyweight Championship (1 time)
- International Wrestling Federation
  - IWF Heavyweight Championship (1 time)
- NWA Hollywood Wrestling
  - NWA Americas Heavyweight Championship (17 times)
  - NWA Americas Tag Team Championship (11 times) – with Raul Mata (2), John Tolos (1), Gory Guerrero (1), Butcher Vachon (1), Victor Rivera (1), The Canadian (1), Hector Guerrero (1), El Halcon (1), Black Gordman (1) and Al Madril (1)
  - NWA World Light Heavyweight Championship (2 times)^{1}
- New Japan Pro-Wrestling
  - NWA International Junior Heavyweight Championship (2 times)
- Pro Wrestling Illustrated
  - PWI ranked him # 130 out of the 500 best singles wrestlers during the "PWI Years" in 2003.
- Southwest Championship Wrestling / Texas All-Star Wrestling
  - SCW Southwest Junior Heavyweight Championship (1 time)
  - SCW World Tag Team Championship (1 time) – with Manny Fernandez
  - TASW Heavyweight Championship (1 time)
  - TASW Texas Tag Team Championship (2 times) – with Al Madril (1) and himself (1)^{3}
  - Texas All-Star USA Heavyweight Championship (1 times)
- Vendetta Pro Wrestling
  - Vendetty Award—2014 Co-Special Guest star of the Year (w/ Chavo Guerrero Jr. & The Godfather)
- World Wrestling Association
  - WWA Trios Championship (1 time) – with Mando and Eddy Guerrero
- World Wrestling Entertainment/WWE
  - WWE Cruiserweight Championship (1 time)
- Wrestling Observer Newsletter
  - Best Wrestling Maneuver (1986) Moonsault block

^{1}When Chavo Guerrero won this championship, it was still officially recognized and sanctioned by the National Wrestling Alliance and was primarily defended in Consejo Mundial de Lucha Libre, an NWA affiliated promotion in Mexico. After the promotion's withdrawal from the National Wrestling Alliance, they kept the title and continue to use the NWA initials. However, the NWA no longer recognizes or sanctions it.
^{3}Defeats Al Madril to claim Madril's part of the championship, though he quickly surrenders the titles on the same day.
