= Earl Maynard =

Barbadian bodybuilder, professional wrestler and actor (born 1935)

Earl Maynard (born November 28, 1935) is a bodybuilder and professional wrestler as well as a film actor, producer and director from Barbados.

== Career ==
=== Bodybuilding ===
Maynard won the 1964 Universe - Pro - NABBA bodybuilding competition - part of the Universe Championships, the 1965 Universe - IFBB - now the World Amateur Bodybuilding Championships and the 1978 Masters Mr. America - AAU contest. He was also the winner of Mr. Europe 1959 and Mr. England 1960 early in his career.

=== Professional wrestling ===
Maynard started wrestling while he was in the Royal Air Force stationed on Cyprus. The sports facilities were very limited, so the implements for his weightlifting and conditioning had to be improvised with what materials he could find. While He was on Cyprus, a British wrestling promoter, who was there on vacation, spotted him and liked what he saw. Maynard became a professional wrestler in 1960. It was wrestling promoter Gus Karras who eventually brought Earl to the United States to continue his wrestling career there.

By the late, 1960s, he was working in Minnesota's American Wrestling Association (1967), Portland's Pacific Northwest Wrestling (1969), New York's WWWF (1967-69), Pittsburgh's Studio Wrestling (1968), Kansas City's Central States Wrestling (1967-69), and Canada's Stampede Wrestling (1969). He was National Wrestling Alliance (NWA)'s America's Tag Team Champion twice (with Rocky Johnson in 1970 as well as with his longtime partner Dory Dixon in 1972).

He went to wrestle in Mexico for EMLL Consejo Mundial de Lucha Libre in 1971, Japan for International Wrestling Association of Japan from 1971 to 1972 and New Japan Pro-Wrestling in 1973. He would finished his career in San Francisco until he retired in 1978.

All of his bodybuilding achievements were accomplished while he continued to wrestle professionally. He eventually became known in the wrestling circles as "Mr. Universe" because of being a two-time winner of that most prestigious of bodybuilding titles.

=== Acting ===
He made over 20 appearances as an actor in films. These include such films as Melinda (1972), Black Belt Jones (1974), Truck Turner (1974), Mandingo (1975), Swashbuckler (1976), The Deep (1977), Circle of Iron (1978), The Nude Bomb (1980), The Big Brawl (1980) and The Sword and the Sorcerer (1982).

== Personal life ==
At the age of 17, Earl was 5’ 10” tall and weighed only 130 pounds. Maynard left the island when he was 18 and moved to England where he completed his education. He earned a degree of M.S.F. in Physiotherapy in London.

After retiring, Maynard returned to Barbados. He began to direct his own films and work in real estate.

== Partial filmography ==
- Melinda (1972) - Karate Group
- Black Belt Jones (1974) - Junebug
- Truck Turner (1974) - Panama
- Uptown Saturday Night (1974) - Waldorf bartender (uncredited)
- Mandingo (1975) - Babouin
- Swashbuckler (1976) - Bath Attendant
- The Deep (1977) - Ronald
- Circle of Iron (1978) - Black Giant
- The Nude Bomb (1980) - Jamaican Delegate
- The Big Brawl (1980) - Buster Mountie
- The Sword and the Sorcerer (1982) - Morgan (final film role)

== Championships and accomplishments ==
- NWA Central States Wrestling
  - NWA Heart of America Heavyweight Championship(1 time)
  - NWA Missouri Tag Team Championship(1 time)- with Sonny Myers
- NWA All-Star Wrestling
  - NWA Canadian Tag Team Championship (Vancouver version) (1 time) - with Dean Higuchi
- NWA Hollywood Wrestling
  - NWA "Beat the Champ" Television Championship (2 times)
  - NWA Americas Tag Team Championship (3 times) – with Rocky Johnson (1), Frankie Laine (1) and Dory Dixon (1)

== Bodybuilding contest history ==
- 1958
  - Mr. Universe - NABBA, Tall, 1st
- 1959
  - Universe - IFBB, Most Muscular, 1st
  - Mr Universe - NABBA, Tall, 1st
- 1961
  - Universe - Pro - NABBA, Tall, 2nd
- 1963
  - Universe - Pro - NABBA, Tall, 3rd
- 1964
  - Universe - Pro - NABBA, Tall, 1st
  - Universe - Pro - NABBA, Overall Winner
- 1965
  - Mr. Olympia - IFBB, 3rd
  - Universe - IFBB, Tall, 1st
  - Universe - IFBB, Overall Winner
- 1977
  - Masters Mr America - AAU, Tall, 1st
  - World Cup Pro Universe - PBBA, Masters, 3rd
- 1978
  - Masters Mr America - AAU, Tall, 1st
  - Masters Mr America - AAU, Overall Winner

== See also ==
- List of male professional bodybuilders
- List of female professional bodybuilders
