= NWA Americas Heavyweight Championship =

National Wrestling Alliance championship

Details
- Promotion: NWA Hollywood Wrestling
- Date established: June, 1967
- Date retired: December 26, 1982

Other name
- WWA Americas Heavyweight Championship
Statistics
- First champion: Pampero Firpo
- Most reigns: Chavo Guerrero Sr. (17 reigns)
- Longest reign: Freddie Blassie (295 days)
- Shortest reign: The Monster (24 hours,1 day)
- Oldest champion: Bobo Brazil (56 years, 177 days)

The NWA Americas Heavyweight Championship was the top singles championship in the National Wrestling Alliance's Los Angeles territory, known officially as NWA Hollywood Wrestling, from 1968 until the promotion closed in 1982. The title was first established in 1967 as a secondary championship in NWA Hollywood's predecessor, Worldwide Wrestling Associates. Although the name of the title implies that it was defended throughout North, Central and South America, it was rarely defended outside of Southern California. As a result, the title was essentially a regional title rather than a national one. A number of NWA affiliated promoters at various points over the years have used their own regional versions or variations of "national" championships for the purpose of giving crowds the idea that the company was larger than it actually was, or that the company was the biggest or most successful within the ranks of the National Wrestling Alliance.

== Title history ==
Wrestler:	Times:	Date:	Location:	Notes:
WWA Americas Heavyweight Championship
Pampero Firpo	1	1967	Mexico	Defeats Coloso Colosetti in a fictitious match
Mike DiBiase	1	June 16, 1967	Los Angeles, CA	
Mark Lewin	1	July 28, 1967	Los Angeles, CA	
Fred Blassie	1	August 25, 1967	Los Angeles, CA	
Vacant		March 1968		Blassie is suspended by WWA.
Mil Mascaras	1	June 7, 1968	Los Angeles, CA	Defeats Buddy Austin in tournament final.
El Mongol	1	September 20, 1968	Los Angeles, CA	
Renamed NWA Americas Heavyweight Championship
Bobo Brazil	1	October 4, 1968	Los Angeles, CA	Has abandoned the WWA World Heavyweight title on October 1, 1968, when WWA rejoined the NWA.
Fred Blassie	2	January 10, 1969	Los Angeles, CA	
Bobo Brazil	2	February 7, 1969	Los Angeles, CA	
The Sheik	1	February 21, 1969	Los Angeles, CA	
Held up		March 21, 1969		Title held up after Blassie defeats The Sheik in a non-title match
Fred Blassie	3	April 11, 1969	Los Angeles, CA	Defeats The Sheik in rematch.
The Sheik	2	April 25, 1969	Los Angeles, CA	
Mil Mascaras	2	May 9, 1969	Los Angeles, CA	
Held up		May 23, 1969		Title held up after a match against Black Gordman in Los Angeles, CA
Mil Mascaras	3	June 6, 1969	Los Angeles, CA	Defeats Gordman in rematch.
The Great Kojika	1	December 19, 1969	Los Angeles, CA	
Rocky Johnson	1	January 16, 1970	Los Angeles, CA	
Fred Blassie	4	March 6, 1970	Los Angeles, CA	
Held up		March 20, 1970		Title held up after a match against Rocky Johnson in Los Angeles, CA
Rocky Johnson	2	May 15, 1970	Los Angeles, CA	Defeats Blassie in rematch
Fred Blassie	5	June 12, 1970	Los Angeles, CA	
Kinji Shibuya	1	March 26, 1971	Los Angeles, CA	
Fred Blassie	6	April 23, 1971	Los Angeles, CA	
John Tolos	1	May 7, 1971	Los Angeles, CA	
Don Carson	1	July 16, 1971	Los Angeles, CA	
John Tolos	2	July 30, 1971	Los Angeles, CA	
Mil Mascaras	4	September 24, 1971	Los Angeles, CA	Held up after a match against John Tolos.
Mil Mascaras	5	1971	Los Angeles, CA	Wins rematch.
Black Gordman	1	November 5, 1971	Los Angeles, CA	
Frankie Laine	1	December 8, 1971	Los Angeles, CA	
Killer Kowalski	1	January 31, 1972	Tampa, FL	Fictitious title change
John Tolos	3	March 10, 1972	Los Angeles, CA	
Black Gordman	2	June 30, 1972	Los Angeles, CA	
John Tolos	4	July 14, 1972	Los Angeles, CA	Wins rematch.
Ernie Ladd	1	July 28, 1972	Los Angeles, CA	
Victor Rivera	1	December 1, 1972	Los Angeles, CA	
Black Gordman	3	March 9, 1973	Los Angeles, CA	
Victor Rivera	2	April 20, 1973	Los Angeles, CA	
Terry Funk	1	July 3, 1973	Odessa, TX	Fictitious title change.
Victor Rivera	3	July 27, 1973	Los Angeles, CA	
John Tolos	5	August 24, 1973	Los Angeles, CA	
Pak Song	1	November 16, 1973	Los Angeles, CA	
John Tolos	6	January 15, 1974	Long Beach, CA	
Porkchop Cash	1	March 22, 1974	Los Angeles, CA	
Black Gordman	4	May 31, 1974	Los Angeles, CA	
Porkchop Cash	2	June 14, 1974	Los Angeles, CA	
Ernie Ladd	2	July 12, 1974	Los Angeles, CA	
Pampero Firpo	2	August 16, 1974	Los Angeles, CA	
John Tolos	7	November 8, 1974	Los Angeles, CA	In San Diego, CA, Firpo defends against Tolos on 74/11/12 but loses to Tolos on 74/11/19.
Pampero Firpo	3	November 22, 1974	Los Angeles, CA	Tolos may continue to be billed as champion in San Diego, CA but loses to Firpo on 74/11/26.
John Tolos	8	November 27, 1974	Los Angeles, CA	
Edouard Carpentier	1	December 25, 1974	San Diego, CA	
Greg Valentine	1	February 14, 1975	Los Angeles, CA	
John Tolos	9	March 27, 1975	Los Angeles, CA	
Greg Valentine	2	April 4, 1975	Los Angeles, CA	
Vacant		April 1975		Valentine gives up the belt to wrestle for the NWA World Heavyweight title
Don Muraco	1	May 2, 1975	Los Angeles, CA	Wins tournament
Les Thornton	1	May 16, 1975	Los Angeles, CA	
Louie Tillet	1	June 13, 1975	Hollywood, CA	
Ernie Ladd	3	October 1975	Philadelphia, PA	Fictitious title change.
Chavo Guerrero	1	October 31, 1975	Los Angeles, CA	
Inferno I	1	January 30, 1976	Los Angeles, California	
Chavo Guerrero	2	February 6, 1976		
Roddy Piper	1	March 12, 1976	Los Angeles, CA	
Chavo Guerrero	3	April 23, 1976		
Crusher Verdu	1	June 11, 1976	Los Angeles, CA	Defeats Gori Guerrero.
Chavo Guerrero Sr.	4	July 16, 1976	Los Angeles, California	
The Hangman	1	September 3, 1976	Los Angeles, California	
Chavo Guerrero	5	October 1, 1976		
Ken Mantell	1	October 15, 1976		
Chavo Guerrero	6	November 19, 1976		
Dr. Hiro Ota	1	November 26, 1976	Los Angeles, California	
Chavo Guerrero	7	December 3, 1976		
Dory Funk Jr.	1	January 14, 1977	Los Angeles, CA	
Chavo Guerrero	8	February 4, 1977	Los Angeles, CA	
Toru Tanaka	1	February 12, 1977	San Bernardino, CA	
The Hangman	2	March 18, 1977	Los Angeles, CA	
Keith Franks	1	May 13, 1977	Los Angeles, CA	
Mando Guerrero	1	May 20, 1977	Los Angeles, CA	
Texas Red	1	July 1, 1977	Los Angeles, CA	
Chavo Guerrero	9	August 6, 1977	Los Angeles, CA	
Roddy Piper	2	August 12, 1977	Los Angeles, CA	
Chavo Guerrero	10	August 19, 1977	San Bernardino, CA	
Texas Red	2	September 7, 1977	Los Angeles, CA	
Choi Sun	1	September 16, 1977	Los Angeles, CA	
Chavo Guerrero	11	September 18, 1977	San Bernardino, CA	
The Masked Canadian	3	November 4, 1977	Los Angeles, CA	
Mando Guerrero	2	December 9, 1977	Los Angeles, CA	
The Masked Canadian	4	December 16, 1977	Los Angeles, CA	
Hector Guerrero	1	February 10, 1978	Los Angeles, CA	
Moondog Lonnie Mayne	1	April 2, 1978	San Bernardino, CA	
Hector Guerrero	2	June 30, 1978	Los Angeles, CA	
Moondog Lonnie Mayne	2	August 11, 1978	Los Angeles, CA	
Vacant		August 13, 1978		Mayne is killed in an auto accident
Chavo Guerrero	12	August 25, 1978	Los Angeles, CA	Wins tournament.
Roddy Piper	5	September 29, 1978	Los Angeles, CA	
Twin Devil #1	1	October 1, 1978	San Bernardino, CA	
Chavo Guerrero	13	December 1978		
Twin Devil #1	2	January 12, 1979	Los Angeles, CA	
Chavo Guerrero	14	January 26, 1979	Los Angeles, CA	
Eddie Mansfield	1	March 16, 1979	Los Angeles, CA	
Chavo Guerrero	15	March 23, 1979	Los Angeles, CA	
Leroy Brown	1	April 26, 1979	Los Angeles, CA	
Al Madril	1	June 15, 1979	Los Angeles, CA	
Bull Ramos	1	June 28, 1979	Los Angeles, CA	Al Hobman is billed as champion in San Bernardino, CA as of 79/08/12.
Pat Barrett	1	August 8, 1979	Bakersfield, CA	
Pat Patterson	1	November 1979	Hawaii	Fictitious title change and Sometime after 79/09/30.
Chavo Guerrero	16	November 16, 1979	Los Angeles, CA	
The Hood (Johnny Mantell)	1	1980		Sometime after 80/01/26.
Chavo Guerrero	17	March 14, 1980	Los Angeles, CA	
The Spoiler #2	1	April 18, 1980	Los Angeles, CA	
Walter Johnson	1	May 9, 1980	Los Angeles, CA	
John Tolos	10	August 8, 1980	Los Angeles, CA	
El Medico	1	October 26, 1980		Sometime after 80/08/24.
Victor Rivera	4	December 1980		Sometime after 80/12/07; still champion as of 81/02/08.
Bobo Brazil	2	1981		
Chris Adams	1	March 01, 1981		
John Tolos	11	1981		
Victor Rivera	5	March 1981		
Mike Masters	1	March 27, 1981	Los Angeles, CA	
Bobo Brazil	3	April 10, 1981	Los Angeles, CA	
Rick Davidson	1	April 17, 1981	Los Angeles, CA	
Victor Rivera	6	May 01, 1981	Los Angeles, CA	
Peter Maivia	1	May 25, 1981	San Jose, CA	
Chino Chou	1	August 7, 1981	Los Angeles, CA	Starts claiming the title after his match against Maivia ends as a draw; Maivia is still billed as champion in San Bernardino, CA as of 81/08/23.
The Monster	1	October 17, 1981		
Timothy Flowers	1	October 18, 1981	Los Angeles, CA	
Gran Hamada	1	November 6, 1981		
Timothy Flowers	2	November 13, 1981		
Bobby Lane	1	December 13, 1982		Sometime after 81/11/29.
Sweet Brown Sugar	1	February 12, 1982	Los Angeles, CA	
Adrian Street	1	March 12, 1982	Los Angeles, CA	
Timothy Flowers	3	May 1982	Los Angeles, CA	
Kid Koby	1	July 18, 1982	San Bernardino, CA	
Black Gordman	5	August 20, 1982	Los Angeles, CA	
Killer Kim	1	September 17, 1982		
Chris Adams	2	1982		
El Monarca	1	November 5, 1982	Los Angeles, CA	
Ciclon Negro	1	November 12, 1982	Los Angeles, CA	
El Monarca	2	November 26, 1982	Los Angeles, CA	
Title retired		December 26, 1982		Promotion closes on 82/12/26; Falco de Oro is billed as champion San Bernardino, CA on 83/07/16
