= Mando Guerrero =

Mexican professional wrestler (born 1950)

Personal information
- Born: Armando Guerrero Llanes; June 9, 1950 (age 76) Mexico City, Mexico
- Family: Guerrero

Professional wrestling career
- Ring name(s): Mando Guerrero; Tercera Dimensión; El Psicópata; Armando Guerrero
- Billed height: 5 ft 9 in (1.75 m)
- Billed weight: 225 lb (102 kg; 16.1 st)
- Trained by: Gory Guerrero
- Debut: 1971
- Retired: 2012

Armando Guerrero Llanes (born June 9, 1950), better known as Mando Guerrero, is a Mexican American retired professional wrestler. He also was the trainer for the Gorgeous Ladies of Wrestling, an all-female professional wrestling promotion. He is a member of the Guerrero family.

== Professional wrestling career ==
Mando is believed to have started wrestling in 1971, teaming alongside his brother Chavo Guerrero Sr. He worked mostly in Los Angeles for NWA Hollywood Wrestling and in 1977, began working for Big Time Wrestling in San Francisco. In 1980, he made his first tour of Japan for New Japan Pro-Wrestling. In 1988, he teamed with his brothers Hector and Chavo for the AWA. There they unsuccessfully challenged for the AWA World Tag Team Championship against Badd Company. In the early 1990s, alongside his brothers, they wrestled in the UWA and EMLL. In 1992, he took on the persona of El Psicopata for AAA. In 1994, he competed at UWF Blackjack Brawl for the UWF Junior Heavyweight Championship.

== Movie stuntman career ==
Guerrero began a career as a Hollywood stuntman in 1977. Gene LeBell suggested Guerrero work as a stuntman after meeting him at his brother Mike LeBell's wrestling promotion. After spending three years as a movie extra, Guerrero began working in stunts. His credits include Miracles (1986), Red Surf (1990), Eve of Destruction (1991), Falling Down (1993), Steal Big Steal Little (1995), My Giant (1998), Critical Mass (2000), Picking Up the Pieces (2000), Submerged (2000), and The Shrink Is In (2001). Guerrero was also hired as a stunt coordinator and choreographer for wrestling scenes in movies.

== Personal life ==
Before entering professional wrestling and stunt work, Guerrero worked in construction and retail sales. He attended the University of Texas El Paso for two years, where he took drama classes. He also attended Rancho Santiago College and Orange Coast College, where he took classes in TV production. Mando Guerrero is the second oldest son of Gory Guerrero and the brother of Chavo Guerrero, Sr., Héctor Guerrero and Eddie Guerrero. His nephew, Chavo Guerrero Jr., also wrestles. Mando Guerrero was married. Mando Guerrero has a son, Eduardo Guerrero, named after his brother Eddie.

== Championships and accomplishments ==
- 50th State Big Time Wrestling
  - NWA Hawaii Heavyweight Championship (2 time)
  - NWA Hawaii Tag Team Championship (1 time) – with Samoa
- All-California Championship Wrestling
  - ACCW Tag Team Championship (1 time) - with Peter Maivia Jr.
- International Wrestling Federation
  - IWF Heavyweight Championship (1 time)
- NWA Hollywood Wrestling
  - NWA Americas Heavyweight Championship (2 times)
  - NWA Americas Tag Team Championship (7 times) – with Tom Jones (2), Hector Guerrero (3), Carlos Mata (1) and Al Madril (1)
  - NWA "Beat the Champ" Television Championship (1 time)
  - Los Angeles Battle Royal (1982)
- Pro Wrestling Illustrated
  - PWI ranked him # 372 of the 500 best singles wrestlers during the "PWI Years" in 2003
- Southwest Championship Wrestling
  - SCW Television Championship (1 time)
- UWC
  - UWC Tag Team Championship (1 time) – with Hector Guerrero
- Western States Alliance
  - WSA Western States Championship (1 time) - with Hector Guerrero
- World Wrestling Association
  - WWA World Trios Championship (1 time) – with Eddie Guerrero and Chavo Guerrero Sr.
