= List of professional wrestling halls of fame =

This is a list of professional wrestling hall of fames. There are many pro wrestling-related halls of fame. Most are (or were) run by a particular promotion, often honoring alumni of that promotion or its predecessors, though some are independent. Most professional wrestling halls of fame do not have a physical building, existing instead merely as a "conceptual" hall of fame, with a notable exception being the Professional Wrestling Hall of Fame and Museum founded in Amsterdam, New York.

== Halls of fame ==
=== General ===
Name	Founder	Maintained by	Years active	Location	Website	Notes	Ref.
Professional Wrestling Hall of Fame	Tony Vellano	—	1999–2021	Wichita Falls, Texas	Yes		
International Professional Wrestling Hall of Fame	Seth Turner	—	2019–	Albany, New York	Yes		

=== Continental ===
Name	Founder	Maintained by	Years active	Location	Website	Notes	Ref.
CAC Hall of Fame		Cauliflower Alley Club	–	New York City	Yes		

=== National ===
Name	Founder	Maintained by	Years active	Location	Website	Notes	Ref.
Canadian Pro-Wrestling Hall of Fame	Chris Maloney	—	2021–present		Yes		
National Wrestling Hall of Fame and Museum		—	1976–	Stillwater, Oklahoma	Yes		
NWA Wrestling Legends Hall of Heroes	Greg Price	—	2007–	Charlotte, North Carolina	Yes		
Glorias de Lucha Libre	Los Villanos	—	2014-	Mexico			
The Professional Wrestling Hall of Fame for Scotland	Bradley Craig	—	2015-	Scotland			
Nippon Puroresu Hall of Fame	Genichiro Tenryu	—	2020-	Japan			

=== Regional ===
Name	Founder	Maintained by	Years active	Location	Website	Notes	Ref.
Kingsport Wrestling Hall of Fame	Beau James	Southern States Wrestling	1999–	Kingsport, Tennessee	No		
Memphis Wrestling Hall of Fame	Randy Hales; Jerry Jarrett	United States Wrestling Association	1994–1997	Memphis, Tennessee	No		
New England Wrestling Hall of Fame	Joseph Bruen	Action Packed Championship Wrestling	2008–	Providence, Rhode Island	Yes		
Pittsburgh Pro Wrestling Hall of Fame	Lou Zygmuncik; Bobby Orkwis	Keystone State Wrestling Alliance	2008–	Pittsburgh, Pennsylvania	Yes		
St. Louis Wrestling Hall of Fame	Larry Matysik	—	2007–	St. Louis, Missouri	Yes		
Southern California Pro-Wrestling Hall of Fame	Cincinnati Red; Jason Peterson; Steven Bryant	SoCalUNCENSORED.com	2001–	Anaheim, California	Yes		
Southern Wrestling Hall of Fame	David Fuller	Iconic Heroes Wrestling Excellence	2009–	Fort Worth, Texas	Yes		
Quebec Wrestling Hall of Fame	Pat Laprade	Alquebec.ss38.ca	2005–		Yes		
Okanagan Pro Wrestling Hall of Fame		Big West Wrestling	2015–		No		

=== Promotions ===
Name	Founder	Maintained by	Years active	Location	Website	Notes	Ref.
AAA Hall of Fame	Joaquín and Dorian Roldán	Lucha Libre AAA World Wide	2007–2009; 2011–	Mexico City, Mexico	No		
ACW Hall Of Fame		Athletik Club Wrestling	2008–2013	Weinheim, Germany	Yes		
AJW Hall of Fame	Takashi Matsunaga; Kunimatsu Matsunaga	All Japan Women's Pro-Wrestling	1998	Tokyo, Japan	No		
BCW Hall of Fame		Border City Wrestling	2003–		Yes		
Chaotic Wrestling Hall of Fame	Jamie Jamikowski	Chaotic Wrestling	2006–	Lowell, Massachusetts	No		
CWE Hall of Fame		Canadian Wrestling's Elite	2015		No		
CZW Hall of Fame	John Zandig	Combat Zone Wrestling	2004, 2009, 2014	Philadelphia, Pennsylvania	Yes		
ECWA Hall of Fame	Jim Kettner	East Coast Wrestling Association	1982–	Newark, Delaware	Yes		
EWP Hall of Fame	Christian Eckstein	European Wrestling Promotion	2010, 2012–	Hanover, Germany	No		
HIW Hall of Fame		High Impact Wrestling Canada	2010–2019	—	Yes		
MCW Hall of Fame	Dan McDevitt; Mark Shrader	Maryland Championship Wrestling	1998–	Dundalk, Maryland	Yes		
NEO Hall of Fame	Kyoko Inoue	NEO Japan Ladies Pro-Wrestling	2005, 2010	Yokohama, Japan	No		
NJPW Greatest Wrestlers Hall of Fame	Naoki Sugabayashi	New Japan Pro-Wrestling	2007, 2009–2011	Tokyo, Japan	Yes		
NCW Hall of Fame		Northern Championship Wrestling	2005–	—	No		
NWA Hall of Fame	R. Bruce Tharpe	National Wrestling Alliance	2005–	—	Yes		
PWA Hall of Fame		Prairie Wrestling Alliance	2009–	—	Yes		
Pro-Wrestling: EVE Hall of Fame	Dann Read and Emily Read	Pro-Wrestling: EVE	2018	United Kingdom	No		
SCW Hall of Fame	Greg Mosorjak	Southern Championship Wrestling	1997–2004	Raleigh, North Carolina	Yes		
Stampede Wrestling Hall of Fame	Bruce and Ross Hart	Stampede Wrestling	1999–2001	Calgary, Alberta	Yes		
ROH Hall of Fame		Ring of Honor	2022-	Garland, Texas	Yes		
TNA Hall of Fame	Dixie Carter	Impact Wrestling	2012–	—	Yes		
WSU Hall of Fame		Women Superstars Uncensored	2009–present				
WCW Hall of Fame		World Championship Wrestling	1993–1995	—	No		
WWE Hall of Fame	Vince McMahon	WWE	1994–1996; 2004–	—	Yes		
wXw Hall of Fame	Peter Wiechers	Westside Xtreme Wrestling	2005; 2009–2012	Oberhausen, Germany	Yes		
WXW Hall of Fame	Afa Anoa'i	World Xtreme Wrestling	2013–2016	Minneola, Florida	Yes		

=== Type ===
Name	Founder	Maintained by	Years active	Location	Website	Notes	Ref.
Hardcore Hall of Fame		2300 Arena	2002, 2005, 2007–2011, 2014–2015, 2021–	Philadelphia, Pennsylvania	No		
Independent Pro Wrestling Hall of Fame		—	2005–		Yes		
Indie Wrestling Hall of Fame		The Cutting Room	2022-	Manhattan	No		
George Tragos/Lou Thesz Professional Wrestling Hall of Fame	Mike Chapman	—	1999–	Waterloo, Iowa	No	Became part of the Dan Gable International Wrestling Hall of Fame and Museum in 2007.	
Women's Wrestling Hall of Fame		—	2021-		Yes		
Glorias de Lucha Libre Hall of Fame	Los Villanos		2014-	Mexico City			

=== Journalistic ===
Name	Founder	Maintained by	Years active	Location	Website	Notes	Ref.
Online World of Wrestling Hall of Fame	Jason Deadrich and David Buckler	OnlineWorldofWrestling.com	2002–	—	Yes		
Pro Wrestling Report Hall of Fame	Dameon Nelson and Dave Herro	Pro Wrestling Report	2013	—	No		
SLAM! Canadian Wrestling Hall of Fame	Greg Oliver	Canadian Online Explorer	2005–	—	Yes		
Wrestling Observer Newsletter Hall of Fame	Dave Meltzer	Wrestling Observer Newsletter	1996–	—	Yes		

== See also ==
- List of professional wrestling awards
- List of halls and walks of fame
