= Eddie Guerrero =

American professional wrestler (1967–2005)

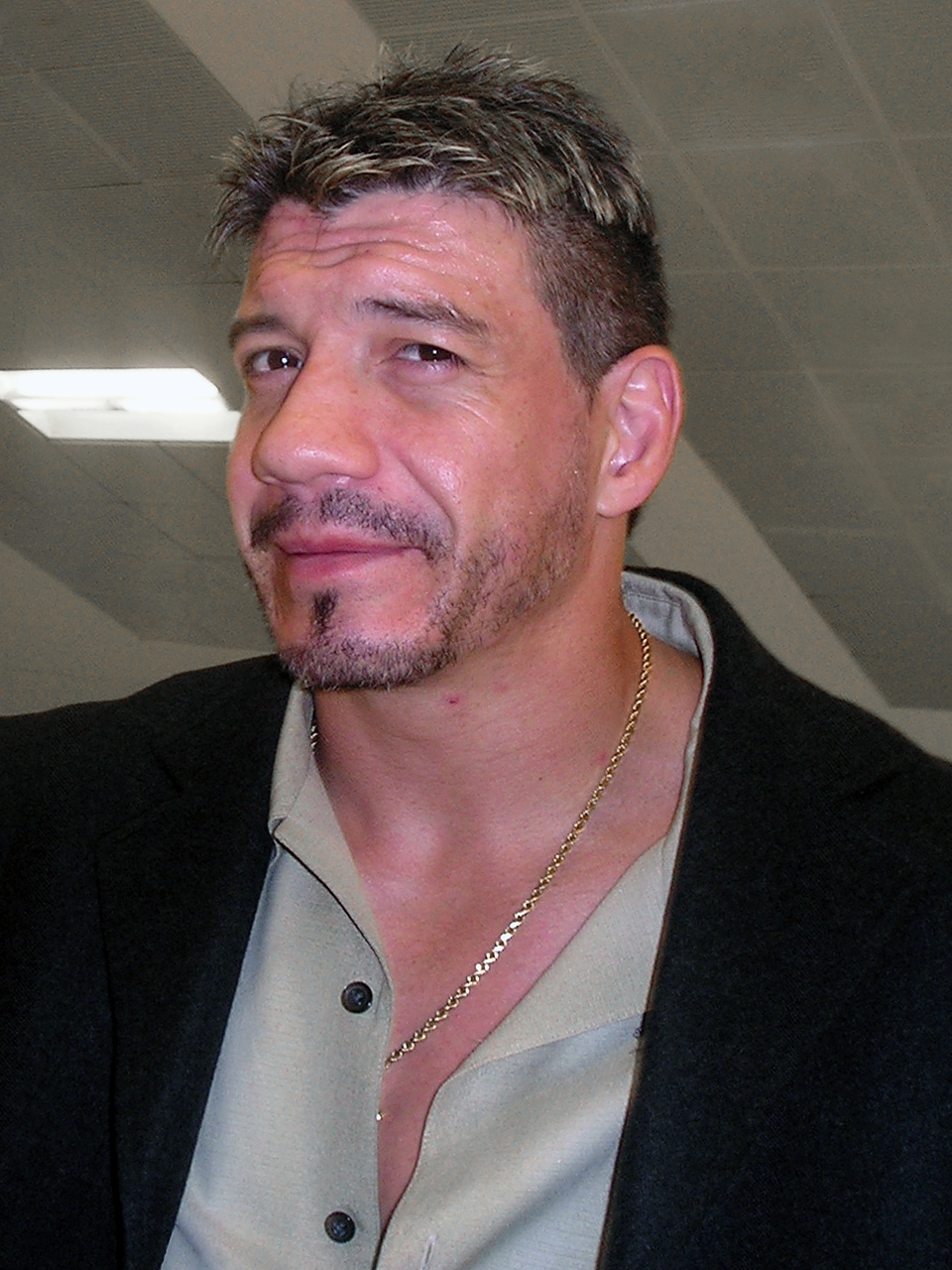
- Guerrero in 2004

Personal information
- Born: Eduardo Gory Guerrero Llanes; October 9, 1967 El Paso, Texas, U.S.
- Died: November 13, 2005 (aged 38) Minneapolis, Minnesota, U.S.
- Spouse: Vickie Guerrero (m. 1990)
- Children: 3, including Shaul
- Family: Guerrero

Professional wrestling career
- Ring name(s): Black Tiger (II); El Caliente; Eddie Guerrero; Eddy Guerrero; Gory Guerrero Jr. Máscara Mágica; Latino Heat
- Billed height: 5 ft 8 in (173 cm)
- Billed weight: 220 lb (100 kg)
- Billed from: El Paso, Texas, U.S.
- Trained by: Gory Guerrero
- Debut: September 5, 1986

Eduardo Gory Guerrero Llanes (October 9, 1967 – November 13, 2005) was an American professional wrestler. He was best known for his tenures in World Championship Wrestling (WCW) and the World Wrestling Federation (WWF) / World Wrestling Entertainment (WWE), along with his appearances in Mexico and Japan. A prominent member of the Guerrero wrestling family, he was the son of first-generation wrestler Gory Guerrero, the brother of Chavo Guerrero, Mando Guerrero, and Héctor Guerrero, the uncle of Chavo Guerrero Jr., and the father of Shaul Guerrero.

Guerrero's gimmick was that of "Latino Heat", a crafty, resourceful wrestler who would do anything to win a match. His catchphrase became "I Lie! I Cheat! I Steal!" and was used in one of his entrance themes; he partly used this phrase in the title of his 2005 autobiography, Cheating Death, Stealing Life. Despite being a heel for most of his career, he was popular in and out of the ring and was at the peak of his career as a face during 2003–2005, becoming the top wrestler on the SmackDown brand in 2004. He experienced various substance abuse problems, including alcoholism and an addiction to painkillers; these real-life issues were sometimes incorporated into his storylines.

Guerrero spent much of his early career wrestling on the Mexican professional wrestling scene and forming a popular tag team with Art Barr. After the death of Barr, Guerrero received his first mainstream exposure in the United States in 1995 by joining ECW and winning the ECW World Television Championship two times. Later that year, Guerrero moved to WCW, where he became WCW United States Heavyweight Champion and WCW Cruiserweight Champion and also led the Latino World Order. He left WCW in 2000 after the company failed to elevate him to a main event spot.

He moved to WWF during the Attitude Era with his WCW colleagues Chris Benoit, Dean Malenko and Perry Saturn, who formed a group called the Radicalz. Guerrero went on to win the WWF European Championship and WWF Intercontinental Championship before he was released in 2001 due to addiction issues. After being rehired in 2002, he formed Los Guerreros with his nephew Chavo, winning the WWE Tag Team Championship, and established himself on the SmackDown brand. He climbed to main event status and won the WWE Championship, his sole world championship at No Way Out 2004. He lost the title at The Great American Bash later that year, but remained a popular main eventer until his sudden death on November 13, 2005. He was posthumously inducted into the WWE Hall of Fame, AAA Hall of Fame, Wrestling Observer Newsletter Hall of Fame, and Hardcore Hall of Fame.

== Early life ==
Guerrero was born on October 9, 1967, to his parents Herlinda and Gory Guerrero. He was raised in El Paso, Texas alongside his five siblings, where he graduated from Thomas Jefferson High School (La Jeff) in 1985. He attended the University of New Mexico, and then New Mexico Highlands University on an athletic scholarship. It was there that Guerrero entered collegiate wrestling, though he dropped out after an ankle injury, then moved to Mexico to train as a professional wrestler. He followed in the footsteps of his brothers and father, who had also wrestled in Mexico. As a boy, he would attend the wrestling promotions held by his father Gory Guerrero at the El Paso County Coliseum. Guerrero's father allowed him and his nephew Chavo to wrestle each other during intermissions.

== Professional wrestling career ==
=== Early career (1986–1992) ===
Guerrero debuted in 1986. In 1989, he appeared with World Championship Wrestling (WCW) as a jobber, most notably wrestling Terry Funk. In 1991, he would return for WrestleWar '91, wrestling a dark match, teaming with Ultraman to defeat Huichol and Rudy Boy Gonzalez. Guerrero wrestled as the original "Máscara Mágica" in Consejo Mundial de Lucha Libre (CMLL) until his departure in 1992. He then left the company to pursue a career with Asistencia Asesoría y Administración. Although the Máscara Mágica gimmick was popular, CMLL owned the rights to the character. Guerrero then appeared on a televised AAA show as Máscara Mágica, only to then unmask himself along with the aid of his tag team partner that night, Octagón.

=== Asistencia Asesoría y Administración (1992–1995) ===
In Mexico, Guerrero wrestled mainly for Asistencia Asesoría y Administración (AAA), teaming with El Hijo del Santo as the new version of La Pareja Atómica (The Atomic Pair), the tag team of Gory Guerrero and El Santo.

After Guerrero turned on Santo and allied with Art Barr as "la Pareja del Terror" ("the Pair of Terror"), the duo became arguably the most hated tag team in lucha libre history. Along with Barr, Konnan, Chicano Power, and Madonna's Boyfriend, Guerrero formed los Gringos Locos ("the Crazy Foreigners"), a villainous stable. Guerrero later said that no matter how many people joined los Gringos Locos, the stable was all about Barr. Locos feuded mostly with El Hijo del Santo and his partner Octagón, eventually ending in a Hair vs. Mask match at the first Lucha pay-per-view in America, When Worlds Collide, which they lost. On July 23, 1994, Guerrero and Barr defeated El Hijo del Santo and Octagón for the AAA World Tag Team Championship in a two-out-of-three falls match in the Rosemont Horizon in Rosemont, Illinois. The titles were vacated in November upon Barr's death.

Guerrero and Barr's first break would come when they were noticed in late-1994 by the owner of Extreme Championship Wrestling (ECW), Paul Heyman, and were approached about wrestling for him in 1995. Barr, however, died before he could join ECW with Guerrero.

=== New Japan Pro-Wrestling (1992–1996, 1998) ===
In April 1992, Guerrero began wrestling in Japan for New Japan Pro-Wrestling (NJPW). He participated in the Top of the Super Juniors III tournament, placing seventh with four points. He wrestled his second tour with NJPW in December 1992, where he formed a tag team with El Engendro. In May 1993, he participated in the Top of the Super Juniors IV tournament, this time placing joint second with 12 points.

In 1993, Guerrero adopted the persona of "Black Tiger". In April 1994, he entered the inaugural Super J-Cup, defeating Taka Michinoku in the first round but losing to Wild Pegasus in the quarterfinals. In May 1994, he participated in the inaugural Best of the Super Juniors tournament, again placing joint second with 12 points. In September 1994, he entered a one-night tournament for the vacant IWGP Junior Heavyweight Championship, defeating El Samurai in the first round but losing to Wild Pegasus in the semi-finals. In October 1994, he entered the Super Grade Jr. Heavyweight Tag League with Great Sasuke as his partner, with the duo losing to Shinjiro Otani and Wild Pegasus in the finals. In November 1994, he took part in NJPW's AAA Lucha World series in which he and other members of the NJPW roster faced various wrestlers from Asistencia, Asesoría y Administración de Espectáculos, culminating in a captain's fall match in which Black Tiger and his team of Black Cat, Norio Honaga, and Wild Pegasus defeated El Hijo del Santo and his team of El Mexicano, Máscara Sagrada, and Perro Aguayo.

In June 1995, Black Tiger participated in the Best of the Super Juniors tournament, losing to Wild Pegasus in the semi-finals. In June 1996, he again participated in the Best of the Super Juniors tournament, this time winning by defeating Jushin Thunder Liger in the final. He subsequently received a title shot at IWGP Junior Heavyweight Champion Great Sasuke at The Skydiving-J in Tokyo's Nippon Budokan, but lost the match. He ceased appearing regularly in NJPW in September 1996.

On September 23, 1998, while under contract to World Championship Wrestling, Guerrero (as "Black Tiger") returned to NJPW for a single night as part of its G1 Climax Special event in the Yokohama Arena, teaming with Chris Jericho in an unsuccessful challenge to IWGP Junior Heavyweight Tag Team Champions Shinjiro Otani and Tatsuhito Takaiwa.

=== Extreme Championship Wrestling (1995) ===
Guerrero won the ECW World Television Championship from 2 Cold Scorpio in his debut match for Extreme Championship Wrestling (ECW) on April 8, 1995, at Three Way Dance. He went on to have a series of acclaimed matches with Dean Malenko before they both signed with World Championship Wrestling (WCW) later that year. Guerrero lost the ECW World Television Championship to Malenko on July 21 of that year, but Guerrero regained the title on July 28. Guerrero lost the ECW Television Championship back to 2 Cold Scorpio on August 25. The next day, they had their last match which ended in a draw in a two out of three falls match at the ECW Arena. After the match, the locker room emptied and the two were carried around the ring by their fellow wrestlers while the crowd chanted "please don't go".

=== World Championship Wrestling (1995–2000) ===
==== Beginning (1995–1996) ====
Guerrero returned to WCW in mid-1995 along with Dean Malenko and Chris Benoit with whom he had worked with in NJPW and ECW. Guerrero competed in his first match on August 30, losing to Malenko, which aired on the October 7 episode of Saturday Night. Guerrero made his televised debut in WCW on the September 17 episode of Main Event against Alex Wright in a match which ended in a no contest after Guerrero injured his knee. Guerrero won a rematch against Wright on the October 21 episode of Saturday Night. His first televised pay-per-view appearance was at World War 3 where he competed in the 3-ring, 60-man World War 3 battle royal for the vacant WCW World Heavyweight Championship. Guerrero was one of the final nine men in the battle royal (notably being one of only two men in the group to be under the age of 35, the other being The Giant) until he was tossed out of the ring by Four Horsemen members.

At Starrcade '95: World Cup of Wrestling in December 1995, Guerrero represented WCW in a WCW vs. NJPW World Cup tournament, which saw him losing to Shinjiro Otani in the match, but WCW would go on to win the series at 4–3. In 1996, Guerrero received several shots at the United States Heavyweight Championship against Konnan at Uncensored and Ric Flair at Hog Wild. He feuded with Ric Flair and the Four Horsemen during 1996 after Guerrero's partner Arn Anderson turned on him during a tag team match against Ric Flair and Randy Savage.

==== Championship reigns (1996–1997) ====
In late 1996, he feuded with Diamond Dallas Page after defeating him in a match at Clash of the Champions XXXIII. He started feuding with DDP to steal his nickname of "Lord of the Ring", but lost. Guerrero participated in a tournament for the vacant WCW United States Heavyweight Championship and defeated DDP in the final round at Starrcade to win the United States title in December 1996.

In 1997, Guerrero defended the United States Heavyweight Championship against Scott Norton at Clash of the Champions XXXIV, Syxx in a ladder match at Souled Out, and Chris Jericho at SuperBrawl VII. His reign came to an end at Uncensored when Dean Malenko defeated him for the title. Following the title loss, Guerrero defeated Malenko in a non-title rematch on the next night's Monday Nitro before taking time off. He returned to WCW after a two-month hiatus on the June 9 episode of Monday Nitro and avenged the title loss by interfering in Malenko's title defense against Jeff Jarrett and attacking Malenko, costing him the title and turning heel in the process.

Shortly after his return, Guerrero feuded with Jericho focusing on Jericho's Cruiserweight Championship. He challenged Jericho for the title at Clash of the Champions XXXV but lost. Guerrero demanded a rematch for the title. In the opening match of Fall Brawl, Guerrero defeated Jericho to win the WCW World Cruiserweight Championship. He dropped the title to Rey Misterio Jr. at Halloween Havoc in a title vs. mask match where Misterio's mask was also on the line. On the November 10 episode of Monday Nitro, he regained the Cruiserweight Championship from Misterio, and made a successful title defense against Misterio at World War 3. After retaining the title against Dean Malenko in the opening bout of Starrcade in December 1997, Guerrero dropped the title to Último Dragón the following day on the December 29 episode of Nitro.

==== Latino World Order; Filthy Animals (1998–2000) ====
On the March 9, 1998 episode of Nitro, Guerrero's nephew Chavo Guerrero lost to Booker T in a match. After the match, Guerrero delivered a suplex to Chavo for the main purpose of teaching him a lesson. On the March 12 episode of Thunder, he defeated his nephew Chavo in a match and forced him to become his "slave". At Uncensored, Chavo was forced to support Guerrero when he faced Booker T for Booker's WCW World Television Championship. Guerrero lost the match after receiving a missile dropkick. Guerrero and Chavo feuded with Último Dragón. Chavo lost to Dragón at Spring Stampede. At Slamboree, Guerrero defeated Dragón despite interference from Chavo. After the match, Chavo kissed Eddie and began to display insane behavior. At The Great American Bash, Chavo got an upset victory over Guerrero. They faced each other in a hair vs. hair match at Bash at the Beach which Guerrero won. Continuing to show his crazy behavior Chavo would shave his own head while Guerrero looked on in disbelief. Guerrero saved Chavo from beatings by Stevie Ray, seeming that he would align with Chavo but he wanted his release.

Despite his success and popularity, Guerrero had been one of many wrestlers who were frustrated at never being given a chance to be main event stars in WCW. These frustrations came to a head when Guerrero requested that WCW President Eric Bischoff either push his character or give him a raise for family reasons. Bischoff responded by allegedly throwing coffee at Guerrero (however, in his autobiography, Guerrero states that Bischoff accidentally knocked his coffee off the table and that it was a complete accident that he was hit). Furious, Guerrero demanded Bischoff release him from his contract on a live episode of Nitro. Guerrero then left the company for months, angry at Bischoff for what he had done. Guerrero later returned to WCW, leading to the belief that maybe Guerrero's angry speeches against Bischoff were a work (Guerrero later confirmed it to be a worked shoot). Guerrero would later contradict himself on WWE's DVD Monday Night War claiming that he tried to put personal differences aside for the good of the company, yet found himself angry and outraged once more because of Bischoff's supposed continued refusal to elevate Guerrero and other similar wrestlers. He let Brian Adams pin him and get an upset victory in a match.

On-screen, Guerrero responded to Bischoff's actions by forming the Latino World Order (LWO), which was a take-off of Bischoff's New World Order. The group was an answer to Bischoff's "refusal" to push Latino wrestlers in ways they felt they deserved. The LWO was formed in October when Guerrero returned to WCW, with Héctor Garza and Damien. The group eventually grew to encompass almost all the Mexican wrestlers working for WCW at the time. They mainly feuded with Rey Misterio Jr. and Billy Kidman because they wanted Misterio to join the group. He faced Kidman in a match for the WCW Cruiserweight Championship, but Misterio interfered and helped Kidman win the match and keep the title. However, Guerrero was involved in a car accident on New Year's Day 1999 that cut short the LWO storyline.

After his return on the May 31, 1999 episode of Monday Nitro, Guerrero became a founding member of the Filthy Animals alongside Rey Misterio Jr. and Konnan. They feuded with the Dead Pool (Insane Clown Posse and Vampiro). They received two straight victories over the Dead Pool at Road Wild and Fall Brawl. They next feuded with Revolution (Shane Douglas, Chris Benoit, Dean Malenko, and Perry Saturn). Guerrero was victorious over Saturn by disqualification in a singles match at Halloween Havoc. At Mayhem, the Animals lost to Revolution in a mixed tag team elimination match. Guerrero wrestled his final match for WCW the following day on the November 22, 1999 episode of WCW Monday Nitro, defeating Kidman.

When Vince Russo was fired as WCW booker and replaced by Kevin Sullivan, Guerrero asked for and received a release from his contract on January 19, 2000. He signed with the World Wrestling Federation (WWF) in 2000 along with fellow WCW stars Benoit, Malenko, and Saturn.

=== World Wrestling Federation (2000–2001) ===
Guerrero, Chris Benoit, Dean Malenko and Perry Saturn debuted in the WWF on the January 31, 2000 episode of Raw is War as the Radicalz, interfering in a match involving the New Age Outlaws, establishing themselves as faces. During his first match with the WWF, a tag team match with Perry Saturn against the New Age Outlaws, Guerrero performed a frog splash off the top rope and dislocated his elbow when he landed the move; as a result, he was sidelined for several weeks. Guerrero and Saturn had originally been booked to defeat the New Age Outlaws, but due to his injury, Guerrero panicked and told Road Dogg, who was in the tag team match with Billy Gunn against Guerrero and Saturn, to immediately pin him. After losing their "tryout matches" upon entry, The Radicalz aligned themselves with WWF Champion Triple H and became a heel faction.

In March, Guerrero, who was wrestling as a heel, began pursuing the affections of Chyna, who he referred to as his "mamacita". At the time, Chyna was allies with Chris Jericho and initially rejected his advances. On the April 3 episode of Raw is War, Guerrero faced off against Jericho for the WWF European Championship. During the match, Chyna turned on Jericho and helped Guerrero win, and later explained her actions by declaring that she could not resist his "Latino Heat". After Guerrero abandoned Lita to be attacked by The Dudley Boyz, he and Chyna began a feud with Essa Rios and Lita, ending in a European title defense at Backlash on April 30, which was also billed as the night of Guerrero's prom (he was said to have just earned a GED). Guerrero defeated Rios after arriving at ringside in a 1957 Chevrolet, even wrestling in his tuxedo pants and a bow tie. Guerrero turned face and successfully retained the title against former Radicalz friends Saturn and Malenko in a triple threat match at Judgment Day on May 21, before losing the title to Saturn at Fully Loaded on July 23. The two slowly began to become popular with the fans, but over the next few months friction began to build between Guerrero and Chyna.

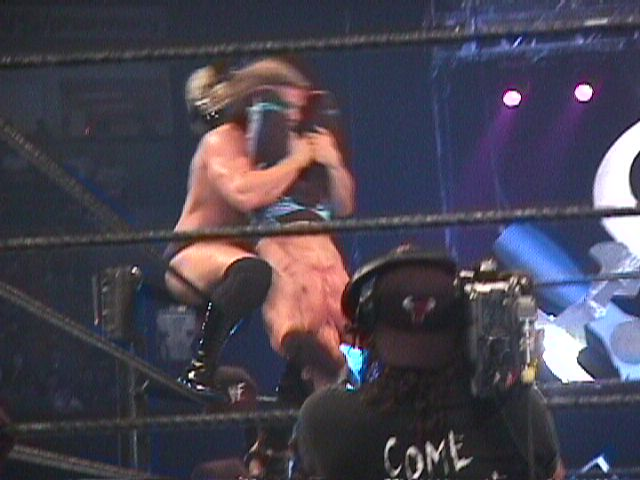
Guerrero (upside down) performing a huracánrana on Val Venis at King of the Ring in June 2000

Chyna was upset when Guerrero pinned her to advance in the King of the Ring tournament. Then at SummerSlam on August 27, Guerrero and Chyna wrestled an intergender tag team match against Trish Stratus and Val Venis, who at the time was the reigning WWF Intercontinental Champion. The Intercontinental Championship was on the line in the match, and whoever scored the pin would win the title. Guerrero's team won the match, but Chyna scored the pin on Trish and became a two-time Intercontinental Champion. Although Guerrero said he did not mind that Chyna was the champion, on the September 4 episode of Raw is War he went to WWF Commissioner Mick Foley and asked to be inserted into Chyna's title defense against Kurt Angle claiming that he did not want Angle to hurt his "mamacita". During the course of the match, Angle knocked down Chyna with the title belt and Guerrero laid on top of her to try to revive her. However, this resulted in Guerrero "accidentally" pinning Chyna as her shoulders were still on the mat, and thus Guerrero won the match and his first Intercontinental Championship. Chyna became visibly uncomfortable as Guerrero began to cheat in order to retain his title, while Guerrero was upset that Chyna was posing for Playboy magazine, even trying to invade the Playboy Mansion to stop the photo shoot. Just when it appeared that Chyna would leave Guerrero, he proposed to her and she accepted. At Unforgiven on September 24, Chyna helped Guerrero in retaining his title against Rikishi. The engagement was called off when Guerrero was caught showering with two of The Godfather's hos (one of whom would later wrestle as Victoria) claiming that "two mamacitas are better than one".

Guerrero turned heel again as a result of the incident. Then, The Radicalz reunited and feuded with the reformed D-Generation X (Chyna, Billy Gunn, Road Dogg, and K-Kwik) (DX). They defeated DX at Survivor Series on November 19 in an elimination tag team match and assisted Triple H in his match with Stone Cold Steve Austin. Guerrero was later defeated by Gunn for the Intercontinental Championship on the November 23 episode of SmackDown!. At Rebellion on December 2, Guerrero and Malenko lost to Gunn and Chyna. Benoit left the group to focus on a singles career while the rest of The Radicalz feuded with Lita and The Hardy Boyz (Matt and Jeff). At Armageddon on December 10, The Radicalz defeated The Hardy Boyz and Lita in an elimination tag team match.

In early 2001, Guerrero feuded with Chris Jericho, Benoit, and X-Pac over Jericho's Intercontinental Championship. At No Way Out on February 25, the four men faced each other in a fatal four-way match, which Jericho won. Guerrero focused on the European Championship, feuding with the champion Test defeating him at WrestleMania X-Seven on April 1 to win his second and final European Championship with help from Saturn and Malenko. On the April 26 episode of SmackDown!, Guerrero would lose the title to Matt Hardy. At Backlash on April 29, Guerrero competed in a Triple threat match for the WWF European Championship but failed to win the title. In April, The Radicalz feuded with Test and his partners. Guerrero eventually left the Radicalz, siding with The Hardy Boyz and Lita. At Insurrextion on May 5, Guerrero defeated Grand Master Sexay. Around this point, Guerrero developed an addiction to pain medication stemming from his 1999 car accident and in May 2001 was sent to rehab, missing the entire Invasion storyline that featured his former fellow WCW (and later ECW) wrestlers. To explain his absence, a storyline was created where Guerrero was "injured" by Albert in a match. On November 9, 2001, he was arrested for drunk driving and was subsequently released by the WWF three days later.

=== Independent circuit (2001–2002) ===
Guerrero started wrestling on the independent circuit after his release from the WWF. His first match was on November 30, 2001, for Insane Championship Wrestling in New York City, losing to Low Ki. He fought in a few matches in Puerto Rico IWA Puerto Rico in December 2001. Then on February 9, 2002, he wrestled in London, England for FWA Revival - King Of England Tournament, where he defeated Scott Parker in the quarter-finals and lost to Doug Williams in semi finals. On February 23, 2002, he faced Super Crazy on the debut show of Ring of Honor known as The Era of Honor Begins to crown the first-ever IWA Intercontinental Champion. Guerrero lost the match. On February 24, he debuted in the Australian promotion World Wrestling All-Stars (WWA) at The Revolution beating the champion Juventud Guerrera and Psicosis in a Triple Threat match for the WWA International Cruiserweight Championship. On March 1, he defeated the champion CM Punk and Rey Mysterio in a Triple Threat match for the IWA Mid-South Heavyweight Championship. He dropped the title back to Punk one day later on March 2. He vacated the WWA Cruiserweight title in April 2002 after returning to the WWF.

=== New Japan Pro-Wrestling (2002) ===
Guerrero returned to New Japan Pro-Wrestling (NJPW) on March 10, 2002, as part of its Hyper Battle tour, this time unmasked and wrestling under his own name. Upon arrival, he aligned himself with Black Tiger and the villainous Team 2000 stable. He made his final appearance with NJPW on March 24, teaming with the other members of Team 2000 to defeat El Samurai, Jushin Liger, Masahito Kakihara, Masayuki Naruse, and Minoru Tanaka in an elimination match in Amagasaki.

=== Return to WWF/E (2002–2005) ===
==== Teaming with Chris Benoit (2002) ====
Guerrero returned to the WWF on the April 1, 2002 episode of Raw, attacking Rob Van Dam. Guerrero feuded with Van Dam, defeating Van Dam for his second and final Intercontinental Championship at Backlash on April 21. After retaining the title against Van Dam at Insurrextion on May 4 and Judgment Day on May 19, Guerrero finally lost the title to Van Dam on the May 27 episode of Raw in a ladder match in which a fan in an Edmonton Oilers jersey pushed him off a ladder. Guerrero then feuded with Stone Cold Steve Austin, but Austin left the WWE before a match could take place. Chris Benoit returned to WWE the night Guerrero lost the title and reunited with Guerrero. Guerrero and Benoit feuded with Ric Flair for a while and Guerrero lost a match to Flair at King of the Ring on June 23.

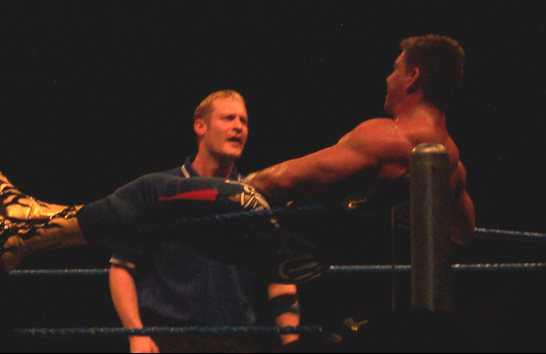
Guerrero lies on a corner, one of his characteristic traits.

On the August 1 episode of SmackDown!, Guerrero and Benoit moved to WWE's SmackDown! brand. Guerrero feuded with Edge, to whom he lost at SummerSlam on August 25. Guerrero continued his feud with Edge, whom he defeated at Unforgiven on September 22; they then had a no disqualification match on the September 26 episode of SmackDown! which Edge won thus ending the rivalry.

==== Los Guerreros (2002–2004) ====
With Benoit focusing on Kurt Angle, Guerrero aligned himself with his nephew Chavo, forming the tag team Los Guerreros. In contrast to a previous WCW storyline with his nephew, Chavo fully agreed with his uncle as their slogan stated: "We lie, we cheat, and we steal, but at least we're honest about it". To push the new tag team, vignettes were produced, which included things such as the two finagling their way into a rich lady's house and throwing a pool party. These segments marked the beginning of the rise of popularity for the team, especially Eddie, who continued to use the mannerisms.

The duo entered the eight-team tournament for the new WWE Tag Team Championship, sneaking past Rikishi and Mark Henry in the opening round, before starting a feud with the newly formed tag team of Kurt Angle and Chris Benoit. In one of the team's definitive moments, Chavo told Benoit that his former friend Guerrero was assaulted by his tag team partner Angle. Benoit ran to make the save, only to have himself locked inside a room. Guerrero then appeared in the room and assaulted Benoit with a steel chair. Benoit and Angle managed to overcome their differences and eventually defeated Los Guerreros in the tournament semi-finals. Later on, Benoit and Angle won the title. Benoit and Angle then fought for a trophy for being the first WWE Tag Team Champions. Much to Benoit's surprise, Los Guerreros helped him win the match.

At Survivor Series on November 17, Los Guerreros faced the new champions Edge and Rey Mysterio and the team of Kurt Angle and Chris Benoit for the titles. Guerrero made Mysterio submit to the Lasso from El Paso to win their first WWE Tag Team Championship. They turned face due to their popularity. They lost the titles to Team Angle (Charlie Haas and Shelton Benjamin) on the February 6, 2003 episode of SmackDown!. Los Guerreros and Team Angle began feuding with each other. Los Guerreros participated at WrestleMania XIX on March 30 as contenders for the WWE Tag Team Championship, along with the team of Chris Benoit and Rhyno. Both teams lost to Team Angle in a triple threat match. At Backlash on April 27, Los Guerreros lost to Team Angle in a rematch.

Chavo legitimately tore his biceps, forcing Guerrero to look for another partner. He chose Tajiri, and they won the WWE Tag Team Championship, Guerrero's second and Tajiri's first at Judgment Day on May 18 by defeating Team Angle in a ladder match. The following week, Guerrero and Tajiri managed to retain their titles against Team Angle by cheating. They also defeated Roddy Piper and his protégé Sean O'Haire in Madison Square Garden on the June 26 episode of SmackDown!. After Guerrero and Tajiri lost the WWE Tag Team Championship to The World's Greatest Tag Team (previously Team Angle) on the July 3 episode of SmackDown!, Guerrero turned on Tajiri, slamming Tajiri through the windshield of his low-rider truck, turning heel once again. This heel run didn't last very long as Guerrero continued to receive cheers from the crowd.

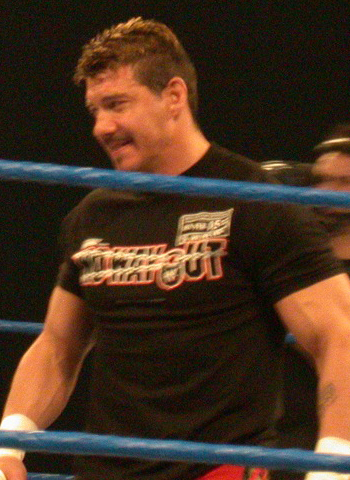
Guerrero in 2004

In July, Guerrero competed in a tournament for the WWE United States Championship. He managed to advance to the final round, defeating Último Dragón and Billy Gunn in the process, where he would meet Chris Benoit. At Vengeance on July 27, Guerrero turned to his cheating tactics, hitting Benoit with the belt at one point in the match. Guerrero tried to get Benoit in trouble by placing the title belt on top of the unconscious Benoit. It did not work, however, since he knocked out the referee earlier with a championship belt shot to the kidneys. The match ended with interference and a Gore from Rhyno, Benoit's partner, who was furious at the team's failure. Guerrero pinned Benoit and won the United States Championship.

At SummerSlam on August 24, Guerrero retained his title by defeating Rhyno, Benoit, and Tajiri in a fatal four-way match. He later began a feud with John Cena, turning face once again. On the September 11 episode of SmackDown!, Guerrero challenged Cena to a "Latino Heat" Parking Lot Brawl match for the United States Championship, which Guerrero won with help from his returning nephew, Chavo. The next week on SmackDown!, Los Guerreros defeated The World's Greatest Tag Team to win the WWE Tag Team Championship, making Guerrero a double champion (beginning Guerrero's third tag title reign).

Guerrero engaged in a feud with Big Show, which involved Guerrero giving Big Show some laxative laced burritos and then later spraying Big Show from a sewage truck. The feud ended when Guerrero lost the United States Championship to Big Show at No Mercy on October 19. Four days later, Los Guerreros lost the WWE Tag Team Championship to the Basham Brothers (Danny and Doug). They began feuding with the Basham Brothers, but failed to regain the championship at Survivor Series on November 16. As Los Guerreros attempted to regain the tag team titles, things began to go downhill between Chavo and Eddie, as animosity began to build. Chavo then attacked and turned on Guerrero after he suffered a beating from the Basham Brothers on the January 8, 2004 episode of SmackDown!. Guerrero feuded with Chavo and defeated him at the Royal Rumble on January 25 to settle their feud. After the match Eddie attacked Chavo causing him to bleed.

==== WWE Champion (2004) ====
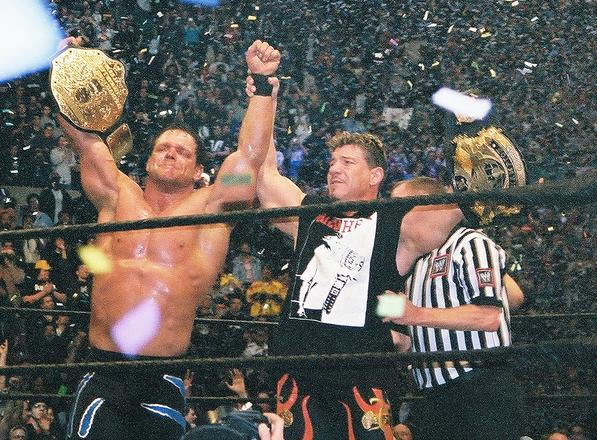
Guerrero (right) with close friend Chris Benoit celebrating as reigning world champions at WrestleMania XX

When Chris Benoit jumped to the Raw brand after winning the Royal Rumble match, using his title shot to go for Triple H's World Heavyweight Championship, Guerrero won a 15-man Royal Rumble match on the January 29 episode of SmackDown! to earn a shot at the WWE Championship. After becoming the number one contender, Guerrero elevated himself to main event status and began feuding with the champion Brock Lesnar, whom he defeated to win the WWE Championship in the main event of No Way Out on February 15, his first world championship win in WWE. The victory made him a Triple Crown and Grand Slam Champion in the process. Guerrero's next feud was with Kurt Angle, whom he defeated at WrestleMania XX on March 14 to retain his title in his first big defense. At the end of WrestleMania, Guerrero celebrated in the ring with longtime friend Chris Benoit, who had just won the World Heavyweight Championship.

On the March 25 episode of SmackDown!, Guerrero started a feud with fellow Texan John "Bradshaw" Layfield (JBL) after JBL interrupted Guerrero's title match with Booker T. The rivalry would soon turn personal when at a non-televised live event, JBL caused Guerrero's mother to suffer a (kayfabe) heart attack while in attendance at ringside. At Judgment Day on May 16, Guerrero defended his WWE title against JBL, retaining the title after getting himself disqualified, hitting JBL with the championship title. The match witnessed Guerrero bleed heavily mid-way in the match as a result of Guerrero performing a bladejob after a stiff headshot ringside with a chair from JBL. It was later explained that Guerrero cut too deep, thus hitting an artery. After the match concluded, Guerrero was persuaded to go to the hospital by WWE producer Bruce Prichard where his wound was stitched up and he received IV fluids.

"The chair shot was very stiff. [...] Eddie went deep. Very deep. I had no idea until I watched that tape back how much blood there was, I have seen some bloodbaths in Japan, Europe, Mexico and Texas-I had been in several-I have never seen anything like that."

— Layfield recounting the match between him and Guerrero at the 2004 Judgment Day event.

At The Great American Bash on June 27, Guerrero defended the title against JBL in a Texas bullrope match. JBL won after Kurt Angle (who was General Manager of SmackDown! at the time) reversed the decision after Guerrero appeared to have retained the title. On the July 8 episode of SmackDown!, Guerrero pulled a switcharoo with Shannon Moore, who was wrestling as "El Gran Luchadore" and wore the costume. On the July 15 episode of SmackDown!, Guerrero faced JBL in a steel cage match for the WWE title where El Gran Luchadore appeared again and cost Guerrero the match; he later revealed himself as Kurt Angle. Guerrero continued his feud with Angle.

At SummerSlam on August 15, Guerrero lost to Angle after submitting to his ankle lock. Guerrero then allied himself with Big Show. Each week Angle and his new allies Luther Reigns and Mark Jindrak began targeting Guerrero and Big Show. Guerrero defeated Reigns in a singles match at No Mercy on October 3. General Manager Theodore Long booked a Survivor Series Elimination match between a team led by Guerrero and a team led by Angle. Guerrero's team consisted of himself, Big Show, John Cena (replacing the originally chosen Rey Mysterio), and Rob Van Dam. At Survivor Series on November 14, Guerrero's team defeated Angle's team.

==== Final storylines (2004–2005) ====
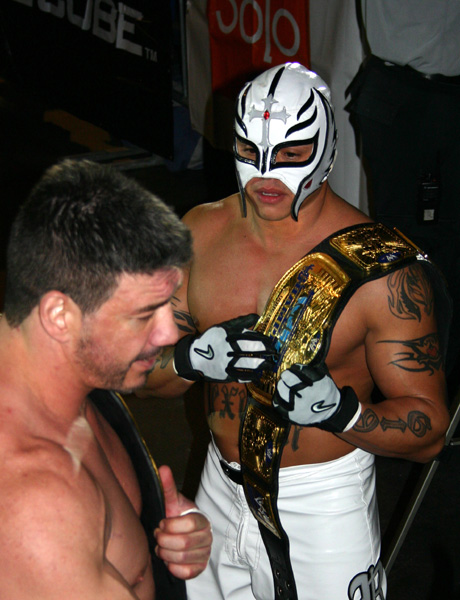
Guerrero (left) and Mysterio with the WWE Tag Team Championship belts

Guerrero, along with Booker T and The Undertaker, then challenged JBL for a WWE Championship rematch. Along the way, Guerrero found a partner in Booker T. At Armageddon on December 12, Guerrero and Booker T's initial teamwork broke away, and the match ended with JBL pinning Booker T following the Clothesline From Hell. Afterwards, Guerrero and Booker T briefly and unsuccessfully attempted to win the WWE Tag Team Championship. At the Royal Rumble on January 30, 2005, Guerrero entered the namesake match at #1 and lasted 28:11 before being eliminated by Edge. In a skit before the Royal Rumble match, he drew his number the same time Ric Flair drew his. In an attempt to get a better draw, Guerrero switched his number with Flair's (and stole Flair's wallet in the process). Theodore Long made him return both items before the match. Flair would enter at #30.

At No Way Out on February 20, Guerrero teamed up with longtime friend and sometimes rival, Rey Mysterio and defeated the Basham Brothers to win his final title, the WWE Tag Team Championship for a fourth time, with it being Mysterio's third reign. Many expected the new champions to defend their titles at WrestleMania 21 on April 3, but after encouragement from Chavo, Guerrero challenged Mysterio to a one-on-one match instead so they could "bring the house down". The two wrestled a match at WrestleMania with Mysterio getting the win. Although visibly frustrated, Guerrero congratulated his partner. After several mishaps in the weeks following WrestleMania, the growing tension between Guerrero and Mysterio finally erupted when they lost the WWE Tag Team Championship to the new team MNM (Johnny Nitro and Joey Mercury) on the April 21 episode of SmackDown!. Although the next week they received a rematch to regain the titles, Guerrero abandoned Mysterio, whom he had considered "his family" earlier in the show, costing them the match.

At the end of the May 5 episode of SmackDown!, he saved Mysterio from an attack by Chavo and MNM, before attacking Mysterio, leaving him bruised and bloody after suplexing him onto a set of steel steps, turning heel in the process. Guerrero then adopted a new, brooding gimmick. During this time, he also stopped driving his low-riders down the ring and walked to the ring slowly with a frown on his face, gained a new theme which was a darker remix of "Lie, Cheat, And Steal" and started using his other finishing move, the Lasso from El Paso, more often. At Judgment Day on May 22, Guerrero lost to Mysterio by disqualification after hitting Mysterio with a chair.

On the June 30 episode of SmackDown!, Guerrero threatened to reveal a secret about Mysterio and his son Dominik. The storyline grew to involve the families of both men, with both sides pleading for Guerrero not to reveal the secret. Mysterio defeated Guerrero again at The Great American Bash on July 24, a match with a stipulation that if Guerrero lost, he would not tell the secret. Yet Guerrero revealed the secret anyway on the following episode of SmackDown! – telling Dominik and the audience that Guerrero was his real father. In the following weeks, Guerrero revealed the details of the secret in a series of what he called "Eddie's Bedtime Stories". During that time he now had a dark comical gimmick. He claimed that he had a child out of wedlock (Dominik) while his marriage was going through hard times. He claimed he then allowed Mysterio and his wife, who were "having trouble conceiving", to adopt the child as their own. At SummerSlam on August 21, Guerrero lost a ladder match over Dominik's custody to Mysterio. On the September 9 episode of SmackDown!, their feud ended when Guerrero defeated Mysterio in a steel cage match.

Following his feud with Mysterio, Guerrero was named number one contender to the World Heavyweight Championship and given a title match with Batista. Despite this, Guerrero quickly proclaimed himself to be Batista's friend. Batista was well aware of Guerrero's sneaky reputation, and despite eventually accepting his friendship (initially to keep an eye on him), Batista would continually play mind games with Guerrero to expose his true intentions. A series of matches with MNM only supported Batista's suspicions that Guerrero was up to no good, as Guerrero appeared to have reverted to his cheating ways. In response to Batista's suspicions, Guerrero helped Batista win a match against his tag team partners, JBL and Christian. Batista defeated Guerrero at No Mercy on October 9 to retain the World Heavyweight Championship in what would be Guerrero's last pay-per-view match. During the match, Guerrero struggled with a decision about whether or not to use a steel chair to secure the victory, eventually opting not to use it and losing as a result. He would make his entrance the following SmackDown! using his signature low rider and old entrance theme with Batista, and turning him face once again. Guerrero wrestled his last match on the November 11 episode of SmackDown!, defeating Mr. Kennedy by disqualification using his signature lie, cheat, and steal tactics, which allowed him to advance to the SmackDown! Survivor Series team. After the match, Kennedy hit him with a steel chair. On the date of his death, a triple threat match between himself, Batista, and Randy Orton was supposed to take place to air on the following episode of SmackDown! for the World Heavyweight Championship, in which Guerrero had been booked to win the title so Batista could take time off to heal from an injured back, but that was later denied by Batista in his own book. Yet Stephanie McMahon was adamant that Guerrero was supposed to win the World Heavyweight Championship, thus starting his second main title reign. Orton was given Guerrero's spot in the traditional Survivor Series elimination match between the Raw and SmackDown! brands at Survivor Series on November 27, which SmackDown! would win, with Orton being the sole survivor.

== Professional wrestling style and persona ==
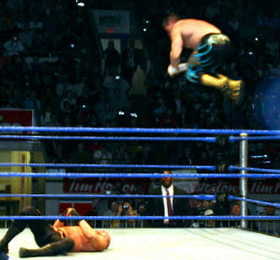
Guerrero performing his signature frog splash

After the death of his friend Art Barr, Guerrero started to use the frog splash in tribute, which became his most common and well known finishing move. He also used to perform 3 sequential vertical suplexes, calling the triad the "Three Amigos”. He would also use a variation of the Texas Cloverleaf submission hold, dubbing it the "Lasso from El Paso".

Towards the end of his life and career, Guerrero was known for driving lowrider cars to the ring during his entrances. He started doing this while tag teaming with his nephew Chavo and continued doing it after the team split in 2004, along with Guerrero carrying on the wider "Lie, Cheat and Steal" gimmick that he and Chavo used as a tag team. He stopped doing this in May 2005 after turning on Rey Mysterio, instead showing a more sinister and spiteful side to his character. He briefly resumed driving the low rider again in October after turning face following his feud with Batista.

Also in his later career, Guerrero was known for cheating and breaking rules to win matches, even as a face (heroic) character, most of whom typically try to follow the rules. As a face, this would be used to give his character the quality of a lovable rogue and, at times, balance out cheating carried out by other heels by taking advantage for himself. As a heel, it would instead be used to draw heat from the crowd by making him appear cowardly or dishonest, while gaining an unfair advantage on his opponents.

One such tactic, often included in his matches, saw Guerrero employ what commentator Tazz would refer to as “The Smoking Gun"; Guerrero would retrieve a chair, championship belt, or other unauthorized item and toss it to his opponent as the referee turned around from a distraction. As the referee began assessing the issue, returning the item to its original location, or arguing with Guerrero's opponent, Guerrero would gain an advantage of some sort to win the match. Some matches had Guerrero smack a chair on the mat and toss the chair to his opponent and lie on the ground, pretending to have been struck by the chair. When the referee turned around and saw the opponent had the chair, they would assume it was used on Guerrero and call a disqualification in Guerrero's favor. Guerrero was also known for his resourcefulness via other means, such as at WrestleMania XX by rolling up Kurt Angle after loosening his own boot while trapped in an ankle lock.

== Other media ==
On March 13, 2004, Guerrero (WWE Champion), along with Big Show, Trish Stratus and Chris Jericho, made a guest appearance on MADtv as he and the other wrestlers "beat up" Frank Caliendo (portraying Jay Leno) while Aries Spears (portraying The Tonight Show Band leader Kevin Eubanks) watched on. There have also been several DVDs and books released about his life and career, including Cheating Death, Stealing Life: The Eddie Guerrero Story (DVD, 2004), Cheating Death, Stealing Life: The Eddie Guerrero Story (book, released on December 5, 2005), and Viva La Raza: The Legacy of Eddie Guerrero (DVD 2008). Additionally, the song "We Lie, We Cheat, We Steal" that he performed with Chavo was released on the WWE Originals CD.

Guerrero's catchphrase during the latter part of his career with WWE was "Viva La Raza" (which is Spanish for "Long Live the Race"). In the mid parts of his career, Guerrero took the title of "Latino Heat", which was also his theme song in the early 2000s. He has also been featured in WWE's Best Smackdown matches video of its 15-year Friday Night span, upon the show being moved to Thursday nights on Thursday, January 15, 2015, he features in 5 of the top 15 matches including the number 1 spot where his No Disqualification bout with Edge topped the list of best Smackdown matches.

On May 26, 2024, Eddie was the subject of the Biography: WWE Legends.

=== Video games ===
Key
†	Denotes video games that were released posthumously

Year	Game	Notes
1997	WCW vs. the World	First video game appearance
1997	WCW vs. nWo: World Tour	
1997	Virtual Pro Wrestling 64	Only released in Japan
1998	WCW Nitro	
1998	Shin Nippon Pro Wrestling: Toukon Retsuden 3	Only released in Japan
1998	WCW/nWo Revenge	
1999	WCW/nWo Thunder	Unlockable character
1999	WCW Mayhem	Last WCW video game appearance
2000	WWF No Mercy	First WWF/E video game appearance
2000	WWF SmackDown! 2: Know Your Role	
2001	WWF Betrayal	
2001	WWF With Authority!	Online game
2001	WWF Road to WrestleMania	
2001	WWF SmackDown! Just Bring It	
2002	WWF Raw	
2002	WWE Road to WrestleMania X8	
2002	WWE SmackDown! Shut Your Mouth	
2002	Legends of Wrestling II	
2003	WWE Crush Hour	
2003	WWE WrestleMania XIX	
2003	WWE Raw 2	
2003	WWE SmackDown! Here Comes the Pain	
2004	Showdown: Legends of Wrestling	
2004	WWE Day of Reckoning	
2004	WWE Survivor Series	Cover athlete
2004	WWE SmackDown! vs. Raw	
2005	WWE WrestleMania 21	
2005	WWE Aftershock	Cover athlete (PAL version)
2005	WWE Day of Reckoning 2	
2005	WWE SmackDown! vs. Raw 2006	Last video game to be released while Guerrero was alive Released posthumously in North America
2006	WWE SmackDown vs. Raw 2007†	"Legend wrestler"
2007	WWE SmackDown vs. Raw 2008†	PSP version only "Legend wrestler"
2011	WWE All-Stars†	
2011	WWE '12†	"Legend wrestler"
2012	WWE WrestleFest†	
2012	WWE '13†	Legend wrestler
2013	WWE 2K14†	"Legend wrestler"
2014	WWE SuperCard†	
2016	WWE 2K17†	Unlockable wrestler through in-game currency
2017	WWE 2K18†	Unlockable wrestler through in-game currency
2018	WWE 2K19†	Unlockable wrestler through in-game currency
2019	WWE 2K20†	Unlockable wrestler through in-game currency
2020	WWE 2K Battlegrounds†	
2022	WWE 2K22†	
2023	WWE 2K23†	Unlockable through in-game currency
2024	WWE 2K24†	Unlockable through Showcase
2025	WWE 2K25†	Unlockable through in-game currency
2026	WWE 2K26†	Unlockable through in-game currency

== Personal life ==
From 1990 until his death in 2005, Guerrero was married to Vickie Guerrero, with whom he had two daughters: Shaul Marie Guerrero and Sherilyn Amber Guerrero, both of whom became wrestlers. He also had another daughter named Kaylie Marie Guerrero during his two-year separation from Vickie.

Following several injuries in his career during the 1990s, Guerrero became addicted to alcohol and drugs, including painkillers and performance-enhancing substances; he suffered three drug overdoses prior to being released from the WWF in 2001, following which he worked towards getting sober.

Guerrero was a close friend of fellow wrestlers Art Barr, Chris Benoit, Kurt Angle, Dean Malenko, Rey Mysterio, Matt Hardy, Chris Jericho, JBL, and Batista. He was a born-again Christian.

== Death ==
On November 13, 2005, Guerrero's nephew Chavo found him unconscious in his hotel room at the Marriott Hotel City Center in Minneapolis. Chavo later explained that Guerrero had passed out in his hotel bathroom with a toothbrush in his hand and that the basin water was running; he added that he was still alive when he was discovered. Upon the ambulance's arrival at the scene, he was pronounced dead at the age of 38. An autopsy revealed his death was the result of acute heart failure. His funeral service was officiated by "Superstar" Billy Graham.

== Legacy ==
The episodes of Raw on November 14, 2005, and SmackDown! on November 18, 2005, were both filmed on November 13 and each aired as tributes to Guerrero. All storylines were put on hold and WWE employees were not required to perform, although several matches took place, including one featuring Chavo. Raw started with all the wrestlers and numerous backstage personnel onstage as Vince McMahon addressed the live crowd, before finishing with a ten-bell salute. In addition to the Raw and SmackDown! tribute shows, TNA dedicated its Genesis event (which aired the evening of his death) to Guerrero, while ROH renamed their next show to Night of Tribute. OVW, WWE's then-developmental territory, also paid tribute to Guerrero on their television taping. Many of the wrestlers there wore armbands with Guerrero's initials on them. Other wrestlers, primarily Guerrero's nephew Chavo and friends Mysterio and Christian Cage, began paying tribute to him in their matches by using his Frog Splash finisher. CZW also paid tribute to Guerrero with a ten-bell salute during one of their events. Mysterio and CM Punk dedicated some of their matches to Guerrero. 3 Doors Down's song "Here Without You" and Johnny Cash's "Hurt" were used in tribute videos for Guerrero.

Just five months following his death Guerrero was posthumously inducted into the WWE Hall of Fame as a part of the class of 2006. He was inducted by Chris Benoit, Rey Mysterio and Chavo Guerrero. That same year he was also inducted into the Wrestling Observer Newsletter Hall of Fame.

In a poll of the WWE roster, Guerrero was ranked the 11th-greatest professional wrestler of all time. Ric Flair ranked Guerrero as one of his top 10 opponents, while Chris Jericho said he was the best performer in the world when he was "on". Kurt Angle named Guerrero as the second-greatest professional wrestler of all time, behind Shawn Michaels, stating: "[Eddie] could have been the absolute greatest of all time because when I wrestled, he was still in that top three we were talking about, so Eddie had it all. He was so entertaining, but he also had all the technique. He was such a great wrestler and he got it. He got finishes. He knew how to structure them." WWE named Guerrero one of the most beloved and accomplished WWE superstars of all time, one of the best technical wrestlers ever, and the fifth-greatest performer in the history of the company's SmackDown brand. In 2024 IGN ranked Guerrero as the 13th greatest pro wrestler of all time writing "A hero and inspiration to Mercedes Mone and countless others, Eddie was a one of a kind talent who'd sadly only scratched the surface of his career when he passed."

When reflecting on Guerrero's legacy in 2019 Eric Beaston of Bleacher Report noted "Guerrero proved that a talented wrestler, whose in-ring work was unmatched by his peers and whose charisma was undeniable, could leapfrog Superstars gifted with height or girth, and become the top star in sports entertainment." He also dubbed Guerrero a "cultural hero." calming that he "made it a realistic dream for other Latino wrestlers with dreams of succeeding at the highest level of sports-entertainment to make a go of it."

On November 18, 2025, the El Paso City Council officially declared Eddie Guerrero Day in the city. His family was in attendance to officially accept the proclamation. In April 2026, a mural dedicated to Guerrero was painted by artist H. Doyle in El Paso's Hispanic neighborhood El Segundo Barrio.

== Championships and accomplishments ==
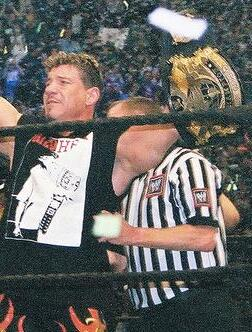
Guerrero as WWE Champion in March 2004

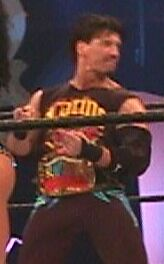
Guerrero as WWF European Champion in June 2000

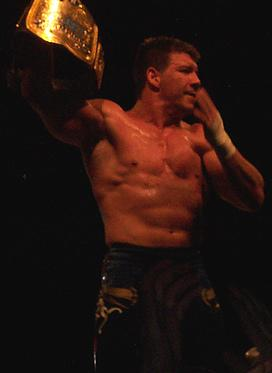
Guerrero is a four-time WWE Tag Team Champion with three different partners

- Asistencia Asesoría y Administración
  - AAA World Tag Team Championship (1 time) – with Art Barr
  - AAA Hall of Fame (Class of 2008)
- Cauliflower Alley Club
  - Men's Wrestling Award (2008) as part of The Wrestling Guerreros
- Extreme Championship Wrestling
  - ECW World Television Championship (2 times)
- El Paso Athletic Hall of Fame
  - Class of 2023
- Hardcore Hall of Fame
  - Class of 2015
- Independent Wrestling Association Mid-South
  - IWA Mid-South Heavyweight Championship (1 time)
- Latin American Wrestling Association
  - LAWA Heavyweight Championship (1 time)
- New Japan Pro-Wrestling
  - Best of the Super Juniors III (1996)
  - Junior Heavyweight Super Grade Tag League (1996) – with The Great Sasuke
- Pro Wrestling Federation
  - PWF World Tag Team Championship (1 time) – with Héctor Guerrero
- Pro Wrestling Illustrated
  - Comeback of the Year (1999)
  - Inspirational Wrestler of the Year (2002, 2004)
  - Stanley Weston Award (2005)
  - Ranked No. 2 of the top 500 wrestlers in the PWI 500 in 2004
  - Ranked No. 81 of the top 500 wrestlers of the "PWI Years" in 2003
  - Ranked No. 18 of the top 100 tag teams of the "PWI Years" with Art Barr in 2003
- World Championship Wrestling
  - WCW Cruiserweight Championship (2 times)
  - WCW United States Heavyweight Championship (1 time)
  - WCW United States Championship Tournament (1996)
  - Battlebowl Championship Ring (1996)
  - World Cup Of Wrestling (1995) - with Randy Savage, Lex Luger, Johnny B. Badd, Sting, Chris Benoit, and Alex Wright
- World Wrestling All-Stars
  - WWA International Cruiserweight Championship (1 time)
- World Wrestling Association
  - WWA Trios Championship (1 time) – with Chavo Guerrero and Mando Guerrero
  - WWA World Welterweight Championship (1 time)
- World Wrestling Federation/World Wrestling Entertainment
  - WWE Championship (1 time)
  - WWF/WWE Intercontinental Championship (2 times)
  - WWE United States Championship (1 time)
  - WWF European Championship (2 times)
  - WWE Tag Team Championship (4 times) – with Chavo Guerrero (2), Tajiri (1) and Rey Mysterio (1)
  - WWE Hall of Fame (Class of 2006)
  - WWE United States Championship Tournament (2003)
  - 15-man SmackDown! Royal Rumble (2004)
  - Eleventh Triple Crown Champion
  - Sixth Grand Slam Champion
- Wrestling Observer Newsletter
  - Best on Interviews (2005)
  - Feud of the Year (1994) Los Gringos Locos vs. AAA
  - Feud of the Year (1995) vs. Dean Malenko
  - Most Charismatic (2004, 2005)
  - Tag Team of the Year (1994) with Art Barr as La Pareja del Terror
  - Tag Team of the Year (2002) with Chavo Guerrero as Los Guerreros
  - Wrestling Observer Newsletter Hall of Fame (Class of 2006)

== Luchas de Apuestas record ==
Winner (wager)	Loser (wager)	Location	Event	Date	Notes
Eddie Guerrero (hair)	Ari Romero (hair)	Ciudad Juárez, Chihuahua	Live event	1987	
Eddie Guerrero (hair)	Negro Casas (hair)	Ciudad Juárez, Chihuahua	Live event	N/A	
El Hijo del Santo and Octagón (masks)	Eddie Guerrero and Art Barr (hair)	Los Angeles, California	AAA When Worlds Collide	November 6, 1994	
Rey Mysterio Jr. (mask)	Eddie Guerrero (Championship)	Las Vegas, Nevada	Halloween Havoc	October 26, 1997	
Eddie Guerrero (hair)	Chavo Guerrero Jr. (hair)	San Diego, California	Bash at the Beach	July 12, 1998	

== See also ==
- List of premature professional wrestling deaths
- List of professional wrestling memorial shows
