= Billy Anderson (wrestler) =

American professional wrestler (born 1956)

Personal information
- Born: William Laster; November 12, 1956 (age 69) Ypsilanti, Michigan, U.S.

Professional wrestling career
- Ring name(s): Billy Anderson; Bill Anderson; Black Knight; White Shadow; Mercenario I Star Man
- Billed height: 6 ft 2 in (1.88 m)
- Billed weight: 229 lb (104 kg)
- Trained by: Kurt von Steiger
- Debut: June 16, 1974
- Retired: 2001

William Laster (born November 12, 1956) is an American professional wrestler and trainer better known by his ring name Billy Anderson best known for working in California and Arizona, the World Wrestling Federation from 1983 to 1993, American Wrestling Association, and Japanese and Mexican promotions during the 1980s and early 1990s.

== Professional wrestling career ==
Anderson made his professional wrestling debut in 1974 against Buddy Rose in Tucson, Arizona. In 1982, Anderson became the very last NWA "Beat the Champ" Television Champion when he defeated Killer Kim in Los Angeles.

Anderson made his debut in the World Wrestling Federation (WWF) in 1983. He would spend many years with the WWF as an enhancement talent, performing whenever they were in Los Angeles or Phoenix. He would work against Adrian Adonis, Bret Hart, Randy Savage, Jake Roberts, Harley Race, One Man Gang, and Tito Santana.

In 1986, Anderson worked in Mexico and became the very first WWA World Heavyweight Champion defeating Tinieblas. He dropped the title to Tinieblas in January 1987.

From 1986 to 1988 Anderson worked for the American Wrestling Association, performing whenever they appeared in Las Vegas. In 1988, he became the promoter for Western States Wrestling Association, a position he retained until 1991.

In November 1988, Anderson became the masked Black Knight in the WWF. During this time he also refereed matches and served as the ring announcer for Los Angeles shows. He left the WWF in 1991.

In 1990, he jointed Herb Abrams's Universal Wrestling Federation (Herb Abrams), retaining his Black Knight persona. He left in 1991.

In 1991, he traveled to Tijuana, Mexico with Tim Patterson and his student Louie Spicolli, with whom he formed a stable known as "Los Mercenarios Americanos" ("The American Mercenaries"). They were a trio of masked villains who feuded with Los Villanos (Villano I, Villano III, Villano IV and Villano V). The Mercenarios were forced to unmask in July 1991.

Then in late 1991, the Los Mercenarios Americanos made their debut in Japan for Frontier Martial-Arts Wrestling. They disbanded in 1992. In 1992, he worked as Star Man.

In January 1993, Anderson returned to World Wrestling Federation as the masked White Shadow. His last match in the WWF was a lost to Kamala (wrestler) on April 6, 1993 for WWF Wrestling Challenge which aired on April 25.

In 1994, he worked for the Las Vegas-based promotion National Wrestling Conference. He retired from wrestling in 1996 and became the promoter for Empire Wrestling Federation in San Bernardino, California.

After wrestling, Anderson trained many wrestlers at a school in California. He trained Ultimate Warrior, Sting, Cheerleader Melissa, Louie Spicolli, Rocky Romero, Candice LeRae, TJ Perkins, Frankie Kazarian Steve DiSalvo, Angel of Death, Keiji Sakoda, Tom Howard (wrestler), Cincinnati Red, Tim Patterson, Doug Anderson (father of Cheerleader Melissa), and many others. His school would shut down in 2001.

== Personal life ==
After retiring from wrestling and training wrestlers, Anderson accepted two invitations from Armed Forces Entertainment to travel overseas to entertain the troops. He went around world in Korea, Japan, Okinawa, Guam, Hawaii, Kuwait, Afghanistan, Uzbekistan, Egypt, Bahrain and Turkey.

He was best friends with Louie Spicolli, who he trained and teamed with in Japan and Mexico until Spicolli's death in 1998.

Anderson has been an active member of the Cauliflower Alley Club since 1985 and was honored in 2000. He was also inducted in the Southern California Pro Wrestling and Western States Halls of Fame.

In October 2009, Anderson released his first book, "Big” Bill Anderson Remembers… The School of Wrestling! The book covers Anderson's career, the wrestling school and the students he taught.

In April 2013, Anderson released his second book, "Big" Bill Anderson Remembers....His Fallen Friends of Wrestling! which focused on the core of his career and his friends that have passed away. Superstar Billy Graham wrote the forward to the book.

== Championships and accomplishments ==
- American Wrestling Federation
  - AWF Heavyweight Championship (1 time)
- California Championship Wrestling
  - CCW Tag Team Championship (2 times) – with Tim Patterson and Mercenario #2
- NWA Hollywood Wrestling
  - NWA "Beat the Champ" Television Championship (1 time)
- Southern California Pro-Wrestling Hall of Fame
  - Class of 2007
- World Wrestling Association
  - WWA World Heavyweight Championship (1 time)
  - WWA World Trios Championship (3 times) – with Louie Spicolli and Tim Patterson
- Other titles
  - Arizona Heavyweight Champion (1 time)
