= List of professional wrestling awards =

Professional wrestling related awards

This is a list of professional wrestling awards.

== List ==
=== Generally recognized ===
Awards	Recognized	For	Years	Ref
Triple Crown	Several promotions around the world	Hold 3 titles in a promotion, usually one world championship, one tag championship and one secondary championship		
Grand Slam	Several promotions around the world	Holding several championships in a promotion		

=== From wrestling companies ===
Awards	Given out by	Categories	Years	Ref
AEW Awards	All Elite Wrestling	Best Moment on the Mic; Biggest Surprise; Breakout Star – Male; Breakout Star – Female; Biggest Beatdown; High Flyer Award; Hardest Moment to Clean Up After; Biggest WTF Moment; LOL Award; Best Twitter Follow; Bleacher Report PPV Moment of the Year	2021–present	
Slammy Award	WWE	Superstar of the Year; Male Superstar of the Year; Diva/Female Superstar of the Year; Tag Team of the Year; Match of the Year; Other various categories	1986–2015; 2020	
WWE Year-End Award	WWE	Male Superstar of the Year; Female Superstar of the Year; Other various categories	2018–2019	
RAW's Gold Medal of Excellence	WWE	N/A	2018	
Warrior Award	WWE	N/A	2015–present	
NXT Year-End Award	WWE	Male Competitor of the Year; Female Competitor of the Year; Tag Team of the Year; TakeOver of the Year; Overall Competitor of the Year; Match of the Year; Breakout of the Year; Rivalry of the Year; Future Star of NXT	2015–present	
Total Nonstop Action Wrestling/ IMPACT Wrestling Year End Awards	Total Nonstop Action Wrestling/ IMPACT Wrestling	Tag Team of the Year; Babe of the Year; Finisher of the Year; Who To Watch in next year; Memorable Moment of the Year; X Division Star of the Year; Match of the Year; Mr. TNA / Wrestler of the Year	2003–2007; 2018–present	

=== Independent organizations ===
Awards	Given out by	Categories	Years	Ref
George Tragos/Lou Thesz Professional; Wrestling Hall of Fame Awards	National Wrestling Hall of Fame and Museum	Frank Gotch Award; James C. Melby Award; Lou Thesz Award; George Tragos Award	2000–present	
Professional Wrestling Hall of Fame Awards	Professional Wrestling Hall of Fame and Museum	New York State Award; Senator Hugh Farley Award	2003–2009	
CAC Awards	Cauliflower Alley Club	Iron Mike Mazurki Award; Art Abrams/Lou Thesz Lifetime Achievement Award; Men's Wrestling Award; Women's Wrestling Award; Tag Team Award; Trainers Award; Charlie Smith Referee's Award; Lucha Libre Award; Posthumous Award; James C. Melby Historian Award: Don Luce; Rising Star Award: Kevin “Killer” Kross	1992–present	
New England Pro Wrestling Hall of Fame Awards	New England Pro Wrestling Fan Fest	Life Time Achievement Award; "New England Icon" Award; Manager of the Year Award; Most Entertaining Personality Award	2010–present	
WWHOF Awards	Women's Wrestling Hall of Fame	Women’s Wrestler of the Year; Most Improved Wrestler of the Year; Broadcaster of the Year; Courage Award; Historian Award; Film/TV Award; Journalism Award	2023–present	

=== Press ===
Awards	Given out by	Categories	Years	Ref
Pro Wrestling Illustrated awards	Pro Wrestling Illustrated	Active; Wrestler of the Year; Tag Team of the Year; Match of the Year; Feud of the Year; Most Popular Wrestler of the Year; Most Hated Wrestler of the Year; Comeback of the Year; Most Improved Wrestler of the Year; Inspirational Wrestler of the Year; Rookie of the Year; Woman of the Year; Lifetime Achievement; Defunct; Midget Wrestler of the Year; Manager of the Year; Announcer of the Year	1972–present	
Wrestling Observer Newsletter awards	Wrestling Observer Newsletter	Active; Wrestler of the Year; Most Outstanding Wrestler; Best Box Office Draw; Feud of the Year; Tag Team of the Year; Most Improved; Best on Interviews; Most Charismatic; Best Technical Wrestler; Best Brawler; Best Flying Wrestler; Most Overrated; Most Underrated; Promotion of the Year; Best Weekly TV Show; Pro Wrestling Match of the Year; Rookie of the Year; Best Non-Wrestler; Best Television Announcer; Worst Television Announcer; Best Major Wrestling Show; Worst Major Wrestling Show; Best Wrestling Maneuver; Most Disgusting Promotional Tactic; Worst Television Show; Worst Match of the Year; Worst Feud of the Year; Worst Promotion of the Year; Best Booker; Promoter of the Year; Best Gimmick; Worst Gimmick; Best Pro Wrestling Book; Best Pro Wrestling Documentary; Defunct; Most Impressive Wrestler; Most Washed Up Wrestler; Strongest Wrestler; Best Three-Man Team; Most Unimproved; Most Obnoxious; Best Babyface; Best Heel; Biggest Shock of the Year; Hardest Worker; Manager of the Year; Best Color Commentator; Readers' Favorite Wrestler; Readers' Least Favorite Wrestler; Worst Wrestler; Worst Tag Team; Worst Manager; Worst on Interviews; Most Embarrassing Wrestler; Worst Non-Wrestling Personality	1980–present	
Tokyo Sports Puroresu Awards	Tokyo Sports	Active; MVP Award; Best Bout Award; Outstanding Performance Award; Fighting Spirit Award; Technique Award; Best Tag Team Award; Newcomer Award; Joshi Puroresu Grand Prize; Special Award; Wrestling Special Award; Defunct; Best Foreigner Award; Best Referee Award; Lifetime Achievement Award; Effort Award; Popularity Award; Service Award; Special Grand Prize; Topic Award	1974–present	
Japan Indie Awards	Fighting TV Samurai	MVP Award; Best Bout Award; Best Show Award; Best Unit Award; Newcomer Award; Special Award; Comeback Award; Lifetime Achievement Award	2007–2023	
Pro Wrestling Torch Year End Awards	Pro Wrestling Torch	Wrestler of the Year; Feud of the Year; Outstanding Wrestler (Best Actual In Ring Wrestler); Rookie of the Year; Match of the Year; Promos of the Year; Tag Team of the Year; Breakout Star of the Year; Diva of the Year; Most Improved; Most Popular; Most Hated; Best Face; Best Heel; Most Controversial; Stable of the Year; Finisher of the Year		
PWInsider.com Year End Awards	Pro Wrestling Insider	Wrestler of the Year; Tag Team of the Year; Match of the Year; Announcer of the Year; Color Commentator of the Year; Hottie of the Year; Feud of the Year; Flyer of the Year; Brawler of the Year; Technician of the Year; Show of the Year; Best Interviews of the Year; Move of the Year; Comeback of the Year; Angle/Storyline of the Year; Character/Gimmick of the Year; Most Improved Wrestler of the Year; Newcomer of the Year; News Story of the Year; Promotion/Brand of the Year; Stupidest Thing About Wrestling This Year; Chant of the Year; DVD of the Year		
Pro Wrestling Report Honors	Pro Wrestling Report	Tag Team Wrestlers of the Year; Female Wrestler of the Year; Shenanigans Moment of the Year; Lifetime Achievement Award; Mark Out Moment of the Year; Wrestler of the Year		
Live Audio Wrestling End of Year Awards	Live Audio Wrestling	Best Wrestler: Male; Best Wrestler: Female; Best Tag Team; Best on the Mic; Best Announcer; Best Non-Wrestling Performer; Most Improved; Best Comeback; Best Gimmick; Match of the Year; Feud of the Year; Best Angle; Best Pay-Per-View; Best Wrestling Pay-Per-View; Best Promotion; Best Television Show; Best Book; Best DVD/Original Programming; Moment of the Year; Best Raw Guest Host; Best LAW Interview; Biggest Story of the Year	2008–2016	
Ontario Indy Wrestling Awards	Ontario Wrestling's Indy Elite (in association with Great Canadian Wrestling)	Eastern Ontario Promotion of the Year; Western Ontario Promotion of the Year; Eastern Ontario Male Wrestler of the Year; Western Ontario Male Wrestler of the Year; Eastern Ontario Female Wrestler of the Year; Western Ontario Female Wrestler of the Year; Eastern Ontario Tag Team of the Year; Western Ontario Tag Team of the Year; Eastern Ontario Male Rookie of the Year; Western Ontario Male Rookie of the Year; Eastern Ontario Female Rookie of the Year; Western Ontario Female Rookie of the Year; Eastern Ontario Manager of the Year; Western Ontario Manager of the Year; Eastern Ontario Show of the Year; Western Ontario Show of the Year; Eastern Ontario Match of the Year; Western Ontario Match of the Year; Eastern Ontario Feud of the Year; Western Ontario Feud of the Year; Eastern Ontario Referee of the Year; Western Ontario Referee of the Year; Eastern Ontario Ring Announcer of the Year; Western Ontario Ring Announcer of the Year; Eastern Ontario Most Popular Male of the Year; Western Ontario Most Popular Male of the Year; Eastern Ontario Most Popular Female of the Year; Western Ontario Most Popular Female of the Year; Eastern Ontario Most Popular Tag Team of the Year; Western Ontario Most Popular Tag Team of the Year; Eastern Ontario Most Hated Male of the Year; Western Ontario Most Hated Male of the Year; Eastern Ontario Most Hated Female of the Year; Western Ontario Most Hated Female of the Year; Eastern Ontario Most Hated Tag Team of the Year; Western Ontario Most Hated Tag Team of the Year; Eastern Ontario Sexiest Man of the Year; Western Ontario Sexiest Man of the Year; Eastern Ontario Sexiest Woman of the Year; Western Ontario Sexiest Woman of the Year; Eastern Ontario Fan of the Year; Western Ontario Fan of the Year		
Power Slam Wrestling Awards	Power Slam	Wrestler of the Year; Babyface of the Year; Heel of the Year; Match of the Year; Card Of The Year; Tag Team; Character of the Year; Most Abysmal Wrestler of the Year		
Southern California Pro-Wrestling Year End Awards	SoCal Uncensored	Promotion of the Year; Wrestler of the Year; Women's Wrestler of the Year; Tag Team of the Year; Most Outstanding Wrestler; Rookie of the Year; Match of the Year		
Year End Pro Wrestling Coverage Awards (Sheety Awards)	Sheet Sandwich	Best Review Site; Best Show Previews; Best Breaking News; Best News Aggregator; Best Opinion/Commentary/Analysis; Best News Reporter; Best Columnist; Best Reviewer; Best Host; Best Co-Host; Best Podcast Network; Best Retro Podcast; Best Show Review Podcast; Best News Podcast; Best Interview Podcast; Writer of the Year; Article of the Year; Story of the Year; Site of the Year; Podcast of the Year		
411 Wrestling Year End Awards	411Mania	Wrestler of the Year; Most Underrated Performer; Most Overrated Wrestler; Best Match; Best Weekly TV Show; Most Outstanding Performer; Best Promotion; Best PPV/Major Show; Best Female Wrestler; Worst Major Show/PPV; Best Tag Team; Biggest Disappointment; Best Non-Wrestler		
Ring Wrestling Awards	Ring Wrestling Magazine	Wrestler of the Year; Tag Team of the Year; Rookie of the Year		
Súper Luchas Premios	Súper Luchas			
Smith Hart Award	PWP Nation (in association with Bruce Hart)	Best Book of the Year	2018–present	
Women's Wrestling Fan Awards	Diva Dirt and Ring the Belle		2018–present	

== See also ==
- List of professional wrestling halls of fame
- Lists of awards
