= Gary Will =

Canadian professional wrestling historian

Gary Will is a Canadian professional wrestling historian and writer.

== Career ==
Will is best known for writing the book Wrestling Title Histories, which is widely regarded as the most complete compilation of championship listings for professional wrestling. Many wrestling fans refer to it as a "Bible". He wrote a listing of deceased professional wrestlers, as noted on various websites. He is also known for his "Canadian Pro Wrestling Page of Fame", which honored professional wrestlers who are Canadian citizens, as opposed to the "Canadian Wrestling Hall of Fame", which honored any wrestler or wrestling associated person who made landmark contributions for wrestling in Canada.

== Works ==
- Will, Gary; Duncan, Royal (1994). Wrestling Title Histories. Pennsylvania State University. p. 445. ISBN 978-0969816157.
- Will, Gary; Duncan, Royal; Macika, Dominic (1996). Wrestling Real Names & Aliases. Archeus Communications. p. 127. ISBN 9780969816140.
- Will, Gary (1996). How to Prepare for an Employment Interview: A Step-by-Step Guide to Researching the Company, Analyzing the Position, Knowing Your Strengths and Presenting Them Persuasively. Archeus Communications. p. 85. ISBN 9780969816126.

== See also ==
- List of professional wrestling halls of fame
- List of professional wrestling magazines
