= The Buffalo Invasion =

1997 Extreme Championship Wrestling live event

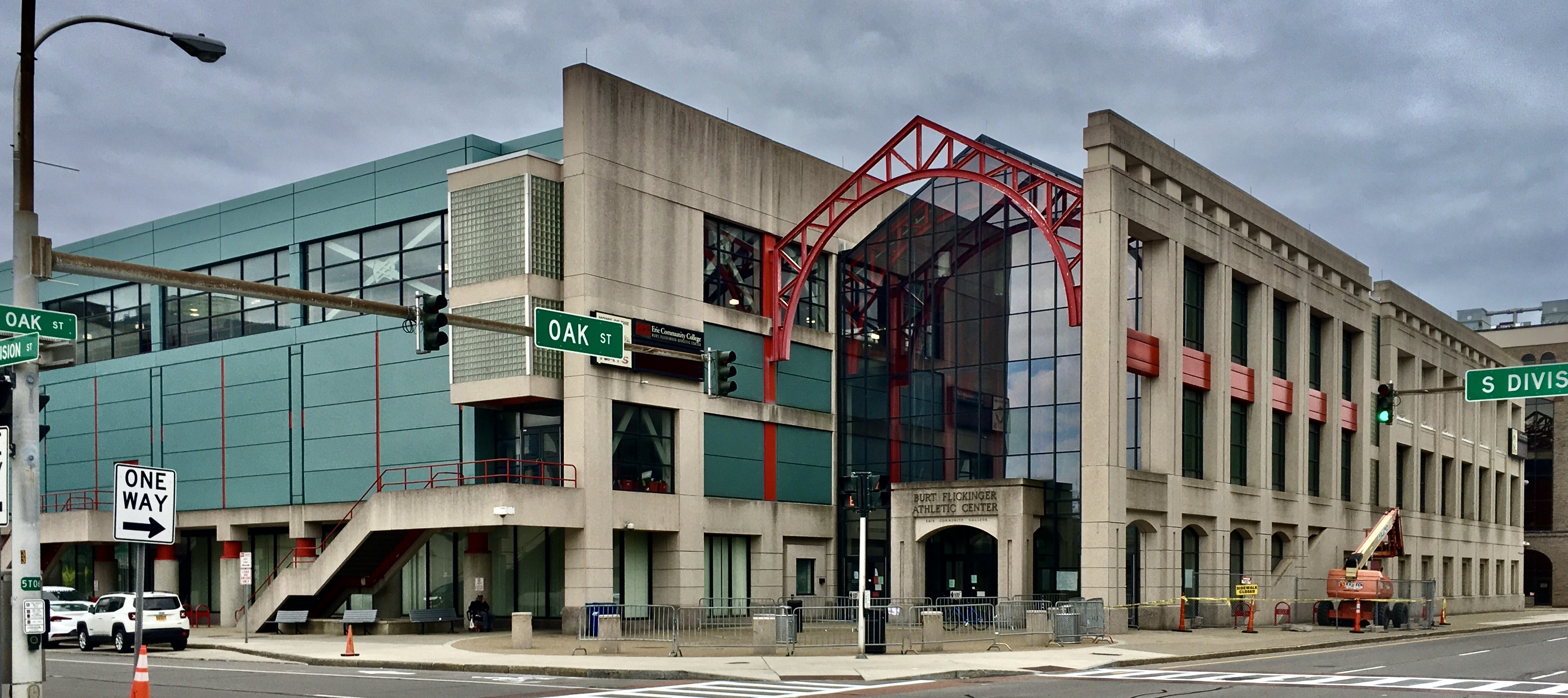
- The Burt Flickinger Center in Buffalo, New York.
- Promotion: Extreme Championship Wrestling
- Date: May 17, 1997 (aired May 22, 1997)
- City: Buffalo, New York, US
- Venue: Burt Flickinger Center
- Attendance: 1,697

Event chronology
← Previous; Chapter 2	Next → Wrestlepalooza

The Buffalo Invasion was a professional wrestling live event produced by Extreme Championship Wrestling (ECW) on May 17, 1997. The event was held in the Burt Flickinger Center in Buffalo, New York in the United States. Excerpts from The Buffalo Invasion aired on episode #213 of the syndicated television show ECW Hardcore TV on May 22, 1997, while the event was released on VHS and DVD. Both the main event and the bout between the Dudley Brothers, the Eliminators, and the Gangstas were included on the compilation DVD ECW: Unreleased Vol. 2 released by WWE in 2013.

== Event ==
The Buffalo Invasion was attended by 1,697 people. The announcer for the event was Joey Styles, with guest color commentary from Rick Rude.

The opening bout was a tag team match between the Full Blooded Italians and the Pitbulls. The Pitbulls won by after they delivered an superbomb to Little Guido, enabling Pitbull #2 to pin him.

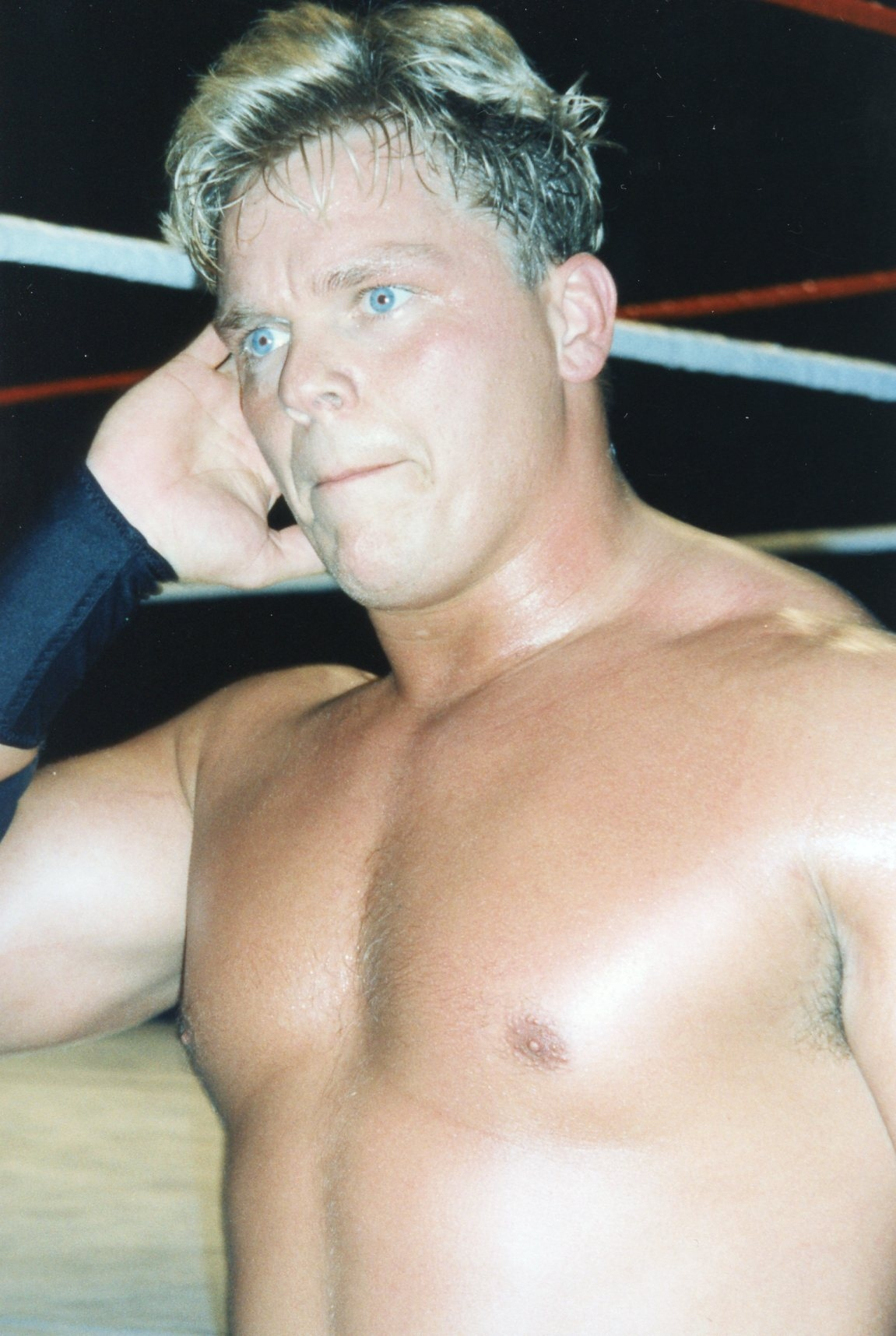
Shane Douglas retained the ECW World Television Championship at The Buffalo Invasion.

The second bout was a singles match between Balls Mahoney and Bill Wiles. Mahoney defeated Wiles by pinfall following a chair shot.

The third bout was a singles match between Spike Dudley and Taz. Taz defeated Dudley by submission using the Tazmission.

The fourth bout saw ECW World Television Champion Shane Douglas defend his title against Chris Chetti. After Douglas' valet Francine repeatedly interfered on his behalf, Douglas' rival Rick Rude came to the ring and carried her backstage. Douglas went on to defeat Chetti by pinfall following a belly-to-belly suplex.

In a continuation of the length feud between Raven and Tommy Dreamer, the fifth bout was a "dream partners" tag team match, with Raven picking his former henchman Stevie Richards as his partner and Dreamer picking Terry Funk as his. Raven and Richards, whose relationship had deteriorated in the months leading up to the event, argued with one another throughout the match. Towards the end of the match, a pin attempt on Raven by Dreamer was thwarted by interference from Louie Spicolli, resulting in Dreamer fighting Raven to backstage. As Spicolli attempted to give Funk a Death Valley Driver, Richards gave him a Stevie Kick, knocking both men down and enabling Richards to pin Funk.

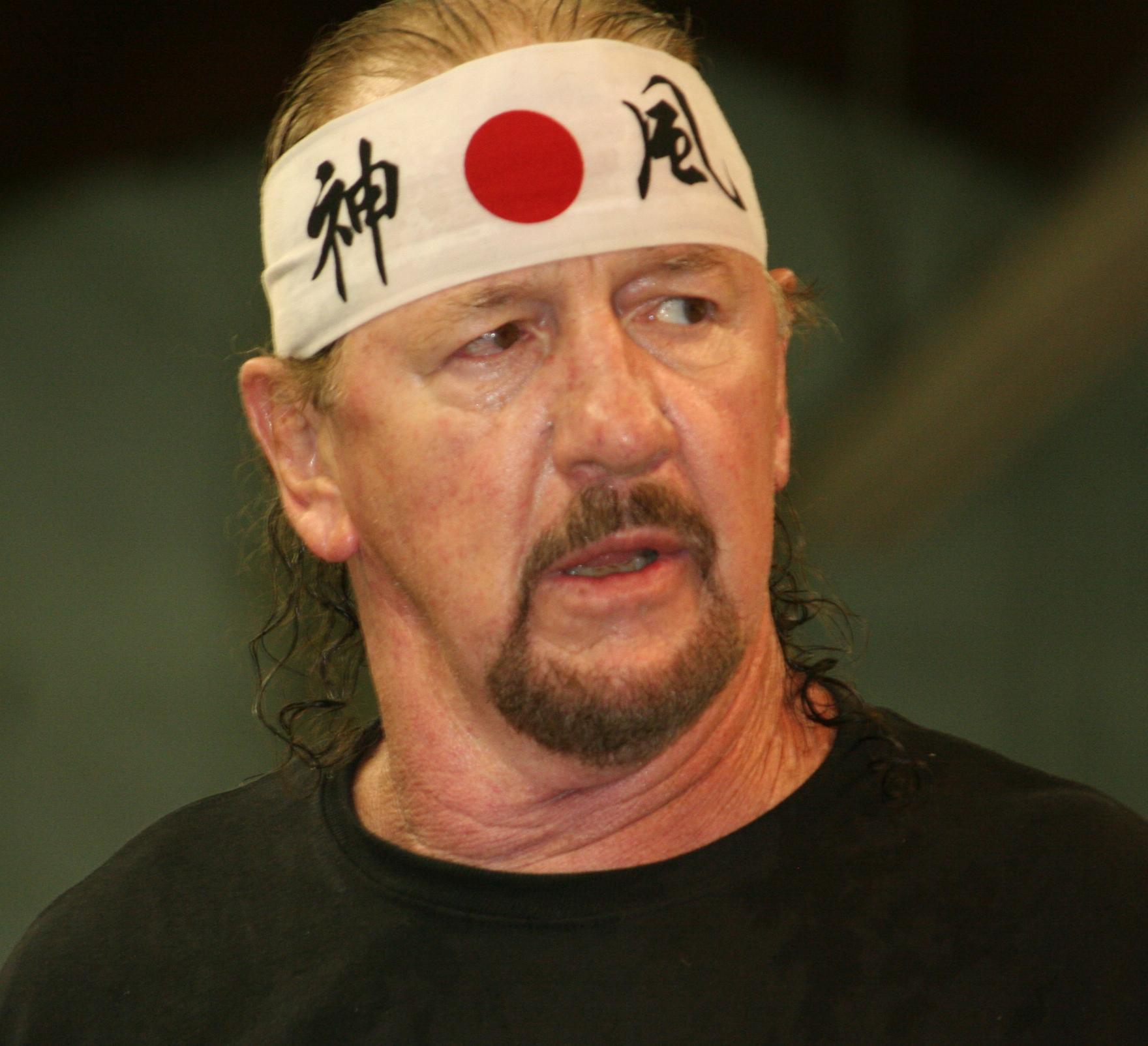
Terry Funk retained the ECW World Heavyweight Championship in the main event of The Buffalo Invasion.

The sixth bout saw ECW World Tag Team Champions the Eliminators defend their titles against the Dudley Brothers and the Gangstas in a three-way tag team elimination match. D-Von Dudley teamed with Big Dick Dudley, who was substituting for Buh Buh Ray Dudley who had sustained a broken ankle at Barely Legal. The Gangstas missed the beginning of the match, with the Dudley Brothers fighting the Eliminators for several minutes before they joined the match. The Eliminators won the match after performing Total Elimination on Big Dick Dudley and Mustafa simultaneously, enabling them to pin both men and eliminate both other teams.

The penultimate bout was a singles match between Louie Spicolli and Tommy Dreamer. Before the match, Spicolli boasted that Dreamer would be unable to compete due to his interference in the earlier match, only for Dreamer to come to the ring. During the match, the two men fought into the bleachers of the Burt Flickinger Center, resulting in Dreamer rolling down them. Towards the end of the match, Spicolli pulled Dreamer's valet Beulah McGillicutty (who was wearing a neck brace after having received a Death Valley Driver from Spicolli at Chapter 2) in front of him to block a chair shot from Dreamer, only for McGillicutty to give him a low blow, enabling Dreamer to give Spicolli a DDT and then pin him.

The main event of the Buffalo Invasion saw ECW World Heavyweight Champion Funk defend his title against Raven, the Sandman, and Stevie Richards in a four way dance in a rematch from Chapter 2. Raven was the first man eliminated, with Funk pinning him following a Stevie Kick from Richards. Richards went on to eliminate The Sandman with another Stevie Kick. Funk then threw a guard rail at Richards, knocking him down and enabling him to pin him. Richards suffered a legitimate severe injury from the guard rail hitting him in the neck which almost forced him to retire.

== Results ==
No.	Results	Stipulations	Times
1	The Pitbulls (Pitbull #1 and Pitbull #2) defeated the Full Blooded Italians (Little Guido and Tracy Smothers) (with Tommy Rich) by pinfall	Tag team match	13:23
2	Balls Mahoney defeated Bill Wiles by pinfall	Singles match	4:49
3	Taz defeated Spike Dudley by submission	Singles match	5:52
4	Shane Douglas (with Francine) (c) defeated Chris Chetti by pinfall	Singles match for the ECW World Television Championship	—
5	Raven (with Chastity and Lupus) and Stevie Richards defeated Terry Funk and Tommy Dreamer (with Beulah McGillicutty) by pinfall	"Dream partner" tag team match	16:18
6	The Eliminators (John Kronus and Perry Saturn) (c) defeated the Dudley Brothers (Big Dick Dudley and D-Von Dudley) (with Buh Buh Ray Dudley and Joel Gertner) and the Gangstas (Mustafa and New Jack) by pinfall	Three-way tag team elimination match for the ECW World Tag Team Championship	17:54
7	Tommy Dreamer (with Beulah McGillicutty) defeated Louie Spicolli by pinfall	Singles match	7:38
8	Terry Funk (c) defeated Raven (with Chastity and Lupus), the Sandman, and Stevie Richards by pinfall	Four way dance for the ECW World Heavyweight Championship	16:28
(c) / – the champion(s) heading into the match
