= SoCal Uncensored (website) =

Professional wrestling magazine

- Editor: Jason Caley; Steve Bryant
- Categories: Professional wrestling
- Founded: 2001
- Country: US
- Language: English
- Website: http://socaluncensored.com/

SoCalUncensored.com is a professional wrestling news website based in Southern California. It is owned by Steven Bryant and was created in 2001. The site aggregates local wrestling and MMA events and a number of wrestlers such as Samoa Joe and Jake Atlas have contributed to the site over the years. The popularity of the site led Christopher Daniels, Frankie Kazarian, and Scorpio Sky to name their professional wrestling stable as "SoCal Uncensored" in homage to it.

== Pro Wrestling Stable ==
At Ring of Honor's Final Battle, Scorpio Sky joined Christopher Daniels and Frankie Kazarian, becoming known as SoCal Uncensored. They chose the name SoCal Uncensored in homage to the website, which all three were fans of. Before using the name they asked for and were granted permission from the website to use the name.

== Legal threats from Lucha Underground ==
In March 2018, Lucha Underground's parent company, FactoryMade Ventures (FMV), sent a cease and desist to Steven Bryant of SoCalUncensored.com and Ryan Satin of ProWrestlingSheet.com for publishing spoilers to recent Lucha Underground tapings. SoCalUncensored.com continued to post spoilers for Lucha Underground and no further legal action was taken.

== Awards ==
SoCalUncensored.com has given annual professional wrestling awards in several categories since 2001. The awards have been referenced on Ring of Honor, Impact Wrestling, AEW television, and featured on Spectrum News.

== Hall of Fame ==
SoCalUncensored.com currently hosts the Southern California Pro-Wrestling Hall of Fame, which was created in 2001 by wrestlers Cincinnati Red, Jason "Primetime" Peterson and Steven Bryant.
