= Tinieblas =

Mexican luchador (born 1939)

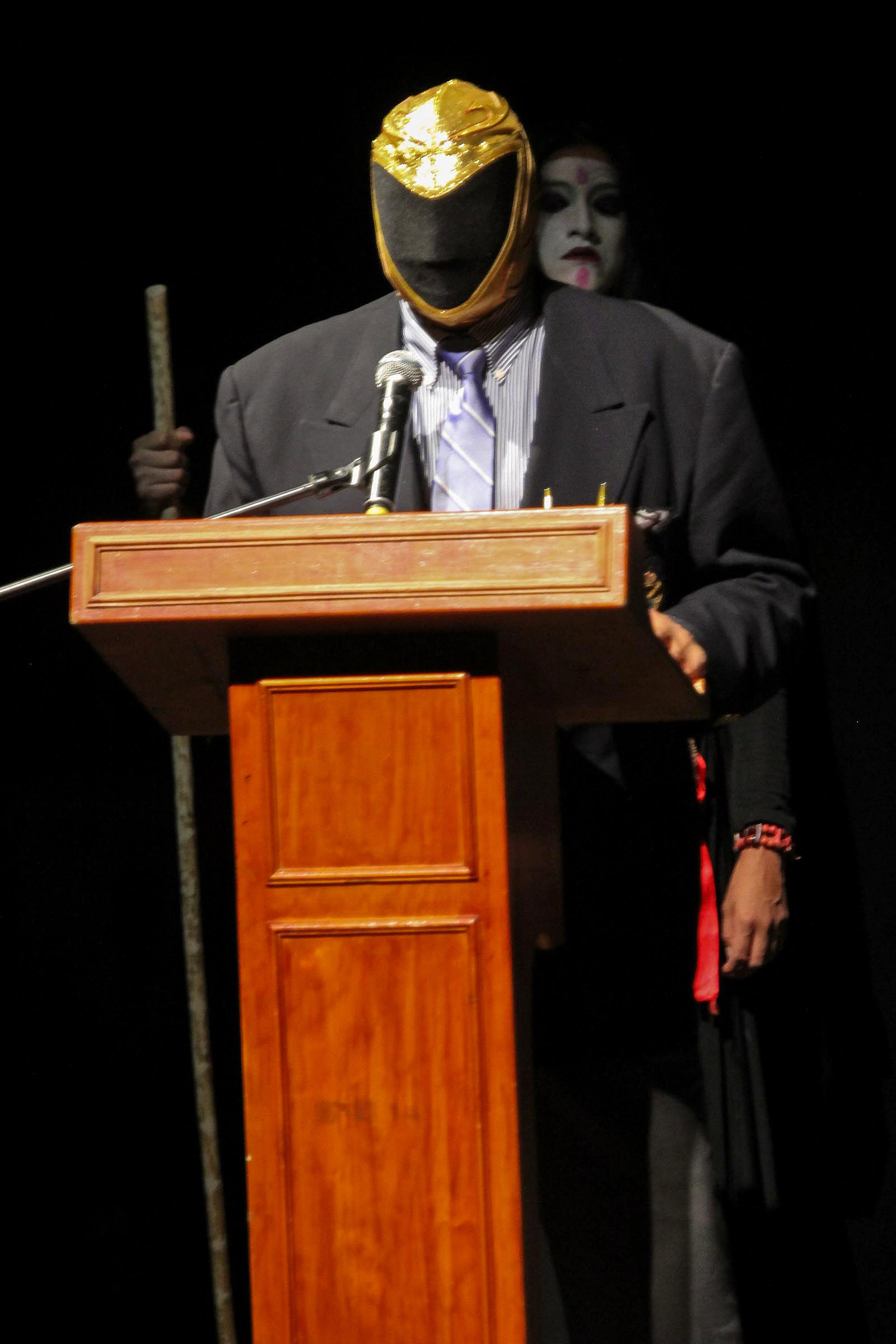

Personal information
- Born: Manuel Leal; June 8, 1939 (age 87) Mexico City, Mexico

Professional wrestling career
- Ring name(s): Tinieblas el Gigante
- Billed height: 1.90 m (6 ft 3 in)
- Billed weight: 109 kg (240 lb)
- Trained by: Rafael Salamanca; Dick Medrano
- Debut: August 20, 1971
- Retired: August 18, 2019

Manuel Leal (born June 8, 1939), better known as Tinieblas ("Darkness"), is a Mexican professional wrestler and actor.

== Professional wrestling career ==
Tinieblas began as a body builder and stunt man who was spotted by professional wrestler Black Shadow and Dory Dixon. Impressed by Leal's physique they convinced him to begin a career as a professional wrestler. In 1968, "Lucha Libre" magazine editor Valente Pérez, came up with the idea of a character that would act as a rival for professional wrestler Mil Mascaras. He created a character with a faceless hood and named him "Tinieblas" (Darkness). Perez selected the former body builder turned wrestler to wrestle as that character. Tinieblas debuted as a face on August 20, 1971. He would become a large draw in Mexico and toured internationally. Tinieblas was also one of the first wrestlers to tour Japan in 1974. He wrestled at 80 years old on August 18, 2019.

== Comic series ==
Tinieblas was the second Mexican professional wrestler (after El Santo) to have a comic book series based on his character. His first comic book was printed between 1976 and 1979. In 1991, a second series titled, "Tinieblas, El Hijo de la Noche" (Tinieblas, Son of the Night) was created. It was printed until 1995. The Tinieblas comic series was relaunched in the year 2000.

== Film career ==
Tinieblas also made appearances in luchador films. In 1971, he starred as a member of a squadron of masked superheroes in the film '"Los Campeones Justicieros"' (The Champions of Justice). Membership in the Champions of Justice included such legendary Mexican professional wrestling figures as Mil Mascaras, Blue Demon, El Rayo de Jalisco Sr., El Medico Asesino, El Fantasma Blanco and Superzan. He guest-starred in many low-budget foreign series, such as Vendetta and Rederiet.

== Legacy ==
Tinieblas debuted at a relatively old age of 32, so he never reached the same physical peak as many other popular professional wrestlers of his generation. However, his character remains popular with young professional wrestling fans, primarily due to his appearance in comic books and films. Tinieblas still wrestles occasionally and has appeared alongside his son Tinieblas Jr.

== Videogames ==
The 2D wrestling arcade game Saturday Night Slam Masters released by Japanese game company Capcom in 1993 featured a final boss character called "El Escorpión" (The Scorpion), whose appearance was inspired by Tinieblas. The character's name in the original Japanese edition of the game was "The Astro" (アストロ, Asutoro).

== Filmography ==
- Los Campeones justicieros (The Champions of Justice) (1971) (credited)
- Superzan el invencible (Superzan the Invincible) (1971)
- Una rosa sobre el ring (A Rose in the Ring) (1973) co-starring Mil Mascaras
- El Castillo de las momias de Guanajuato (The Castle of the Mummies of Guanajuato) (1973)
- Leyendas macabras de la colonia (Macabre Legends of the Colony) (1974) (co-starring Mil Mascaras)
- Las Momias de San Ángel (The Mummies of San Angel) (1975)
- El Investigador Capulina (Investigator Capulina) (1975)
- El Puño de la muerte (Santo in "Fist of Death") (1982) co-starring Santo
- La Furia de las karatecas (Santo in "Fury of the Karate Experts") (1982) co-starring Santo

== Championships and accomplishments ==
- World Wrestling Association
  - WWA World Heavyweight Championship (1 time)

== Lucha de Apuesta record ==
Winner (wager)	Loser (wager)	Location	Event	Date	Notes
Tinieblas (mask)	El Internacional (mask)	Torreón Coahuila	Live event	N/A	
Tinieblas (mask)	TNT (hair)	Mexico City	Live event	July 24, 1973	
Tinieblas (mask)	Red Terror (mask)	N/AUnknown	Live event	April 24, 1982	
Tinieblas (mask)	Super Máquina (hair)	Mexico City	Live event	November 13, 1983	
Tinieblas (mask)	Bill Anderson (hair)	Los Angeles, California	Live event	1987	
Tinieblas (mask)	Abdullah Tamba (hair)	Los Angeles, California	Live event	1987	
Tinieblas (mask)	Médico Asesino Jr. (mask)	Torreón, Coahuila	Live event	April 4, 1999	
Tinieblas (mask)	El Enfermero 2001 (mask)	Ciudad Juárez, Chihuahua	Live event	January 21, 2001	(Note: Relevos Suicidas against Máscara Sagrada and Fishman Jr.)
Tinieblas (mask)	Zombie II (mask)	Ensenada, Baja California	Live event	January 24, 2003	(Note: finals of a 12 wrestler Ruleta Rusa)
