= WWA Trios Championship =

Professional wrestling trios tag team championship

WWA World Trios Championship (Campeonato Mundial de Trios WWA)

Details
- Promotion: World Wrestling Association (WWA)
- Date established: 1989 (abandoned between 1998 and 2013)
- Current champion(s): Trio Fantasia (Super Muñeco, Super Pinocho and Super Raton)
- Date won: December 14, 2013
Statistics
- First champion(s): Zandokan, Khaos I and Sicodelico

The WWA World Trios Championship (Campeonato Mundial de Trios WWA in Spanish) is a six-man (or trios) Tag Team Championship in the Mexican lucha libre (Professional wrestling) promotion World Wrestling Association (WWA) in Mexico. It was first won by Zandokan, Khaos I and Sicodelico around 1989 and was defended throughout Mexico until it was abandoned in 1998.

As it was a professional wrestling championship, the championship was not won not by actual competition, but by a scripted ending to a match determined by the bookers and match makers. (Note: Hornbaker (2016) p. 550: "Professional wrestling is a sport in which match finishes are predetermined. Thus, win–loss records are not indicative of a wrestler's genuine success based on their legitimate abilities – but on now much, or how little they were pushed by promoters") On occasion the promotion declares a championship vacant, which means there is no champion at that point in time. This can either be due to a storyline, (Note: Duncan & Will (2000) p. 271, Chapter: Texas: NWA American Tag Team Title [World Class, Adkisson] "Championship held up and rematch ordered because of the interference of manager Gary Hart") or real life issues such as a champion suffering an injury being unable to defend the championship, (Note: Duncan & Will (2000) p. 20, Chapter: (United States: 19th Century & widely defended titles – NWA, WWF, AWA, IW, ECW, NWA) NWA/WCW TV Title "Rhodes stripped on 85/10/19 for not defending the belt after having his leg broken by Ric Flair and Ole & Arn Anderson") or leaving the company. (Note: Duncan & Will (2000) p. 201, Chapter: (Memphis, Nashville) Memphis: USWA Tag Team Title "Vacant on 93/01/18 when Spike leaves the USWA.")

== Title history ==
Key
No.	Overall reign number
Reign	Reign number for the specific champion
Days	Number of days held
N/A	Unknown information
†	Championship change is unrecognized by the promotion
+	Current reign is changing daily

No.	Champion	Championship change			Reign statistics		Notes	Ref.
No.	Champion	Date	Event	Location	Reign	Days	Notes	Ref.
1	Zandokan, Khaos and Sicódelico	1989	Live event	(Note: The location of the championship change has not been captured as part of the documentation.)	1	(Note: The exact date on which the team won the title is not known, placing their title reign between 1 and 118 days.)		(Note: Duncan & Will (2000) p. 401, Chapter: "Mexico: World Wrestling Association (Benjamin Mora) WWA Trios Title")
2	The American Mercenaries (Bill Anderson, Louie Spicolli and Tim Patterson)	April 29, 1989	Live event	Tijuana, Mexico	1	(Note: The exact date on which the team lost the title is unknown, placing their title reign between 1 and 89 days.)		
Championship history is unrecorded from April 29, 1989 to May 1989.
3	Los Guerreros (Chavo, Mando and Eddy Guerrero)	May 1989	Live event		1	(Note: The exact date on which the team won the title is unknown, placing their title reign between 1 and 89 days.)		
4	The American Mercinaries (Bill Anderson, Louie Spicolli and Tim Patterson)	July 28, 1989	Live event	Tijuana, Mexico	2	875		
5	Kiss, Ultraman 2000 and Aguila de Americano	December 20, 1991	Live event	Tijuana, Mexico	1			
Championship history is unrecorded from December 20, 1991 to April 30, 1995.
6	Fuerza Guerrera, Juventud Guerrera and Psicosis	April 30, 1995	Live event	Tonala, Mexico	1	(Note: The exact date on which the title was vacated is unknown, placing their title reign between 124 and 153 days.)	Defeated El Hijo del Santo, Octagon and Rey Misterio Jr.	
—	Vacated	September 1995	—	—	—	—	Championship vacated when the team left promotion	
7	Kiss, Ultraman 2000 and Aguila de Americano	November 1995	Live event	N/A	2			
Championship history is unrecorded from November 1995 to June 1998.
—	Vacated	June 1998	—	—	—	—	Championship vacated due to inactivity of previous champions	
8	Los Brazos (Brazo de Oro, Brazo de Plata and El Brazo)	June 12, 1998	Live event	Tijuana, Mexico	1	(Note: The exact date on which the team vacated the title is unknown, placing their title reign between 1 and 202 days.)	Defeated Los Villanos (Villano III, IV and V) to win the vacant title.	
—	Deactivated	1998	—	—	—	—	Championship inactive as Los Brazos stopped teaming on a regular basis.	
9	El Trío Fantasma (Super Muñeco, Super Pinocho and Super Raton)	September 1, 2013	El Adios de Enrique Vera	Tlalnepantla de Baz, State of Mexico	1	427	Defeated Black Terry, Scorpio Jr. and Shu El Guerrero to win the vacant title.	
10	La Secta Negra (Carta Brava Jr., Cerebro Negro and Fantasma de la Opera)	July 14, 2013	IWL 3 Aniversario	Tlalnepantla de Baz, State of Mexico	1	91		
11	El Trío Fantasma (Super Muñeco, Super Pinocho and Super Raton)	December 14, 2013	House show	Tampico, Tamaulipas	1	4,121+		
