= ECW Chapter 2 =

1997 Extreme Championship Wrestling live event

Chapter 2
- The ECW Arena
- Promotion: Extreme Championship Wrestling
- Date: May 10, 1997 (aired May 15, 1997)
- City: Philadelphia, Pennsylvania, US
- Venue: ECW Arena
- Attendance: c.1,100

Event chronology
← Previous; Hostile City Showdown	Next → The Buffalo Invasion

Chapter 2 was a professional wrestling live event produced by Extreme Championship Wrestling (ECW) on May 10, 1997. The event was held in the ECW Arena in Philadelphia, Pennsylvania in the United States. Excerpts from Chapter 2 aired on episode #212 of the syndicated television show ECW Hardcore TV on May 15, 1997.

== Event ==
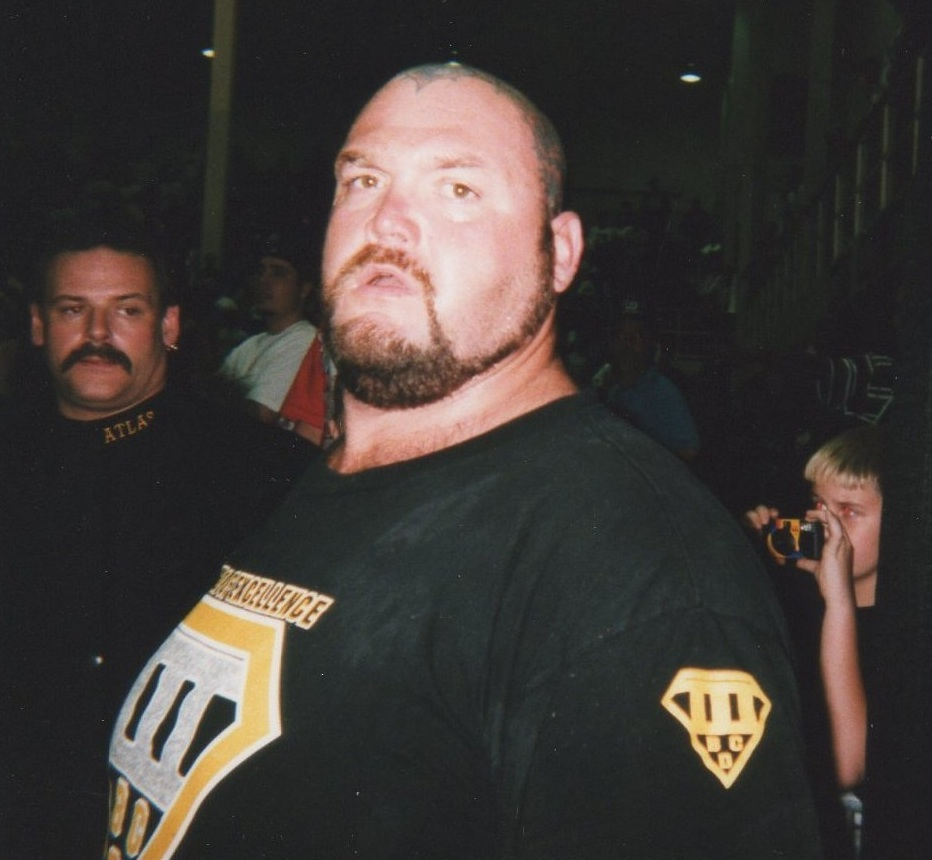
Bam Bam Bigelow returned to ECW at Chapter 2, joining the Triple Threat.

The event was attended by approximately 1,100 people. The commentators for the event were Joey Styles and Rick Rude.

The opening bout was a tag team match pitting Bam Bam Bigelow and Shane Douglas against the Pitbulls. Bigelow, who was making his return to ECW after being absent since October 1996, was introduced as the new member of the Triple Threat alongside Douglas, Chris Candido, and Francine. During the match, Rick Rude came to the ring and carried Francine backstage in a suggestive manner. Bigelow and Douglas won the bout when Douglas pinned Pitbull #2 after a kick from Bigelow.

The second bout was a singles match between Axl Rotten and Chris Chetti. Rotten won the bout by pinfall.

The third bout was a tag team match pitting Spike Dudley and Balls Mahoney (substituting for Mikey Whipwreck, who injured his knee during the match) against the Full Blooded Italians. The Full Blooded Italians won the match by pinfall.

The fourth bout saw ECW World Tag Team Champions the Eliminators defend their title against PG-13. The Eliminators won the bout when Saturn pinned Wolfie D following Total Elimination.

The fifth bout was a singles match between Louie Spicolli and Tommy Dreamer. At the outset of the match, Spicolli wore a cast on his hand due to Dreamer having broken his fingers; after Spicolli hit Dreamer with the cast, he removed it, revealing it to have been loaded. Dreamer won the bout by pinfall following an enziguri. After the match, Spicolli attacked Dreamer then gave Dreamer's valet Beulah McGillicutty a Spicolli Driver, causing her to be taken out of the ring in a stretcher.

The sixth bout was a tag team match pitting the Dudley Brothers against the Gangstas. The Dudley Brothers won the bout by pinfall following a 3D.

The seventh match saw Rob Van Dam and Chris Candido face one another in a "mystery partners" tag team match, with Van Dam selecting Sabu as his partner and Candido selecting Taz. Candido and Taz won the bout when Candido pinned Van Dam using a bridging German suplex.

The main event saw ECW World Heavyweight Champion Terry Funk defend his title against Raven, the Sandman, and Stevie Richards in a four way dance. Raven was the first man eliminated when he was pinned by The Sandman, then Funk and Richards both pinned The Sandman. Funk went on to win the match by pinning Richards.

== Results ==
No.	Results	Stipulations
1	Bam Bam Bigelow and Shane Douglas (with Francine) defeated the Pitbulls (Pitbull #1 and Pitbull #2) by pinfall	Tag team match
2	Axl Rotten defeated Chris Chetti by pinfall	Singles match
3	The Full Blooded Italians (Little Guido and Tracy Smothers) defeated Balls Mahoney and Spike Dudley by pinfall	Tag team match
4	The Eliminators (Kronus and Saturn) (c) defeated PG-13 (J. C. Ice and Wolfie D) by pinfall	Tag team match for the ECW World Tag Team Championship
5	Tommy Dreamer (with Beulah McGillicutty) defeated Louie Spicolli by pinfall	Singles match
6	The Dudley Brothers (Big Dick Dudley and D-Von Dudley) defeated the Gangstas (Mustafa and New Jack)	Tag team match
7	Chris Candido and Taz defeated Rob Van Dam and Sabu (with Bill Alfonso) by pinfall	Tag team match
8	Terry Funk (c) defeated Raven, the Sandman, and Stevie Richards by pinfall	Four way dance for the ECW World Heavyweight Championship
(c) / – the champion(s) heading into the match
