= Louie Spicolli =

American professional wrestler (1971–1998)

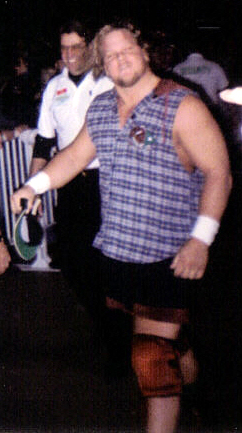
- Spicolli as "Rad Radford" in 1995

Personal information
- Born: Louis Mucciolo Jr. February 10, 1971 San Pedro, Los Angeles, California, U.S.
- Died: February 15, 1998 (aged 27) Los Angeles, California, U.S.
- Cause of death: Asphyxia due to pulmonary aspiration as a result of an alcohol and prescription drug overdose

Professional wrestling career
- Ring name(s): Body Snatcher; Cutie Pie; Killer Blond; Louie Spicolli; Madonna's Boyfriend; Mercenario III; Rad Radford; The Zodiac
- Billed height: 5 ft 11 in (180 cm)
- Billed weight: 264 lb (120 kg)
- Billed from: San Pedro, California; Seattle, Washington (as Rad Radford)
- Trained by: Bill Anderson
- Debut: 1988

Louis Mucciolo Jr. (February 10, 1971 – February 15, 1998) was an American professional wrestler. He performed in Mexico under the ring name Madonna's Boyfriend, for the World Wrestling Federation as Rad Radford, and in Extreme Championship Wrestling and World Championship Wrestling in the 1990s as Louie Spicolli. He is sometimes credited as being the inventor of the Death Valley driver finisher and even wore T-shirts in WCW stating it, though some say it was created by Japanese female wrestler Etsuko Mita.

== Professional wrestling career ==
=== Early career (1988–1995) ===
At the age of 17, Mucciolo began training with "Big" Bill Anderson after the two met at a wrestling show held at the Los Angeles Memorial Sports Arena. He debuted in 1988 aged 17, working as a jobber for the World Wrestling Federation, using the ring name Louie Spicolli and would continue to use this name in squash matches until March 1995. His occasional appearances saw him lose to many of the WWF's top stars, though he did register two victories in 1993, defeating the White Knight (actually his trainer, Bill Anderson) and The Lightning Kid. He also picked up a victory on March 13, 1995 over Greg Davis, his last appearance before being repackaged.

In 1989, he traveled to Tijuana in Mexico with Tim Patterson and his trainer, Bill Anderson, with whom he formed a stable known as "Los Mercenarios Americanos" ("The American Mercenaries"). They were a trio of masked villains who feuded with Los Villanos (Villano I, Villano III, Villano IV, and Villano V). The Mercenarios were forced to unmask in July 1991 and then disbanded in 1992.

Spicolli worked on the independent circuit, appearing with Herb Abrams' Universal Wrestling Federation as "Cutie Pie". He traveled to Arizona in 1991, where he won the Interwest Wrestling Federation Heavyweight Championship as "The Zodiac". After several appearances in the WWF as an enhancement talent in 1992, Spicolli returned to Mexico as "The Killer Blonde" and made several appearances with Frontier Martial-Arts Wrestling in Japan, before getting fired by Atsushi Onita for throwing a bottle of urine out the bus window. In 1994, Spicolli appeared briefly with Smoky Mountain Wrestling, feuding with Chris Candido for the SMW United States Junior Heavyweight Championship. He left shortly afterward and joined Asistencia Asesoría y Administración as "Madonna's Boyfriend", one of Los Gringos Locos along with Eddie Guerrero, Konnan, and Art Barr. He wrestled in a six-man tag team match at When Worlds Collide on November 6, 1994, which, as of 2016, was the only pay-per-view that AAA has held in the United States. This exposure led to Spicolli being offered jobs by many promotions.

=== World Wrestling Federation (1995–1996) ===
In April 1995, the WWF repackaged Spicolli as "Rad Radford", a fan of grunge, and purportedly the boyfriend of Courtney Love. He worked an angle with the Bodydonnas, wanting to join (despite his comparatively flabby body) and was eventually admitted as a "Bodydonna-in-training". This lasted until Survivor Series, when he was thrown out of the group because his physique was not good enough. Spicolli achieved little success as Radford, rarely getting victories over other name talent.

Spicolli wrestled his final match for the WWF at a house show in New Haven, Connecticut on January 6, 1996. After coming home from the house show tour, Spicolli was found unconscious by a neighbor when he overdosed on Soma and suffered a seizure. He was in intensive care for several days before making a recovery. The WWF, still mindful of the controversy and negative impacts from the steroid trial in 1994, released Spicolli on the condition that he would not work for the rival WCW promotion for a year.

=== Extreme Championship Wrestling (1996–1997) ===
Spicolli struggled with depression before joining Extreme Championship Wrestling in July 1996 as a face.

Spicolli later turned heel and feuded with Tommy Dreamer. At Chapter 2 in May 1997, Spicolli gave Dreamer's valet Beulah McGillicutty a Spicolli Driver, causing her to be taken out of the ring in a stretcher. Their feud ended in July 1997, when Dreamer defeated Spicolli in an "I quit" match.

Spicolli wrestled his final match for ECW at Born to Be Wired in August 1997, losing to Mikey Whipwreck.

Spicolli left ECW on bad terms after owner Paul Heyman discovered that he had been covertly negotiating with both WCW and WWF. Moreover, Spicolli's continued drug abuse was seen as an embarrassment to the company.

Spicolli was a mainstay of the Empire Wrestling Federation for the company's first two years of existence. He performed there as a favor to his trainer Bill Anderson, who at the time was co-owner of the company.

=== World Championship Wrestling (1997–1998) ===
Spicolli signed with WCW in late 1997 and became the lackey of his friend, New World Order member Scott Hall, dubbing himself "The Real Innovator" in order to mock Tommy Dreamer (known by the nickname "The Innovator of Violence"). Spicolli later began commentating during matches, and impressed many with his wit, though he was admonished after making a joke concerning the Oklahoma City bombing after commentator Tony Schiavone referred to a forthcoming "bombshell". Eric Bischoff reportedly saw Spicolli as "The Chris Farley of Wrestling." Hall and Spicolli soon feuded with Larry Zbyszko, with Spicolli stealing Zbyszko's golf clubs, bringing them to the ring, and breaking them over his knee while Hall made sarcastic comments on the mic. This resulted in a match between Spicolli and Zbyszko being booked for SuperBrawl VIII on February 22, 1998. However, the match never took place due to Spicolli's death one week before the match. His last match was on February 9, 1998 episode of WCW Monday Nitro losing to Chris Adams by disqualification.

== Death ==
Spicolli had stopped taking drugs after renewed fears for his health, but the news that his mother was terminally ill with cancer led to a relapse. Spicolli died on February 15, 1998, five days after his 27th birthday, after overdosing on Soma and wine, choking on his own vomit in his sleep. Investigators found an empty vial of testosterone, unspecified analgesia and medication for the management of anxiety. The Los Angeles County coroner's office determined the drugs might have contributed to his heart condition.

== Championships and accomplishments ==
- American Wrestling Federation
  - AWF Heavyweight Championship (1 time)
- Interwest Wrestling Federation
  - IWF Heavyweight Championship (1 time)
- Pro Wrestling Illustrated
  - Ranked No. 165 of the top 500 singles wrestlers in the PWI 500 in 1997
- Southern California Pro-Wrestling Hall of Fame
  - Inducted 2001
- World Wrestling Association
  - WWA World Trios Championship (2 times) – with Bill Anderson and Tim Patterson

== See also ==
- List of premature professional wrestling deaths
