= Southern California Pro-Wrestling Hall of Fame =

Professional wrestling hall of fame

- Established: 2001

The Southern California Pro-Wrestling Hall of Fame was created in 2001 by wrestlers Cincinnati Red, Jason "Primetime" Peterson and Steven Bryant, it was dedicated in the memory of Louie Spicolli. The Hall of Fame was created with the mission to preserve and promote the history of professional wrestling in Southern California. It is currently hosted on the SoCal Uncensored website.

== History ==
The 2010 induction ceremony took place at Mach 1 Wrestling's Hall of Fame Cup. Disco Machine and TARO accepted the award for Super Dragon who could not be there, and Joey Munoz accepted the award for Dynamite D who died in 2007. Voting for the 2016 inductions took place in February 2016. The 2017 induction ceremony took place on September 22, 2017 at a Santino Bros. Wrestling Academy event in Downey, CA. The 2020 inductions were announced on April 10, 2020 but no induction ceremony was held due to the COVID-19 pandemic.

== Inductees ==
2001

- Freddie Blassie
- Chavo Guerrero Sr.
- Roddy Piper
- Louie Spicoli

2002

- “The Destroyer” Dick Beyer
- Johnny “Red Shoes” Duggan
- Gorgeous George
- Dick Lane
- Ed “Strangler” Lewis
- Mil Mascaras

2003

- Mando Guerrero
- Gene LeBell
- Lou Thesz
- John Tolos

2004

- Great Goliath
- Mike LeBell
- Jimmy Lennon Sr.
- Baron Michele Leone
- Jim Londos
- Ray Mendoza

2005

- Black Gordman
- Hijo del Santo
- Lou Daro

2006

- Jesse Hernandez
- Doink the Clown

2007

- Bill Anderson
- Buff Bagwell

2010

- Darren “Dynamite D” McMillan
- Super Dragon
- Enrique Torres

2016

- Bobo Brazil
- Cincinnati Red
- Sandor Szabo

2017

- Joey "Kaos" Munoz
- Man Mountain Dean
- Superboy
- Charlie Haas

2020

- Christopher Daniels
- Ernie Ladd
- Jeff Walton
- Jon Ian
- Rick Knox
