= Glorias de Lucha Libre =

Wrestling hall of fame in Mexico City, Mexico

The Glorias de Lucha Libre Hall of Fame, founded by Los Villanos in 2014, is a professional wrestling hall of fame in Mexico City, Mexico. The hall of fame is dedicated to honoring the best and most influential wrestlers in the history both Mexico and other Americas countries.

The organizers raised economic funds to create La Casa del Luchador, a home where retired professional wrestlers who were facing challenging conditions and were often neglected could live with dignity. Moreover, the funds raised were intended to create resources for medical care for fighters and former professional wrestlers who needed help to treat injuries they had sustained during their wrestling careers.

== 2014 inductees ==
This ceremony took place on April 2, 2014, at Expo Reforma in Mexico City.

- Gory Guerrero
- Cavernario Galindo
- Enrique Llanes
- Rito Romero
- Tarzán López
- Rayo de Jalisco
- Blue Demon
- Ray Mendoza
- Alfonso Dantés
- René Guajardo
- El Solitario
- Dos Caras
- Babe Face
- Villano III
- Ringo Mendoza
- El Faraón
- Cien Caras
- Fishman
- Gran Hamada
- "Tiger Mask" Satoru Sayama
- Américo Rocca
- Irma González
- Estela Molina
- Salvador Lutteroth (promoter)
- Francisco Flores (promoter)
- Antonio Peña (promoter)
- Edi Palau (referee)
- José Luis Valero Mere (journalist)

== See also ==
- Lucha libre - a professional wrestling style originary from Mexico
- List of professional wrestling halls of fame
