= WWA World Heavyweight Championship (Mexico) =

Professional wrestling championship

WWA World Heavyweight Championship (Campeonato Mundial Peso Completo WWA)

Details
- Promotion: World Wrestling Association (WWA)
- Date established: September 4, 1986
- Current champion: Rayo de Jalisco, Jr.
- Date won: March 21, 2003
Statistics
- First champion: Bill Anderson
- Most reigns: Perro Aguayo (3 Times)
- Longest reign: Rayo de Jalisco, Jr. (8,141 days)
- Shortest reign: Scorpio (36 days)

The WWA World Heavyweight Championship (Campeonato Mundial Peso Completo WWA in Spanish) is a professional wrestling world heavyweight championship promoted by the Mexican Lucha Libre wrestling based promotion World Wrestling Association (WWA) since 1986. As the Championship was designated as a heavyweight title, the Championship can only officially be competed for by wrestlers weighing at least 105 kg (231 lb). However, as with most heavyweight titles the "minimum" weight requirement is often ignored.

As it was a professional wrestling championship, the championship was not won not by actual competition, but by a scripted ending to a match determined by the bookers and match makers. (Note: Hornbaker (2016) p. 550: "Professional wrestling is a sport in which match finishes are predetermined. Thus, win–loss records are not indicative of a wrestler's genuine success based on their legitimate abilities – but on now much, or how little they were pushed by promoters") On occasion the promotion declares a championship vacant, which means there is no champion at that point in time. This can either be due to a storyline, (Note: Duncan & Will (2000) p. 271, Chapter: Texas: NWA American Tag Team Title [World Class, Adkisson] "Championship held up and rematch ordered because of the interference of manager Gary Hart") or real life issues such as a champion suffering an injury being unable to defend the championship, (Note: Duncan & Will (2000) p. 20, Chapter: (United States: 19th Century & widely defended titles – NWA, WWF, AWA, IW, ECW, NWA) NWA/WCW TV Title "Rhodes stripped on 85/10/19 for not defending the belt after having his leg broken by Ric Flair and Ole & Arn Anderson") or leaving the company. (Note: Duncan & Will (2000) p. 201, Chapter: (Memphis, Nashville) Memphis: USWA Tag Team Title "Vacant on 93/01/18 when Spike leaves the USWA.")

Bill Anderson was the first champion, defeating Tinieblas in the finals of a tournament on October 4, 1986. Perro Aguayo is the wrestler that has held the championship the most times, three, Mil Mascaras is the only other wrestler to have won the title more than once. The current champion is Rayo de Jalisco, Jr., having defeated Rey Misterio, Sr. in a tournament final on March 21, 2003. Since the WWA titles have been largely unsanctioned since the late 1990s it means that they can be defended on any wrestling show, not just limited to WWA promoted shows. (Note: Duncan & Will (2000) p. 400, Chapter: "Mexico: WWA World Wrestling Association Heavyweight Title (Benjamin Mora Jr.)")

== Title history ==
Key
No.	Overall reign number
Reign	Reign number for the specific champion
Days	Number of days held
N/A	Unknown information
†	Championship change is unrecognized by the promotion

No.	Champion	Championship change			Reign statistics		Notes	Ref.
No.	Champion	Date	Event	Location	Reign	Days	Notes	Ref.
1	Bill Anderson	October 4, 1986	Live event	(Note: The exact location of the title change has not been captured as part of the championship documentation.)	1	119	Defeated Tinieblas to become first champion.	
2	Tinieblas	January 31, 1987	Live event	Los Angeles, California	1	(Note: The exact date on which Tinieblas lost the title is unknown, placing the title reign between 182 and 212 days.)		
3	Super Halcón	August 1987	Live event	Los Angeles, California	1			
—		N/A	—	—			WWA stops promoting in Los Angeles area in 1988 and moves across the border to Tijuana.	
4	Dos Caras	1989	Live event		1	(Note: The exact date on which Dos Caras won the title is unknown, placing the title reign between 262 and 626 days.)		
5	Scorpio Jr.	September 19, 1990	Live event	Naucalpan, Mexico	1	36		
6	Mil Máscaras	October 25, 1991	Live event	Tijuana, Mexico	1	(Note: The exact date on which the title was vacated is unknown, placing the title reign between 799 and 1,163 days.)		
—	Vacated	1994	—	—	—	—	Championship vacated for unknown reasons	
7	Perro Aguayo	September 18, 1994	Live event	Nuevo Laredo, Mexico	1	(Note: The exact date on which Pero Aguayo lost the title is unknown, placing the title reign between 105 and 380 days.)	Defeated Cien Caras to win the vacant title.	
8	Cien Caras	1995		Live event	1	(Note: The exact date on which Cien Caras won the title is unknown, placing the title reign between 1 and 276 days.)		
9	Perro Aguayo	October 4, 1995	Live event	Aguascalientes, Mexico	2	23		
10	Cibernético	October 27, 1995	Live event	Tehuacan, Mexico	1	49		
11	Perro Aguayo	December 15, 1995	Live event	Mexico City, Mexico	3	560		
12	Cobarde Jr.	June 27, 1997	Live event	Tala, Mexico	1	(Note: The exact date on which Cobarde Jr. lost the title is unknown, placing the title reign between 553 and 917 days.)		
13	Mil Máscaras	1999		Live event	2			
—	Vacated	N/A	—	—	—	—	Championship vacated for unknown reasons	
14	Rayo de Jalisco Jr.	March 21, 2003	Live event	Tijuana, Mexico	1	1800	Defeated Rey Misterio, Sr. to win the vacant title.	
—	Vacated	February 23, 2008	—	—	—	—	WWA stripped Jalisco of the title after no-showing a title defense.	
