= Pro Wrestling Report =

Radio/TV program from Milwaukee, United States

- Genre: sports talk
- Country of origin: United States
- Language: English
- Home station: 540 ESPN
- TV adaptations: My 24
- Hosted by: Dameon Nelson; Dave Herro
- Created by: Dameon Nelson
- Recording studio: Milwaukee, WI
- Original release: March 18, 1998

The Pro Wrestling Report is a weekly sports talk radio and television program. It was first broadcast on March 18, 1998 and was a weekly ESPN radio show and television series, carried by WAUK and WCGV-TV under brokered programming arrangements in Milwaukee. PWR is produced by Dameon Nelson and is based out of Milwaukee, Wisconsin. Nelson announced the closure of PWR on April 28, 2018, but the show returned in March 2020 on YouTube and FITE TV.

== History ==
The show was created by Dameon Nelson, who cohosts the show with booker Dave Herro. Herro is a POWW Hall of Famer. Frank Cossentino was a sporadic contributor but dedicated most of his time to hosting a Fantasy Football show on ESPN Radio.

The first broadcast of the Pro Wrestling Report took place on March 18, 1998. The show was originally a 30-minute call-in show but was changed to an hour-long pre-taped show in 1999. PWR later aired on Time Warner cable after airings of WWE Smackdown. In June 2008, PWR began broadcasting a two-hour radio show on 540 ESPN while streaming shows internationally online. In 2006, PWR began uploading episodes to YouTube; in 2012 PWR celebrated 10 million YouTube views with an hour-long special. PWR began broadcasting weekly television shows on My 24 in September 2011. From 2011 to 2018, PWR hosted a "Shenanigans Party" during WWE WrestleMania in its host city. Kevin Nash hosted each event.

PWR gives annual awards and recognition at the end of each year to wrestlers whose achievement is noteworthy. Co-host Dave Herro also named a Star of the Week on every Saturday night TV broadcast. The PWR Lifetime Achievement Award was introduced in 2009, when Bobby Heenan was recognized for the award. PWR awarded a prolific wrestling personality every year since with Demolition (Ax and Smash), Gene Okerlund, and Kevin Nash being given the honor in subsequent years. In 2013, PWR announced the creation of the PWR Hall of Fame, with King Kong Bundy and Demolition joining the inaugural class. The induction ceremony took place on April 5, 2013, two days before WrestleMania 29.

Nelson announced the closure of PWR in a Facebook post on April 28, 2018. Herro was reunited with Nelson on February 29, 2020 at All Elite Wrestling's Revolution pay-per-view. In March 2020, new episodes were released on FITE TV's website.
