= Cincinnati Red =

American professional wrestler (1974–2015)

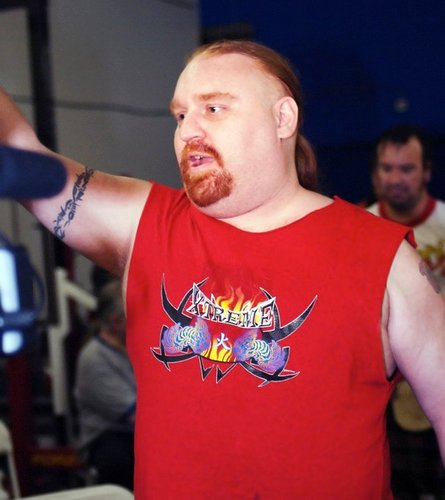
- Daves at a wrestling event in 2010

Personal information
- Born: Gregory Scott Daves; October 17, 1974 Athens, Georgia, U.S.
- Died: March 20, 2015 (aged 40) Victorville, California, U.S.

Professional wrestling career
- Ring name(s): Greg Davis; Scott Davis; Blackjack Daniels; Cincinnati Red
- Billed height: 6 ft 0 in (1.83 m)
- Trained by: Bill Anderson; Jesse Hernandez
- Debut: 1993
- Retired: June 19, 2010

Gregory Scott Daves (October 17, 1974 – March 20, 2015) was an American professional wrestler. He was best known by his ring name Cincinnati Red.

== Professional wrestling career ==
=== National Wrestling Conference (1995, 1997) ===
After training with Bill Anderson and Jesse Hernandez, Daves debuted under the ring name Blackjack Daniels, based on The Blackjacks (Blackjack Mulligan and Blackjack Lanza) tag team. He soon renamed himself to Cincinnati Red and joined the National Wrestling Conference, where he debuted on March 17, 1995, in a three-on-one handicap match, which he, RJ Rodriguez and The Wild Renegade lost to SWAT. Later that night, Red lost to The Thug. Red would continue to be used as an enhancement talent in the NWC, losing to the likes of Jim Neidhart, Don Juan and Larry Power. On August 25, Red teamed with Billy Anderson to form The Mercenaries, but they lost to Aerial Assault (Bobby Bradley and Rob Van Dam) in the first round of a tournament for the Tag Team Championship. After leaving the NWC soon after, Red returned on March 28, 1997, losing to Neidhart. On July 12, he made his final appearance for the promotion in a losing effort to The Suicide Kid.

=== Empire Wrestling Federation and hiatus (1996–1999) ===
After a few years on the independent circuit, Daves traveled to Southern California to take part in the Empire Wrestling Federation's debut show on May 5, 1996. At the event, he debuted for the promotion under his Cincinnati Red name and had the distinction of wrestling in the first match in the promotion's history, where he competed against Brian Rodgers.

While on hiatus from in-ring competition, Daves and fellow wrestler Gary Key opened up The Grappler's Den, a wrestling school based in Oxnard, California. The Grappler's Den soon expanded into a promotion and was subsequently named the Impact Wrestling Federation. The IWF would go on to run shows within and throughout Ventura County, including Simi Valley, Oxnard, and Port Hueneme. In late 1999, Red and Key sold the IWF to fellow wrestler Steve "Navajo Warrior" Islas, who subsequently renamed the promotion to Impact Zone Wrestling. After the sale of the IWF, Daves continued to teach in wrestling schools, with one of his most notable students being future world champion Samoa Joe.

=== Return to wrestling (2001–2010) ===
When his former student Paul Ventimiglia started Millennium Pro Wrestling, Daves returned to the ring as the promotion's top heel. He defeated Little Guido on May 19, 2001, to capture the MPW World title. He held the title for 168 days.

On June 1, 2001, Daves and The Dog defeated Big Red Machine and Fake Scotty 2 Hotty by disqualification in a match for All Star Wrestling. He made his second and final appearance for ASW two days later, where he and Joe Kimble lost to The British Legend of Doom and Zebra Kid in a tag team tables match.

==== Return to the EWF (2005–2010) ====
Daves returned to the Empire Wrestling Federation in 2005, where he assumed the roles of booker and agent. On February 18, 2006, at The Battle At Bethel event, he made his in-ring return for the promotion under his Cincinnati Red name, where he and Greg Valentine defeated Syrus and Puma. On May 14, 2006, Red won the first Great Goliath Battle Royal, an annual battle royal held in honor of Pablo Crispin, who competed as The Great Goliath and trained Jesse Hernandez. As a result of winning the match, he was awarded both a trophy and also a match for the Heavyweight Championship. Instead, he forfeited his title match and gave his trophy to Paloma Crispin, Goliath's daughter. Daves remained with the company until 2010, when he was placed on their website's alumni list.

==== Millennium Pro Wrestling (2010) ====
After leaving the EWF, Daves returned to Millennium Pro Wrestling on May 29, 2010, for their Not Another Pointless Reboot event. He faced his former protégé "Lethal" Logan X in a "Hair vs. Badge" match. He was managed by Tex Tunney. Logan proved victorious and "Rowdy" Roddy Piper was given the distinction of cutting Red's trademark hair.

== Death ==
On March 20, 2015, Jesse Hernandez, who promotes the Empire Wrestling Federation and trained Daves, announced that Daves had died from a heart attack.

== Championships and accomplishments ==
- Empire Wrestling Federation
  - Great Goliath Memorial Battle Royal (2006)
- Impact Wrestling Federation
  - IWF Heavyweight Championship (1 time)
  - IWF Western States Championship (1 time)
- Millennium Pro Wrestling
  - MPW Heavyweight Championship (1 time)
- SoCal Uncensored Awards
  - Wrestler of the Year (1999)
- United Independent Wrestling Alliance
  - UIWA Heavyweight Championship (1 time)
  - UIWA Tag Team Championship (1 time) – with Johnny Hemp
