= World Wrestling Association =

Mexican professional wrestling promotion

- Acronym: WWA
- Founded: 1986
- Style: Lucha libre
- Headquarters: Tijuana, Baja California, Mexico
- Founder: Benjamin Mora Jr.
- Owner: Benjamin Mora Jr.

The World Wrestling Association (WWA) (Asociación Mundial de Lucha Libre in Spanish) is a professional wrestling promotion based in the Tijuana-area of Mexico. It was founded in 1986 by Benjamin Mora Jr.. It featured some of Mexico's best luchadores at the time, such as Rey Misterio Jr., La Parka and Juventud Guerrera, during the late 1980s and early 1990s and was also featured on American television via the Fox Sports en Español channel.

Although inactive during the late 1990s, during which time much of its roster had left to compete in World Championship Wrestling and international promotions, the World Wrestling Association resumed operations in 2004.

== Championships ==
Championship	Current champion(s)	Date won	Days	Location
WWA World Heavyweight Championship	Rayo de Jalisco Jr.	March 21, 2003	8,444	Tijuana
WWA World Junior Heavyweight Championship	Cien Caras Jr.	May 5, 2014	4,381	Guadalajara
WWA World Junior Light Heavyweight Championship ^{1}	Atlantis	December 5, 2014	4,167	Tijuana
WWA World Light Heavyweight Championship	Heddi Karaoui	November 11, 2013	4,556	Mexico City
WWA World Lightweight Championship	TJ Boy	May 17, 2013	4,734	Tijuana
WWA World Middleweight Championship	Olímpico	February 20, 2009	6,281	Puebla
WWA World Minis Championship	Mascarita Sagrada	July 11, 2015	3,949	London
WWA World Tag Team Championship	Bestia 666 and Damián 666	December 5, 2014	4,167	Tijuana
WWA World Trios Championship	Trios Fantasia (Super Muñeco, Super Pinocho & Super Raton)	December 14, 2013	4,523	Tampico
WWA World Welterweight Championship	Bandido	September 28, 2017	3,139	Aguascalientes

=== Footnotes ===
^{1} Although the official WWA Junior Heavyweight title is currently being defended in Mexico, A disputed Branch of the title has surfaced in Japan.

== Roster ==
The roster included some widely popular wrestlers such as:

- L.A. Park
- Super Parka
- Blue Panther
- El Hijo del Santo
- Rey Misterio Sr.
- Rey Mysterio Jr.
- Perro Aguayo Jr.
- Blue Demon Jr.
- Nicho el Millonario
- Juventud Guerrera
- Guerrero de la Noche
- Pentagon Black
- The Patriot
- Racing Dawg
- Espectro Jr.
- Scorpio Jr.
- Tiger Jeet Singh
- Alcatraz, Backstage interviewer (also Benjamin Moras Brother)
- Armando Munoz, Backstage interviewer
- Extreme Tiger
- Tinieblas Jr.
- Mil Mascaras
- Rayo de Jalisco
- Perro Aguayo
- Brazo de Plata (Super Porky)
- Kayra
- Lola Gonzales
- Shocker
- Vampiro

== On DVD ==
In 2006 World Wrestling Organization was released on DVD. It features 25 matches from The WWA broadcasts that were featured on Fox sports en Espanol.

== See also ==
- List of professional wrestling promotions in Mexico
