= Saul Weingeroff =

American professional wrestling manager

- Saul Weingeroff with The Von Brauners

Personal information
- Born: March 6, 1916 Brooklyn, New York, U.S.
- Died: March 14, 1988 (aged 72) Nashville, Tennessee, U.S.

Professional wrestling career
- Ring name: Saul Weingeroff
- Debut: 1955
- Retired: 1976

Solomon "Saul" Weingeroff (March 6, 1916 – March 14, 1988) was an American professional wrestling manager, known by his ringname "Gentleman" Saul Weingeroff, who led several tag teams to the NWA World Tag Team Championship during the 1960s and 70s such as The Islanders (Afa and Sika) and Kurt and Karl Von Brauner.

== Professional wrestling career ==
Often using his signature cane as well as fireballs (one of the earliest managers to do so) to aid in the victories of his wrestlers, he and the Von Brauners were one of the most popular "heels" in the National Wrestling Alliance during the early 1960s both for the Von Brauners Nazi-like in ring personas as well as his eccentric antics such as his entering the 1964 U.S. presidential election. The cause of rioting in several major cities, the trio often needed to have a police escort before and after wrestling events.

A well known personality in the Memphis-area, he and The Spoilers (Lorenzo Parente and Joey Corea) also had a long running feud with manager J.C. Dykes and The Masked Infernos (Frankie Cain and Rocky Smith) over the NWA Tennessee Tag Team Championship during the late 1960s later facing Dykes in several wrestling matches.

Among others he had managed during his near 30-year career included The Masked Strangler, Sweet Daddy Watts, "Pistol" Pez Whatley, The Legionnaires Sgt. Jacques Goulet and Soldier LeBeouf), The Spoilers (Lorenzo Parente and Joey Corea), Mephisto and Dante, Tojo Yamamoto and Sugi Sito (and later Johnny Long), Sputnik and Rocket Monroe and Angelo and Lanny Poffo. He is also the father of professional wrestler George Weingeroff.

Weingeroff retired in 1976. Operating a sign shop in downtown Nashville in his later years, he was also a regular guest columnist for Lew Eskin's Official Wrestling, Wrestling Monthly and Wrestling Review until his death on March 14, 1988.

His son, George Weingeroff was also a wrestler.

== Championships and accomplishments ==
- National Wrestling Alliance
  - NWA Hall of Fame (2006)
