= Mike Webster (Canadian football) =

Canadian football player

Profile
- Position: Tackle

Personal information
- Born: 1944 (age 81–82); Victoria, British Columbia, Canada
- Listed height: 6 ft 1 in (1.85 m)
- Listed weight: 255 lb (116 kg)

Career information
- College: University of Notre Dame

Career history
- 1966: BC Lions
- 1967–70: Montreal Alouettes

Awards and highlights
- Grey Cup champion (1970)

Michael Webster is a Canadian clinical psychologist and former Canadian Football League player for the Montreal Alouettes and BC Lions, and Grey Cup champion. He was also a successful professional wrestler.

Webster first learned football in Vancouver and used those skills to play at the famous University of Notre Dame. He returned home to play one season with the BC Lions, 16 games, before he was traded to the Montreal Alouettes. He played 4 seasons and 56 games with the Larks, winning the Grey Cup in 1970. He was also a player representative, and his activities got him traded to the Hamilton Tiger-Cats. Faced with a substantial cut in pay, he retired from football. He had also studied psychology at McGill University while in Montreal.

Being very big, and having met several football players that were wrestlers, professional wrestling became his next career. From 1971 to 1976 he became Iron Mike Webster on the wrestling circuit mainly in Vancouver and Pacific Northwest. During this period he completed his master's degree at Western Washington University. After leaving wrestling he completed his PhD in 1981 from Western Washington.

This led to his final career as a clinical psychologist, teaching at "the British Columbia Police Academy, the Canadian Police College, Europol, and the FBI Academy at Quantico, Virginia." He has specialized "in working with police crisis teams." This includes the Branch Davidian standoff in Waco, Texas in 1993, the 1995 standoff at Gustafsen Lake, B.C, and testifying at the Braidwood Inquiry.

== Championships and accomplishments ==
- Cauliflower Alley Club
  - Men's Wrestling Award (2012)
- Championship Wrestling from Florida
  - NWA Florida Tag Team Championship (1 time) – with Doug Gashouse Gilbert
- NWA All-Star Wrestling
  - NWA Canadian Tag Team Championship (Vancouver version) (1 time) - with Bugsy McGraw (1)
  - NWA Pacific Coast Heavyweight Championship (Vancouver version) (1 time)
