= Chris Tolos =

Greek-Canadian professional wrestler (1929–2005)

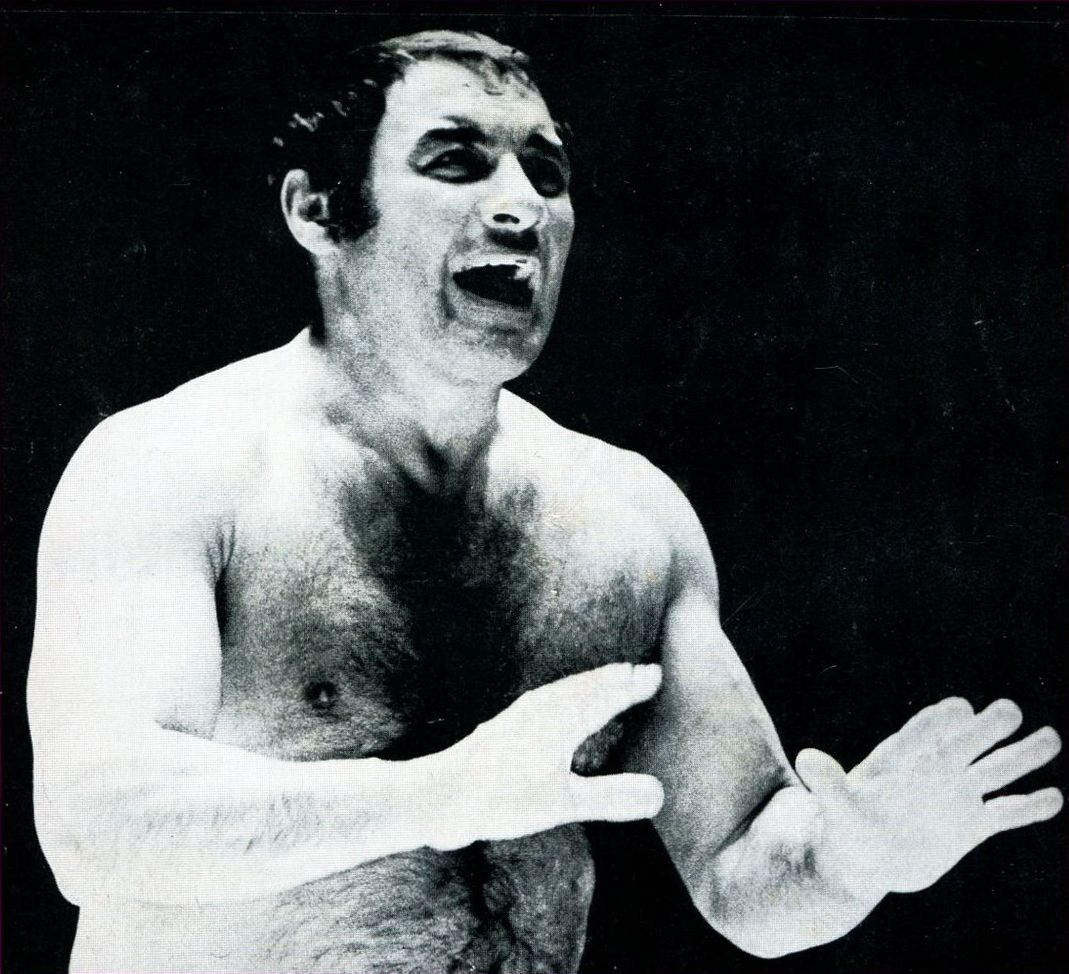

Personal information
- Born: December 5, 1929 Hamilton, Ontario, Canada
- Died: August 13, 2005 (aged 75) Hamilton, Ontario, Canada
- Cause of death: Cancer

Professional wrestling career
- Ring name: Chris Tolos
- Billed height: 6 ft 0 in (183 cm)
- Billed weight: 220 lb (100 kg)
- Debut: 1951
- Retired: 1980

Chris Tolos (December 5, 1929 – August 13, 2005) was a Canadian professional wrestler.

== Early life ==
Chris was the oldest of the three children born on December 5, 1929, to Greek parents, Nicolaos and Evangelia (Evangeline) Tolos, in Hamilton, Ontario where he and his brother John played football, hockey, lacrosse and track, and learned to wrestle. Chris got into professional wrestling via Wee Willie Davis and made his debut in Buffalo around 1951.

== Professional wrestling career ==
Chris debuted as a heel at first, losing preliminary bouts to such performers as Johnny Barend, Sandor Kovacs and Don Beitelman (Curtis), all of whom he would fight many times over the years.

He soon formed a team with his brother John. They held numerous tag titles, including the WWWF U.S. tag titles in 1963, the NWA World Tag Team Championship in Florida in 1964 and in Detroit that same year, the World and Canadian tag titles in Vancouver in 1967 and the Pacific Coast tag belts in California in 1953.

In 1972, Chris went to Los Angeles and teamed with John as babyfaces, against Black Gordman and Goliath, one of his few stints as a babyface.

In the late 1960s he feuded with Iron Mike DiBiase in Omaha, and was a contender for the NWA World title.

== Death ==
Chris Tolos died of cancer on Friday, August 13, 2005. His brother and tag team partner John died in May 2009.

== Championships and accomplishments ==
- American Wrestling Association
  - AWA Midwest Tag Team Championship (1 time) - with Stan Pulaski
- Big Time Wrestling
  - NWA World Tag Team Championship (Detroit version) (1 time) - with John Tolos
- Championship Wrestling from Florida
  - NWA World Tag Team Championship (Florida version) (1 time) - with John Tolos
- Maple Leaf Wrestling
  - NWA International Tag Team Championship (Toronto version) (3 times) - with John Tolos
- Mid-Atlantic Championship Wrestling
  - NWA Southern Tag Team Championship (1 time) - with John Tolos
- NWA All-Star Wrestling
  - NWA Canadian Tag Team Championship (Vancouver version) (2 times) - with John Tolos
  - NWA World Tag Team Championship (Vancouver version) (2 times) - with John Tolos
- Professional Wrestling Hall of Fame and Museum
  - Class of 2007 - Inducted as a member of the Canadian Wrecking Crew (with John Tolos)
- Stampede Wrestling
  - NWA International Tag Team Championship (Calgary version) (1 time) - with John Tolos
- World Wide Wrestling Association
  - WWWA American Tag Team Championship/WWWA World Tag Team Championship (1 time, final) - with John Tolos
- World Wide Wrestling Federation
  - WWWF United States Tag Team Championship (1 time) - with John Tolos
