= NWA World Tag Team Championship (Florida version) =

Professional wrestling tag team championship

- One of the belts representing the championship

Details
- Promotion: Championship Wrestling from Florida
- Date established: January 1961
- Date retired: 1969
Statistics
- First champions: The Von Brauners (Kurt and Karl Von Brauner)
- Most reigns: As a Team: The Von Brauners (6 reigns); Individual: Eddie Graham (7 reigns)
- Longest reign: The Von Brauners (At least 196 days)
- Shortest reign: Eddie Graham and Jose Lothario (9 days)

The Florida version of the NWA World Tag Team Championship was the primary professional wrestling championship for tag teams in Championship Wrestling from Florida (CWF) that was used between 1961 and 1969. When the National Wrestling Alliance (NWA) was created in 1948, the board of directors decided to allow each NWA member to create its own local version of the NWA World Tag Team Championship. As it is a professional wrestling championship, it is not won or lost competitively, but instead determined by the decision of the bookers of a wrestling promotion. The title is awarded after the chosen team "wins" a match to maintain the illusion that professional wrestling is a competitive sport.

CWF, the NWA's Florida territory, introduced their version of the NWA World Tag Team Championship in January 1961 when they introduced the Von Brauners (Kurt and Karl Von Brauner) as the NWA World Tag Team Champions. Records are unclear on how the Von Brauners became champions; it is possible that they were simply billed as champions upon arrival. In 1969 CWF abandoned the NWA World Tag Team Championship, with the Masked Infernos as the last champions. CWF later used the NWA North American Tag Team Championship, NWA Southern Tag Team Championship, NWA United States Tag Team Championship, and NWA Florida Global Tag Team Championship.

The Von Brauners hold the record for most championship reigns, six in total, as well as the longest combined reigns, with at least 540 days. The Von Brauners' first reign, and the first reign of the championship, lasted at least 196 days, the longest individual reign. Eddie Graham held the championship on seven occasions with various partners. The shortest individual reign lasted nine days as Eddie Graham and Jose Lothario held it from October 25 to November 3, 1966.

== Title history ==
Key
No.	Overall reign number
Reign	Reign number for the specific team—reign numbers for the individuals are in parentheses, if different
Days	Number of days held

No.	Champion	Championship change			Reign statistics		Notes	Ref.
No.	Champion	Date	Event	Location	Reign	Days	Notes	Ref.
1	The Von Brauners (Kurt and Karl Von Brauner)	January 1961	CWF show	Florida	1	(Note: The date where the Von Brauners won the championship has not been documented which means the championship reign lasted anywhere between 196 and 226 days.)		
2	Eddie Graham and Ike Eakins	August 15, 1961	CWF show	Jacksonville, Florida	1	7		
3	The Von Brauners (Kurt and Karl Von Brauner)	August 22, 1961	CWF show	Tampa, Florida	2	9		
4	Eddie Graham and Ike Eakins	August 31, 1961	CWF show	Jacksonville, Florida	2	(Note: The date where the championship was vacated has not been documented which means the championship reign lasted anywhere between 1 day and 6 days.)		
—	Vacated	September 1961	—	—	—	—	Championship vacated for undocumented reasons	
5	The Von Brauners (Kurt and Karl Von Brauner)	September 7, 1961	CWF show	Jacksonville, Florida	3	203	Defeated Ike Eakins and Eddie Graham in a Three team tournament final	
5	Don Curtis and Joe Scarpa	March 29, 1962	CWF show	Jacksonville, Florida	1	72		
—	Vacated	June 9, 1962	—	—	—	—	Title was held up after the match between Don Curtis and Joe Scarpa and The Von Brauners.	
6	The Von Brauners (Kurt and Karl Von Brauner)	June 14, 1962	CWF show	Jacksonville, Florida	4	5	Defeated Don Curtis and Georgia Boy Smith in a three-team tournament final to win the championship.	
7	Don Curtis and Joe Scarpa	June 19, 1962	CWF show	Jacksonville, Florida	2	16		
8	The Assassins (Assassin #1 and Assassin #2)	July 5, 1962	CWF show	Jacksonville, Florida	1	(Note: The date where the championship was vacated has not been documented which means the championship reign lasted anywhere between 27 and 55 days.)		
—	Vacated	August 1962	—	—	—	—	Championship vacated for undocumented reasons	
9	Boris Malenko and Russian Crusher	August 30, 1962	CWF show	Jacksonville, Florida	1	44	Defeated The Kentuckians in a four-team tournament final	
10	Flying Frenchmen (Tony Baillargeon and Maurice Lapoine)	October 13, 1962	CWF show	Tampa, Florida	1	40		
11	The Fabulous Kangaroos (Al Costello and Roy Heffernan)	November 22, 1962	CWF show	Jacksonville, Florida	1	63		
12	Don Curtis (2) and Mark Lewin	January 24, 1963	CWF show	Florida	1	(Note: The date where the championship was vacated has not been documented which means the championship reign lasted anywhere between 1 day and 4 days.)		
—	Vacated	January 1963	—	—	—	—	Championship vacated for undocumented reasons	
13	The Von Brauners (Kurt and Karl Von Brauner)	January 29, 1963	CWF show	Jacksonville, Florida	5	(Note: The date where the championship was lost has not been documented which means the championship reign lasted anywhere between 62 and 91 days.)	Defeated Yukon Eric and Don Curtis in a three-team tournament final.	
14	Torres (Alberto Torres and Ramón Torres)	April 1963	CWF show	Florida	1	(Note: The date where the championship was won has not been documented which means the championship reign lasted anywhere between 37 and 66 days.)		
15	Hiro Matsuda and Duke Keomuka	June 6, 1963	CWF show	Jacksonville, Florida	1	(Note: The date where the championship was vacated has not been documented which means the championship reign lasted anywhere between 1 day and 90 days.)		
—	Vacated	August 1963	—	—	—	—	Championship vacated for undocumented reasons	
16	The Von Brauners (Kurt and Karl Von Brauner)	September 5, 1963	CWF show	Jacksonville, Florida	6	(Note: The date where the championship was lost has not been documented which means the championship reign lasted anywhere between 57 and 76 days.)	Defeated The Assassins in a five-team tournament final.	
17	The Assassins (Assassin #1 and Assassin #2)	November 1963	CWF show	Florida	2	(Note: The date where the championship was lost has not been documented which means the championship reign lasted anywhere between 1 day and 21 days.)		
18	Don Curtis (3) and Mark Lewin	November 21, 1963	CWF show	Jacksonville, Florida	2	(Note: The date where the championship was vacated has not been documented which means the championship reign lasted anywhere between 41 and 67 days.)		
—	Vacated	January 1964	—	—	—	—	Lewin left the Florida territory	
19	Skull Murphy and Brute Bernard	January 28, 1964	CWF show	Tampa, Florida	1	(Note: The date where the championship was lost has not been documented which means the championship reign lasted anywhere between 1 day and 2 days.)	Defeated Don Curtis and Haystacks Calhoun to win the vacant championship	
20	Hiro Matsuda and Duke Keomuka	February 1964	CWF show	Tampa, Florida	2	(Note: The date where the championship was lost has not been documented which means the championship reign lasted anywhere between 1 day and 16 days.)		
21	Skull Murphy and Brute Bernard	February 18, 1964	CWF show	Tampa, Florida	2	21		
22	Hiro Matsuda and Duke Keomuka	March 10, 1964	CWF show	Tampa, Florida	3	56		
23	Don Curtis (4) and Abe Jacobs	May 5, 1964	CWF show	Tampa, Florida	1	37		
24	Chris and John Tolos	June 11, 1964	CWF show	Jacksonville, Florida	1	12		
25	Eddie Graham (2) and Sam Steamboat	June 23, 1964	CWF show	Tampa, Florida	1	133		
26	Tarzan and Tim Tyler	November 3, 1964	CWF show	Tampa, Florida	1	37		
27	Eddie Graham (3) and Sam Steamboat	December 10, 1964	CWF show	Jacksonville, Florida	2	48		
28	Fred Blassie and Tarzan Tyler	January 27, 1965	CWF show	Jacksonville, Florida	1	54		
29	Hiro Matsuda and Duke Keomuka	March 22, 1965	CWF show	Tampa, Florida	4	134		
30	Rip Hawk and Swede Hanson	August 3, 1965	CWF show	Tampa, Florida	1	60		
31	Sam Steamboat (3) and Ron Etchison	October 2, 1965	CWF show	Tampa, Florida	1	21		
32	Kurt and Skull Von Stroheim	October 23, 1965	CWF show	Tampa, Florida	1	32		
33	Hiro Matsuda (5) and Dick Steinborn (2)	November 24, 1965	CWF show	Jacksonville, Florida	1	15		
34	Dick Steinborn (3)	December 9, 1965	CWF show	Jacksonville, Florida	1	(Note: The date where the championship was vacated has not been documented which means the championship reign lasted anywhere between 23 and 53 days.)	Defeated Matsuda to win both championship belts	
—	Vacated	January 1966	—	—	—	—	Championship vacated after Steinborn left the Florida territory	
35	The Medics (Medic #1 and Medic #2)	February 22, 1966	CWF show	Tampa, Florida	1	56	Defeated Jose Lothario and Tito Carrión in a tournament final	
36	Eddie Graham (4) and Bob Orton	April 19, 1966	CWF show	Tampa, Florida	1	(Note: The date where the championship was vacated has not been documented which means the championship reign lasted anywhere between 12 and 27 days.)		
—	Vacated	May 1966	—	—	—	—	Championship vacated for undocumented reasons	
37	Eddie Graham (5) and Bob Orton	May 17, 1966	CWF show	Tampa, Florida	2	(Note: The date where the championship was vacated has not been documented which means the championship reign lasted anywhere between 1 day and 14 days.)	Won a three-team tournament.	
—	Vacated	May 1966	—	—	—	—	Championship vacated when Orton left the Florida territory	
38	Jose Lothario and Wahoo McDaniel	June 28, 1966	CWF show	Jacksonville, Florida	1	(Note: The date where the championship was lost has not been documented which means the championship reign lasted anywhere between 3 and 32 days.)		
—	Vacated	July 1966	—	—	—	—	McDaniel was told by the Miami Dolphins to stop wrestling while he played for them	
39	The Infernos (Frankie Cain and Rocky Smith)	October 6, 1966	CWF show	Jacksonville, Florida	1	19		
40	Eddie Graham (6) and Jose Lothario (2)	October 25, 1966	CWF show	Tampa, Florida	1	9		
41	The Infernos (Frankie Cain and Rocky Smith)	November 3, 1966	CWF show	Tampa, Florida	2	(Note: The date where the championship was vacated has not been documented which means the championship reign lasted anywhere between 1 day and 24 days.)		
—	Vacated	November 1966	—	—	—	—	Title was held up after the match between The Infernos and José Lothario and Sam Steamboat.	
42	Jose Lothario (3) and Sam Steamboat (4)	November 29, 1966	CWF show	Tampa, Florida	1	14		
43	The Infernos (Frankie Cain and Rocky Smith)	December 13, 1966	CWF show	Tampa, Florida	3	112		
44	Sputnik and Rocket Monroe	April 4, 1967	CWF show	Tampa, Florida	1	35		
45	Jose Lothario (4) and Wahoo McDaniel (2)	May 9, 1967	CWF show	Tampa, Florida	2	16		
46	Sputnik and Rocket Monroe	May 25, 1967	CWF show	Jacksonville, Florida	2	49		
47	Eddie Graham (7) and Sam Steamboat (5)	July 13, 1967	CWF show	Jacksonville, Florida	3	54		
48	Kurt and Skull Von Stroheim	September 5, 1967	CWF show	Tampa, Florida	2	49		
49	Paul DeMarco and Lorenzo Parente	October 24, 1967	CWF show	Tampa, Florida	1	28		
50	Terry and Ron Garvin	November 21, 1967	CWF show	Tampa, Florida	1	56		
51	Paul DeMarco and Lorenzo Parente	January 16, 1968	CWF show	Tampa, Florida	2	28		
52	The Infernos (Frankie Cain and Rocky Smith)	February 13, 1968	CWF show	Tampa, Florida	4	364		
53	The Masked Infernos (Masked Inferno #1 and Masked Inferno #2)	February 11, 1969	CWF show	Tampa, Florida	1	1		
—	Deactivated	1969	—	—	—	—	The championship was abandoned by the promotion	

== Team reigns by combined length ==
Key

Symbol	Meaning
¤	The exact length of at least one title reign is uncertain, so the shortest possible length is used.

Rank	Team	# of reigns	Combined days
1	The Von Brauners (Kurt and Karl Von Brauner)	6	540¤
2	Eddie Graham and Sam Steamboat	3	235
3	The Infernos (Frankie Cain and Rocky Smith)	4	159
4	Hiro Matsuda and Duke Keomuka	4	137¤
5	Sputnik and Rocket Monroe	2	84
6	Kurt and Skull Von Stroheim	2	81
7	The Fabulous Kangaroos (Al Costello and Roy Heffernan)	1	63
8	Rip Hawk and Swede Hanson	1	60
9	Terry and Ron Garvin	1	56
9	The Medics (Medic #1 and Medic #2)	1	56
11	Eddie Graham and Ike Eakins	1	54
12	Boris Malenko and Russian Crusher	1	44
13	Skull Murphy and Brute Bernard	2	43¤
14	Don Curtis and Mark Lewin	2	42¤
15	Tony Baillargeon and Maurice Lapoine	1	40
16	Don Curtis and Abe Jacobs	1	37
16	Torres Brothers (Alberto Torres and Ramón Torres)	1	37¤
16	Tarzan and Tim Tyler	1	37
17	Paul DeMarco and Lorenzo Parente	1	28
17	Paul DeMarco Paul DeMarco and Lorenzo Parente	1	28
17	The Assassins (Assassin #1 and Assassin #2)	2	28¤
19	Dick Steinborn	1	23¤
20	Sam Steamboat and Ron Etchison	1	21
21	Jose Lothario and Wahoo McDaniel	2	19¤
22	Fred Blassie and Tarzan Tyler	1	15
22	Hiro Matsuda and Dick Steinborn	1	15
24	Jose Lothario and Sam Steamboat	1	14
25	Eddie Graham and Bob Orton	2	13¤
26	Chris and John Tolos	1	12
27	Eddie Graham and Jose Lothario	1	9
28	Don Curtis and Joe Scarpa	1	1¤

== Individual reigns by combined length ==
Key

Symbol	Meaning
¤	The exact length of at least one title reign is uncertain, so the shortest possible length is used.

Rank	Wrestler	# of reigns	Combined days
1	Kurt Von Brauner	6	540¤
1	Karl Von Brauner	6	540¤
3	Eddie Graham	7	311¤
4	Sam Steamboat	5	270
5	Frankie Cain	4	159
5	Rocky Smith	4	159
7	Hiro Matsuda	5	152¤
8	Duke Keomuka	4	137¤
9	Rocket Monroe	2	84
9	Sputnik Monroe	2	84
11	Kurt Von Stroheim	2	81
11	Skull Von Stroheim	2	81
13	Don Curtis	4	80¤
14	Al Costello	1	63
14	Roy Heffernan	1	63
16	Steinborn	3	61¤
17	Rip Hawk	1	60
17	Swede Hanson	1	60
19	Paul DeMarco	2	56
19	Terry Garvin	1	56
19	Lorenzo Parente	2	56
19	Ron Garvin	1	56
19	Medic #1	1	56
19	Medic #2	1	56
25	Ike Eakins	1	54
25	Tarzan Tyler	2	52
25	Boris Malenko	1	44
25	Russian Crusher	1	44
27	Brute Bernard	2	43¤
27	Skull Murphy	2	43¤
29	Jose Lothario	4	42¤
29	Mark Lewin	2	42¤
31	Tony Baillargeon	1	40
31	Maurice Lapoine	1	40
33	Abe Jacobs	1	37
33	Tim Tyler	1	37
33	Alberto|Torres	1	37¤
33	Ramón Torres	1	37¤
37	Assassin #1	2	28¤
37	Assassin #2	2	28¤
39	Ron Etchison	1	21
40	Wahoo McDaniel	2	19¤
41	Fred Blassie	1	15
42	Bob Orton	2	13¤
43	Chris Tolos	1	12
43	John Tolos	1	12
45	Joe Scarpa	1	1¤

== Tournaments ==
=== 1961 ===
Semifinals		Finals
Ike Eakins and Eddie Graham	W
The Mighty Yankees		Ike Eakins and Eddie Graham
The Von Brauners		The Von Brauners
Bye

=== June 1962 ===
Semifinals		Finals
The Von Brauners	W
The Masked Assassins		The Masked Assassins	W
Don Curtis and Georgia Boy Smith		Don Curtis and Georgia Boy Smith
Bye

=== August 1962 ===
Semifinals		Finals
Boris Malenko and the Russian Crusher	W
The Kenutuckians		Boris Malenko and the Russian Crusher	W
Lenny Montana and Mike Paidousis	W	Lenny Montana and Mike Paidousis
The Assassins

=== January 1963 ===
Semifinals		Finals
Yukon Eric and Don Curtis	W
The Fabulous Kangaroos		Yukon Eric and Don Curtis
The Von Brauners		The Von Brauners	W
Bye

=== September 1963 ===
Quarterfinals
The Assassins
Bye
Boris Malenko and Killer Karl Kox	Draw
The Kentuckians
Hiro Matsuda and Duke Keomuka	W
Eddie Graham and Dick Steinborn

Semifinals
The Assassins
Bye
Hiro Matsuda and Duke Keomuka
Bye

Finals
The Assassins
Hiro Matsuda and Duke Keomuka	W
