= NWA World Tag Team Championship =

Professional wrestling championship

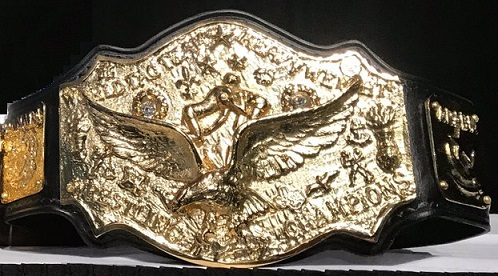
- The current NWA World Tag Team Championship (2019-present). Since the NWA 78th Anniversary Show on July 25, 2026 (aired September 19, 2026), current champions The Country Gentlemen have been using a custom version of this belt with white straps.

Details
- Promotion: National Wrestling Alliance
- Date established: July 12, 1992
- Current champions: The Country Gentlemen (AJ Cazana and KC Cazana)
- Date won: April 25, 2026 (aired May 30, 2026)
Statistics
- First champion: Terry Gordy and Steve Williams
- Most reigns: As tag team (6 reigns): America's Most Wanted; As individual (8 reigns): James Storm
- Longest reign: The Skullkrushers (Rasche Brown and Keith Walker) (777 days)
- Shortest reign: 1 day: David Flair and Dan Factor; Glacier and Jason Sugarman; The Heatseekers
- Oldest champion: Ricky Morton (63 years old)

The NWA World Tag Team Championship is a professional wrestling world tag team championship created by the National Wrestling Alliance. From 1948 to 1982, the NWA allowed member promotions to create their own territorial version of the "NWA World Tag Team Championship" without oversight from the board of directors. The first of these NWA World Tag Team Championships was created in 1950 in the San Francisco territory, which while billed as a "World" title was essentially restricted to the specific NWA territory. In 1957 as many as 13 versions of the NWA World Tag Team Championship were confirmed to be in existence. In 1982 Big Time Wrestling, based in Los Angeles, closed and abandoned their version of the championship. The following year, the World Wrestling Federation, an NWA member at the time and which had its own World Tag Team Championship, split from the NWA in acrimony. This meant that only the Jim Crockett Promotions' NWA World Tag Team Championship was active within the NWA, but still being controlled by JCP, not the NWA board of directors. In 1991 that championship was renamed the WCW World Tag Team Championship.

In 1992 the NWA board of directors decided to sanction one world-level NWA World Tag Team Championship, working with WCW to hold a tournament to determine the inaugural officially recognized, NWA World Tag Team Championship. In 1993, the NWA and WCW severed their relationship and the NWA took with it the tag team championship. The NWA would briefly allow the World Wrestling Federation to control the championship in 1998 but by 1999 that collaboration ended. In 2002 the NWA gave control of the NWA World Tag Team Championship to the newly formed NWA Total Nonstop Action (NWA-TNA) promotion. TNA's control of the championship ended in 2007, with TNA creating the TNA World Tag Team Championship as a result. In subsequent years the championship has been defended on various continents including a period of time where it was held by several teams working for New Japan Pro-Wrestling.

The Skullcrushers (Rasche Brown and Keith Walker) held the championship for 777 days, making them the longest reigning champions in the history of the NWA board-recognized championship. Three teams have held the championship for just one day: David Flair and Dan Factor, Glacier and Jason Sugarman, and The Heatseekers (Sigmon and Elliot Russel).

== History ==
=== Territory years (1950–1982) ===
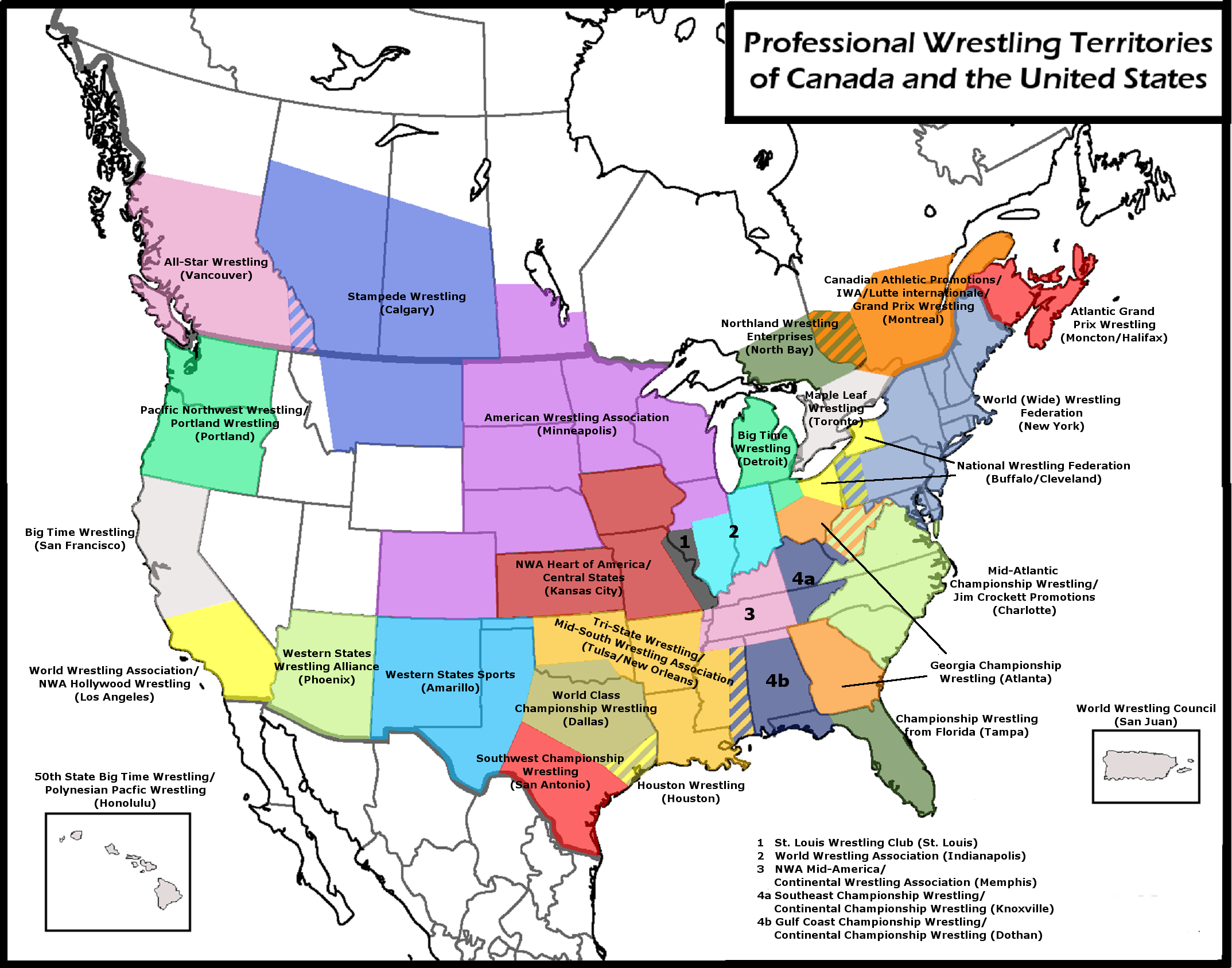
The original NWA territories in North America, most of which promoted a NWA World Tag Team Championship at some point.

In 1948 six professional wrestling promoters in the United States joined to form the National Wrestling Alliance (NWA) as a governing body for a number of different wrestling promotions, which then became known as the NWA territories. The promoters, (Pinkie George, Al Haft, Tony Stecher, Harry Light, Orville Brown and Sam Muchnick) formed a board of directors and decided that they would endorse two wrestling championships that all territories would recognize, the NWA World Heavyweight Championship and the NWA World Junior Heavyweight Championship. Those two championships were controlled by the board, who would meet to vote on who should be given the championship next.

At the time tag team wrestling, or matches where teams of two wrestlers would fight each other, was not popular across all territories, so the board of directors did not sanction a specific NWA World Tag Team Championship. This meant that each territory was free to create their own "World Tag Team Championship" as they saw fit and use it within their territory without board approval. Tag team wrestling first rose to popularity on the west coast of the United States, which led to the Los Angeles territory, promoted by Johnny Doyle, creating the first NWA World Tag Team Championship of the territory era when the Dusek Riot Squad (Emil and Ernie) were billed as the champions on a July 14, 1949, show in Long Beach. The following year the San Francisco territory followed suit and created their local version of the championship when Ray Eckert and Hard Boiled Haggerty defeated the team of Ron Etchison and Larry Moquin on April 4, 1950. A month later the Midwest Wrestling Association territory, covering Kansas, Missouri, Nebraska and Iowa, created their own version of the championship on May 26, 1950, as the Dusek Riot Squad (Emil and Joe) won that championship.

In 1953 the Chicago-based promoter Fred Kohler introduced the team of Lord James Blears and Lord Lathol Laytham as the local NWA World Tag Team champions, billing them as having won the championship in a different NWA territory before they began working for Kohler. Historic records do not indicate that Blears and Laytham had actually won the championship elsewhere. From mid-1953 the championship became the main tag team championship of the Illinois-Wisconsin territory. A few months later promoter Ed Don George brought in the Chicago champions to his Ohio-Upstate New York territory and used them to bring an air of legitimacy to his own version of the NWA World Tag Team Championship, allowing local wrestlers Bill Melby and Billy Darnell to defeat Blears and Martino Angelo (who substituted for an injured Athol).

In 1954 the Canadian Athletic Promotion, based in Montreal, used the NWA World Tag Team Championship name as well, but by the end of the year they had abandoned it. Also in 1954, Georgia Championship Wrestling introduced the Georgia version of the NWA World Tag Team Championship, using the Chicago version (held by Reggie Lisowki and Art Neilson) to start the Georgia branch.

The following year NWA founders Paul "Pinkie" George and Max Clayton introduced an Iowa-Nebraska version, with the champions splitting their time between George's Iowa territory and Clayton's Nebraska territory. The promoters billed Joe Tangaroa and Guy Brunetti as the local champions, recognizing the championship of the Chicago version up until September 1955, then splitting off in to their own lineage. Also in 1955, the first of two Texas-based NWA World Tag Team Championships was created by the Amarillo, Texas-based Big Time Wrestling, owned by Doc Sarpolis and Dory Funk. They followed in the footsteps of other NWA territories by having the Chicago champions (Lisowski and Neilson) travel to their territory to lose a version of the championship to start the local version. In this case Neilson worked regularly in the territory, while Lisowski left after only a brief stay. The promoters chose to have Rip Rogers replace Lisowski for the Amarillo version of the champions. Another version was introduced around 1955–1956 in the Idaho-Utah territory based out of Salt Lake City. The Indianapolis territory soon introduced another local version by recognizing the lineage of the Chicago version, before splitting it off into a separate entity in 1957 when Nicoli and Boris Volkoff won the championship.

Three additional versions of the championship were introduced in 1957, the first of which was in Minneapolis, where the Kalmikoffs (Ivan and Karol) won a tournament to become champions. The second new championship was also the second Texas-based championship as the eastern Texas-based Houston-Dallas territory introduced Verne Gagne and Wilbur Snyder as their local champions. The third championship introduced in 1957 was used by Nick Gulas' NWA Mid-America promotion when Gulas introduced the Corsicans (Corsica Joe and Corsica Jean) as champions when they made their debut for NWA Mid-America.

No new championships were introduced in 1958 or 1959, but with all versions being active but that of Montreal, thirteen versions were being defended across the United States in 1957. In 1959/1960 the unity of the NWA was strained as several promotions broke away from the NWA, choosing to join with Minnesota promoter Verne Gagne to form the American Wrestling Association. This meant that the Minneapolis, Chicago, Iowa-Nebraska, Indianapolis and Idaho-Utah versions of the championship were all abandoned, replaced by the AWA World Tag Team Championship that was recognized in all of those territories.

While the NWA lost some territories with the exodus to the AWA, others were added and additional NWA World Tag Team Championships were still being introduced. In 1961 Championship Wrestling from Florida created the Florida version of the championship as the Von Brauners (Kurt and Karl Von Brauner) became regular performers in Florida. In 1964 the Detroit-based Big Time Wrestling announced that Chris and John Tolos had won the newly created Detroit version of the championship on February 16, 1965. In 1966 NWA All-Star Wrestling introduced their own version, but by mid-1968 the promotion discontinued using them in favor of the NWA Canadian Tag Team Championship.

In 1968 the Amarillo territory stopped using their version of the world championship, favoring the NWA Western States Tag Team Championship instead. Only months later the Eastern Texas version was abandoned as well, once more in favor of a more regional championship name, the NWA Texas Tag Team Championship. Georgia Championship Wrestling followed the trend in 1969, with the NWA Georgia Tag Team Championship. By 1970 the Ohio-Upstate New York territory left the NWA and became known as the National Wrestling Federation, in the process they rebranded the tag team championship as it became known as the NWF World Tag Team Championship. No territory created a new world tag team championship until 1975 where the NWA Mid-Atlantic promotion in the Carolinas introduced the Mid-Atlantic version, the first new championship in nine years. This championship would later also be recognized by Georgia Championship Wrestling. In 1977 the NWA Mid-America territory was split in two as Jerry Lawler and Jerry Jarrett took over a large part of the territory when they created the Continental Wrestling Association (CWA). After the territory split, NWA Mid-America abandoned their version of the world tag team championship.

The W(W)WF was a member of the NWA between 1972 and 1983, thus the WWF World Tag Team championship, although never referred to as such, was technically another version of the NWA World Tag Team Championship during this period.

In 1979 the San Francisco version of the championship was abandoned, while Hollywood Wrestling reintroduced the Los Angeles version of the championship shortly afterwards. The same year the Central States version was abandoned, in favor of the NWA Central States Tag Team Championship. The Detroit territory closed its doors in 1980, ending their version of the championship. In 1981 World Class Championship Wrestling briefly brought back the east Texas version of the championship, but later abandoned it in favor of the NWA Americas Tag Team Championship.

Territorial versions of the NWA World Tag Team Championship

Created	Ended	Territory	Fate	Ref
1949	1957	Los Angeles (1)	Switched to the San Francisco version 1958-1979	
1950	1979	San Francisco	Abandoned	
1950	1979	Central States	Replaced with the NWA Central States Tag Team Championship	
1953	1960	Chicago	Replaced with the AWA World Tag Team Championship	
1953	1970	Ohio-New York	Replaced with the NWF World Tag Team Championship	
1954	1954	Montreal	Abandoned	
1954	1969	Georgia	Abandoned	
1955	1959	Iowa-Nebraska	Replaced with the AWA World Tag Team Championship	
1956	1960	Indianapolis	Replaced with the AWA World Tag Team Championship	
1956	1959	Idaho-Utah	Replaced with the AWA World Tag Team Championship	
1955	1968	West Texas	Replaced with the NWA Western States Tag Team Championship	
1957	1961	Northeast	Abandoned	
1957	1960	Minneapolis	Replaced with the AWA World Tag Team Championship	
1957	1982	East Texas	Replaced with the NWA American Tag Team Championship	
1957	1977	Mid-America	Promotion closed	
1961	1969	Florida	Replaced with the NWA Florida Tag Team Championship	
1964	1980	Detroit	Promotion closed	
1966	1967	Vancouver	Replaced with the NWA Canadian Tag Team Championship	
1975	1991	Mid Atlantic	Became the WCW World Tag Team Championship	
1979	1982	Los Angeles (2)	Promotion closed	

=== One championship (1982–1991) ===
In 1982 the Los Angeles territory closed, abandoning their version of the NWA World Tag Team Championship. This meant that the Mid-Atlantic version of the championship became the only NWA World Tag Team Championship that was still active from that point forward. (Note: Please see the "Territory versions of the NWA World Tag Team Championship " table above for full overview of dates and sources.) In 1980 MACW owner and promoter Jim Crockett Jr. became president of the NWA and started to consolidate the south eastern promotion, branding them as the "National Wrestling Alliance" while officially being known as Jim Crockett Promotions. The consolidation of the Crockett brand was done in part to combat the country-wide expansion of the World Wrestling Federation (WWF) in the early 1980s, breaking with the territory approach of the NWA. With JCP gaining national television deals the Mid-Atlantic version of the NWA World Tag Team Championship became a de facto "World" championship, moving from a regional championship and later recognized as a "World Championship" by Pro Wrestling Illustrated, the premier wrestling magazine at the time.

In 1988 the cost of the rapid expansion of JCP forced Crockett to sell his promotion to Turner Broadcasting System. Turner began to rebrand the promotion as World Championship Wrestling, but still used the NWA prefix for all of their championships at that point in time. In January 1991 WCW officially split from the NWA, spinning off the NWA Championships into WCW championships, which meant that then-reigning champions Doom (Ron Simmons and Butch Reed) became the first champions to officially be labeled as WCW World Tag Team Champions. At that point in time the NWA did not determine a new set of NWA World Tag Team Champions.

=== Officially sanctioned (1992–present) ===
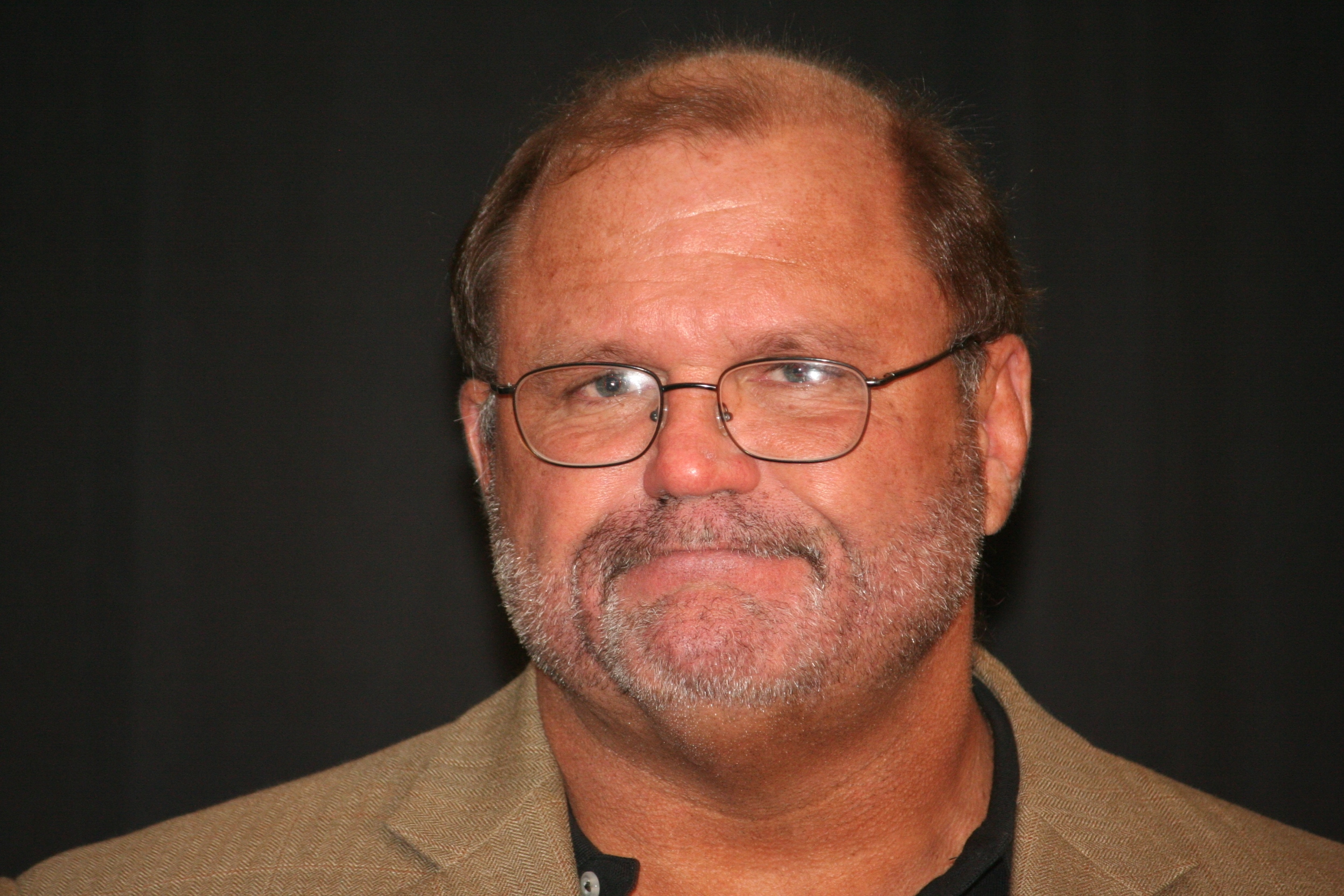
Arn Anderson, along with Paul Roma, the last WCW sanctioned champions.

A year after parting ways with the NWA, the two parties came to an agreement for WCW to host a tournament for the NWA World Tag Team Championship. To emphasize the global aspect of the championship, WCW and the NWA brought in several international teams for the tournament. Teams such as Silver King and El Texano from Mexico, Hiroshi Hase and Akira Nogami from Japan, Miguel Perez Jr. and Ricky Santana from Puerto Rico and Joe and Dean Malenko representing Europe. (Note: The Malenko brothers were born in America, and neither worked regularly in Europe, but played off the fact that they were sons of Boris Malenko, who portrayed a Russian character for most of his career.) The first round of the tournament took place on June 22, 1992, at WCW's Clash of the Champions XIX show, while the remaining tournament took place at the 1992 Great American Bash. In the period of time between the Clash and the Great American Bash the team of Terry Gordy and Steve Williams had won the WCW World Tag Team Championship from The Steiner Brothers, and when they won the tournament at the Great American Bash they became double champions, carrying two sets of belts each for their matches.

WCW had five championship changes happen for the combined WCW/NWA World Tag Team Championships happen between July 1992 and August 1993, after which the NWA broke off their relationship with WCW once more. Then-champions Arn Anderson and Paul Roma were stripped of the NWA championship, a fact that was not mentioned on TV as they kept defending the WCW championship. While the NWA initially recognized the five WCW booked championship reigns, they later removed them from their official history.

The NWA did not hold a tournament for the vacant NWA World Tag Team Championship until almost two years later, holding a one night tournament on April 11, 1995. The tournament was won by The Rock 'n' Roll Express (Ricky Morton and Robert Gibson), defeating the team of Dick Murdoch and Randy Rhodes in the finals.

==== World Wrestling Federation (1998) ====
In 1998 the NWA board of directors reached an agreement with the World Wrestling Federation to feature several of the NWA championships on WWF television as part of an "Invasion" storyline. For the purposes of the storyline the then-champions Pat and C. W. Anderson were stripped of the championship and instead the Rock 'n' Roll Express were named the new champions so they could work with the WWF. The storyline saw WWF wrestler Jeff Jarrett lead a group of "Old School" wrestlers representing the NWA, including Jarrett winning the NWA North American Heavyweight Championship. As part of the storyline the Rock 'n' Roll Express lost the tag team championship to WWF regulars The Headbangers (Mosh and Thrasher) on February 17, 1998, during an episode of Raw is War. The Headbangers later lost the championship to The Midnight Express (Bombastic Bob and Bodacious Bart) as the NWA Invasion angle was being phased out.

On August 14, 1998, the Midnight Express lost the championship to The Border Patrol (Agent Gunn and Agent Maxx), ending the association with the WWF. Over the following years the championship changed hands at various minor shows as well as the NWA 50th Anniversary Show where The Brotherhood (Knuckles Nelson and Erich Sbraccia) won the championship. In 2002 The Shane Twins (Mike and Todd) won the championship from The New Heavenly Bodies (Chris Nelson and Vito DeNucci).

==== Total Nonstop Action (2002–2007) ====
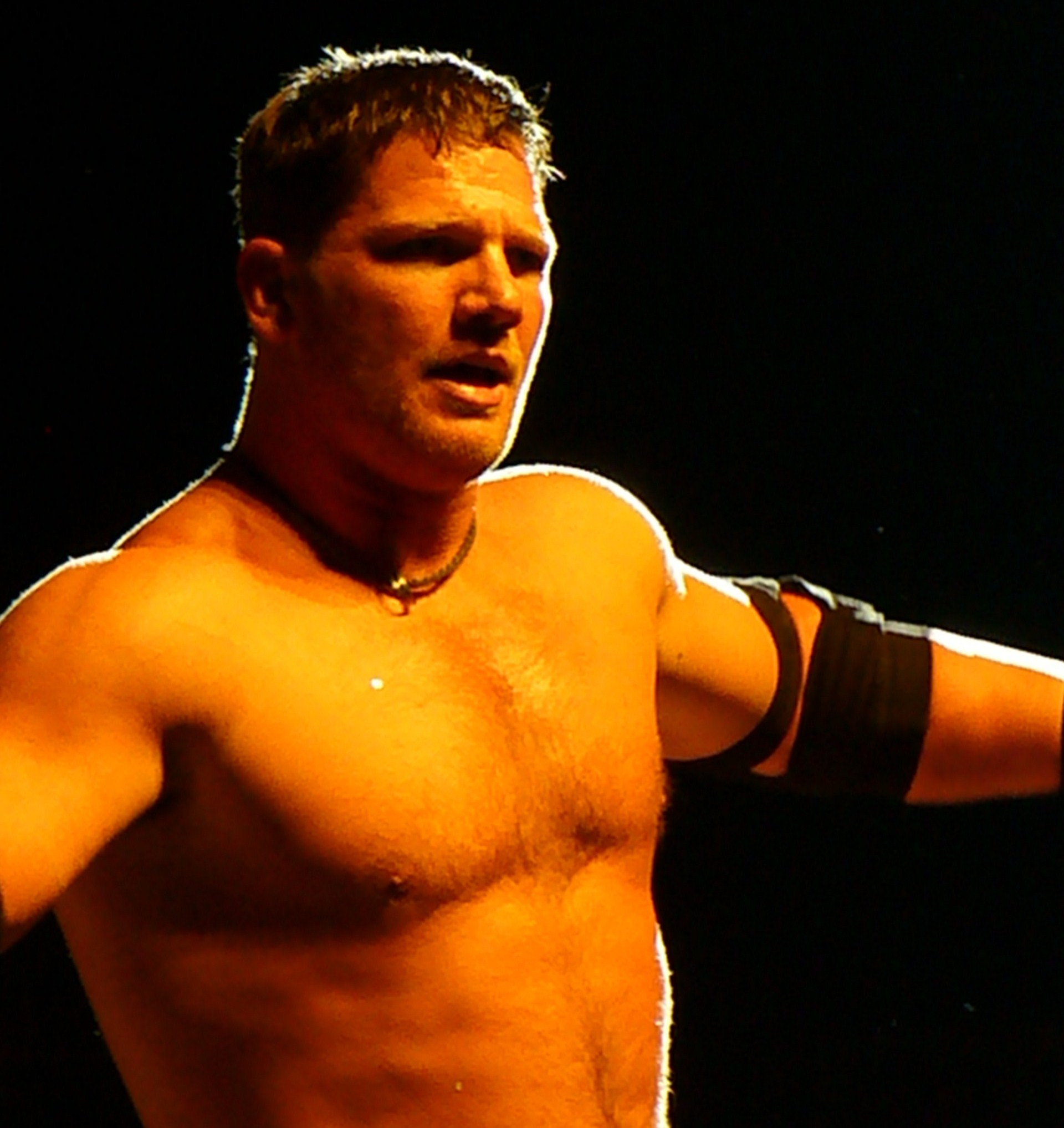
A.J. Styles, half of the first championship team in NWA-TNA.

In early 2002, Jeff Jarrett and his father Jerry Jarrett started a new promotion called NWA Total Nonstop Action (NWA-TNA) based in Nashville. The Jarretts reached an agreement with the NWA board of directors to allow NWA-TNA to control both the singles and tag team versions of the world heavyweight championship. Both championships were vacated to allow NWA-TNA to hold tournaments for the new champions. On July 3, 2002 A.J. Styles and Jerry Lynn defeated The Rainbow Express Bruce and Lenny in the finals of a tournament to win the championship. TNA controlled the championship from 2002 until May 2007, crowning a total of 32 champions in that period of time. At that point the NWA withdrew its recognition of NWA:TNA, which then rebranded itself "Total Nonstop Action Wrestling" and created the TNA World Tag Team Championship.

==== Post TNA (2007–2018) ====
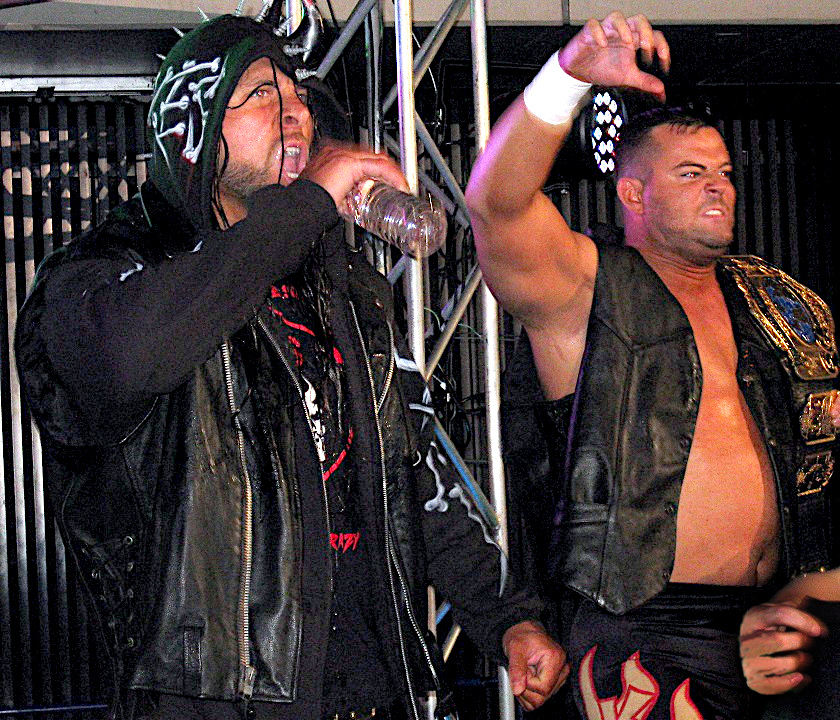
Lance Archer (left) and Davey Boy Smith Jr. (right), held both the NWA and IWGP Tag Team Championship at the same time.

With the championship vacant after the split from TNA, the National Wrestling Alliance arranged a three team tournament to determine the new champions. On July 8, 2007, The Real American Heroes (Karl Anderson and Joey Ryan) defeated the teams of Billy Kidman/Sean Waltman and Incognito/Sicodelico Jr. in a three-way match to win the championship. On October 4, 2008, The Skullcrushers (Rache Brown and Keith Walker) defeated Los Luchas (Phoenix Star and Zokre) to win the championship. This marked the start of a 777 day long reign, the longest in the championships history, lasting until November 20, 2010, where The Skullcrushers were defeated by The Dark City Fight Club (Jon Davis and Kory Chavis.

In 2013 the NWA began working closely together with New Japan Pro-Wrestling (NJPW), co-promoting shows and NJPW hosting several championship matches for both the heavyweight and tag team championships. On April 20, 2013, the Killer Elite Squad (Davey Boy Smith Jr. and Lance Archer) defeated Scott Summers and Ryan Genesis to win the championship, the Killer Elite Squad was also the IWGP Tag Team Champions at the time of the title victory. On November 3, 2013 The IronGodz (Jax Dane and Rob Conway) won the NWA World Tag Team Championship in a special two falls match that saw Tencozy (Hiroyoshi Tenzan and Satoshi Kojima) with the IWGP championship in the other fall. Conway was the reigning NWA World Heavyweight Champion, making him the first person to hold both championships at once. On April 6, 2014, Tencozy defeated the Iron Godz to win the NWA championship and would later lose those to the Killer Elite Squad on October 10, 2014. On October 15, 2015, The Heatseekers (Sigmon and Elliot Russel) won the championship on a show in Dyersburg.

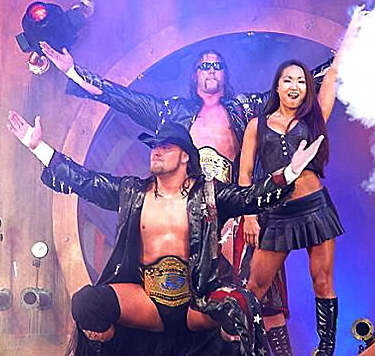
America's Most Wanted (Chris Harris and James Storm) held the championship a record six times.

==== Billy Corgan acquisition (2019–present) ====
On April 27, 2019, the National Wrestling Alliance announced on their Twitter page that the winners of the 2019 Crockett Cup tournament would be awarded the vacated NWA World Tag Team Championship as a reward. Later that night, Villain Enterprises (Brody King and PCO) defeated the wild card team of Royce Isaacs and Thomas Latimer defeated in the finals to win the NWA World Tag Team Championship.

== Reigns ==
There have been 99 total officially recognized title reigns and five "unofficial reigns" from the time WCW controlled the championship. Rasche Brown and Keith Walker, known as the Skullkrushers, hold the record for longest reign, which lasted 777 days before they lost the belts to The Dark City Fight Club. The Skullkrushers, by virtue of such a lengthy run as champions, also hold the record for most cumulative days as champions, 35 days longer than the two reigns of the Dark City Fight Club which totaled 742 days.

America's Most Wanted (James Storm and Chris Harris) are the record holders for most reigns as a team with six. Storm himself also holds the individual record for most reigns as champion with eight, having also won the titles while teaming with Christopher Daniels and Eli Drake; his win with Drake broke a tie with his former partner Harris, who had seven total reigns as champion including a single reign with Elix Skipper as his partner.

The current champions are The Country Gentlemen {AJ Cazana and KC Cazana) who are in their first reign both as a team and individually. The defeated The Immortals (JR Kratos and Odinson) during the NWA Powerrr tapings on April 25, 2026 in Tampa, Florida (aired May 30).

== Tournaments ==
=== 1992 ===
When the National Wrestling Alliance Board of Directors decided to finally endorse a NWA World Tag Team Championship in 1992 they reached out to World Championship Wrestling to organize the initial tournament as well give them the rights to control the championship on a day-to-day basis. WCW pulled together a 16-team tournament that saw seven teams made up of regular WCW competitors as well as teams from various countries such as Japan, Mexico, Canada and more. The eight matches of the first round all took place on June 16, 1992, at WCW's Clash of the Champions XIX. During the show WCW started a storyline feud between WCW's top tag team, the Steiner Brothers, and the favorite non-WCW team of Steve Williams and Terry Gordy, who had been one of the top teams in Japan for years prior to the tournament. During the show Gordy and Williams attacked the Steiners' opponents prior to the match, leading to the Steiners winning by forfeit. During the show the Steiners challenged Gordy and Williams to face them in the second round that night instead of waiting for the next round. In the main event of the Clash of Champions Gordy and Williams defeated the Steiner Brothers to advance to the semi-finals. In the month between the first round and the rest of the tournament Gordy and Williams defeated the Steiner Brothers to win the WCW World Tag Team Championship.

The finals took place at that year's The Great American Bash pay per view on July 12. For the second round Japanese wrestler Shinya Hashimoto replaced Akira Nogami who had been injured after he and Hiroshi Hase had qualified for the quarter-finals. Hase and Hashimoto defeated The Fabulous Freebirds in the quarter-finals only to lose to Dustin Rhodes and Barry Windham in the semi-final. In the other semi-final match Gordy and Williams defeated the team of Nikita Koloff and Ricky Steamboat, followed by Gordy and Williams defeating Rhodes and Windham in the finals to become dual champions.

Round of 16
Ricky Steamboat and Nikita Koloff	W
Joe and Dean Malenko
Jushin Thunder Liger and Brian Pillman	W
Beef Wellington and Chris Benoit
Terry Gordy and Steve Williams	W
Jeff and Larry O'Day
The Steiner Brothers	W
Miguel Perez Jr. and Ricky Santana
Dustin Rhodes and Barry Windham	W
Arn Anderson and Bobby Eaton
Steve Austin and Rick Rude	W
Marcus Alexander Bagwell and Tom Zenk
Hiro Hase and Akira Nogami	W
The Headhunters
Silver King I and Silver King II
The Fabulous Freebirds	W

Quarterfinals
Koloff and Steamboat	W
Liger and Pillman
Gordy and Williams	W
The Steiner Brothers
Rhodes and Windham	W
Austin and Rude
Hase and Shinya Hashimoto	W
The Fabulous Freebirds

Semifinals
Koloff and Steamboat
Gordy and Williams	W
Rhodes and Windham	W
Hase and Hashimoto

Finals
Gordy and Williams	W
Rhodes and Windham

=== April 1995 ===
While the NWA withdrew their recognition of the WCW controlled championship in August 1993 they did not establish new champions until almost two years later, holding a one-night, eight-team tournament on April 11, 1995, in Dallas, Texas. The tournament saw tag team veterans, and former four-time holders of the Mid-Atlantic version of the championship The Rock 'n' Roll Express defeat Dick Murdoch and Randy Rhodes to win the championship.

Quarterfinals
The Rock 'n' Roll Express	W
The Interns
Black Bart and Blue Scorpion	W
Hector and Chavo Guerrero
Greg Valentine and Al Perez	W
Killer Tim Brooks and Hercules
Dick Murdoch and Randy Rhodes	W
Sam Houston and The Masked Marvel

Semifinals
The Rock 'n' Roll Express	W
Hector and Chavo Guerrero
Brooks and Hercules
Murdoch and Rhodes	W

Finals
The Rock 'n' Roll Express	W
Murdoch and Rhodes

=== December 1995 ===
The NWA Board of Directors stripped the Rock 'n' Roll Express of the championship on August 4, 1995, when Ricky Morton was suspended by Smokey Mountain Wrestling and thus was unable to defend the championship. During the fall of 1995 the NWA reached an agreement with their Japanese member, International Wrestling Association of Japan (IWA Japan) to give the Japanese promotion control of the championship. IWA Japan held a multi-week, multi-team round-robin tournament to crown new champions. The finals saw Mr. Gannosuke and Tarzan Goto defeat the team of Cactus Jack and Tiger Jeet Singh to become the eight overall champions. The table below was derived from the results page.

IWA-held NWA World Tag Team Tournament
amse	Points
Cactus Jack & Tiger Jeet Singh	10
Mr. Gannosuke & Tarzan Goto	10
Terry Funk & Keisuke Yamada	8
Headhunters	8
Leatherface & Shoji Nakamaki	8
Terry Gordy & Keizo Matsuda	6
Bogeyman & Freddy Krueger	2
Flying Kid Ichikara & Miguel Perez Jr.	2

=== July 2002 ===
In June 2002 the NWA vacated the tag team championship to allow the newly formed NWA-Total Non-Stop Action (NWA-TNA) to use the championship on their weekly pay-per-view (PPV) shows. NWA-TNA held a four-team tournament, which included the former champions the Shane Twins, albeit working as the masked tag team "The Johnsons".

The tournament was the focal point of NWA-TNA's third weekly PPV and saw America's Most Wanted (AMW) defeat the Johnsons in the first match, followed by The Rainbow Express (Bruce and Lenny) defeated the team of Buff Bagwell and Gran Apolo. Between the first round and the finals it was announced that both Harris and Storm of America's Most Wanted were injured and unable to compete in the final match. NWA-TNA management then announced that A.J. Styles and Jerry Lynn would replace AMW in the last match of the tournament. Styles and Lynn went on to defeat The Rainbow Express to become the first NWA-TNA era NWA World Tag Team Champions

Semifinals		Finals
America's Most Wanted (Chris Harris and James Storm)	W
The Johnsons (Dick and Rod Johnson)	04:42	A.J. Styles and Jerry Lynn	W
The Rainbow Express (Bruce and Lenny)	W	The Rainbow Express	12:23
Buff Bagwell and Gran Apolo	05:49

=== September 2002 ===
During the 9th weekly TNA PPV show on August 14, 2002, then-champions A.J. Styles and Jerry Lynn defended the championship against the team of Jeff Jarrett and Ron Killings. The match ended with Jarrett pinning Lynn while Styles pinned Killings, which lead to the championship being held up due to the inconclusive outcome of the match. On September 18 NWA-TNA held a tournament to determine new champions. The tournament had two stages, first a Gauntlet for the Gold, multi-man elimination match, with the final two competitors moving to the finals along with their respective tag team partners. The Gauntlet for the Gold was won by Brian Lee and Chris Harris. Immediately after the match Harris and partner James Storm (America's Most Wanted) defeated Brian Lee and his chosen partner Ron Harris to win the championship.

Gauntlet eliminations

#	Eliminated	By
1	Derek Wylde	Brian Lawler
2	Joel Maximo	Brian Lawler
3	James Storm	Brian Lawler
4	Kobain	Syxx-Pac
5	Ace Steel	Syxx-Pac
6	Jorge Estrada	Brian Lee and Ron Harris
7	CM Punk	Ron Harris
8	Jimmy Rave	Brian Lee
9	Buff Bagwell	Brian Lee and Ron Harris
10	Brian Lawler	Syxx-Pac
11	Jose Maximo	Ron Harris
12	Syxx-Pac	Brian Lee and Ron Harris
13	Ron Harris	Scott Hall
14	Slash	Scott Hall
15	Sonny Siaki	Disco Inferno
16	Disco Inferno	Scott Hall
17	BG James	Brian Lee
18	Scott Hall	Brian Lee
19	Winners	Brian Lee and Chris Harris

=== 2004 ===
On February 4, 2004, A.J. Styles was scheduled to team with Abyss to wrestle then-champions The Red-Shirt Security (Kevin Northcutt and Joe Legend) for the belts. The two were storyline rivals that were forced to team up. On the night the storyline was that Abyss did not show up for the match, but Styels managed to defeat Northcutt and Legend to win the championship. Three weeks later Abyss defeated A.J. Styles to gain full control of the championship. A couple of weeks later the championship was vacated because Abyss did not defend them, nor did he chose a new partner.

Over the following weeks NWA-TNA held an eight-team tournament to crown new champions. Triple X (Christopher Daniels and Low-Ki) earned their way to the finals by defeating The New Franchise (Michael Shane and Shane Douglas) in the first round and The Naturals (Andy Douglas and Chase Stevens) in the semi-finals. The team of Dallas and Kid Kash qualified for the finals with victories over the team of Simon Diamond and Sonny Siaki and then defeated The Disciples of the New Church (Sinn and Slash). In the finals Dallas and Kash defeated Triple X to win the NWA World Tag Team Championship for the first time.

Quarterfinals
Triple X (Christopher Daniels and Low-Ki)	W
The New Franchise (Michael Shane and Shane Douglas)
The Naturals (Andy Douglas and Chase Stevens)	W
3Live Kru (BG James and Konnan)
Dallas and Kid Kash	W
Simon Diamond and Sonny Siaki
The Disciples of the New Church (Sinn and Slash)	W
David Young and Glen Gilberti

Semifinals
Triple X	W
The Naturals
Dallas and Kid Kash	W
The Disciples Of The New Church

Finals
Triple X
Dallas and Kid Kash	W

=== 2019 Crockett Cup ===
In October 2018, during the NWA 70th Anniversary Show, it was announced that the Crockett Cup would be returning in 2019.[8] It was later revealed that the event would take place on April 27, 2019, at Cabarrus Arena in Concord, North Carolina. The event was co-produced by the NWA and Ring of Honor (ROH).[1]

At the NWA New Years Clash, The War Kings (Crimson and Jax Dane) (with Road Warrior Animal) defeated Caleb Konley and Jay Bradley to become the first team to qualify for the 2019 Crockett Cup.[10] From January 24 to January 26, 2019, Ring of Honor held a 12-team Tag Wars tournament as part of their Road To G1 Supercard tour of Texas. Villain Enterprises (Brody King and PCO) won the three-day tournament by defeating The Kingdom (Vinny Marseglia and TK O'Ryan) in the first round, The Bouncers (Brian Milonas and Beer City Bruiser) and the team of Kenny King and MVP in the second round, and Lifeblood (Juice Robinson and David Finlay) in the finals to earn a spot in the Crockett Cup as well as a match for the ROH World Tag Team Championship.[11] On February 8, 2019, it was announced that ROH partner promotions Consejo Mundial de Lucha Libre (CMLL) out of Mexico, and New Japan Pro-Wrestling (NJPW) from Japan would also be sending teams for the 2019 Crockett Cup.[12][10]

Quarterfinals
The Briscoe Brothers (Jay Briscoe and Mark Briscoe)	W
The Rock 'n' Roll Express (Ricky Morton and Robert Gibson)
Satoshi Kojima and Yuji Nagata
Villain Enterprises (Brody King and PCO)	W
Flip Gordon and Bandido	W
Guerrero Maya Jr. and Stuka Jr.
The War Kings (Crimson and Jax Dane)
Royce Isaacs and Thomas Latimer	W

Semifinals
Briscoe Brothers
Villain Enterprises	W
Gordon and Bandido
Isaacs and Latimer	W

Finals
Villain Enterprises	W
Isaacs and Latimer

== See also ==
- List of National Wrestling Alliance championships
