= AWA Midwest Tag Team Championship =

Professional wrestling championship

Details
- Promotion: American Wrestling Association
- Date established: October 15, 1966
- Date retired: May 9, 1972
Statistics
- First champion(s): Luke Brown and Jake Smith
- Most reigns: (As a tag team) Doug Gilbert and Reggie Parks and Reggie Parks and Stan Pulaski (3 times) (As individual) Reggie Parks and Stan Pulaski (7 Times)
- Longest reign: Luke Brown and Jake Smith (151 days)
- Shortest reign: Bob Orton and Mad Dog Vachon, Jerry Miller and Johnny Valentine, Jr (7 days)

The AWA Midwest Tag Team Championship was a title in the American Wrestling Association from 1967 until 1971. It was for mid-level wrestlers and was mostly defended in the Omaha, Nebraska area.

== Title history ==
Key
No.	Overall reign number
Reign	Reign number for the specific champion
Days	Number of days held
(NLT)	Championship change took place "no later than" the date listed

No.	Champion	Championship change			Reign statistics		Notes	Ref.
No.	Champion	Date	Event	Location	Reign	Days	Notes	Ref.
1	Dale Lewis and Stan Pulaski	May 28, 1966 (NLT)	House show	(Note: The location of the championship match has not been found in available documentation.)	1	(Note: The date the championship was won or lost is uncertain, which means that the reign lasted between 1 and 140 days, possibly more.)		
2	Kentuckians (Luke Brown and Jake Smith)	October 15, 1966 (NLT)	House show		1	(Note: The date the championship was won or lost is uncertain, which means that the reign lasted between 1 and −139 days.)	Still champions on November 5, 1966.	
Championship history is unrecorded from October 15, 1966 to January 29, 1967.
4	Francis St. Claire and Dale Lewis (2)	March 17, 1967	House show	Omaha, Nebraska	1	(Note: The date the championship was won or lost is uncertain, which means that the reign lasted between 1 and 148 days.)		
—	Vacated	1967	—	—	—	—	Championship vacated for undocumented reasons	
5	Doug Gilbert (Note: This was a wrestler also known as Doug Lindzy, not Doug Gilbert) and Reggie Parks	August 12, 1967	House show	Omaha, Nebraska	1	56	Defeated Mitsu Arakawa and Dale Lewis.	
6	Mike DiBiase and Bob Orton	October 7, 1967	House show		1	(Note: The date the championship was won or lost is uncertain, which means that the reign lasted between 1 and 54 days.)		
7	Doug Gilbert (2) and Reggie Parks (2)	November 1967 (NLT)	House show		2	(Note: The date the championship was won or lost is uncertain, which means that the reign lasted between 106 and 159 days.)		
8	Bob Orton (2) and Mad Dog Vachon	March 15, 1968	House show	Omaha, Nebraska	1	7		
9	Doug Gilbert (3) and Reggie Parks (3)	March 22, 1968	House show	Omaha, Nebraska	3	1		
10	Bob Orton (3) and Mad Dog Vachon (2)	March 23, 1968	House show		2	21		
11	Dale Lewis (3) and Stan Pulaski (2)	April 13, 1968	House show	Omaha, Nebraska	2	(Note: The date the championship was won or lost is uncertain, which means that the reign lasted between 1 and 105 days.)		
12	The Avenger and Mike DiBiase (2)	July 27, 1968 (NLT)	House show		1	(Note: The date the championship was won or lost is uncertain, which means that the reign lasted between 77 and −104 days.)	align=	
13	Woody Farmer and Reggie Parks (4)	October 12, 1968	House show		1	(Note: The date the championship was won or lost is uncertain, which means that the reign lasted between 1 and 91 days.)		
Championship history is unrecorded from October 12, 1968 to January 11, 1969.
15	Stan Pulaski (3) and Chris Tolos	January 25, 1969	House show	Omaha, Nebraska	1	168		
16	Bob Geigel and The Viking	July 12, 1969	House show	Omaha, Nebraska	1	0		
17	Bob Ellis and Stan Pulaski (4)	July 12, 1969	House show	Omaha, Nebraska	1	(Note: The date the championship was won or lost is uncertain, which means that the reign lasted between 1 and 125 days.)		
—	Vacated	1969	—	—	—	—	Championship vacated for undocumented reasons	
18	Reggie Parks (5) and Stan Pulaski (5)	November 15, 1969	House show	Omaha, Nebraska	1	(Note: The date the championship was won or lost is uncertain, which means that the reign lasted between 412 and 454 days.)	Defeated Ali Ben Khan and The Great Kimura in a tournament final.	
19	The Claw and Rock Rogowski	1971	House show		1	(Note: The date the championship was won or lost is uncertain, which means that the reign lasted between 1 and −3,610 days.)	After January 30, 1971.	
20	Reggie Parks (6) and Stan Pulaski (6)	February 13, 1971	House show	Omaha, Nebraska	2	18		
21	Ox Baker and Rock Rogowski (2)	March 3, 1971	House show	Omaha, Nebraska	1	52		
22	Bob Ellis (2) and Alberto Torres	April 24, 1971	House show	Omaha, Nebraska	1	53		
—	Vacated	June 16, 1971	—	—	—	—	Torres died due to injuries suffered three days earlier during a match against Ox Baker and The Claw	
23	Johnny Valentine Jr. and Jerry Miller	August 11, 1971	House show	Creighton, Nebraska	1	59	Defeated Ox Baker and The Claw	
24	Ox Baker (3) and The Great Kusatsu	October 9, 1971	House show		1	7		
25	Johnny Valentine Jr. and Jerry Miller	October 16, 1971	House show		2	63		
26	Lars Anderson and Larry Hennig	December 18, 1971	House show	Omaha, Nebraska	1	21		
27	Reggie Parks (7) and Stan Pulaski (7)	January 8, 1972	House show	Omaha, Nebraska	3	(Note: The date the championship was won or lost is uncertain, which means that the reign lasted between 1 and 358 days.)	Still champions on May 9, 1972.	
—	Deactivated	1972	—	—	—	—		

== See also ==
- American Wrestling Association
