= Reggie Parks =

Canadian professional wrestler and engraver (1934–2021)

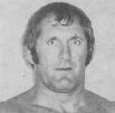
- Parks, c. 1982

Personal information
- Born: August 27, 1934 Edmonton, Alberta, Canada
- Died: October 7, 2021 (aged 87) Tucson, Arizona, U.S.
- Cause of death: COVID-19

Professional wrestling career
- Trained by: Stu Hart
- Debut: December 26, 1955
- Retired: 1982

Reggie Parks (born Reginald David Parko; August 27, 1934 – October 7, 2021) was a Canadian professional wrestler and engraver, known for his work designing championship belts for wrestling, mixed martial arts, and boxing promotions. He began his wrestling career under the tutelage of trainer Stu Hart, and wrestled throughout the United States, becoming known for his physique and his "Quiet Superman" demeanour. Parks branched out into belt design after first creating a championship for wrestling promoter Joe Dusek while working in Nebraska.

As a designer, Parks earned the nickname "the King of Belts" for his work. He is known for the "Winged Eagle" belt he created for the then-WWF in the 1980s; he also contributed work to other wrestling promotions, as well as to the UFC and for an album cover by Madonna.

== Early life ==
Reggie Parks was born in Edmonton, Alberta, Canada, on August 27, 1934. He was the youngest of four brothers. Parks grew up on a farm outside the city, and played hockey as a youth, abandoning it when his family moved into the city proper. He began weightlifting at age 13, and started working as a ticket usher for professional wrestling shows shortly afterward. As a wrestling fan, he admired the brothers George and Sandy Scott, and Tiny Mills.

== Career ==
=== Professional wrestling ===
Parks began his career training at a boxing club in Edmonton, where he met Stampede Wrestling promoter Stu Hart in 1955. Hart trained Parks and introduced him to wrestling territories in the United States, leading to Parks wrestling in Seattle, Los Angeles, and throughout Texas. Early in his career, Parks wrestled with a traveling carnival, competing in legitimate, unscripted matches with audience challengers and relying on his stamina and conditioning to out-wrestle them. Between 1963 and 1973, Parks was based with the American Wrestling Association, also making appearances for territories in Nebraska. Parks became known for his impressive physique and feats of strength, being billed as the "Quiet Superman"; at one point Parks had a Volkswagen Beetle driven over his stomach to prove his strength. According to Greg Oliver, Park at his prime was 6 feet 2 inches (188 cm) tall and weighed 225–230 pounds (102–104 kg), with 17 in (43 cm) biceps and a 50 in (130 cm) chest.

Parks also wrestled under a mask for a time as The Avenger during his later career. While working in Joe Blanchard's Texas territory in 1968, Parks was the opponent for the debut match of future NWA Worlds Heavyweight Champion Dusty Rhodes. After a stint working as a referee due to a back injury, he wrestled his last match in 1999, facing off with Jose Lothario in New Mexico. Parks wrestled most of his career as a fan-friendly babyface, crediting his likability to his Canadian upbringing: "It's just a natural Canadian thing. I was always nice".

=== Belt designing ===
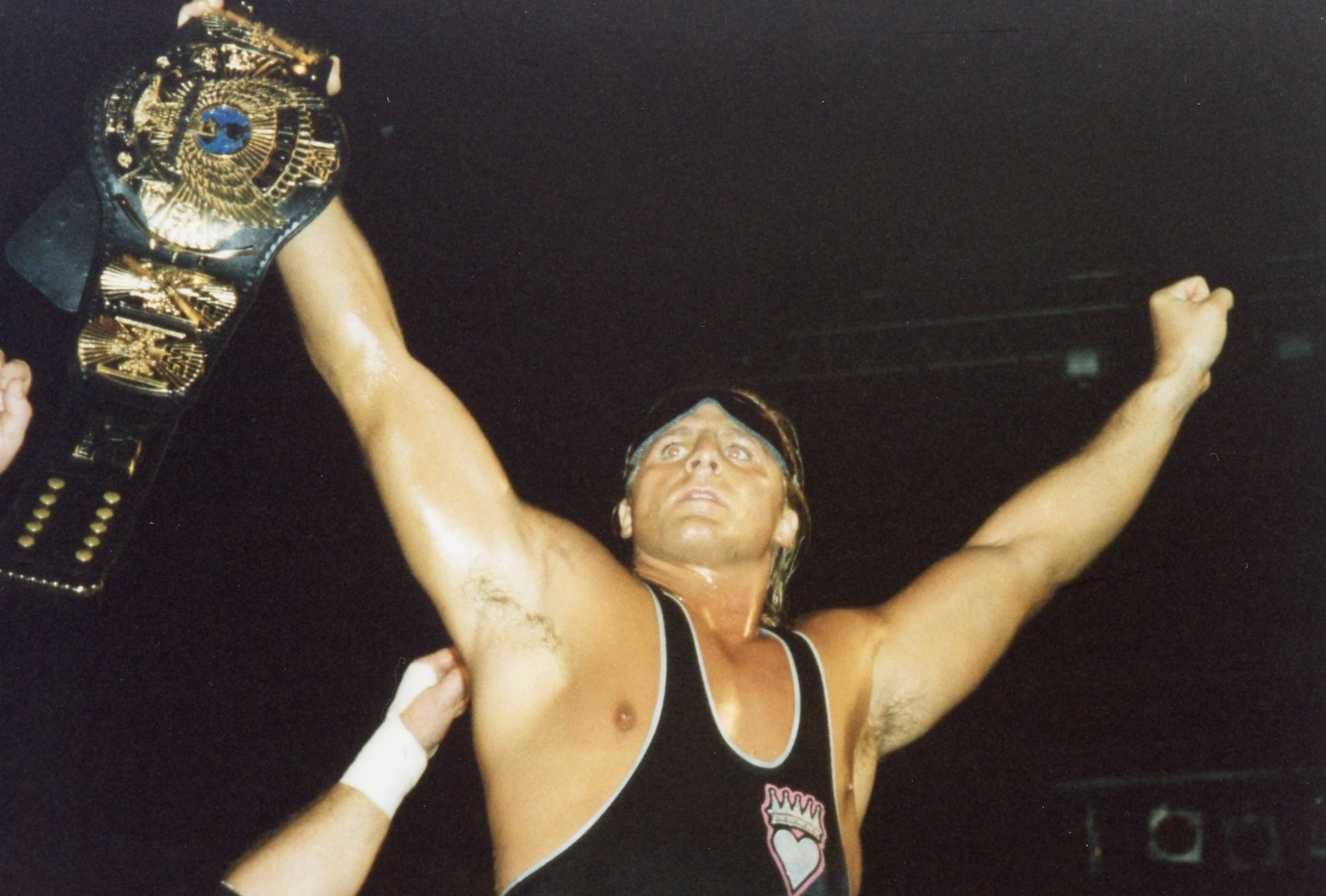
The "Winged Eagle" design of the WWF Championship, pictured here being held by Owen Hart, was designed by Reggie Parks.

Parks was known for designing and engraving championship belts for WWE, the National Wrestling Alliance, World Championship Wrestling, the American Wrestling Association, and Shimmer Women Athletes. His design work earned him the nickname "the King of Belts". WWE described his belt designs as some of its most famous. His most well-known were the "Winged Eagle" belt used to represent the WWF Championship in the 1980s and 1990s and the WWF Intercontinental Heavyweight Championship belt from the same era.

Parks began to create belts in 1962 while working in Omaha, Nebraska, after noticing that promoter Joe Dusek had been using a large trophy to represent a championship, which was beginning to fall apart. He made a replacement belt using plated copper and a leather strap, estimating that it cost him around $75. Parks was soon commissioned to make championship belts for the American Wrestling Association's tag team champions Harley Race and Larry Hennig after the team noticed his craftsmanship during a match against Parks; this and the visibility of a subsequent tour of Japanese wrestling promotions expanded his business significantly. His work was then sought out by other wrestling organizations, as well as appearing in taekwondo and boxing associations, the UFC and on the cover of Madonna's Hard Candy album. Parks' belts were typically created by photoengraving onto a zinc base which was then plated in nickel or gold; the finished design was accented with additional gemstones and tooled leather designs.

== Personal life ==
After retiring from professional wrestling, Parks resided in Arizona, running a carpet-cleaning company in addition to his work designing belts; he had been introduced to the carpet-cleaning industry by fellow wrestling personality Gordon Solie.

Parks was married once, and divorced; he lived with his partner Trish for 22 years before her death in 2006. He had no children.

Parks died from COVID-19 in Tucson, Arizona, on October 7, 2021, at age 87. Speaking on his legacy, fellow belt-maker Dave Millican said "[we] all owe Reggie a huge debt of gratitude because nobody did this this way before he did. Were there belts before Reggie? Absolutely. Were there good belts before Reggie? There weren't".

== Championships and accomplishments ==
- American Wrestling Association
  - AWA Midwest Tag Team Championship (8 times) - with Eric Pomeroy (4), Doug Gashouse Gilbert (2), Tim Woods (1) and Woody Farmer (1)
  - Nebraska Tag Team Championship (1 time) - with Danny Hodge
- Central States Wrestling
  - NWA Central States Heavyweight Championship (1 time)
- NWA San Francisco
  - NWA World Tag Team Championship (San Francisco version) (2 times) - with Enrique Torres (2 times)
- Western States Sports
  - NWA Western States Tag Team Championship (1 time) - with Scott Casey
  - NWA International Heavyweight Championship (Amarillo version) (1 time)

== Footnotes ==
=== References ===
- Rhodes, Dusty & Brody, Howard (2005). Dusty: Reflections of an American Dream. Champaign, Illinois: Sports Publishing LLC. ISBN 1-58261-907-7.
