= Von Stroheims =

Professional wrestling stable

Tag team
- Members: Kurt Von Stroheim; Karl von Stroheim
- Billed from: Germany
- Debut: 1960
- Disbanded: 1967

The Von Stroheims were a professional wrestling tag team who wrestled from 1960 to 1967. The team consisted of Karl Von Stroheim and Kurt von Stroheim. The team portrayed German villains.

== Professional wrestling career ==
The Von Stroheims started teaming together in 1960. They began wrestling in Detroit and were billed as brothers even though they were actually cousins. As common with German themed villainous wrestlers such as the Von Brauners and Kurt Von Hess, they shaved their heads, had mustaches and wore black. The team started off wrestling in Detroit under Bert Ruby. They wrestled in multiple territories including Hawaii, Central States Wrestling, NWA Mid-America, Jim Crockett Promotions, Championship Wrestling from Florida, amongst others. The team won the NWA Southern Tag Team Championship on May 13, 1963, lost the titles and won them back on January 16, 1964. The team won the NWA International Tag Team Championship in July 1964 and lost the titles within the same month. The team won the WWA Tag Team Championship in February 1965. The team won the NWA Florida World Tag Team Championship on October 23, 1965, and won the titles again on September 5, 1967. The team then captured the IWA World Tag Team Championship in June 1967 and the team broke-up permanently two months later.

== Personal lives ==
=== Karl von Stroheim ===
Walter Nurnberg was born in Canada in 1929. He was of German ancestry. He was a minor league hockey player, but an ankle injury ended his career. He began his wrestling career by 1959. After the Von Stroheim's split up in 1967, he continued wrestling in NWA Tri-State, Arizona, NWA Mid-America as "Dr. Death #1" the WWWF as Joe Cox, Championship Wrestling from Florida and Gulf Coast Championship Wrestling as "The Untouchable #1". Nurnberg retired in the 1980s and later delivered mattresses. He died on August 13, 2006.

=== Kurt von Stroheim ===
Willy Rutkowski was born in Germany in 1923. He was wrestling in Germany by 1956 under the name, "Johnny Stein". He met up with Nurnberg in 1960 in Detroit to form the Von Stroheims. He earned a shot at Dory Funk Jr's NWA Worlds Heavyweight Championship in on March 4, 1969. After the Von Stroheim's broke up in 1967, he wrestled as a singles wrestler and later became the second Kurt Von Brauner. He wrestled until he was 62. After wrestling, he became a termite carpenter. He died on February 17, 1993.

== Championships and accomplishments ==
- American Wrestling Association
  - AWA Southern Tag Team Championship
- Championship Wrestling from Florida
  - NWA Florida World Tag Team Championship
- NWA Hollywood Wrestling
  - WWA Tag Team Championship
- Japan Pro Wrestling Alliance
  - NWA International Tag Team Championship
- World Championship Wrestling
  - IWA World Tag Team Championship
