= Don Curtis =

American professional wrestler (1927–2008)

Personal information
- Born: Donald Beitelman; May 22, 1927 Buffalo, New York, U.S.
- Died: March 6, 2008 (aged 80) Jacksonville, Florida, U.S.
- Education: University at Buffalo

Professional wrestling career
- Ring name(s): Don Curtis; The Buffalo Bomber
- Billed height: 6 ft 1 in (185 cm)
- Billed weight: 190 lb (86 kg)
- Trained by: Lou Thesz
- Debut: 1951
- Retired: 1981

Donald B. Curtis (born Donald Beitelman) (May 22, 1927 – March 6, 2008) was an American professional wrestler, best known for being a member of a tag team with Mark Lewin in the 1950s and 1960s. During his partnership with Lewin, they won the NWA World Tag Team Championship. Curtis also worked for Championship Wrestling from Florida as a promoter of Jacksonville, Florida cards until 1981.

== Professional wrestling career ==
Beitelman decided to become a professional wrestler in 1951, after working out with Lou Thesz. During his early career, he worked in Canada, New Zealand, and Australia, appearing as "Don Curtis."

In 1958 promoter Eddie Graham teamed Curtis with Mark Lewin. Curtis and Lewin held the NWA United States Tag Team Championship (Northeast version) twice in 1958, trading it with Graham and his "brother" Jerry.

Curtis teamed up with Graham in May 1960 to win the NWA Southern Tag Team Championship (Florida version). He held the title with Joe Scarpa in October 1962; Cowboy Bob Ellis in March 1964; and Jose Lothario in March 1967.

In 1962, Curtis moved to Florida and teamed with Joe Scarpa to win the NWA World Tag Team Championship (Florida version) from Kurt and Karl Von Brauner. In January 1963, he won the title with Lewin from The Fabulous Kangaroos (Al Costello and Roy Heffernan). After vacating the title, Curtis and Lewin regained it in December from the Assassins. Lewin left the team the following month, and the title was once again vacated. In May 1964, Curtis teamed with Abe Jacobs to hold the title for the last time. In Jacksonville, Florida, Curtis promoted shows and managed the coliseum.

In November 1969, he won the NWA Brass Knuckles Championship (Florida version).

By the mid 1970s, he wrestled only part time until his last match in 1980.

== Personal life and death ==
Curtis attended the University at Buffalo, where he played football and was an amateur wrestler. He was the wrestling team captain during 1949 and 1950.

Upon retiring from professional wrestling, Curtis worked in real estate and managed the Jacksonville Coliseum. In 1980, he was inducted into the University of Buffalo Athletic Hall of Fame for his accomplishments in wrestling and football.

On February 26, 2008, Curtis suffered a "massive stroke", and his wife, Dotty, released a statement that it was "due to a blood clot breaking loose and hitting the left side of his brain." He was admitted into the Mayo Clinic Hospice facility that day, and died on March 6, 2008, at the age of 80. In 2009, Curtis was posthumously inducted into the Professional Wrestling Hall of Fame and Museum along with former partner Mark Lewin in the tag team wing.

== Championships and accomplishments ==
- Capitol Wrestling Corporation
  - NWA United States Television Championship (1 time)
  - NWA United States Tag Team Championship (Northeast version) (2 times, inaugural) - with Mark Lewin
- Cauliflower Alley Club
  - Other honoree (1997)
- Championship Wrestling from Florida
  - NWA Brass Knuckles Championship (Florida version) - (1 time)
  - NWA Southern Tag Team Championship (Florida version) (3 times) with Eddie Graham (1), “Cowboy” Bob Ellis (1) and Jose Lothario (1)
  - NWA World Tag Team Championship (Florida version) (4 times) - with Mark Lewin (2), Joe Scarpa (1) and Abe Jacobs (1)
- Georgia Championship Wrestling
  - NWA World Tag Team Championship (Georgia version) - (1 time) - with Joe Scarpa
- George Tragos/Lou Thesz Professional Wrestling Hall of Fame
  - Class of 2012
- Professional Wrestling Hall of Fame and Museum
  - Class of 2009 (Tag Team) - with Mark Lewin

== See also ==
- List of professional wrestling promoters
