= Doug Gashouse Gilbert =

American professional wrestler (1937–2013)

Doug Gilbert
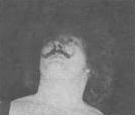

Personal information
- Born: Doug Allan Lindzy; 1937 Mishawaka, Indiana, U.S.
- Died: November 4, 2013 (aged 76) Omaha, Nebraska, U.S.
- Spouse: Kay Noble

Professional wrestling career
- Ring name(s): Doug Gilbert; Gashouse Gilbert; Mr. Low; Redbeard; Destroyer; The Professional
- Billed height: 6 ft 1 in (185 cm)
- Billed weight: 275 lb (125 kg)
- Debut: 1958
- Retired: 1986

Douglas Allan Lindzy (1937 – November 4, 2013) was an American professional wrestler who was best known as Doug Gilbert or Gashouse Gilbert in various territories including American Wrestling Association, Georgia Championship Wrestling, and the World Wide Wrestling Federation.

== Professional wrestling career ==
Made his wrestling debut in Chicago in 1958. In 1961, Gilbert would make his debut in Minnesota for American Wrestling Association. In 1962, Gilbert teamed with Dick Steinborn as Mr. High and Mr. Low and won the tag team titles. In 1963 they broke up and Gilbert stayed in AWA until 1968.

After AWA, Gilbert made his debut for Georgia Championship Wrestling. From 1968 to 1973, Gilbert was a six-time NWA Georgia Tag Team Champion.

In 1972, he worked for Championship Wrestling From Florida as Redbeard and won their version of the tag team titles with football player Mike Webster.

In 1975, he worked for New Japan Pro Wrestling as the Professional.

From 1975 to 1976 he worked for Jim Crockett Promotions in the Carolinas.

In 1976, Gilbert wrestled for the World Wide Wrestling Federation (WWWF), including a match against US Champion Bobo Brazil at Madison Square Garden. Gilbert left the WWWF in 1977.

In 1978, he won the NWA Central States Heavyweight Championship where he defeated Bob Sweetan. He dropped the title to Buck Robley.

Gilbert returned to the AWA in 1978 and worked there until 1979.

Gilbert made a couple of appearances for the World Wrestling Federation in 1985 and 1986.

== Personal life ==
Gilbert was forced to retire from wrestling due to a motorcycle accident.

He was first married to wrestler Kay Noble whom he met in an elevator and married in 1959. The couple had three children: Teresa, Michael, and Steve. At this time they lived in North Branch, Minnesota where the children started school in ISD 138. Later they bought a home in South Bend, Indiana, where they also owned horses. They later got divorced.

== Death ==
Gilbert died on November 4, 2013, from Alzheimer's Disease in Omaha, Nebraska.

== Championships and accomplishments ==
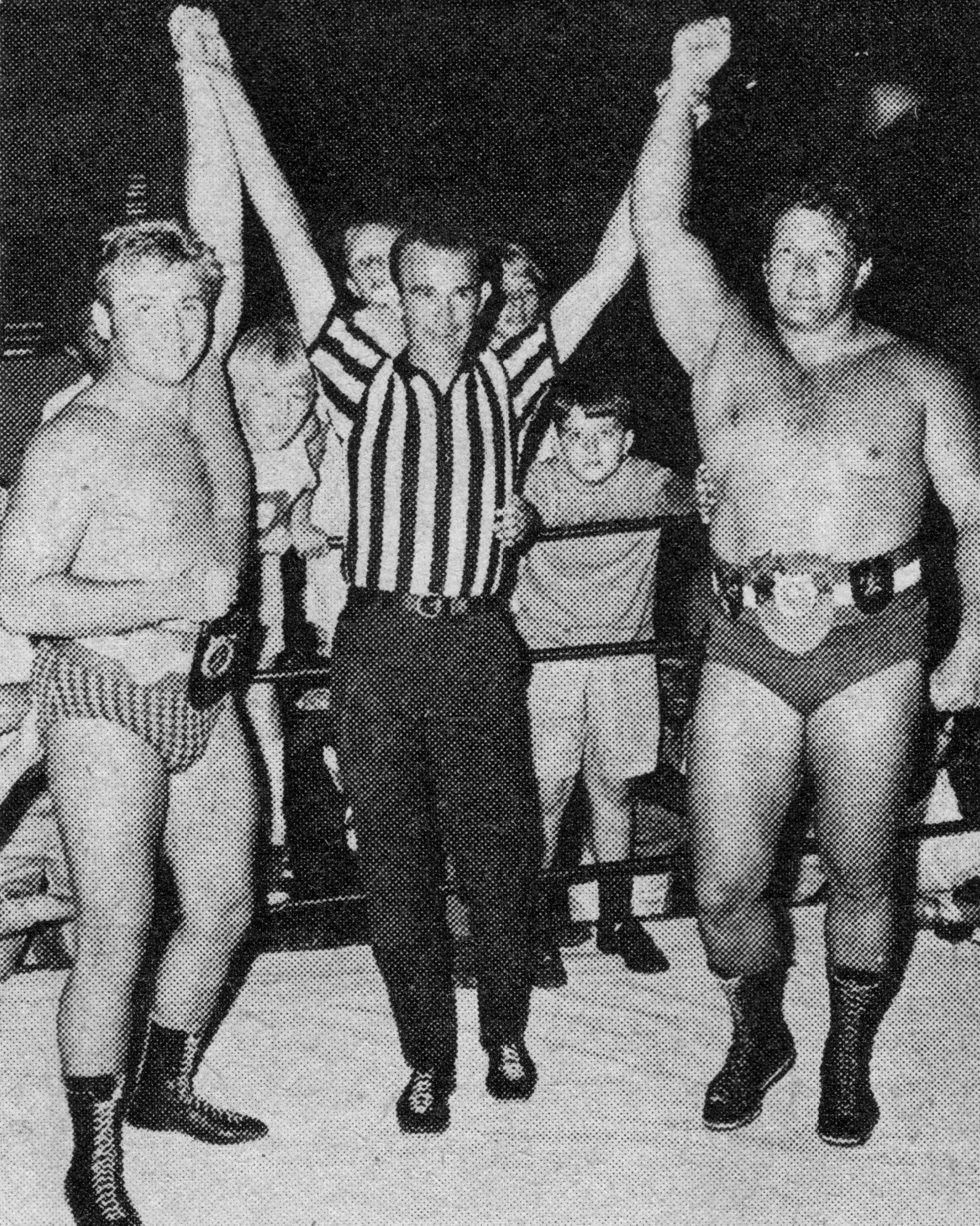
Gilbert (right) and Bobby Shane wearing tag team championship belts

- American Wrestling Association
  - AWA Midwest Tag Team Championship (2 times) - with Reggie Parks (2)
  - AWA World Tag Team Championship (1 time) - with Dick Steinborn (1)
- Central States Wrestling
  - NWA Central States Heavyweight Championship (1 time)
  - NWA North American Tag Team Championship (Central States version) (2 times) – with Buddy Colt
- Championship Wrestling from Florida
  - NWA Florida Tag Team Championship (1 time) – with Mike Webster
- Georgia Championship Wrestling
  - NWA Georgia Heavyweight Championship (4 times)
  - NWA Georgia Tag Team Championship (6 times) – with Assassin #2 (1), El Mongol (1), Bobby Shane (2) and Super Inferno #2 (2)
  - NWA Macon Tag Team Championship (2 times) – with Super Inferno #2 (2)
  - NWA Southeastern Tag Team Championship (Georgia version) (2 times) - with Super Inferno #2 (2)
- NWA Hollywood Wrestling
  - NWA "Beat the Champ" Television Championship (1 time)
