= Don Leo Jonathan =

American-Canadian professional wrestler (1931–2018)

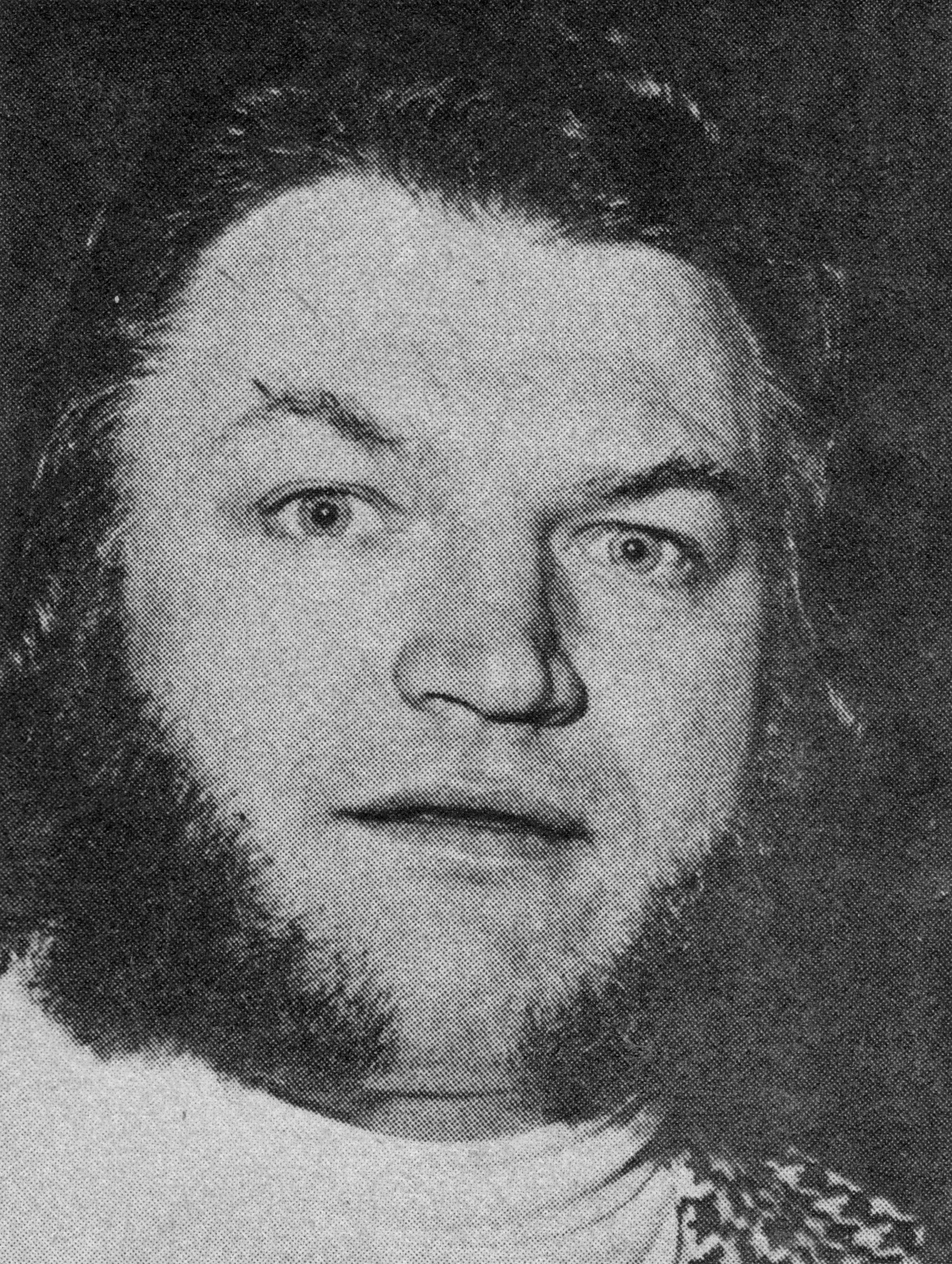

Personal information
- Born: Don Heaton; April 29, 1931 Hurricane, Utah, U.S.
- Died: October 13, 2018 (aged 87) Langley, British Columbia, Canada

Professional wrestling career
- Ring name(s): Don Leo Jonathan; The Mormon Giant; Sonny Jonathan
- Billed height: 6 ft 6 in (198 cm)
- Billed weight: 285–340 lb (129–154 kg)
- Billed from: Salt Lake City, Utah
- Trained by: Brother Jonathan
- Debut: 1949
- Retired: 1980

Don Heaton (April 29, 1931 – October 13, 2018), also known as Don Leo Jonathan, was an American-Canadian professional wrestler.

== Professional wrestling career ==
Jonathan, nicknamed "The Mormon Giant" was a second generation star (his father was former wrestler Brother Jonathan) who made his professional wrestling debut after World War II. Over the course of his career, he competed around the world, making stops in Europe, South Africa, Australia and Japan; he wrestled more often, however, in the United States and Canada. His first championship wins occurred in Montreal with Canadian Athletic Promotions, where he twice captured their World Heavyweight title in 1955.

Elsewhere in Canada, Jonathan found more success competing in Toronto's National Wrestling Alliance (NWA) affiliate Maple Leaf Wrestling (where he first teamed with Gene Kiniski to win the Canadian Open Tag Team title, in 1959) and in Winnipeg, where he wrestled for NWA member Alex Turk Promotions (twice winning their International Tag Team title) and for the American Wrestling Association. Jonathan also got a taste of World heavyweight gold again when he won the AWA-affiliated Omaha territory's version of the World title three times in 1961.

Canada eventually became home to Jonathan in the early 1960s as he settled in the Vancouver suburb of Langley. Making Vancouver his home base, he competed frequently for NWA All Star Wrestling, winning five Pacific Coast Heavyweight titles between 1970 and 1977, the NWA World Tag Team title (with Dominic DeNucci) in 1966, and a record 18 Canadian Tag Team titles between 1964 and 1978, as well as challenging for the NWA World Heavyweight Championship against such titleholders as Kiniski, Dory Funk, Jr. and Jack Brisco; he also engaged in feuds with Kiniski and Dutch Savage in All Star, as well as teaming with them.

On May 31, 1972, in what was billed as the "match of the century," Jonathan defeated Le Géant Jean Ferré (André the Giant) by disqualification. On September 7, 1972, in a match which was billed as the "Battle of the Giants" Jonathan had a rematch against André, this time losing by disqualification. Jonathan would make his debut in Japan in 1972, working for International Wrestling Enterprise. He later worked for All Japan Pro Wrestling from 1973 to 1978. In 1973 he wrestled in the WWWF and fought Pedro Morales for the championship as a heel. A year alter in 1974 he fought Bruno Sammartino for the championship. Late in his career, he appeared as one of the wrestlers in the 1978 Sylvester Stallone movie Paradise Alley.

Jonathan teamed with André the Giant and Roddy Piper to defeat The Sheepherders and Buddy Rose in Vancouver on March 10, 1980, His final match was a loss to Otto Wanz in Graz, Austria on July 12, 1980 before retiring from the ring that year.

On November 5, 2005, he appeared at an event in Surrey, British Columbia, presented by Top Ranked Wrestling (prior to its purchase by NWA: Extreme Canadian Championship Wrestling) to be honored in a special ceremony for his contributions to the sport. On May 20, 2006, he was inducted into the Professional Wrestling Hall of Fame in Amsterdam, New York.

== Personal life ==
Jonathan was born in Hurricane, Utah and raised as a Mormon. His father was professional wrestler Jonathan DeLaun Heaton, a man known for bringing a pet rattlesnake, named Cold Chills, into the ring and reciting Bible verses as he wrestled, earning the nickname “The Salt Lake Rattlesnake.” He played high school football and learned martial arts. Before entering the world of professional wrestling, Jonathan was a sailor in the United States Navy.

He lived in Vancouver, British Columbia since 1963. He was married to a woman named Rose. After retiring from professional wrestling, he pursued a career in underwater inventions and exploration. He survived bladder cancer.

In July 2016, Jonathan was named part of a class action lawsuit filed against WWE which alleged that wrestlers incurred traumatic brain injuries during their tenure and that the company concealed the risks of injury. The suit was litigated by attorney Konstantine Kyros, who has been involved in a number of other lawsuits against WWE. A month before his death, US District Judge Vanessa Lynne Bryant dismissed the lawsuit.

Jonathan entered a hospital in Langley at the end of August 2018 and died there on October 13, aged 87.

== Championships and accomplishments ==
- Alex Turk Promotions
  - NWA International Tag Team Championship (Winnipeg version) (2 times) – with Whipper Billy Watson (1) and Jim Hady (1)
- American Wrestling Association
  - World Heavyweight Championship (Omaha) (3 times)
- Catch Wrestling Association
  - CWA World Heavyweight Championship (1 time)
- Cauliflower Alley Club
  - Iron Mike Mazurki Award (2007)
- European Wrestling Union
  - EWU World Super Heavyweight Championship (1 time)
- Grand Prix Wrestling
  - GPW Heavyweight Championship (1 time)
- International Wrestling Association (Montreal)
  - IWA World Heavyweight Championship (2 times)
- Maple Leaf Wrestling
  - NWA Canadian Open Tag Team Championship (1 time) – with Gene Kiniski
- Midwest Wrestling Association (Ohio)
  - MWA American Tag Team Championship (1 time) – with Ray Stern
- NWA All-Star Wrestling
  - NWA Canadian Tag Team Championship (Vancouver version) (18 times) – with Kinji Shibuya (1), Roy McClarty (1), Gene Kiniski (1), Jim Hady (1), Haystacks Calhoun (2), Dominic DeNucci (1), Rocky Johnson (1), Sky-Hi Jones (1), Paddy Barrett (1), Johnny Kostas (1), John Tolos (1), Duncan McTavish (1), Steven Little Bear (1), Jimmy Snuka (1), John Anson (1), Dutch Savage (1), and John Quinn (1)
  - NWA Pacific Coast Heavyweight Championship (Vancouver version) (5 times)
  - NWA World Tag Team Championship (Vancouver version) (1 time) – with Dominic DeNucci
- Professional Wrestling Hall of Fame and Museum
  - Television Era (2006)
- Southwest Sports
  - NWA Brass Knuckles Championship (Texas version) (1 time)
  - NWA Texas Heavyweight Championship (2 times)
- Stampede Wrestling
  - NWA Canadian Heavyweight Championship (Calgary version) (2 times)
  - Stampede Wrestling Hall of Fame (Class of 1995)
- World Championship Wrestling
  - IWA World Tag Team Championship (2 times) – with Antonio Pugliese
- Worldwide Wrestling Associates
  - WWA International Television/United States Tag Team Championship (2 times) – with Fred Blassie (1) and Lord Leslie Carlton (1)
  - NWA "Beat the Champ" Television Championship (2 times)
- Wrestling Observer Newsletter
  - Wrestling Observer Newsletter Hall of Fame (Class of 1996)
