= NWA World Tag Team Championship (Vancouver version) =

Professional wrestling tag team championship

Details
- Promotion: NWA All-Star Wrestling
- Date established: June 1966
- Date retired: 1968
Statistics
- First champions: Tony Borne and John Tolos
- Most reigns: As a team: Don Jardine and Dutch Savage/John and Chris Tolos (2 reigns); Individual: John Tolos (3 reigns)
- Longest reign: John and Chris Tolos (203 days)
- Shortest reign: The Assassins (0-27 days)

The Vancouver version of the NWA World Tag Team Championship was a professional wrestling championship for tag teams that was used by NWA All-Star Wrestling from 1966 to 1968. When the National Wrestling Alliance (NWA) was created in 1948, the board of directors decided to allow each NWA member to create its own local version of the NWA World Tag Team Championship. As it is a professional wrestling championship, it is not won or lost competitively, but instead is determined by the decision of the bookers of a wrestling promotion. The title is awarded after the chosen team "wins" a match to maintain the illusion that professional wrestling is a competitive sport.

The first team to hold the championship was the Tolos brothers (Chris Tolos and John Tolos). Records indicate that they were presented as champions in June 1966, but records are unclear on how they won the belts. The title was used for just under two years before being abandoned in favor of the NWA Canadian Tag Team Championship. The Tolos brothers and the team of Don Jardine and Dutch Savage were the only teams to hold the championship twice, and John Tolos the only wrestler to hold the championship three times. The Tolos brothers' second reign, from March 13 to October 3, 1967, is the longest at 203 days. Don Leo Jonathan and Dominic DeNucci held the title for just 21 days, the shortest confirmed reign of any champion.

== Title history ==
Key
No.	Overall reign number
Reign	Reign number for the specific champion
Days	Number of days held

No.	Champion	Championship change			Reign statistics		Notes	Ref.
No.	Champion	Date	Event	Location	Reign	Days	Notes	Ref.
1	Tony Borne and John Tolos	June 1966	NWA All-Star show	(Note: The location of the match was not captured as part of the documentation.)	1	(Note: The exact date in June that Borne and Tolos became champions is uncertain, which means that this reign lasted between 95 days and 124 days.)	Records are unclear on how Borne and Tolos won the championship.	
2	Don Jardine and Dutch Savage	October 3, 1966	NWA All-Star show	Vancouver, British Columbia	1	84		
3	Don Leo Jonathan and Dominic DeNucci	December 26, 1966	NWA All-Star show	Vancouver, British Columbia	1	21		
4	John (2) and Chris Tolos	January 16, 1967	NWA All-Star show	Vancouver, British Columbia	1	21	Also won NWA Canadian Tag Team Championship	
5	Don Jardine and Dutch Savage	February 6, 1967	NWA All-Star show	Vancouver, British Columbia	2	35	Jardine and Savage only won the NWA World Tag Team Championship	
6	John (3) and Chris Tolos	March 13, 1967	NWA All-Star show	Vancouver, British Columbia	2	203		
7	Abdullah the Butcher and Dr. Jerry Graham	October 2, 1967	NWA All-Star show	Vancouver, British Columbia	1	63		
8	The Assassins (Assassin #1 and Assassin #2)	December 4, 1967	NWA All-Star show	Vancouver, British Columbia	1	(Note: The exact date in 1968 that the championship was abandoned is uncertain, which means that this reign lasted between 0 days and 179 days.)	Also won NWA Canadian Tag Team Championship	
—	Deactivated	1968	—	—	—	—	Championship was defended as recently as May 1968 but was later abandoned by NWA All-Star Wrestling in favor of the NWA Canadian Tag Team Championship	

== Team reigns by combined length ==
Key

Symbol	Meaning
¤	The exact length of at least one title reign is uncertain, so the shortest possible length is used.

Rank	Team	# of reigns	Combined days
1	John and Chris Tolos	2	224
2	Don Jardine and Dutch Savage	2	119
3	Tony Borne and John Tolos	1	95¤
4	Abdullah the Butcher and Dr. Jerry Graham	1	63
5	Don Leo Jonathan and Dominic DeNucci	1	21
6	The Assassins (Assassin #1 and Assassin #2)	1	¤

== Individual reigns by combined length ==
Key

Symbol	Meaning
¤	The exact length of at least one title reign is uncertain, so the shortest possible length is used.

Rank	Wrestler	# of reigns	Combined days
1	John Tolos	3	319¤
2	Chris Tolos	2	224
3	Don Jardine	2	119
3	Dutch Savage	2	119
5	Tony Borne	1	95¤
6	Abdullah the Butcher	1	63
6	Dr. Jerry Graham	1	63
8	Dominic DeNucci	1	21
8	Don Leo Jonathan	1	21
8	Assassin #1	1	¤
8	Assassin #2	1	¤
