= NWA Pacific Coast Heavyweight Championship (Vancouver version) =

Professional wrestling championship

The Vancouver version of the NWA Pacific Coast Heavyweight Championship was the major singles title in two National Wrestling Alliance-affiliated Vancouver territories. The championship was originally used in Big Time Wrestling from 1948 to about 1958, then was reactivated for use in NWA All Star Wrestling from 1970 until 1981, when the title was abandoned.

== Title history ==
Key
No.	Overall reign number
Reign	Reign number for the specific champion
Days	Number of days held
(NLT)	Championship change took place "no later than" the date listed

No.	Champion	Championship change			Reign statistics		Notes	Ref.
No.	Champion	Date	Event	Location	Reign	Days	Notes	Ref.
1	Frank Stojack	1948 (NLT)	NWA All-Star show	N/A	1	N/A	The first champion	
2	Gordon Hessell	April 28, 1948	NWA All-Star show	Vancouver, BC	1	N/A		
—		N/A	—	—				
3	Frank Stojack	N/A	NWA All-Star show	N/A	2	N/A		
4	Jack McLauchlan	June 8, 1949	NWA All-Star show	Vancouver, BC	1	N/A		
Championship history is unrecorded from June 8, 1949 to September 21, 1949.
—	Vacated	1949	—	—	—	—	Championship vacated for undocumented reasons	
5	Tony Ross	September 21, 1949	NWA All-Star show	Vancouver, BC	1	N/A	Defeated Leo Karilenko for the championship	
—		N/A	—	—				
6	Andy Tremaine	January 1952 (NLT)	NWA All-Star show	N/A	1	N/A	Recognized in Vancouver	
—		N/A	—	—				
7	The Masked Marvel	April 1952 (NLT)	NWA All-Star show	N/A	1	N/A		
—		N/A	—	—				
8	Roger Mackay	July 1952 (NLT)	NWA All-Star show	N/A	1	N/A		
—		N/A	—	—				
9	Carl Engstrom	N/A	NWA All-Star show	N/A	1	N/A		
10	Buddy Knox	March 24, 1954	NWA All-Star show	Vancouver, BC	1	N/A		
—		N/A	—	—				
11	Frank Stojack	June 1954 (NLT)	NWA All-Star show	N/A	3	N/A		
—		N/A	—	—				
12	Ed Francis	June 1957 (NLT)	NWA All-Star show	N/A	1	N/A		
—	Vacated	June 1957	—	—	—	—	Francis left the territory	
13	Bob Cummings	June 12, 1957	NWA All-Star show	Vancouver, BC	1	N/A	Defeated Herb Freeman in tournament final	
—	Vacated	May 1958 (NLT)	—	—	—	—		
14	Buddy Knox	May 14, 1958	NWA All-Star show	Vancouver, BC	2	N/A	Defeated George Pancheff in tournament final	
15	Kurt Von Poppenheim	1958	NWA All-Star show	N/A	1	N/A		
—	Vacated	N/A	—	—	—	—	Title inactive until 1970	
16	Mark Lewin	February 9, 1970	NWA All-Star show	Vancouver, BC	1	63	Defeated Moondog Mayne for reactivated title	
17	Gene Kiniski	April 13, 1970	NWA All-Star show	Vancouver, BC	1	70		
18	Don Leo Jonathan	June 22, 1970	NWA All-Star show	Vancouver, BC	1	109		
19	"Bulldog" Bob Brown	October 9, 1970	NWA All-Star show	Victoria, BC	1	59		
20	Don Leo Jonathan	December 7, 1970	NWA All-Star show	Vancouver, BC	2	21		
21	Gene Kiniski	December 28, 1970	NWA All-Star show	Vancouver, BC	2	203		
22	Steven Little Bear	July 19, 1971	NWA All-Star show	Vancouver, BC	1	63		
23	"Bulldog" Bob Brown	September 20, 1971	NWA All-Star show	Vancouver, BC	2	119		
24	Mark Lewin	January 17, 1972	NWA All-Star show	Vancouver, BC	2	21		
25	"Bulldog" Bob Brown	February 7, 1972	NWA All-Star show	Vancouver, BC	3	112		
26	Steven Little Bear	May 29, 1972	NWA All-Star show	Vancouver, BC	2	28		
27	Gene Kiniski	June 26, 1972	NWA All-Star show	Vancouver, BC	3	276		
28	The Brute	March 29, 1973	NWA All-Star show	Victoria, BC	1	25		
29	Sean Regan	April 23, 1973	NWA All-Star show	Vancouver, BC	1	53		
30	Mike Webster	June 15, 1973	NWA All-Star show	Vernon, BC	1	52		
31	The Brute	August 6, 1973	NWA All-Star show	New Westminster, BC	2	192		
32	Flash Gordon (George Gordienko)	February 14, 1974	NWA All-Star show	Victoria, BC	1	46		
33	Mr. X	April 1, 1974	NWA All-Star show	Vancouver, BC	1	196		
34	Gene Kiniski	October 14, 1974	NWA All-Star show	Vancouver, BC	4	98	Mr. X was unmasked, revealing Guy Mitchell	
5	Guy Mitchell	January 20, 1975	NWA All-Star show	Vancouver, BC	2	91		
36	Don Leo Jonathan	April 21, 1975	NWA All-Star show	Vancouver, BC	3	14		
37	Siegfried Steinke	May 5, 1975	NWA All-Star show	Vancouver, BC	1	97		
38	Gene Kiniski	August 10, 1975	NWA All-Star show	Vancouver, BC	5	148		
39	Don Leo Jonathan	January 5, 1976	NWA All-Star show	Vancouver, BC	4	63		
40	Kenji Shibuya	March 8, 1976	NWA All-Star show	Vancouver, BC	1	126		
41	John Tolos	July 12, 1976	NWA All-Star show	Vancouver, BC	1	28		
42	John Quinn	August 9, 1976	NWA All-Star show	Vancouver, BC	1	126		
43	Don Leo Jonathan	December 13, 1976	NWA All-Star show	Vancouver, BC	5	28		
44	Gene Kiniski	January 10, 1977	NWA All-Star show	Vancouver, BC	6	63		
45	Guy Mitchell	March 14, 1977	NWA All-Star show	Vancouver, BC	3	105		
46	"Iron" Mike Sharpe	June 27, 1977	NWA All-Star show	Vancouver, BC	1	56		
47	Mr. X	August 22, 1977	NWA All-Star show	Vancouver, BC	4	112		
48	Don Wayt	December 12, 1977	NWA All-Star show	Vancouver, BC	1	63		
49	John Quinn	February 13, 1978	NWA All-Star show	Vancouver, BC	2	91		
50	Gene Kiniski	May 15, 1978	NWA All-Star show	Vancouver, BC		318		
51	Salvatore Martino	March 29, 1979	NWA All-Star show	British Columbia	1	46		
52	Jean Louie (Neil Guay/The Hangman)	May 14, 1979	NWA All-Star show	Vancouver, BC	1	70		
53	Yaki Joe (Francisco Flores)	July 23, 1979	NWA All-Star show	Vancouver, BC	1	63		
54	Siegfried Steinke	September 24, 1979	NWA All-Star show	Victoria, BC	2	99		
55	Buddy Rose	January 1980	NWA All-Star show	British Columbia	1	N/A	May have been awarded; records unclear	
56	Jay Youngblood	February 9, 1981	NWA All-Star show	Vancouver, BC	1	N/A		
—	Deactivated	March 1981	—	—	—	—		

== See also ==
- National Wrestling Alliance
- NWA All Star Wrestling
