= John Tolos =

Greek-Canadian professional wrestler and manager (1931–2009)

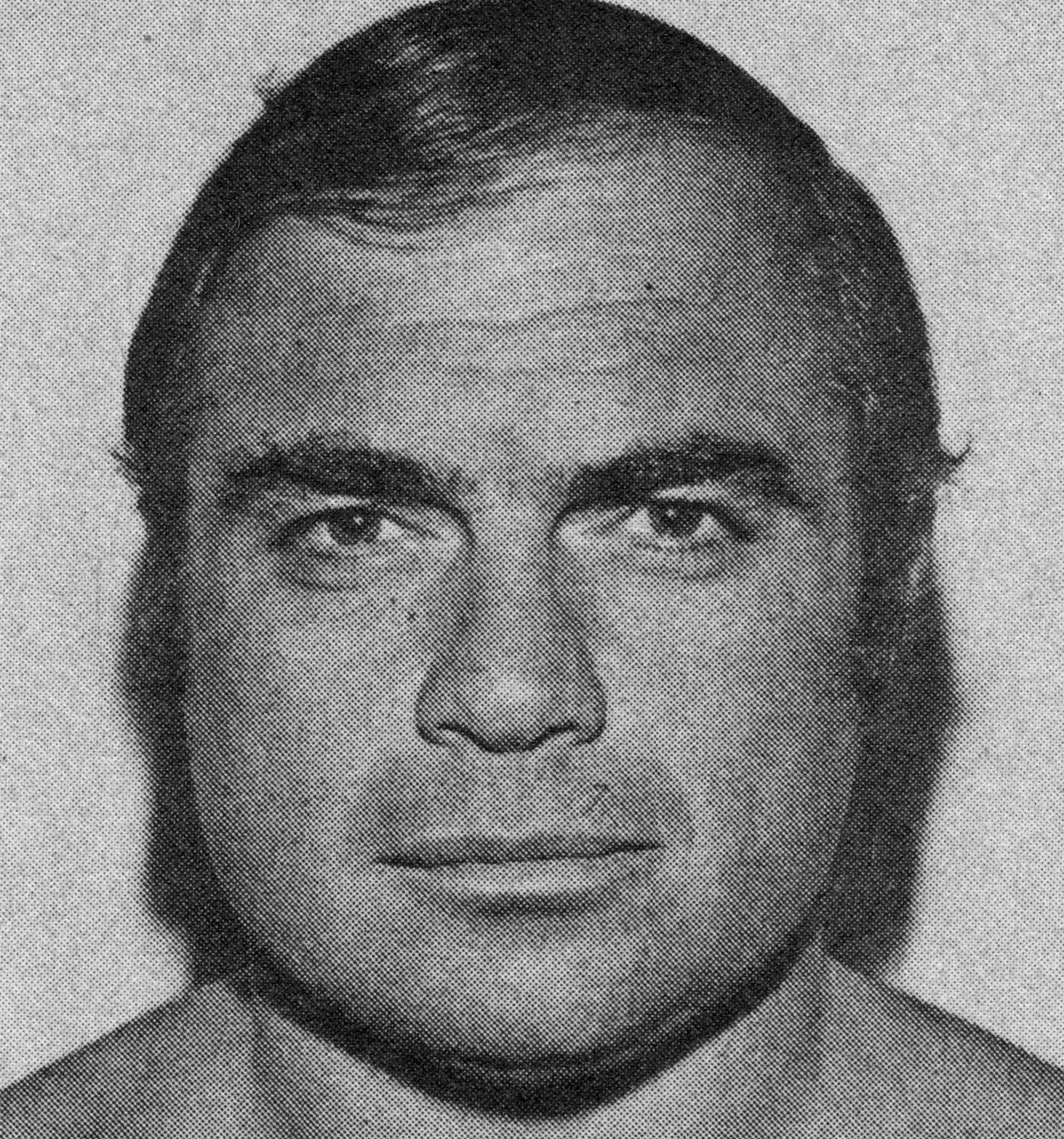

Personal information
- Born: John Tolos; April 5, 1931 Hamilton, Ontario, Canada
- Died: May 28, 2009 (aged 78) Los Angeles, California, U.S.
- Cause of death: Kidney failure
- Family: Chris Tolos (brother)

Professional wrestling career
- Ring name: John Tolos
- Billed height: 6 ft 2 in (188 cm)
- Billed weight: 240 lb (109 kg)
- Trained by: Wee Willie Davis
- Debut: 1951
- Retired: 1992

John Tolos, nicknamed "The Golden Greek", (April 5, 1931 – May 28, 2009) was a Canadian professional wrestler, and professional wrestling manager.

== Professional wrestling career ==
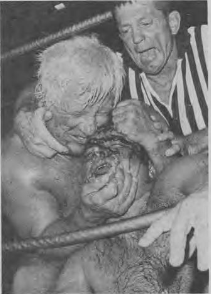
Freddie Blassie bites Tolos's face during a 1971 match

Tolos was born on April 5, 1931, in Hamilton, Ontario to Greek parents, Nicolaos and Evangelia (Evangeline) Tolos. During the 1950s and 60s, he was part of The Canadian Wrecking Crew with his brother Chris Tolos. On December 28, 1963, they captured the WWWF United States Tag Team Championship in Teaneck, New Jersey in two straight falls from Gorilla Monsoon and Killer Kowalski. While both teams were heels at the time, the Tolos Brothers did a television interview prior to the title match, "looking forward" to seeing all of their fans in Teaneck. That night, they were cheered throughout. As a vicious heel known as the "Golden Greek", Tolos also engaged in a long time rivalry with "Classy" Freddie Blassie in the LeBell family's World Wrestling Association, often feuding over the Americas Championship. Tolos had a run in Herb Abrams' Universal Wrestling Federation from 1990 to mid-1991, managing Cowboy Bob Orton, Cactus Jack and The Power Twins as well as serving as color commentator on the UWF's Fury Hour program.

Tolos joined the World Wrestling Federation (WWF) for a brief stint in early-1991 as Coach (a classic coach, complete with a whistle), managing The Beverly Brothers and "Mr. Perfect" Curt Hennig, replacing Hennig's former manager Bobby "The Brain" Heenan, who was then moving into a full-time broadcaster's role. When a back injury sidelined Hennig for more than a year, Tolos was replaced by The Genius as The Beverly Brothers' manager and departed the WWF. Tolos would return to Abrams' UWF as color commentator from 1992 through the promotion's final show in 1994. He also managed Cowboy Bob Orton, The Power Twins and Cactus Jack.

== Death ==
Tolos died in Los Angeles, California, on May 28, 2009, from kidney failure following a series of heart attacks and strokes.

== Championships and accomplishments ==
- 50th State Big Time Wrestling
  - NWA Hawaii Heavyweight Championship (1 time)
  - NWA North American Heavyweight Championship (Hawaii version) (1 time)
  - NWA Hawaii Tag Team Championship (1 time) - with Steve Strong
- Big Time Wrestling
  - NWA World Tag Team Championship (Detroit version) (1 time) - with Chris Tolos
- California Pro Wrestling
  - CPW Heavyweight Championship (1 time)
- Cauliflower Alley Club
  - Golden Potato Award (2004)
- Championship Wrestling from Florida
  - NWA World Tag Team Championship (Florida version) (1 time) - with Chris Tolos
- Heart of America Sports Attractions
  - NWA North American Tag Team Championship (Central States version) (1 time) – Baron von Helsinger
- Maple Leaf Wrestling
  - NWA International Tag Team Championship (Toronto version) (3 times) - with Chris Tolos
- Mid-Atlantic Championship Wrestling
  - NWA Southern Tag Team Championship (1 time) - with Chris Tolos
- National Wrestling Alliance
  - NWA Hall of Fame (Class of 2012)
- NWA All-Star Wrestling
  - NWA Canadian Tag Team Championship (Vancouver version) (7 times) - with Tony Borne (2), Chris Tolos (2), Black Terror (1), Dutch Savage (1), and Don Leo Jonathan (1)
  - NWA Pacific Coast Heavyweight Championship (Vancouver version) (1 time)
  - NWA World Tag Team Championship (Vancouver version) (3 times) - with Tony Borne (1) and Chris Tolos (2)
- NWA Hollywood Wrestling
  - NWA Americas Heavyweight Championship (10 times)
  - NWA Americas Tag Team Championship (6 times) - with Great Kojika (2), Louie Tillet (1), Rock Riddle (1), Chavo Guerrero (1), and The Assassin (1)
  - NWA "Beat the Champ" Television Championship (4 times)
  - NWA Brass Knuckles Championship (Los Angeles version) (3 times)
  - NWA United National Championship (1 time)
- NWA Los Angeles
  - NWA International Television Tag Team Championship (1 time) - with Gene Kiniski
- NWA San Francisco
  - NWA Pacific Coast Tag Team Championship (San Francisco version) (1 time) - with Chris Tolos
- NWA Western States Sports
  - NWA Western States Tag Team Championship (1 time) - with Mr. Sato
- Professional Wrestling Hall of Fame and Museum
  - Class of 2007 - Inducted as a member of the Canadian Wrecking Crew (with Chris Tolos)
- Stampede Wrestling
  - NWA International Tag Team Championship (Calgary version) (1 time) - with Chris Tolos
- Southwest Sports, Inc.
  - NWA Texas Tag Team Championship (1 time) - with Duke Keomuka
  - NWA Texas Heavyweight Championship (3 times)
- Western States Alliance
  - WSA Heavyweight Championship (1 time)
  - WSA Tag Team Championship (1 time) - with Victor Rivera
- World Wide Wrestling Association
  - WWWA American Tag Team Championship/WWWA World Tag Team Championship (1 time, final) - with Chris Tolos
- World Wide Wrestling Federation
  - WWWF United States Tag Team Championship (1 time) - with Chris Tolos
