= Von Brauners =

Professional wrestling stable

Tag team
- Members: Karl Von Brauner; Kurt Von Brauner#1; Eric Von Brauner; Kurt Von Brauner#2; Cliff Von Brauner; Saul Weingeroff (manager)
- Name(s): The Von Brauners; Kurt & Karl Von Brauner
- Billed from: Germany
- Debut: 1960
- Disbanded: 1974

The Von Brauners were a professional wrestling tag team/stable that operated from the 1950s through the 1970s. The teams consisted of Karl Von Brauner (Doug Donnan), Kurt Von Brauner #1 (Jimmy Brawner), Eric Von Brauner (Ron Donnan), and Kurt Von Brauner #2 (Willy Rutgowsky). The chosen gimmick was that of a team of evil German twins.

The four members worked as the Von Brauners for approximately 15 years. The team of Karl and Kurt #1 captured World Tag Team gold 20 times. All versions of the team captured a total of 35 world tag team championships plus five regional tag team championships.

== Professional wrestling career ==
Jimmy Brawner and Doug Donovan began tag teaming together in January 1960 as Kurt and Karl Von Brauner, respectively, with the gimmick of evil German twins. Some promotional material cited them as descending from Teutonic royalty. Fellow professional wrestler Dick Steinborn suggested the two wrestle together after noting that they resembled each other. The duo first teamed together in Oklahoma. They were paired with Saul Weingeroff as their manager in the early 1960s, and Weingeroff frequently interfered in their matches by wielding his cane against the Von Brauners' opponents. Later, they were booked by Nick Gulas in NWA Mid-America. When Jimmy Brauner and Doug Donovan split up in 1965, Donovan's real life brother Ron "Red" Donnan began teaming with him as Karl and Eric Von Brauner. Eric retired in the late 1960s and was replaced by the second Kurt Von Brauner, played by Willy Rutgowsky. They teamed together in San Francisco with Gerhardt Kaiser as their manager. While the team has been said to be disbanded in 1974, the team continued on in NWA Hollywood Wrestling with Karl and Cliff Von Brauner(Mike McManus) in what may have been the final run of the Von Brauners.

== Personal lives ==
=== Karl Von Brauner ===
Doug Donovan played the Karl Von Brauner character. He was born Doug Donnan on a dairy farm in Stirling, Ontario. He played junior football in Edmonton, Alberta. While working at a gym, Stu Hart "discovered" Donovan and trained him to be a professional wrestler. During his wrestling years, he changed his name to Donovan, and at 5′10″, he weighed 215 pounds. Donovan had some early success with Pacific Northwest Wrestling as a singles wrestler, winning the NWA Pacific Northwest Heavyweight Championship once, as well as the NWA Pacific Northwest Tag Team Championship five times (including twice with his brother Red). Later, Donovan legally changed his name to Karl Von Brauner.

In the mid-1960s, Donovan teamed with Al Costello as The Internationals with Gary Hart as their manager. The team was later managed by George "Crybaby" Cannon. The Internationals worked mainly in Tennessee and Texas for NWA Western States. In Texas, they won the Texas version of the NWA World Tag Team Championship. Donovan also later held this title with partner Luke Graham. The Internationals were also billed as the first NWA American Tag Team Champions, titles that were also recognized by World Class Championship Wrestling in addition to the Western States promotion. The Internationals lost the American Tag Team title to Fritz and Waldo Von Erich on February 21, 1967.

While Donovan was said to have retired from professional wrestling in 1975, to work as an air freight pilot in California, he wrestled as Inferno #1 of The Infernos for NWA Hollywood Wrestling and then reformed The Von Brauners with Cliff Von Brauner in NWA Hollywood Wrestling after the Infernos lost their masks. In the years before his death, he worked as a crop duster. He had a wife Sherry and two sons named Jeff and Chris. After a stroke and open heart surgery, he died on July 5, 2009.

=== Kurt Von Brauner #1 ===
Jimmy Brawner played the first version of Kurt Von Brauner. Brawner was originally from Tennessee. He was of German heritage and was able to speak German, as well. Brawner later legally changed his name to Kurt Von Brawner to protect kayfabe. After retiring from professional wrestling, he worked for the Southland Corporation in Tampa and later for the Shriners as chief of security for their hospital. Brawner died from a stroke on July 4, 2004. He lived in Tampa with his wife Joann until his death.

=== Eric Von Brauner ===
Doug Donovan's real life brother Ron "Red" Donnan played Eric Von Brauner. Red was two years younger than his brother Doug, but he was also born on a dairy farm in Stirling, Ontario. Red worked for the Royal Canadian Air Force.

He trained as a professional wrestler with Bert Ruby in Detroit. In the late 1950s, he worked in Pacific Northwest Wrestling, where he held the NWA Pacific Northwest Tag Team Championship twice with his brother. Red retired from professional wrestling in the late 1960s and joined the fire department in Memphis. He later moved to Covington, Georgia.

=== Kurt Von Brauner #2 ===
The second incarnation of Kurt Von Brauner was played by Willy Rutgowsky, who also previously wrestled under the name Kurt Von Stroheim. Under the Von Stroheim name, Rutgowsky teamed with the original Kurt Von Brauner, Jimmy Brawner. He was also of German heritage, and was interned by the Nazis during World War II before becoming a professional wrestler. Rutgowsky died on February 17, 1993.

=== Cliff Von Brauner ===
Cliff Von Brauner was portrayed by Mike McManus in 1976. Little is known of McManus' career due to McManus often wrestling under masks. He wrestled as "Bruiser" McManus and was a journeyman wrestler. He made appearances as Inferno #3 as early as 1967 for NWA Mid-America and was part of the Infernos team from 1975-1976 in NWA Hollywood Wrestling and in New Japan Pro Wrestling. He later became "Cliff Von Brauner" for NWA Hollywood Wrestling in 1976 and teamed up with Curtis Smith as, "The Challengers.

== Championships and accomplishments ==
=== Karl and Kurt Von Brauner ===
- Western States Sports
  - NWA World Tag Team Championship (Amarillo version) (1 time)

=== Karl and Kurt Von Brauner #1 ===
- American Wrestling Association
  - AWA World Tag Team Championship (Indiana version) (1 time)
- National Wrestling Alliance
  - NWA World Tag Team Championship (Mid-America version) (8 times)
  - NWA Southern Tag Team Championship (Mid-America version) (2 times)
  - NWA Southern Tag Team Championship (Mid-Atlantic version) (1 time)
  - NWA World Tag Team Championship (Florida version) (6 times)
  - NWA World Tag Team Championship (Texas version) (1 time)
  - NWA World Tag Team Championship (Georgia version) (3 times)
- World Wrestling Association
  - WWA World Tag Team Championship (1 time)

=== Karl and Eric Von Brauner ===
- National Wrestling Alliance
  - NWA World Tag Team Championship (Mid-America version) (2 times)
  - NWA World Tag Team Championship (Georgia version) (1 time)

=== Karl and Kurt Von Brauner #2 ===
- National Wrestling Alliance
  - NWA World Tag Team Championship (Mid-America version) (10 times)
  - NWA World Tag Team Championship (Texas version) (3 times)
  - NWA World Tag Team Championship (Tennessee version) (1 time)
  - NWA World Tag Team Championship (Detroit version) (1 time)
  - NWA World Tag Team Championship (San Francisco version) (2 times)

=== Kurt and Fritz Von Brauner ===
- Georgia Championship Wrestling
  - NWA International Tag Team Championship (Georgia version) (1 time)
