= Dick Steinborn =

American wrestler (1933–2020)

Personal information
- Born: Richard O'Neil Steinborn; September 28, 1933 St.Louis, Missouri, U.S.
- Died: April 18, 2020 (aged 86) Columbus, Georgia, U.S.

Professional wrestling career
- Ring name(s): Dickie Gunkel; Dick Steinborn; Gladiator; Masked Superstar; Mr. High; Mr. Wrestling; White Knight
- Billed height: 5 ft 9 in (175 cm)
- Billed weight: 242 lb (110 kg)
- Debut: July 24, 1951
- Retired: 1984

Richard O'Neil Steinborn (September 28, 1933 – April 18, 2020) was an American professional wrestler who wrestled under the ring name Dick Steinborn in various territories including Georgia Championship Wrestling, and World Wrestling Council in Puerto Rico.

== Professional wrestling career ==
The son of German-born wrestler turned Florida wrestling promoter Heinrich "Milo" Steinborn, Dick got into wrestling in 1951. In 1959, Steinborn won the NWA Southern Heavyweight Championship (Georgia version) where he became a three-time champion.

In 1962, Steinborn teamed with Doug Gilbert in Minnesota for Verne Gagne's American Wrestling Association as High and Low. Steinborn was known as Mr. Low.

Steinborn made his debut in Puerto Rico in 1974 for the newly World Wrestling Council where he became a three-time WWC World Junior Heavyweight Championship and a four-time WWC Caribbean Heavyweight Championship.

He retired from wrestling in 1984.

== Death ==
Steinborn died on April 18, 2020, at 86 from years of declining health.

== Championships and accomplishments ==
- American Wrestling Association
  - AWA World Tag Team Championship (1 time) - with Doug Gashouse Gilbert
- Mid-South Sports
  - NWA Southern Heavyweight Championship (Georgia version) (3 times)
  - NWA Georgia Tag Team Championship (1 time) - with Argentina Apollo
- All-South Wrestling Alliance
  - ASWA Georgia Junior Heavyweight Champion (1 time, first)
  - ASWA Georgia Television Champion (1 time, first)
  - ASWA Georgia Tag Team Championship (1 time, first) - with Argentina Apollo
- Championship Wrestling from Florida
  - NWA United States Tag Team Championship (Florida version) (2 times) - with Eddie Graham
- NWA Big Time Wrestling / World Class Championship Wrestling
  - NWA Texas Tag Team Championship (1 time) - with Mark Lewin
- World Wrestling Council
  - WWC World Junior Heavyweight Championship (3 times)
  - WWC Caribbean Heavyweight Championship (4 times)
