= List of mummy films =

The following is a list of mummy films.

== Films ==
Title	Year	Director	Notes	References
Abbott and Costello Meet the Mummy	1955	Charles Lamont	a parody of the Kharis the Mummy series from the 1940s; Kharis is here renamed Klaris	
The All New Adventures of Laurel & Hardy in For Love or Mummy	1999	John R. Cherry III and Larry Harmon	based on the short films of Laurel and Hardy	
Ancient Evil: Scream of the Mummy (Bram Stoker's Legend of the Mummy 2)	2000	David DeCoteau		
Ancient Evil 2: Guardian of the Underworld	2005	D.W. Kann		
The Awakening	1980	Mike Newell	the third film version of Bram Stoker's 1903 novel The Jewel of Seven Stars	
The Aztec Mummy (La Momia Azteca)	1957	Rafel Lopez Portillo	the first film in the Aztec Mummy trilogy	
Blood from the Mummy's Tomb	1971	Seth Holt	loosely adapted from Bram Stoker's 1903 novel The Jewel of Seven Stars	
Bram Stoker's Legend of the Mummy	1998	Jeffrey Obrow	based on Bram Stoker's 1903 novel The Jewel of Seven Stars	
Bubba Ho-Tep	2002	Don Coscarelli		
The Cabin in the Woods	2012	Drew Goddard		
El castillo de los monstruos	1958	Julián Soler		
The Creeps	1997	Charles Band		
The Curse of the Aztec Mummy (La Maldición de la Momia Azteca)	1957	Rafael Portillo	the second film in the Aztec Mummy trilogy	
The Curse of King Tut's Tomb (The Curse of King Tut)	2006	Russell Mulcahy		
The Curse of the Mummy's Tomb	1964	Michael Carreras		
Dawn of the Mummy	1981	Frank Agrama	mummies are portrayed as ravenous flesh eaters, similar to the popular portrayal of zombies in which both share many similarities	
Die Augen der Mumie Ma	1918	Ernst Lubitsch		
Egyptian Melodies	1931	Wilfred Jackson	Silly Symphonies animated short film	
The Extraordinary Adventures of Adèle Blanc-Sec (Les Aventures extraordinaires d'Adèle Blanc-Sec)	2010	Luc Besson		
Face of the Screaming Werewolf	1964	Gilberto Martínez Solares, Jerry Warren, Rafael Portillo	created by combining parts of two unrelated Mexican horror films (La Casa del Terror (1960) and La Momia Azteca (1957))	
The Fool and Death (Narr und Tod)	1920	Rudolf Stiaßny		
Hotel Transylvania	2012	Genndy Tartakovsky	computer-animated horror/comedy film	
Hotel Transylvania 2	2015	Genndy Tartakovsky		
Hotel Transylvania 3: Summer Vacation	2018	Genndy Tartakovsky		
Hotel Transylvania: Transformania	2022	Derek Drymon and Jennifer Kluska		
House of Ka	2023	Josie Eli Herman	inspired by Bram Stoker's 1903 novel The Jewel of Seven Stars	
The Hyperborean	2023	Jesse Thomas Cook		
Lee Cronin's The Mummy	2026	Lee Cronin	distributed by Warner Bros.	
Legion of the Dead	2005	Paul Bales	produced by The Asylum	
Mad Mad Mad Monsters	1972	Jules Bass, Arthur Rankin Jr.	animated prequel to Mad Monster Party?	
Mad Monster Party?	1967	Jules Bass	stop-motion animated musical comedy film	
Mil Mascaras vs. the Aztec Mummy (Mil Mascaras: Resurrection)	2007	Andrew Quint (Jeff Burr), Chip Gubera	the first film in a trilogy starring the Mexican masked wrestler Mil Máscaras; the two sequels were Academy of Doom (2008) and Aztec Revenge (2015) (the third film especially continues the storyline of the first film)	
Monster Brawl	2011	Jesse Thomas Cook		
Monster Family (Happy Family)	2017	Holger Tappe		
Monster Mash	1995	Joel Cohen, Alec Sokolow	computer animated horror/comedy film	
The Monster Squad	1987	Fred Dekker		
Los Monstruos del Terror	1970	Tulio Demicheli, Hugo Fregonese, Eberhard Meichsner		
The Mummy	1911			
The Mummy Strikes	1943	Isadore Sparber		
The Mummy	1959	Terence Fisher		
The Mummy	1999	Stephen Sommers		
The Mummy	1932	Karl Freund		
The Mummy	2017	Alex Kurtzman		
The Mummy: Book of the Dead	2027	Matt Bettinelli-Olpin, Tyler Gillett		
Mummy's Boys	1936	Fred Guiol		
The Mummy's Curse	1944	Leslie Goodwins	the fourth and final film in the Kharis the Mummy series	
The Mummy's Hand	1940	Christy Cabanne	the first film in the Kharis the Mummy series	
The Mummy's Shroud	1967	John Gilling		
The Mummy's Ghost	1944	Reginald LeBorg	the third film in the Kharis the Mummy series	
The Mummy Returns	2001	Stephen Sommers		
The Mummy Theme Park	2000	Alvaro Passeri		
The Mummy: Tomb of the Dragon Emperor	2008	Rob Cohen		
The Mummy's Tomb	1942	Harold Youn	the second film in the Kharis the Mummy series	
Orgy of the Dead	1965	Stephen C. Apostolof	erotic horror film	
Pharaoh's Curse	1957	Lee Sholem		
The Pyramid	2014	Grégory Levasseur		
Prisoners of the Sun	2013	Roger Christian	The Voyagers must find a way to stop the mummy of Al Khem Ayut (Cedric Proust) and escape from the pyramid before time runs out.	
Robbing Cleopatra's Tomb (Cléopâtre)	1899	Georges Méliès		
The Robot vs. The Aztec Mummy (La Momia Azteca contra el Robot Humano)	1958	Rafael Portillo	the third and final film in the Aztec Mummy trilogy	
Das Rätsel der Sphinx (The Riddle of the Sphinx)	1921	Adolf Gärtner		
Scooby-Doo and the Ghoul School	1988	Charles A. Nichols		
Scooby-Doo! and the Reluctant Werewolf	1988	Ray Patterson		
Scooby-Doo! in Where's My Mummy?	2005	Joe Sichta		
The Scorpion King 2: Rise of a Warrior	2008	Russell Mulcahy	direct-to-video	
The Scorpion King 3: Battle for Redemption	2012	Roel Reine	direct-to-video	
The Scorpion King 4: Quest for Power	2015	Mike Elliott	direct-to-video	
The Tomb	1986	Fred Olen Ray		
Tale of the Mummy	1998	Russell Mulcahy		
Tales from the Darkside: The Movie	1990	John Harrison		
Time Walker	1982	Tom Kennedy		
Trance	1998	Michael Almereyda		
Under Wraps	1997	Greg Beeman		
Waxwork	1988	Anthony Hickox		
We Want Our Mummy	1939	Del Lord	Three Stooges short film	
