= Jeffrey Uhlmann =

American research scientist

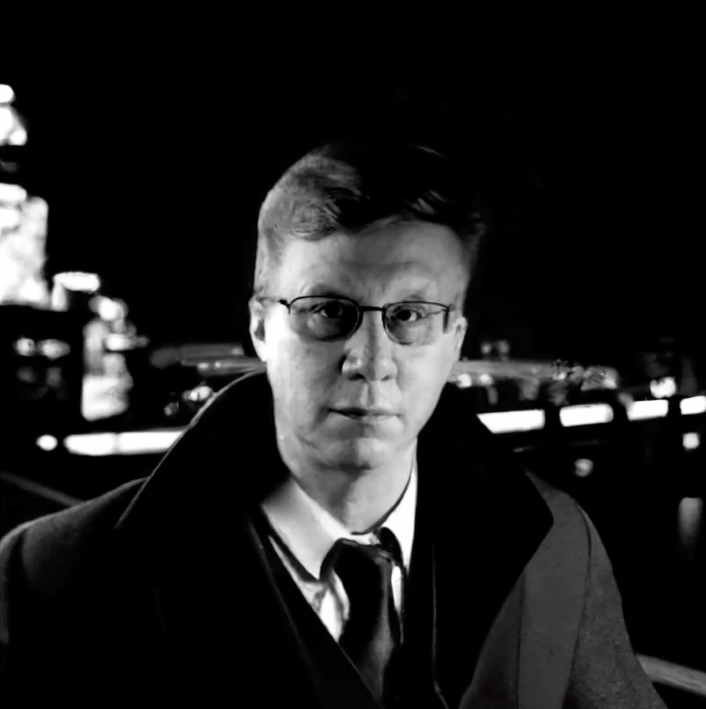
Uhlmann

Jeffrey K. Uhlmann is an American research scientist known for his mathematical generalizations of the Kalman filter. Most of his publications and patents have been in the field of data fusion. He is also a filmmaker and former recording artist.

Uhlmann is ranked in the top 2% among scientists worldwide in the Stanford University listing of most-cited researchers.

== Biography ==
Uhlmann has degrees in philosophy, computer science, and a doctorate in robotics from the University of Oxford. He began work in 1987 at NRL's Laboratory for Computational Physics and Fluid Dynamics in Washington, DC, and remained at NRL until 2000. Since 2000 he has been a professor of computer science at the University of Missouri. He was a co-founding member of the editorial board of the ACM Journal of Experimental Algorithmics from 1995 to 2006 before becoming co-editor of the Synthesis Lectures on Quantum Computing series for Morgan & Claypool.

Uhlmann published seminal papers on volumetric, spatial, and metric tree data structures and their applications for computer graphics, virtual reality, and multiple-target tracking. He originated the unscented transform (and its use in the unscented Kalman filter) and the data fusion techniques of covariance intersection and covariance union. His work in artificial intelligence has focused on tensor-completion methods for recommender system applications.

Uhlmann's results have been applied in tracking, navigation, and control systems, including for the NASA Mars rover program. His results relating to the constrained shortest path problem and simultaneous localization and mapping are also used in rover and autonomous vehicle applications.

Uhlmann recorded and released a series of albums in the 1970s and 1980s. Some of his early experimental electronic albums have been reissued in their entirety on CD or digital download while other songs are only available on CD compilations. Uhlmann has also written, directed, produced, and/or acted in several short and feature-length films, including the animated short film Susan's Big Day and the feature films Mil Mascaras vs. the Aztec Mummy, Academy of Doom, and Aztec Revenge. He has been a guest at international genre film festivals.
