= Creatures from the Abyss =

- Promotional release poster
- Directed by: Alvaro Passeri
- Screenplay by: Richard Baumann
- Story by: Richard Baumann
- Produced by: Al Passeri; Joseph Holden
- Starring: Clay Rogers; Michael Bon; Sharon Twomey; Laura di Palma; Ann Wolf; Deran Sarafian
- Cinematography: David Williams
- Edited by: Peter Jones
- Music by: Elikonia Group
- Distributed by: Production Film 82
- Release date: 8 January 2000 (Japan)
- Running time: 86 minutes
- Country: Italy
- Language: Italian
- Budget: $250,000

Creatures from the Abyss (Italian: Plankton) is a 1994 Italian horror film directed by Alvaro Passeri and written by Richard Baumann. The film stars Clay Rogers, Michael Bon, Sharon Twomey, Laura di Palma, Ann Wolf, and Deran Sarafian.

== Synopsis ==
A group of five teenagers (three girls, two boys) get lost in the ocean in a dinghy, and a big storm begins. Suddenly they spot a yacht sitting in the middle of the ocean, and they go to investigate and to find shelter. But in fact, the yacht was a secret laboratory studying mutated fish resulting from radioactive plankton. One of the specimens escaped, killed the crew, and preys on the unsuspecting teenagers.

== Cast ==
- Clay Rogers as Mike
- Michael Bon as Bobby
- Sharon Twomey as Margareth
- Laura di Palma as Dorothy
- Ann Wolf as Julie
- Deran Sarafian as Professor Clark

== Release ==
Shriek Studio released Creatures from the Abyss on 31 July 2007 as part of the Mutant Monsters Triple Feature along with The Dark and The Being.

== Reception ==
Much of the coverage for Creatures from the Abyss focused on the film's production values, acting, and dubbing. HorrorNews.net noted that the film contained poor dubbing, special effects, and acting while also stating "Is this movie worth your time? I'd have to say 'Yes!' Is it a new cult classic in the making? Maybe. Don't really see people flinging caviar at the screen. Still, it is quite quotable, and makes for a great party film with like-minded friends." Clive Davies noted many of the same issues with the film in his book Spinegrinder, however wrote that the stop motion effects were "quite good".

Bleeding Skull called the film a ripoff of Piranha, further writing that the film "looks like it was shot by the team behind Friday the 13th Part VIII: Jason Takes Manhattan and feels like it was written by Lloyd Kaufman between The Toxic Avenger and Class of Nuke 'Em High.
