= List of SLAM methods =

This is a list of simultaneous localization and mapping (SLAM) methods. The KITTI Vision Benchmark Suite website has a more comprehensive list of Visual SLAM methods.

== List of methods ==
- EKF SLAM
- FastSLAM 1.0
- FastSLAM 2.0
- L-SLAM (Matlab code)
- QSLAM
- GraphSLAM
- Occupancy Grid SLAM
- DP-SLAM
- Parallel Tracking and Mapping (PTAM)
- LSD-SLAM (available as open-source)
- S-PTAM (available as open-source)
- ORB-SLAM (available as open-source)
- ORB-SLAM2 (available as open-source)
- ORB-SLAM3 (available as open-source)
- OrthoSLAM
- MonoSLAM
- GroundSLAM
- CoSLAM
- SeqSlam
- iSAM (Incremental Smoothing and Mapping)
- CT-SLAM (Continuous Time) - referred to as Zebedee (SLAM)
- RGB-D SLAM
- BranoSLAM
- Kimera (open-source)
- Wildcat-SLAM
