= Passeri (surname) =

Passeri is a surname. Notable people with the surname include:

- Alvaro Passeri, Italian special effects artist and film director
- Cinzio Passeri Aldobrandini, Italian cardinal
- Giovanni Battista Passeri (c. 1610 – 1679), Italian painter and biographer of artists of the Baroque period
- Giuseppe Passeri, Italian painter of the Baroque period, nephew of Giovanni
- Marco Antonio Passeri, Italian Renaissance philosopher
