= Slasher.com =

- Film poster
- Directed by: Chip Gubera
- Screenplay by: Chelsea Andes
- Produced by: Chip Gubera; Ben Kaplan; Brian Maurer; Adam Boster
- Starring: Jewel Shepard; R. A. Mihailoff; Ben Kaplan; Delious Kennedy; Morgan Carter; Rebecca Crowley
- Cinematography: Brian Maurer
- Edited by: Chip Gubera
- Distributed by: ITN Distribution
- Release dates: October 2016 (Bloody Horror); March 7, 2017
- Country: United States
- Language: English

Slasher.com is a 2016 horror feature film directed by Chip Gubera and starring Jewel Shepard, R. A. Mihailoff, All-4-One's Delious Kennedy, Ben Kaplan, and Morgan Carter.

== Premise ==
After meeting online, Jack and Kristy go on a weekend getaway to the woodlands of rural Missouri. While discovering each other, they soon learn of the terrorizing horrors that the forest has in store.

== Cast ==
- Ben Kaplan as Jack Roper
- Jessica Waller as Hannah
- Sarah Kaplan as Priscilla Howard
- Adam Boster as Agent Hunter
- Jason C. Jones as Lieutenant Jones (credited as Jason Jones)
- Jace Boster as Sergeant Mango
- Josh Kaplan as Captain Jack Thoms
- Dirk J. Westphal as Officer James (credited as Dirk Westphal)
- T.M. McKenna as Officer T. McKintosh (credited as Travis M. McKenna)
- Laura Mikytuck as Screaming Blonde
- Brittany Vecchio as Prostitute
- Morgan Carter as Kristy Smith
- Jewel Shepard as Momma Myers
- R. A. Mihailoff as Jesse Myers
- Rebecca Crowley as Caitlin Myers
- Conrad Gubera as Jimmy
- Delious as Sheriff Weston (credited as Delious Kennedy)
- Lindsey Ham as Flashback Victim 1
- Anna Coleman as Flashback Victim 2
- Rob Steinbruegge as Rob, The Clerk

== Awards ==
Award	Festival	Year
Best Feature Film	Bloody Horror International Film Festival	2016
Best Horror Feature	Hollywood Boulevard Film Festival	2016
Best Screenplay	The Optical Theatre Film Festival	2016
Gold Award Winner	Spotlight Horror Film Awards	2016
