= Academy of Doom =

2008 film by Chip Gubera

- Theatrical release poster
- Directed by: Chip Gubera
- Written by: Jeffrey Uhlmann
- Produced by: Robert Swope, Jeffrey Uhlmann
- Starring: Mil Máscaras, Sabrina Braden, Jeffrey Uhlmann, Jaxon Stanford, Jolene Kay
- Cinematography: Gene Ertel
- Edited by: Robert Swope
- Music by: Vaughn Johnson
- Distributed by: Project IT
- Release date: July 23, 2008
- Running time: 85 minutes
- Countries: United States; Mexico
- Language: English

Academy of Doom (also known as Mil Mascaras: Academy of Doom) is a 2008 Mexican-American lucha libre film directed by Chip Gubera and starring the legendary Mexican masked wrestler and film star Mil Máscaras. It shared production personnel with Mil Mascaras vs. the Aztec Mummy (MMvsAM) and was completed at the same time as that film and screened with it at several film festivals.

Featured professional wrestlers in the film include: Mil Mascaras, La Torcha, Luctor, Dramatico, Logico, The Headmistress, Medea, Dianoche, Argozan, El Medico Angel, The Magister, Luchanaut, Synaptico, and Eigeno.

== Plot ==
Mysterious deaths coincide with the arrival of a mysterious Baron from Salinia who wishes to enroll his daughter into the Mil Mascaras Wrestling Women Academy. The Baron makes a financial donation to the Academy that thwarts a take-over attempt by the villainous Luctor. After cadets at the Academy are nearly killed by a mini assassin, La Torcha calls in her friend Mil Mascaras to assist with investigation. They discover that Luctor orchestrated the Baron's visit and has plans to kill anyone who stands in the way of his efforts to take over the Academy. Luctor is killed when the Baron discovers that he (Luctor) has been manipulating him and his daughter. The Baron is mortally wounded in the conflict and gives a dying confession to Mil Mascaras and La Torcha.

== Production ==
Most of the film, including all Academy scenes, were filmed on the campus of the University of Missouri-Columbia. The flamethrower battle was filmed at the Columbia city fire training center. The Guitar Mansion, also in Columbia, was used for both interiors and exteriors of the Baron's residence. Filming for both Academy of Doom and Mil Mascaras vs. the Aztec Mummy were completed as part of the same shoot in spring of 2006, and post-production for both films was also completed simultaneously in 2008 prior to a joint screening at a film festival in Rio de Janeiro.

== Character continuity from MMvsAM ==
Mil Mascaras and Luctor are the only characters with speaking roles in MMvsAM that also have speaking roles in AoD. La Torcha does not have a speaking role in MMvsAM but does in AoD, while the reverse is true for The Magister. Argozan and El Medico Angel make non-speaking appearances in both films. It is implied that the masked character of Maura Incognito from MMvsAM is the alter ego of Maura from this film.

== Reception ==
The film was well received by critics and audiences during its festival run starting in 2008 and ending at the Fantasia International Film Festival in 2012. In addition to positive reviews jointly with Mil Mascaras vs. the Aztec Mummy, the film also received positive reviews on its own. It was followed by the third film in the trilogy, Aztec Revenge.
