= Mil Mascaras vs. the Aztec Mummy =

2007 film by Jeff Burr, Chip Gubera

Mil Mascaras vs. the Aztec Mummy (a.k.a. Mil Mascaras: Resurrection)
- Theatrical release poster
- Directed by: Andrew Quint; Chip Gubera
- Written by: Jeffrey Uhlmann
- Produced by: Kannappan Palaniappan; Jeffrey Uhlmann; Chuck Williams
- Starring: Mil Máscaras; Jeffrey Uhlmann
- Cinematography: Tom Callaway
- Edited by: Thom Calderon
- Music by: Vaughn Johnson
- Distributed by: Osmium Entertainment
- Release date: 2007
- Running time: 90 minutes
- Countries: Mexico, United States
- Language: English

Mil Mascaras vs. the Aztec Mummy (also known as Mil Mascaras: Resurrection) is a 2007 Mexican-American wrestling film starring the legendary Mexican professional wrestler and cult film star Mil Máscaras. It has the distinction of being the first lucha film starring any of the "Big 3" (Santo, Blue Demon, Mil Máscaras) to be produced in English. It was a tribute to the 1960s Mexican horror and lucha libre films and was the first of a trilogy of Mil Mascaras films that includes Academy of Doom (2008) and Aztec Revenge (2015).

== Plot ==
An Aztec mummy is resurrected in a ceremony in which the blood of a human sacrifice is dripped onto the mummified remains. The mummy possesses a scepter with a jewel that can be used to control people’s minds for purposes of world conquest. Mil Máscaras learns of the mummy’s plans and is determined to thwart him.

When the scepter fails to do so, the mummy attempts to control Mil's mind by exploiting the hallucinogenic effects of Aztec magic mushrooms and the allure of identical twin seductresses. Mil tracks the mummy to an abandoned monastery, but is captured. After escaping with the help of the Professor, Mil is joined by a team of luchadores in a battle against the mummy's warriors. Mil eventually defeats the mummy and entombs him forever.

== Cast ==
- Mil Máscaras as Mil Máscaras
- Jeffrey Uhlmann as The Aztec mummy
- Kurt Mirtsching as The Professor
- Willard E. Pugh as Police Commissioner
- Richard Lynch as U.S. President
- Melissa Osborn as Maria
- Marco Lanzagorta
- P. J. Soles

plus cameos by:

- El Hijo del Santo
- Blue Demon Jr.
- Harley Race
- Dos Caras
- Huracán Ramírez, Jr.
- Neutron

== Cameos ==
The film has appearances by some of the most famous wrestlers/luchadores in the world, including El Hijo del Santo (the son of Santo, both in the ring and in real life), Blue Demon, Jr., Harley Race, Dos Caras (Mil Máscaras' real-life brother), Huracán Ramírez, Jr., Neutron, and others. Veteran Hollywood actress P. J. Soles also makes a brief appearance, and Richard Lynch plays the President of the United States.

== Distribution ==
In 2009, the film was released theatrically in the U.S. by Monogram Releasing and often screened with Academy of Doom and the short film Susan's Big Day. It was released on DVD in 2012.

== Critical response ==
The film screened at festivals around the world, garnering awards and award nominations along with very positive critical reviews. In particular, a review from the Cine Fantastico festival in Estepona, Spain, suggested that the film may be the best ever made in the traditionally Mexican lucha genre, despite being produced in the United States. Reviews from major film critics were similarly positive, with PopMatters' Bill Gibron calling it "amazing movie entertainment... rivals any super hero film made in the mainstream" and M. J. Simpson giving it an 'A' (the highest letter grade).

Similarly positive reviews accompanied the film's theatrical release in 2009, with Fangoria magazine giving it 3.5 skulls (out of 4). In addition to film festival awards and nominations, the film also received a Rondo Award nomination for Best Independent Film (Runner-Up) after its DVD release and was featured in cover articles in Screem magazine and Filmfax.
