= Aztec mummy =

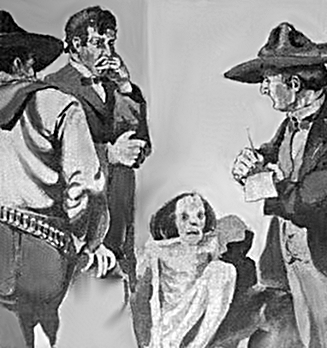

Aztec mummy refers to an intentionally prepared or naturally desiccated human body of Aztec origin.

== Ceremonial preparation vs. natural desiccation ==
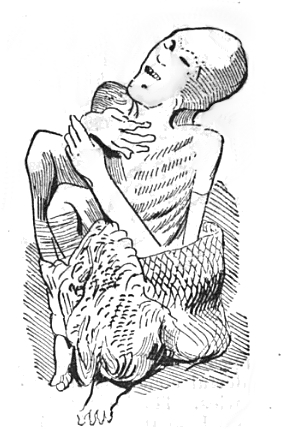
Aztec mummies were often placed in a seated position

Distinctions must be made between intentionally prepared Aztec mummies and mummies resulting from natural desiccation. Prepared Aztec mummy “bundles” consist of the remains of the deceased placed in a woven bag or wrap which was often adorned with a ceremonial mask. Most of the more widely known examples of Aztec mummies, which formed the basis of popular traveling exhibitions and museum exhibits in the 19th century, were likely the product of natural desiccation rather than an intentional mummification process.

Unlike Egyptian mummies, which were typically placed in an extended supine position within a sarcophagus, Aztec mummies were typically placed in seated positions. To maintain the pose of the body, the remains were often secured within a cloth wrapping, sometimes with rope.

== Symbolism in Aztec hieroglyphs ==
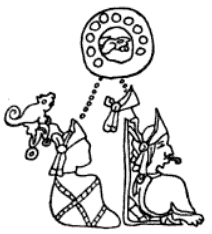
A hieroglyph depicting the mummy of the deceased Aztec ruler, Ahuitzotl, followed by his living successor.

A mummy is the Aztec hieroglyph for death. In Aztec written documentation of historical events, such as the death of a ruler or warrior, a mummy glyph will be connected to a glyph denoting the person's name and another glyph denoting the year of the event.

The pictured example of Aztec hieroglyphs shows the mummy of a human figure bound with ropes, with a crown on its head, indicating the death of a ruler. The small water-animal attached to the crown by a cord shows that the dead ruler's name was Ahuitzotl, that being the Aztec word for "water-animal". The right half of the glyph shows a man seated upon a dais, with a crown on his head and a speech-scroll issuing from his mouth. The Aztec word for ruler was "tlahtouani", "he who speaks", shown graphically by the speech-scroll. Finally both figures are attached by cords to the circle above, which represents the year "10-Rabbit" (1502 A.D.), indicating the date of this event.

== Cultural references ==
In the late 19th century, resurrected Aztec mummies replaced their Egyptian counterparts in popular American stories such as The Squaw Hollow Sensation, which appeared in 1879 and told the story of "the discovery and revival of a 1000-year-old Aztec mummy". Aztec mummy-themed stories continued in American novels, films, comic books, and television throughout the 20th century and into the 21st century. Notable examples include fictional confrontations between Aztec mummies and the Lone Ranger (comic book), Kolchak: The Night Stalker (television), and Mil Mascaras vs. the Aztec Mummy (film).

Aztec mummy-themed horror films produced in Mexico include La Momia Azteca, which was the first of a trilogy of films produced in 1957 featuring a resurrected Aztec warrior named Popoca, followed by The Curse of the Aztec Mummy and The Robot vs. The Aztec Mummy. The later film Wrestling Women vs. the Aztec Mummy (1964) featured a resurrected Aztec warrior named Tezomoc, and Mexican mummies were again featured in The Mummies of Guanajuato. Unlike the Aztec mummies appearing in most American film and television productions, which are typically mummified as part of a ceremonial process similar to Egyptian mummies, Mexican horror films typically involve the resurrection of naturally desiccated Aztec warriors. The 2007 American film Mil Mascaras vs. the Aztec Mummy, starring the aforementioned Mexican superstar wrestler Mil Máscaras, features the ceremonial resurrection of a mummy in a sarcophagus that is more reminiscent of Egyptian mummies than Aztec ones.
