= Susan's Big Day =

- Directed by: Jeffrey Uhlmann
- Written by: Jeffrey Uhlmann
- Starring: Jeffrey Uhlmann (voices)
- Release date: 2010
- Running time: 4 minutes
- Country: United States
- Language: English

Susan's Big Day is a 2010 absurdist animated short film that was originally directed and written by Jeffrey Uhlmann in 1983. It tells the story of a pivotal event in the life of a young girl, Susan, on the day of her mother's date with a fire chief.

== Plot ==
A young girl, Susan, is helping clean the kitchen prior to her mother's date with the Fire Chief. Susan suggests to her mother that they throw out an old box of birdseed that has been cluttering a cabinet since the death of their pet bird. When the Fire Chief arrives at the house to watch television with Susan's mother, Susan asks if she can offer them any snacks. The Fire Chief appreciates the offer and asks if she has any birdseed.

== Reception ==
The film achieved popularity on the festival circuit while opening for the film Mil Mascaras vs. the Aztec Mummy before being selected to open the final night of the inaugural 2010 Black Rock City Burning Man film festival.
