= The Mummy Theme Park =

2000 Italian film by Alvaro Passeri

- Region 2 DVD cover
- Directed by: Alvaro Passeri
- Screenplay by: Alvaro Passeri; Antony Pedicini
- Story by: Alvaro Passeri; Antony Pedicini
- Produced by: Alvaro Passeri
- Starring: Adam O'Neil; Holly Laningham; Cyrus Elias; Helen Preest; Peter Boom
- Cinematography: David Williams
- Edited by: Gianfranco Amicucci
- Music by: Stefano Panunzi
- Production company: Production Film 82
- Release date: 2000
- Running time: 88 minutes
- Country: Italy
- Language: English

The Mummy Theme Park is a 2000 English-language Italian horror adventure film directed, produced and co-written by Alvaro Passeri. The film's plot centers around an underground amusement park in Egypt built on the tomb of a pharaoh, and an ancient curse that leads to the park's animatronic mummies being brought back to life and wreaking havoc.

== Plot ==
Nekhebet, a descendent of Cleopatra named after the ancient Egyptian goddess, wishes to revive the ancient culture, religion, and monarchical government of Egypt in the modern day. She prays to the gods Osiris and Ra, causing an earthquake that opens a deep fissure in the Egyptian desert, leading to the discovery of a subterranean necropolis with a tomb belonging to a pharaoh who once ruled both Upper and Lower Egypt. Lecherous businessman Sheik El Sahid orders that the tomb be opened, in spite of his associate Professor Mason reading hieroglyphics which warn of an ancient curse that will be unleashed if the tomb is disturbed. El Sahid converts the site into an underground amusement park known as the Mummy Theme Park, and invites American photographer Daniel Flynn and his assistant Julie to visit and publicise the venture.

Daniel and Julie arrive at El Sahid's palace, where they are shown to their bedrooms by Nekhebet, who works with El Sahid despite refusing his lustful advances towards her. After being offended by Julie's ignorance of Egyptian culture, Nekhebet beseeches Osiris to enact vengeance on Julie and Daniel. Daniel awakes to a souvenir wrapped in papyrus being thrown through the window of his room. The next day, El Sahid takes Daniel and Julie on a behind-the-scenes tour of the Mummy Theme Park, where they see ancient Egyptian mummies being augmented with animatronic parts and microchips which allow park personnel to control the mummies from a monitoring room. Daniel and Julie join El Sahid on an educational train ride about daily life in ancient Egypt. One of El Sahid's guardsmen learns that Nekhebet is seeking to sabotage the park; she becomes aware of this and prays to Osiris, resulting in the guard violently transforming into a snake.

Some time later, Daniel brings the papyrus thrown through his window to Professor Mason, who translates hieroglyphics inscribed on it as a warning describing the ancient curse and stating that the park's existence offends the memory of the pharaohs. Nekhebet activates one of the robotically enhanced mummies, who arms himself with a sword and kills several of El Sahid's guardsmen before disappearing through a portal. Daniel and Julie take photographs of the different scenes featured on the educational ride, including an area where riders meet the pharaoh in whose tomb the park was built. The flash of Daniel's camera causes the microchip in the pharaoh-mummy's head to malfunction, and the pharaoh begins chasing Daniel and Julie through the ride.

The pharaoh corners Julie and Daniel, but is distracted by Julie's breasts, allowing Daniel to grab a nearby container of acid and pour it onto the pharaoh, causing his wraps and skin to dissolve. His skeleton continues chasing Daniel and Julie, but Daniel crushes it with a large rock. El Sahid's guardsmen find Daniel and Julie, restrain them, and bring them to El Sahid, who apologizes to them for the pharaoh-mummy running amok. The following day, El Sahid stages a photoshoot with himself, the pharaoh-mummy, and Professor Mason, but Nekhebet arrives and calls upon the Egyptian gods to reseal the fissure in which the park was built. As the ride begins to collapse, other mummies awaken and kill several more of El Sahid's guardsmen as well as Professor Mason.

Julie hacks into the park's computer system using her laptop, and she and Daniel escape on one of the park's trains. El Sahid is encased in mummy wraps while still alive, and Nekhebet, having overheard Daniel expressing sympathy towards her view of the Mummy Theme Park as an affront to the pharaohs, bids him and Julie farewell. Once above ground, Daniel and Julie kiss, and Nekhebet is seen sitting and cuddling with a pharaoh.

== Cast ==
- Adam O'Neil as Daniel Flynn
- Holly Laningham as Julie
- Cyrus Elias as Sheik
- Helen Preest as Nekhebet
- Peter Boom as Professor Mason

== Reception ==
In 2014, Milwaukee Public Museum curator and anthropologist Carter Lupton listed The Mummy Theme Park as being among a number of "amateurish efforts" belonging to the subgenre of mummy films. The following year, author Clive Davies wrote that, "This bizarre, ultra-low budget horror adventure (comedy?) has some real laughable sets and FX, but on the other hand has some oddly effective moments that make you think that the filmmakers have their tongues firmly in cheek." In 2024, author Bryan Senn referred to The Mummy Theme Park as "[an] execrable Westworld wannabe".

In 2026, it was one of four titles featured as part of Mystery Science Theater 3000: The RiffTrax Experiments.

== See also ==
- Kemetism – a neopagan religion and revival of ancient Egyptian religion
