= Unscented optimal control =

Mathematics concept

In mathematics, unscented optimal control combines the notion of the unscented transform with deterministic optimal control to address a class of uncertain optimal control problems. It is a specific application of tychastic optimal control theory, which is a generalization of Riemmann-Stieltjes optimal control theory, a concept introduced by Ross and his coworkers.

== Mathematical description ==
Suppose that the initial state $x^0$ of a dynamical system,

$\dot{x} = f(x, u, t)$

is an uncertain quantity. Let $\Chi^i$ be the sigma points. Then sigma-copies of the dynamical system are given by,

$\dot\Chi^i = f(\Chi^i, u, t)$

Applying standard deterministic optimal control principles to this ensemble generates an unscented optimal control. Unscented optimal control is a special case of tychastic optimal control theory. According to Aubin and Ross, tychastic processes differ from stochastic processes in that a tychastic process is conditionally deterministic.

== Applications ==
Unscented optimal control theory has been applied to UAV guidance, spacecraft attitude control, air-traffic control and low-thrust trajectory optimization
