= Chip Gubera =

American film director and producer (born 1975)

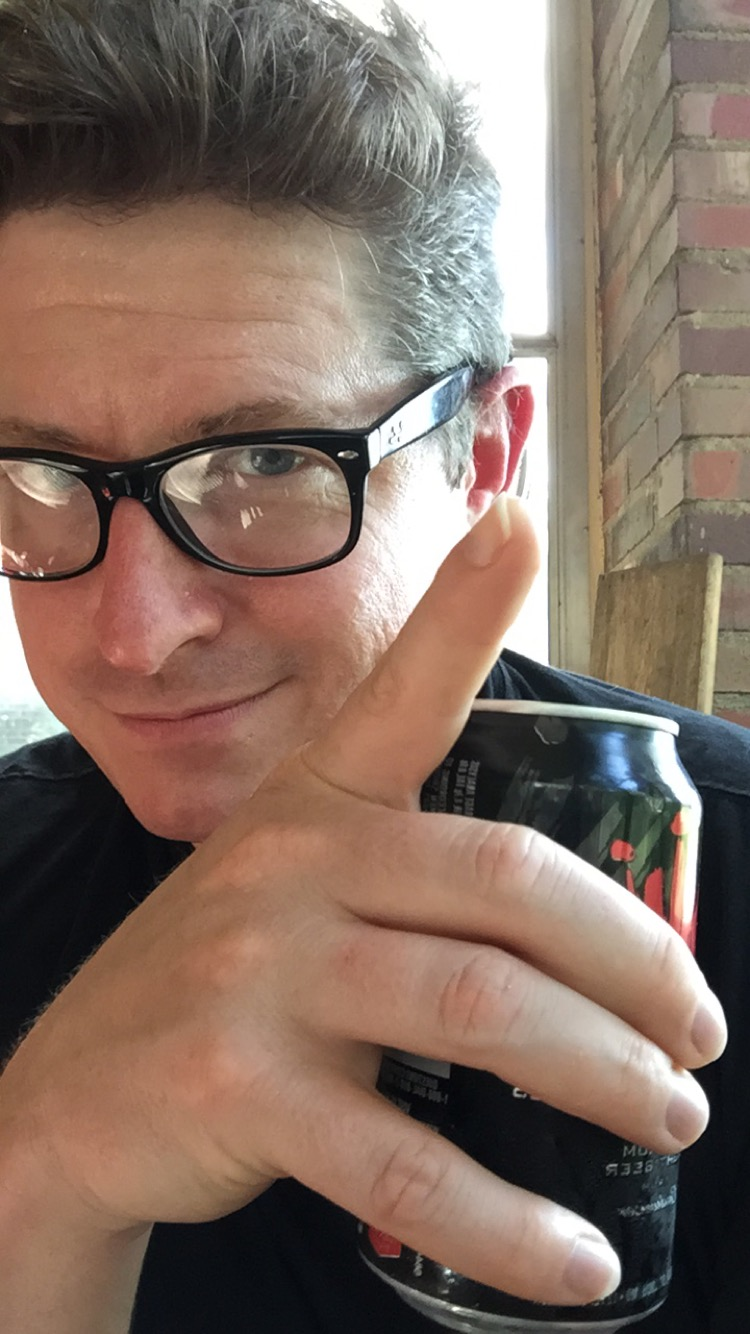
- Gubera in 2015
- Born: Christopher Charles Gubera; October 7, 1975; Joplin, Missouri, U.S.
- Education: Joplin High School, 1994; University of Missouri, BA 1999; University of Missouri, MEd 2009
- Occupations: Film director, producer, professor
- Years active: 2001 – present

Chip Gubera is an American film director and producer. He also teaches digital media technology at the University of Missouri in the IT Program.

== Personal life ==
Chip Gubera currently lives in Columbia, Missouri, where he teaches digital media technology in the Information Technology Program at the University of Missouri. He also freelances as a visual effects/motion graphics artist and a music composer.

== Film ==
In the last 10 years Chip Gubera has directed and/or produced five feature films and over 30 short films, 17 of which have been accepted at film festivals around the world. Eight of these films have won awards at festivals worldwide and three have had distribution. A short film titled Song of the Dead was released in 2004 on Fangoria magazine's Blood Drive hosted by Rob Zombie. From the short film came the feature-length zombie-musical also titled Song of the Dead. Song of the Dead, Gubera's first feature film starring Reggie Bannister (Phantasm series and Bubba Ho-Tep), has currently been screened at several national and international festivals and has won awards in the US, Spain, and Argentina.

Gubera directed two feature films with the University of Missouri starring Mexican masked wrestler Mil Máscaras. The film was entitled Academy of Doom. He replaced Jeff Burr as director of Mil Mascaras Vs. The Aztec Mummy in 2008. Both of these films screened at festivals around the world. In the summer of 2009, both Song of the Dead and Mil Mascaras Vs. The Aztec Mummy found a limited US theatrical release. In 2010 Mil Mascaras Vs. The Aztec Mummy was screened to an enthusiastic audience at the Fantasia Film Festival.

Gubera won Best Visual Effects at the St. Louis Filmmaker's Showcase 2010 for a short film called A Christmas Prayer. The film mixed live action with animated sets.

In 2011, Gubera's home town of Joplin, Missouri, was destroyed by a massive tornado. He documented the event with a feature documentary called Joplin, Missouri - A Tornado Story. The film was narrated by Cost to Cost AM radio host George Noory. The film picked up a number of honors including winning Best Feature Documentary at the 2012 St. Louis Filmmaker's Showcase and being nominated for a 2013 Mid-America Emmy.

In the Summer of 2014, Gubera produced and directed the horror feature film Slasher.com. The film is currently in post production. The film stars R.A. Mihailoff, Jewel Shepard, Delious Kennedy from the R&B group All-4-One, Ben Kaplan and Morgan Carter.
