= Sharon Twomey =

Irish actress

- Born: July 21, 1964 (age 61)
- Occupation: Actress

Sharon Twomey (born 21 July 1964), often credited as Sharon Marino, is an Irish actress. She made her screen debut with a minor role in the 1988 film A Fish Called Wanda.

== Career ==
In 1988, at the age of 24, Twomey played the role of a first junior barrister on the defence counsel in A Fish Called Wanda. The same year she appeared in one episode ("A Present from Dublin") of All Creatures Great and Small, in which she played Molly McFeely, a short-term girlfriend of John McGlynn's character, Calum Buchanan, in addition to being the housekeeper of Skeldale House. The following year, Twomey had another minor role, in Wonderworks: Young Charlie Chaplin, as a chorus girl.

In 1997 she appeared as Linda Murnaghan in the Glenroe episode "Miley's New Bullock". In 2005 Twomey appeared in the Italian television series Il giudice Mastrangelo, as Jane Allison. Her last-known appearance was in another Italian television series, Capri, as Jane.
