= R. A. Mihailoff =

American actor

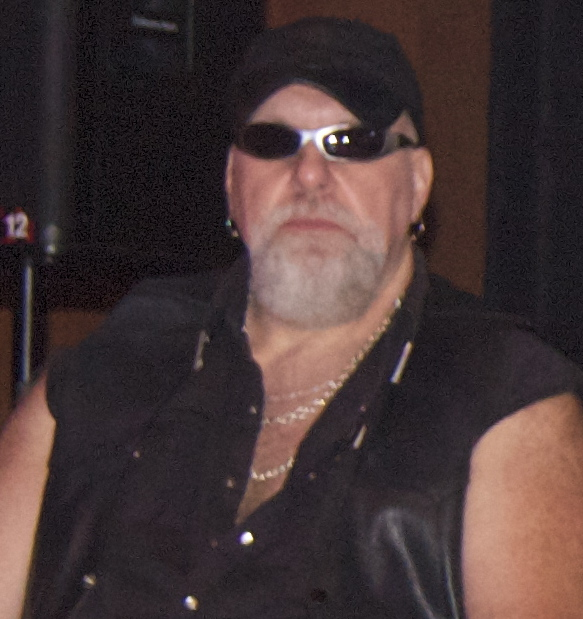
- Mihailoff in 2012.
- Born: Randal Allen Mihailoff; July 31, 1956 (age 69); Townville, Pennsylvania, U.S.
- Occupations: Actor, professional wrestler
- Years active: 1980–present

Randal Allen Mihailoff (born July 31, 1956) is an American actor and former professional wrestler.

== Career ==
Mihailoff's first role was in the 1980 science fiction film The Lathe of Heaven. He is best known for portraying Leatherface in the film Leatherface: The Texas Chainsaw Massacre III, the third in The Texas Chain Saw Massacre series of movies.

== Paranormal group ==
In his free time, Mihailoff has ghost hunted in a paranormal group called the Hollywood Ghost Hunters. It is a "group of people who normally make a living by trying to scare other people. Everybody in the group has something to do with horror movies." The group was founded by Kane "Jason" Hodder, who played the lead role of Jason Voorhees in the Friday the 13th series, and his partner Rick "Stuntman" McCullum, a Hollywood stuntman and actor who doubles for horror film actors like Sid Haig. They formed the team after filming Fallen Angels at Mansfield Reformatory, where they claim to have had a paranormal experience in one of the cell blocks.

On January 7, 2011, Hollywood Ghost Hunters was featured on the "Pico House" episode of Travel Channel's Ghost Adventures.

== Filmography ==
Year	Title	Role	Notes
1980	The Lathe of Heaven	Orderly	TV movie
1982	Divided We Fall	Union Soldier	Film
1985	Moving Violations	Farmer #2	Film
1988	Highway to Heaven	Biker #1	TV episode: "A Dolphin Song for Lee: Part 1"
1988	License to Drive	Tow Truck Driver	Film
1990	Leatherface: The Texas Chainsaw Massacre III	Junior Sawyer / Leatherface	Film
1990	Parker Lewis Can't Lose	Bronc Adelson	TV episode: "Deja Dudes
1991	Full House	"Tiny"	TV episode: "Gotta Dance"
1992	Adventures in Dinosaur City	Mr. Big	Film
1992	Eddie Presley	Psycho In Asylum	Film
1992	Trancers III	"Shark"	Video
1994	Death Riders	Munch	Film
1994	Pumpkinhead II: Blood Wings	"Red" Byers	Video
1995	With Criminal Intent	"Tiny"	Film
1995	Stripteaser	Little	Film
1996	Where Truth Lies	The Trucker	Film
1997	Drive	Singing Trucker	Film
1999	The Kid with X-ray Eyes	Newton, The Biker	Video
2001	The Vampire Hunters Club	Doorman	Video (short)
2003	The Saw Is Family: Making 'Leatherface'	Himself	Video documentary (short)
2006	Fallen Angels	"Anger"	Film (Associate Producer)
2007	Have Love, Will Travel	Luther	Film
2007	Revamped	Big Bad Bouncer	Video
2008	Blood Scarab	Dungeon Master	Video (uncredited)
2008	Stiletto	"Big Arms", Nazi Biker	Film
2009	Dark House	Brutal Butcher	Film
2010	Small Town Saturday Night	Jimmie	Film
2010	Hatchet II	Trent	Film
2011	Knifepoint	Old Boy	Film
2011	Horrorween	The Bouncer	Film
2011	Hooked	The Fisherman	Film (short)
2011	Alluvial	Dr. Henry	Film
2011	The Pod	Frank "Big Frank"	Film
2013	Kiss Before the Slaughter	James	Film (short)
2014	Smothered	Himself	Film
2017	Slasher.com	Jesse	Film
2017	Death House	Prison Leader	Film
