= Alvaro Passeri =

Italian effects artist and film director

- Occupations: Special effects artist; film director
- Years active: 1979–

Alvaro Passeri, also known as Al Passeri, is an Italian special effects artist and film director, known for directing Creatures from the Abyss (1994), The Mummy Theme Park (2000), and Flight to Hell (2003). He also contributed special effects on the films Tentacles (1977) and Madhouse (1981).

== Partial filmography ==
=== As director ===
Year	Title	Notes	Ref(s)
1994	Creatures from the Abyss	Also known as Plankton	
2000	The Mummy Theme Park		
2003	Flight to Hell		
