= Mil Máscaras =

Mexican professional wrestler (born 1942)

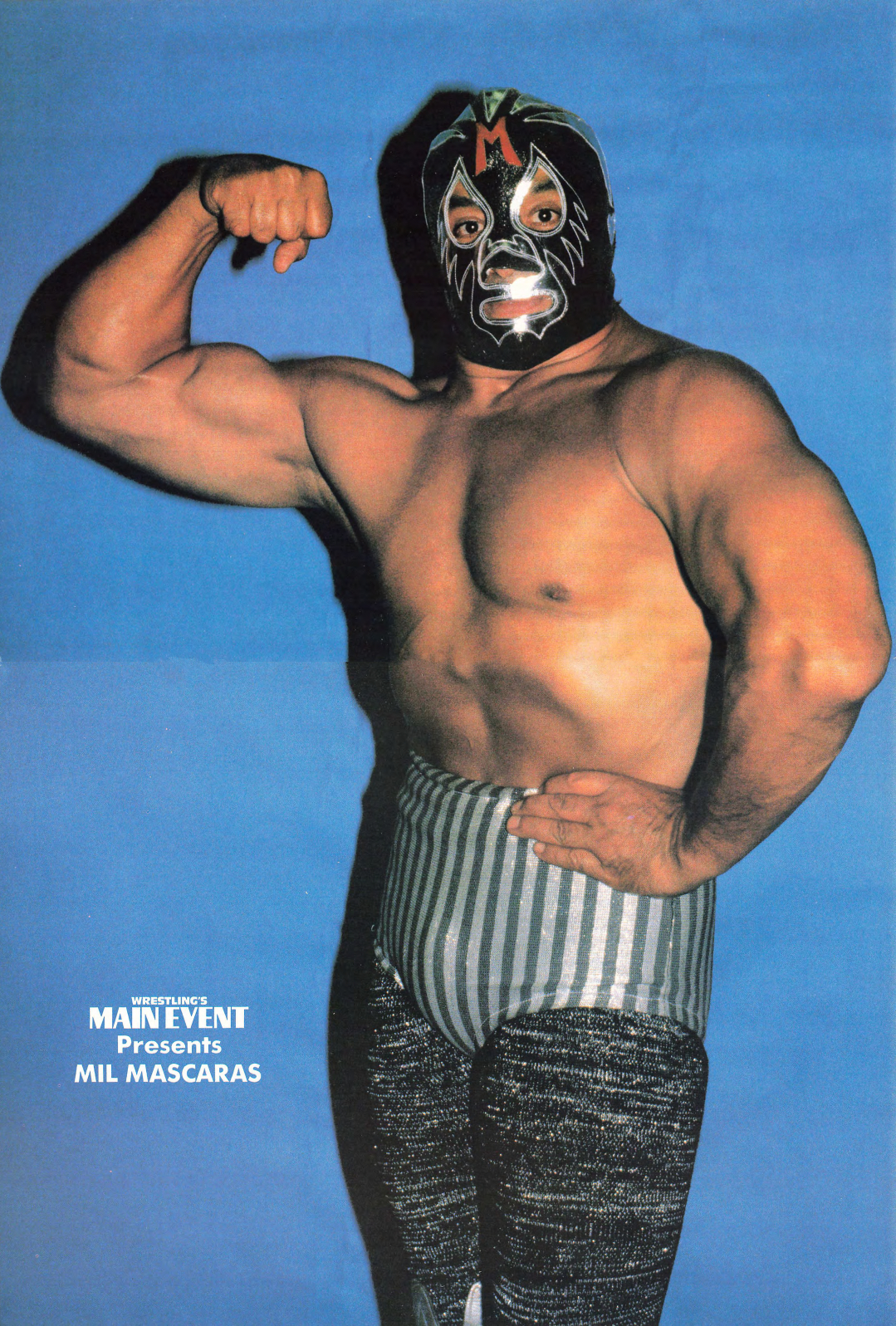
- Máscaras in 1983

Personal information
- Born: Aarón Rodríguez Arellano; July 15, 1942 (age 84) San Luis Potosí, San Luis Potosí, Mexico
- Family: Dos Caras (brother); Sicodélico (brother); Alberto Del Rio (nephew); El Hijo de Dos Caras (nephew); Sicodelico Jr. (nephew); Hijo de Sicodelico (nephew)

Professional wrestling career
- Ring name: Mil Máscaras
- Billed height: 5 ft 11 in (180 cm)
- Billed weight: 245 lb (111 kg)
- Trained by: Diablo Velasco; José Hérmes
- Debut: July 20, 1963
- Retired: March 9, 2019

Mil Máscaras (born Aarón Rodríguez Arellano, July 15, 1942) is a retired Mexican professional wrestler and actor. He is regarded as one of the greatest legends in history of professional wrestling in Mexico – along with El Santo and Blue Demon – and has been described as the first international superstar of the style of professional wrestling known as lucha libre, the first to popularize it outside of his country. Mil Máscaras is considered one of the most influential wrestlers of all time for enhancing and popularizing the lucha libre style around the world, both in the ring and as the star of 20 films. He is also an accomplished artist and cultural ambassador for his native country and has appeared on three of its postage stamps. Although he has never been unmasked and his true identity is generally kept a secret out of respect for lucha libre traditions, his real name is known due to appearing in the credits of the films he has starred in. His ring name is Spanish for "Thousand Masks".

Mil Máscaras was inducted into the Professional Wrestling Hall of Fame in 2010, and the WWE Hall of Fame in 2012. He is a member of one of Mexico's most prominent wrestling families; his brothers José and Pablo respectively wrestle as Dos Caras and Sicodélico. José's oldest son Alberto is a former WWE Champion and currently wrestles as Alberto El Patron. José's younger son Guillermo wrestles as El Hijo de Dos Caras. Pablo's son Aaron is better known as Sicodelico Jr.

== Professional wrestling career ==
Mil Máscaras made his professional wrestling debut on July 20, 1963, in Pachuca. He became popular in Mexico for being one of the best conditioned professional wrestler in the heavyweight division, which was dominated by foreigners at the time. It was also his size which permitted him to wrestle in the US and Japan under the heavyweight division. Mil Máscaras was one of the first masked luchadores outside of Mexico to play a non-heel role. He rarely resorted to rule breaking, instead relying on his repertoire of moves and counter-moves. Mil Máscaras was also one of the first wrestlers to introduce the high-flying moves of lucha libre, such as the plancha and tope suicida, to Japanese fans. This brought him international fame as one of the first high-flyers, something he was not considered in Mexico where he fell under the mat-power category.

Mil Máscaras made his international wrestling debut in 1968 at the Olympic Auditorium in Los Angeles, getting involved in rivalries against the likes of Ernie Ladd, John Tolos, Black Gordman and Goliath. In Mexico City, he unmasked El Halcon in a triangular tournament that included Alfonso Dantés in the 1970s. Owing to the limited spread of news at the time, he repeated the feat in a Japanese ring, winning by submission.

Mil Máscaras performed for All Japan Pro Wrestling (AJPW) during the '70s. In his Japanese debut on February 19, 1971, he defeated Kantaro Hoshino in Tokyo. It was during this time that he had his best-known international feud with American masked wrestler The Destroyer. During the '70s, Mil Máscaras also had feuds with Mexican wrestlers such as TNT, Canek, El Halcon, and Angel Blanco. These feuds took place mostly in Mexico and the US and were broadcast on Spanish language stations in the US, Mil Máscaras was also the heavyweight champion of the IWA wrestling promotion, which was founded by Eddie Einhorn, and still holds the title to this day.

In 1974, Mil Máscaras was the World Champion of the short-lived International Wrestling Association promotion based in New York City. He had major title defenses against competitors such as Ivan Koloff and Ernie Ladd.

Mil Máscaras appeared in World Wrestling Federation (WWF, now called WWE). He performed at Madison Square Garden several times after a ban on masked wrestlers was lifted for him, making him the first masked wrestler in the Garden, he defeated The Spoiler (who was not permitted to wear his mask). During this time, he feuded with Superstar Billy Graham over the WWF World Heavyweight Championship.

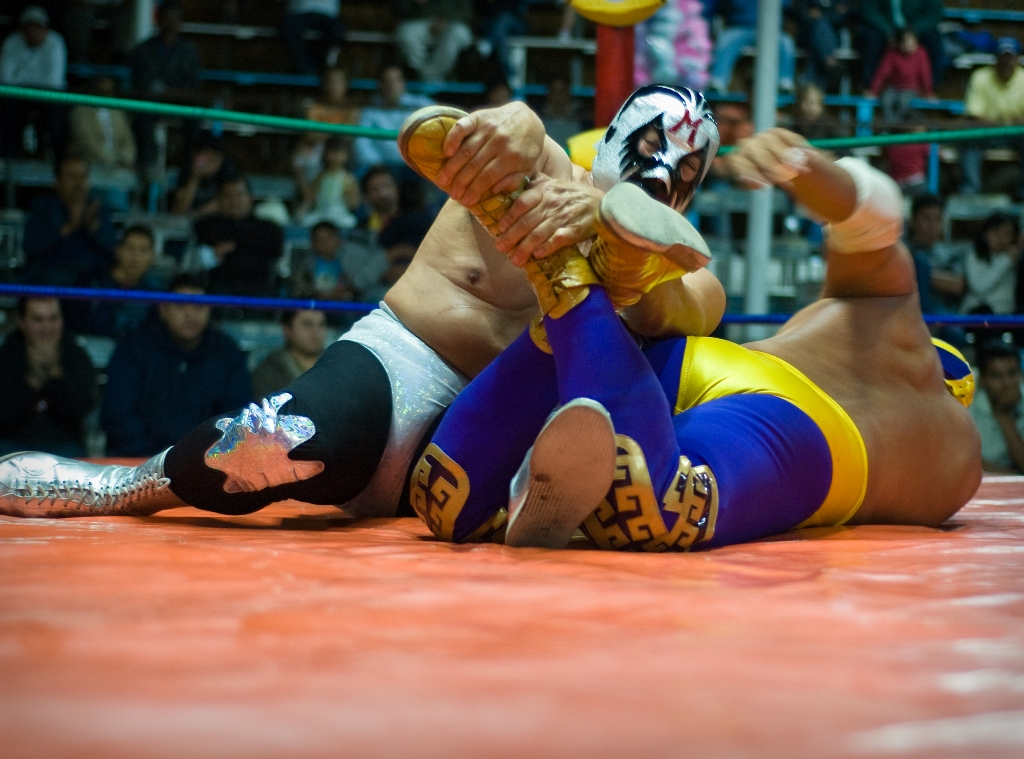
Mil Máscaras wrestling one of his greatest rivals, Canek, in 2009

Mil Máscaras made many appearances during the 80s and the 90s at the World Wrestling Council in Puerto Rico. He also wrestled in World Championship Wrestling (WCW), where his most notable match was a match with Cactus Jack at Clash of the Champions X: Texas Shootout on February 6, 1990, in the Memorial Coliseum in Corpus Christi, Texas.

On September 10, 1991, at the age of 49, Mil Máscaras won his final title, the WWA (Mexico) World Heavyweight Championship. He held the title until 1994 and assumed a state of semi-retirement after his final reign.

Mil Máscaras' first American pay-per-view appearance was competing in WWF's 1997 Royal Rumble match. He eliminated himself, diving off the top rope out of the ring onto Pierroth Jr., whom he himself had just eliminated. Such a move is common in lucha libre, but it is technically a mistake in the Royal Rumble as it leads to elimination.

On December 5, 2002, Mil Máscaras defeated Manny Fernandez at the inaugural show for Legacy Wrestling Enterprises in Fort Worth, Texas. On July 25, 2013, he celebrated his 50th in-ring anniversary to the day by teaming with his brother Sicodelico and his nephew El Hijo De Dos Caras to face one of his greatest rivals, Canek, along with Negro Navarro and Rey Bucanero in a special six-man tag.

His last match was on March 9, 2019, at 76 years old, when he teamed with Dragon Lee and Captain Atomo defeating Rey Bucanero, La Bestia Del Ring and Valiente in Acapulco, Mexico.

== Acting career ==
Mil Máscaras also starred in a series of 20 luchador action films beginning with his self-titled debut in 1966 at age 24. In 1966, Mexican movie producer Luis Enrique Vergara was looking for a new masked to star in his wrestling/horror movies which were then the rage of Mexican cinema. Mil Máscaras was the first Lucha Libre personality that was created specifically to be a movie star, since his whole persona and flashy look was designed initially for the movies. (His real-life wrestling career followed and grew out of the excitement generated by his film appearances.)

Vergara's two regular movie stars had suddenly become unavailable. El Santo had walked out on him over a contract dispute, and Blue Demon was injured unexpectedly and would require a prolonged time-out. Not wanting to stop making his successful cinematic quickies, Vergara decided to transform Lucha Libre newcomer Mil Máscaras as the star of his next two movies. Mil began a movie career that has continued to this day, appearing in a total of 20 Mexican horror/wrestling/action films.

The first film, simply entitled Mil Máscaras (1966) was shot in black & white and made Mil out to be a sort of super-hero. The film gave Mil Máscaras a comic book-style origin story, which seems to have been somewhat swiped from the then-popular Doc Savage pulp novels that were selling very well in science-fiction bookstores in the mid-60's. According to the script, Mil was an infant who was found clutched in his dead mother's arms in a war-torn area of Europe during World War 2 and was sent to an orphanage. A group of scientists (not affiliated with any particular country) adopts the boy, secretly using him as a guinea pig, subjecting the child to an intensive regimen of physical exercise and mental training as he matures.

By the time he reached adulthood, Mil Máscaras had completed extensive physical and mental training. The scientists then send him out into the world to help downtrodden people and to fight criminals as a vigilante.

The plots of the first two films were rather lackluster. In both Mil Máscaras (1966) and its sequel Los Canallas (also 1966), Mil gets to fight a rather ordinary gang of thugs and a crooked fight promoter who are bullying the locals in some backwater burg in Mexico. Mil's second film Los Canallas and all of them thereafter were shot in Color.

Federico Curiel directed Mil Máscaras' next two films in 1968, both of which feature American horror star John Carradine as a bad guy. Mil's missions were becoming a bit more meaningful by this time. In Enigma of Death, Mil faces off against Carradine who plays the leader of an underground Nazi organization (who disguises himself as a circus clown!), while in Las Vampiras, Mil goes up against a secret cult of female vampires led by a very manic Carradine.

In 1970, Curiel directed Mil Máscaras in two of his team-up movies. The Mummies of Guanajuato teamed Mil up with both Blue Demon and El Santo in what became the highest-grossing Mexican wrestler film of all time, pitting the three enmascarados against a group of re-animated mummies.

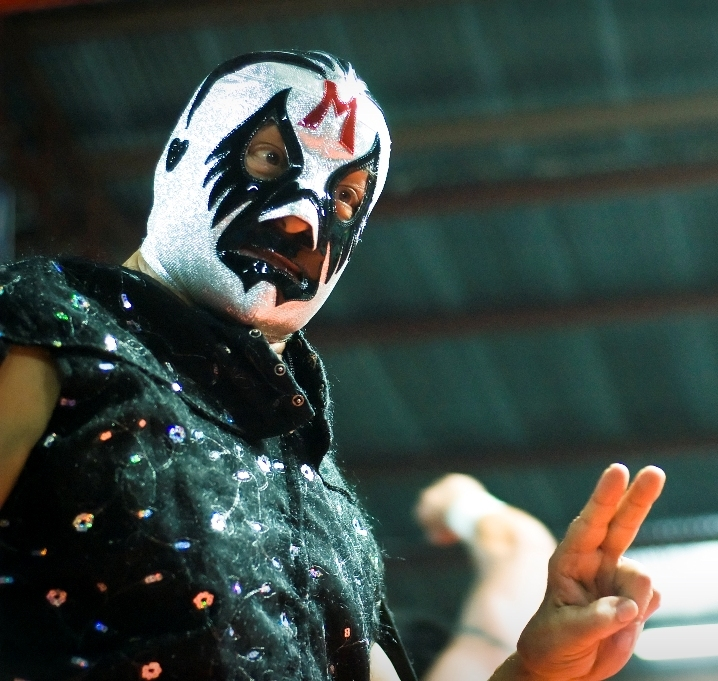
Mil Máscaras in 2009

The Champions of Justice (also 1970) saw Mil Máscaras in action with fellow wrestlers Blue Demon, Tinieblas, El Medico Asesino and La Sombra Vengadora (who all joined as sort of a super-team to fight monsters, mad scientists, criminals, evil dwarves or whatever else crossed their paths.) The producers employed a gaggle of masked midget wrestlers in a number of their luchador films in the 70s.

Over the next few years, a number of other team-up movies were made, most co-starring Mil Máscaras, who by this time was becoming the "King of the Team-up Movies". Champions of Justice Return (1972) was very similar to the first Champions film, only with El Fantasma Blanco sitting in for El Medico Asesino, El Rayo de Jalisco replacing Tinieblas, and El Avispon Escarlata replacing La Sombra Vengadora. (Mil didn't appear in the third and final "Champions" film because it would've involved traveling to a foreign country where it was filmed.)

However, in 1973, he teamed up again with Tinieblas and El Fantasma Blanco in two more films, Macabre Legends of the Colony and The Mummies of San Angel (which both resemble "Champions Of Justice" films, in spite of the Blue Demon's conspicuous absence from the casts). Theft of the Mummies of Guanajuato (1972) teamed up Mil with the Blue Angel and El Rayo De Jalisco.

Mil Máscaras then co-starred with super-star strongman Sergio Oliva in Black Power (1973). He fought alongside the then-famous Superzan in Vampires of Coyoacan (1973) and later joined forces once again with El Santo and Blue Demon in 1977's Mystery in Bermuda, which most Mexi-cinema fans consider to be the last real entry in the then fading Mexican wrestling/horror genre.

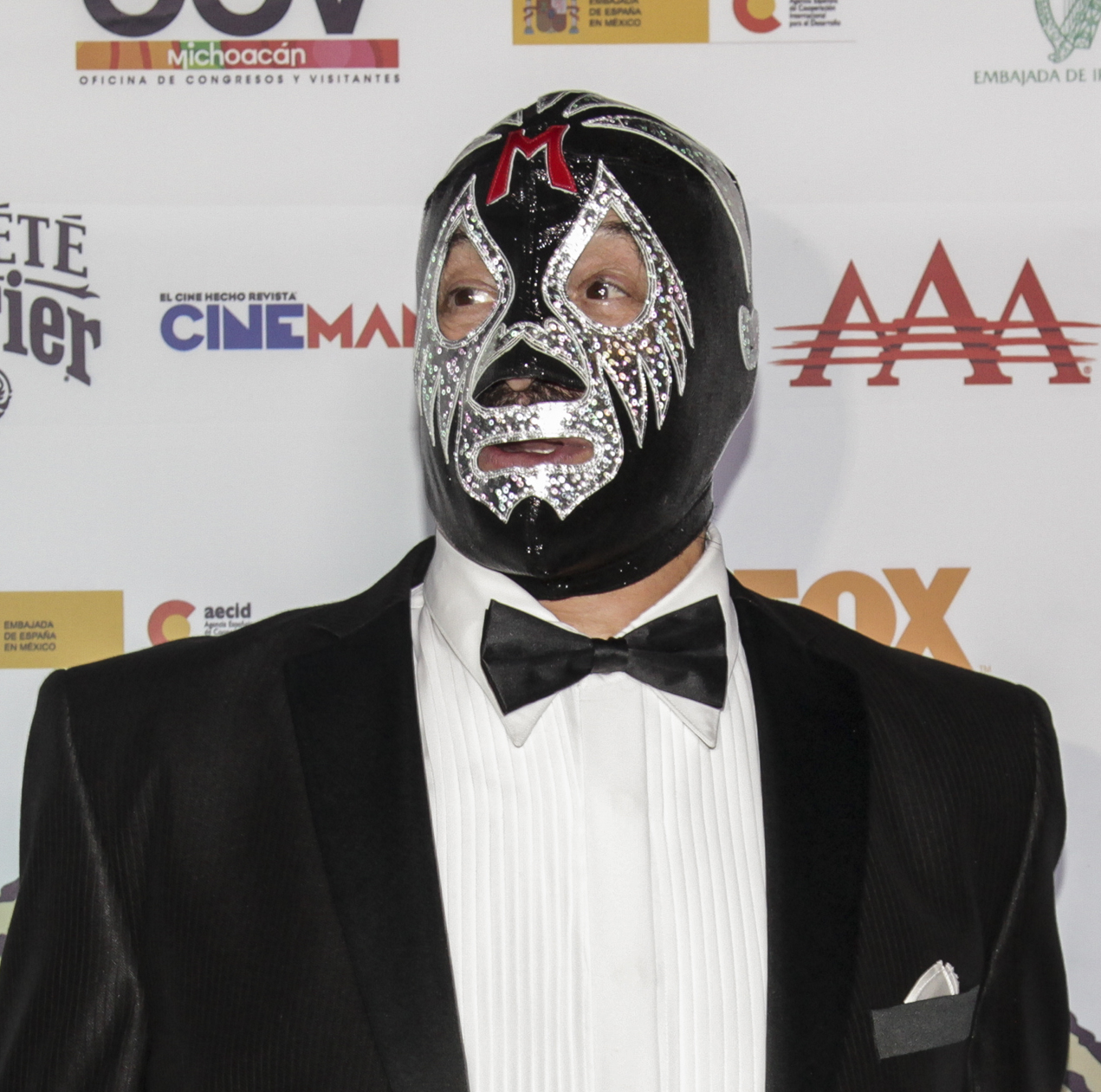
Mil Máscaras in 2012

He also appeared in a solo movie of his own, A Rose in the Ring (1972) and years later, he even teamed up with Santo's son El Hijo del Santo in The Lawless Frontier (1983), making Mil Máscaras the only Mexican superhero to ever co-star with both Santos, father and son. In the late 80's, Mil appeared in two more wrestling films, La Verdad de la Lucha and La Llave Mortal.

In 2024 a Salvadoran bodybuilder Edgar Alexis Pineda played Mil Máscaras in the Salvadoran movie "3 Grandes Personajes" also known in the United States as "Samurai Jack and Mil Máscaras vs. Yumi".

Mil's film career lay dormant after 1990 for 17 years, but he more recently resumed appearing in movies. In 2007, Mil Máscaras starred in Mil Mascaras vs. the Aztec Mummy (also known as Mil Mascaras: Resurrection), the first lucha film featuring any of the so-called "Big Three" stars of the genre (Máscaras, Blue Demon, Santo) to be produced in English. The film screened at festivals around the world garnering awards and award nominations along with positive critical reviews. The film enjoyed almost continuous popularity and publicity for several years after its debut, including two magazine cover articles as late as 2012. He also appeared in a 2008 film entitled Academy of Doom, and a 2015 film called Aztec Revenge.

== Public profile ==
=== Reputation ===
Mil Máscaras has drawn criticism from fellow wrestlers such as Mick Foley and Chris Jericho for his unwillingness to sell moves and put opponents over. In a 2007 shoot interview, Superstar Billy Graham said that, during their series of matches, Mil Máscaras was unwilling to sell properly.

Mil Máscaras has attributed these claims to cultural differences in the sport, saying:

One problem is that in the U.S. some wrestlers focus more on their image than their skills. I understand because I understand the business. I don't criticize them for that, but they should understand that for me wrestling means something more. If a guy doesn't execute a move, I don't pretend that he did. If I miss a move, then I don't ask anyone to make me look good.

— Mil Máscaras, Filmfax, pp.51–52, issue 1, 2012

== Legacy ==
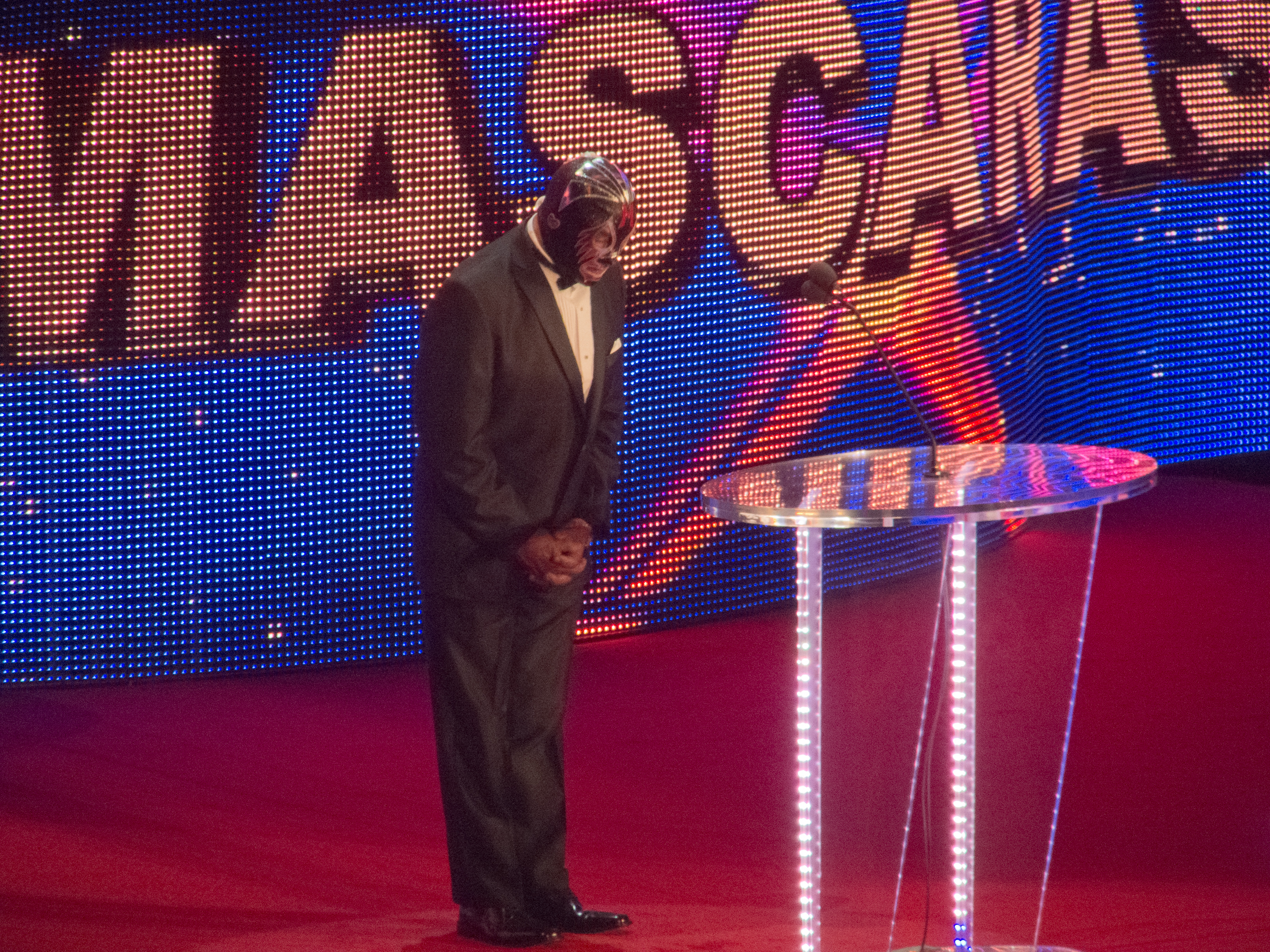
Mil Máscaras during his speech of induction at the 2012 WWE Hall of Fame

In 1975, Mil Máscaras was voted as "The Most Popular Wrestler of the Year" by the company that now publishes the US magazine Pro Wrestling Illustrated. Satoru Sayama, the original Tiger Mask, has described Mil Máscaras' impact on Japanese professional wrestling, "If it weren't for Mil Máscaras, there would be no Jushin Liger, no Último Dragón or the Great Sasuke today,". Mil Máscaras' success in the US also paved the way for other luchadors such as Rey Mysterio Jr., who has become one of the most popular luchadors in US wrestling. Even after reaching the age of 70, Mil Máscaras continues to perform sporadically. In 2001, he was inducted into the Southern California Pro-Wrestling Hall of Fame.

In 2006, Mil Máscaras was honored by the Cauliflower Alley Club, a fraternal organization of both retired and active wrestlers. The Destroyer, one of Mil Máscaras' legendary rivals, presented him with an award at the event. The Destroyer also commented on Mil Máscaras' wrestling style, "He was the best competitor that I ever wrestled. He never gave you anything – it's true – but I didn't give him anything either. You talk about a shoot or a half-shoot, and that's the kind of match that it was."

On October 7, 2011, Mil Máscaras returned to Japan to celebrate the 40th anniversary of his debut in the country. He teamed with Dos Caras and Original Tiger Mask to defeat CIMA, Último Guerrero and Tiger Mask IV in a six-man tag team match.

In April 2012, Mil Máscaras was inducted into the WWE Hall of Fame by his nephew Alberto Del Rio.

== Personal life ==
Mil Máscaras has never been unmasked in the ring, and like most masked luchadores, he goes to great lengths to conceal his true appearance and personal life. He has two brothers who wrestled, Dos Caras and Sicodélico. He has two sons and two daughters with his first wife, who died in 1975, and two daughters with his second wife, whom he married in 1995. His nephews are Alberto Del Rio (also known as Dos Caras Jr., El Hijo de Dos Caras, and Alberto El Patrón); the current El Hijo de Dos Caras; Sicodélico Jr.; and Hijo Del Sicodelico.

Mil Máscaras is an avid golfer and plays in many charity golf tournaments around the world, including the annual Los Angeles Police Memorial Foundation Celebrity Golf Tournament.

Along with pro wrestling, Mil Máscaras is a fan of Japanese martial arts, and has practised judo, aikido, jujutsu, karate and kendo, among others. He trained jujutsu under a Mitsuyo Maeda student, and also trained under Professor Tanaka. Mil Máscaras started learning martial arts as a counter to shoot attempts, and recalls several wrestlers who tried to shoot on him and whom he had to legitimately submit.

== Championships and accomplishments ==
- Alianza Latinoamericana de Lucha Libre
  - ALLL World Heavyweight Championship (1 time)
- All Japan Pro Wrestling
  - PWF United States Heavyweight Championship (1 time)
  - January 2 Korakuen Hall Heavyweight Battle Royal (1983)
- Cauliflower Alley Club
  - Other inductee (2006)
- Commission de Box y Lucha Libre Mexico D.F.
  - Mexican National Light Heavyweight Championship (2 times)
- Consejo Mundial de Lucha Libre
  - Homenaje a Dos Leyendas honoree (2018)
- International Professional Wrestling Hall of Fame
  - Class of 2021
- International Wrestling Association
  - IWA World Heavyweight Championship (1 time)^{1}
- National Wrestling Alliance
  - NWA Hall of Fame (Class of 2009)
- NWA Big Time Wrestling – World Class Wrestling Association
  - NWA American Tag Team Championship (1 time) – with Jose Lothario
  - NWA Texas Tag Team Championship (1 time) – with Jose Lothario
  - WCWA World Tag Team Championship (1 time) – with Jeff Jarrett
- NWA Hollywood Wrestling
  - NWA Americas Heavyweight Championship (3 times)
  - NWA Americas Tag Team Championship (3 times) – with Alfonso Dantés (2) and Ray Mendoza (1)
  - NWA Americas Six-Man Tag Team Championship (2 times) – with Médico #1 & Médico #2 (1) and Médico #1 & Pepe López (1)
- Professional Wrestling Hall of Fame and Museum
  - (Class of 2010)
- Pro Wrestling Illustrated
  - PWI Most Popular Wrestler of the Year (1975)
  - PWI ranked him # 94 of the 500 best singles wrestlers during the "PWI Years" in 2003.
  - PWI ranked him # 128 of the 500 best singles wrestlers of the PWI 500 in 1993.
- Tokyo Gurentai
  - Tokyo World Tag Team Championship (1 time, current) – with Dos Caras
- Tokyo Sports
  - Match of the Year Award (1977) vs. Jumbo Tsuruta on August 25
- World Wrestling Association
  - WWA World Heavyweight Championship (2 times)
- WWE
  - WWE Hall of Fame (Class of 2012)
- Wrestling Observer Newsletter
  - Wrestling Observer Newsletter Hall of Fame (Class of 1996)

^{1}Ernie Ladd claims to have defeated Mil Máscaras for the title on April 1, 1977, but Mascaras retained the physical belt following IWA's closure and continued to periodically defend it as his own personal championship. His last recorded title defense was in 2016 against Nosawa Rongai.

=== Luchas de Apuestas record ===
Winner (wager)	Loser (wager)	Location	Event	Date	Notes
Mil Máscaras (mask)	Benny Galant (hair)	Mexico City	Live event	April 22, 1966	
Mil Máscaras (mask)	Black Gordman (hair)	Los Ángeles, California	Live event	September 19, 1969	
Mil Máscaras (mask)	Bull Ramos (hair)	Los Ángeles, California	Live event	October 10, 1969	
Mil Máscaras (mask)	Barón Escarlata (mask)	N/A	Live event	January 2, 1971	
Mil Máscaras (mask)	Frankenstein (mask)	Tijuana, Baja California	Live event	1974	(Note: This was a triangle match that also included Texas.)
Mil Máscaras (mask)	Alfonso Dantés (hair)	Mexico City	Live event	February 22, 1977	(Note: This was a triangle match that also included El Halcon)
Mil Máscaras (mask)	El Halcón (mask)	Mexico City	Live event	July 29, 1977	
Mil Máscaras (mask)	El Halcón (mask)	Japan	Live event	September 13, 1978	
Mil Máscaras (mask)	Popitekus (hair)	Tijuana, Baja California	Live event	August 1988	
Mil Máscaras (mask)	Principe Battu (hair)	Dallas, Texas	Live event	November 20, 1994	
Mil Máscaras (mask)	Gran Markus Jr. (mask)	Naucalpan, State of Mexico	Live event	June 29, 1997	(Note: This was a triangle match that also included Tinieblas)
Mil Máscaras (mask)	Venom (mask)	Reynosa	Live event	March 17, 2007	
Mil Máscaras (mask)	El Yuma (mask)	Reynosa	Live event	March 20, 2007	

== Filmography ==
Film roles
Year	Title	Role	Notes
1966	Mil Máscaras ("Thousand Masks")		First appearance and origin of Mil Máscaras; the only B&W film in the series.
1966	Los Canallas ("The Scoundrels")		AKA The Swine, Hell's Angels, or Angeles Infernales; made in color
1968	Las Vampiras ("The Vampire Girls")		Co-starring John Carradine
1968	Enigma de Muerte ("Enigma of Death")		Co-starring John Carradine
1970	Los Campeones Justicieros ("The Champions of Justice")		Co-starring Blue Demon, Tinieblas, El Médico Asesino, and La Sombra Vengadora
1970	Las Momias de Guanajuato ("The Mummies of Guanajuato")		Co-starring Santo and Blue Demon
1972	El Robo de las Momias de Guanajuato ("The Theft of the Mummies of Guanajuato")		Co-starring The Blue Angel and El Rayo De Jalisco
1972	Vuelven los Campeones Justicieros ("The Champions of Justice Return")		Co-starring Blue Demon, El Fantasma Blanco, El Rayo de Jalisco, and El Avispón Escarlata
1972	Una Rosa Sobre el Ring ("A Rose in the Ring")		Co-starring Crox Alvarado as "The Black Mask"
1973	Leyendas Macabras de la Colonia ("Macabre Legends of the Colony")		Co-starring Tinieblas and El Fantasma Blanco
1973	Las Momias de San Ángel ("The Mummies of San Ángel")		Co-starring Tinieblas and El Fantasma Blanco
1973	Los Vampiros de Coyoacán ("The Vampires of Coyoacán")		Co-starring Superzan
1973	El Poder Negro ("The Black Power")		Co-starring Sergio Oliva
1977	Misterio en las Bermudas ("Mystery in Bermuda")		Co-starring Santo and Blue Demon
1983	El Hijo del Santo en la Frontera Sin Ley ("Son of Santo in the Lawless Frontier")		
1988	La Verdad de la Lucha ("The Truth About Wrestling")		
1990	La Llave Mortal ("The Deadly Key")		
2007	Mil Mascaras vs. the Aztec Mummy	Himself	AKA Mil Mascaras: Resurrection
2008	Academy of Doom	Himself	
2015	Aztec Revenge	Himself	
