= Vaughn Johnson =

New Zealand cricketer (born 1960)

Personal information
- Full name: Vaughn Francis Johnson
- Born: 2 September 1960 (age 66); Dunedin, Otago, New Zealand
- Batting: Right-handed
- Bowling: Right-arm medium

Domestic team information
- Years: Team
- 1984/85–1990/91: Otago
- Source: ESPNcricinfo, 15 May 2016

Vaughn Fancis Johnson (born 2 September 1960) is a New Zealand former cricketer. He played 27 first-class and 20 List A matches for Otago between the 1984–85 and 1990–91 seasons.

Johnson was born at Dunedin in 1960. After his playing career was over he became a selector for the Wellington cricket team.
