= Aztec Revenge =

2015 film

- Theatrical release poster
- Directed by: Aaron Crozier
- Written by: Jeffrey Uhlmann
- Produced by: Kathy Murray, Jeffrey Uhlmann
- Starring: Mil Máscaras, Kurt Mirtsching, Kirsten Olson, Jeffrey Uhlmann
- Cinematography: Ben Burke
- Edited by: Chris Tobin
- Music by: Anna Cazurra
- Distributed by: Tritium Productions
- Release date: February 1, 2015
- Running time: 85 minutes
- Country: United States
- Language: English

Aztec Revenge (also known as Mil Mascaras: Aztec Revenge) is a 2015 American lucha libre film starring the legendary Mexican masked wrestler and film star Mil Máscaras. It continues a storyline from the popular 2008 film, Mil Mascaras vs. the Aztec Mummy, and is the third of a trilogy of films that also includes Academy of Doom.

== Plot ==
The Professor discovers that thieves have absconded with priceless Aztec artifacts that were shipped to Columbia State University for study after the defeat of a resurrected Aztec mummy several years earlier by Mil Mascaras. The Professor reports the theft to Mil, who immediately flies to the campus. After Mil Mascaras is attacked by teams of ninjas and sorority sisters, he concludes that one of the artifacts, the Jewel of Tonauac, is being used by someone - or something - for mind control. Mil and the Professor visit a fraternity that they suspect may be involved and discover that the head of an Aztec chief has been resurrected and has plans for world domination. Mil is captured and restrained so that his (Mil's) head can be removed and replaced with that of the Aztec chief. With help from the Professor, Mil escapes and destroys the head.

== Reception ==
In 2015 the film had its world premiere in Madrid, Spain and screened in November of that year as an official selection at the St. Louis International Film Festival. Based on the popularity of the film at those two events, as well as the popularity of its two predecessors, it was selected to screen as part of a 2017 special event at the Fantasia International Film Festival at which Mil Mascaras received a lifetime achievement award.
