= WSL Fighting World Championship =

Professional wrestling promotion

Details
- Promotion: Wrestling Superstars Live
- Date established: June 13, 2007
- Date retired: February 21, 2009

Other names
- Zero-One United States Heavyweight Championship; AWA Superstars of Wrestling United States Championship
Statistics
- First champion: Ricky Landell
- Final champion: Keith Walker

The WSL Fighting World Championship, also known as the WSL World Fighting Championship, was a secondary championship in the Wrestling Superstars Live (WSL) promotion. It replaced the AWA Superstars of Wrestling United States Championship as the organization's secondary singles title on March 29, 2008.

== Title history ==
Key
| No. | Overall reign number |
| Reign | Reign number for the specific champion |
| Days | Number of days held |
| + | Current reign is changing daily |

| No. | Champion | Championship change | | | Reign statistics | | Notes | Ref. |
| No. | Champion | Date | Event | Location | Reign | Days | Notes | Ref. |
|---|---|---|---|---|---|---|---|---|
Zero-One United States Heavyweight Championship / AWA Superstars of Wrestling United States Championship
| 1 | Ricky Landell | June 13, 2007 | N/A | Indianapolis, Indiana | 1 | 290 | Defeated Zach Gowen to win the Zero-One United States Heavyweight title. Landell was named the AWA Superstars of Wrestling United States champion due to this victory, and later vacated the Zero-One title when Zero1-Max left AWA Superstars of Wrestling in December 2007. | |
WSL World Fighting Championship
| — | Vacated | March 29, 2008 | — | — | — | — | The championship is replaced by the WSL World Fighting Championship. | |
| 2 | Ricky Landell | March 29, 2008 | House show | Racine, Wisconsin | 2 | 168 | Defeated Keith Walker to become the first WSL World Fighting Champion. | |
| 3 | Keith Walker | September 13, 2008 | House show | Waukesha, Wisconsin | 1 | 161 | | |
| — | Deactivated | February 21, 2009 | — | — | — | — | The championship is retired when WSL goes out of business. | |

== See also ==
- AWA Superstars of Wrestling United States Championship
- Zero-One United States Heavyweight Championship
