= Kirby Mack =

American professional wrestler

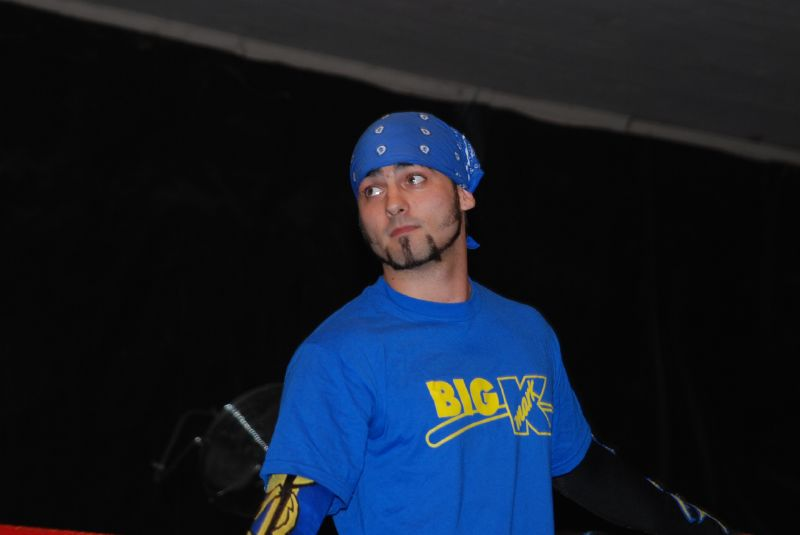
- Mack in NWA Anarchy

Personal information
- Born: November 25, 1983 (age 42) Philadelphia, Pennsylvania
- Website: Krazy-K.com

Professional wrestling career
- Ring name(s): Arthur Rosenburg; Kirby Mack; Krazy K
- Billed height: 5 ft 11 in (1.80 m)
- Billed weight: 188 lb (85 kg)
- Billed from: Philadelphia, Pennsylvania; Neverland; Spartanburg, South Carolina
- Trained by: Hardy Boyz; Shannon Moore; C. W. Anderson; Jeff Hammrick
- Debut: May 23, 2000

Kirby Mack (born November 25, 1983) is a retired American professional wrestler, known for his appearances on the independent circuit. He also wrestled for mainstream promotions such as World Wrestling Entertainment, Ring of Honor and Total Nonstop Action Wrestling.

== Professional wrestling career ==
=== Ring of Honor (2003–2005) ===
After being trained by the Hardy Boyz as well as wrestling for their promotion, the Organization of Modern Extreme Grappling Arts, Mack made his Ring of Honor debut on July 19, 2003, in a three-way match against Jeff Hardy and Joey Matthews, which Hardy ultimately won. Mack, along with Matthews, would later become a member of the heel stable Special K. While a part of the group, Mack would compete in several scramble matches as Special K feuded with the likes of The S.A.T., The Backseat Boyz and The Carnage Crew until the stable started to break apart and ultimately disbanded on March 12, 2005. Mack left ROH soon after.

=== Independent circuit (2005–present) ===
After leaving ROH, Mack has begun wrestling for various independent promotions, including Ring of Honor's sister promotion Full Impact Pro, Combat Zone Wrestling, and most notably AWA Superstars of Wrestling. While with the AWA, Mack became the inaugural World Light Heavyweight Champion on July 30, 2005, after defeating Shannon Moore in a tournament final. Mack held the title for a little over a year before losing it to Xsiris on September 8, 2006. Mack claimed to still be the champion despite losing the title. On December 2, 2006, Mack's brother T.J. defeated both him and then-reigning champion Xsiris in a ladder match to become the undisputed and official champion. During T.J.'s reign as Light Heavyweight Champion, he and Kirby would team up as "Team MackTion" and would claim the World Tag Team Championship on June 14, 2006. However, they lost the title later that day to Steve Corino and Ricky Landell. After the title loss, Kirby would eventually defeat T.J. for his second Light Heavyweight Championship reign on January 7, 2007.

=== World Wrestling Entertainment ===
Mack appeared on the December 3, 2007 episode of WWE Heat, teaming with Brodie Chase in a losing effort against Paul London and Brian Kendrick.

Mack also appeared on the June 4, 2012 edition of WWE Raw. He teamed with Stoney Hooker and cut a promo as heels that they would end Ryback's undefeated streak. They lost to Ryback in a handicap match.

== Championships and accomplishments ==
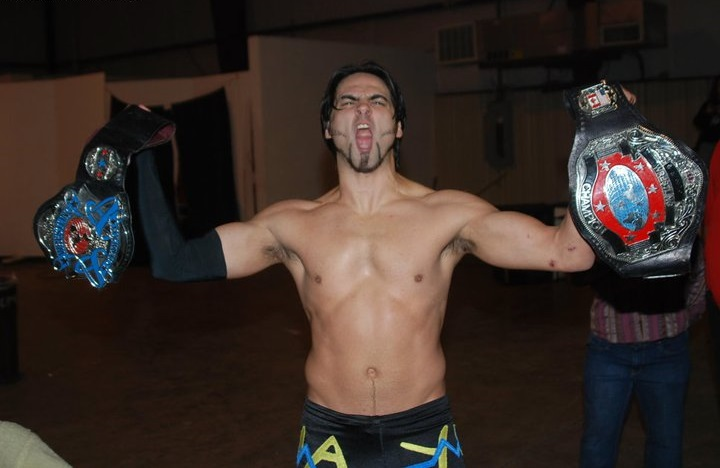
Mack in December 2010

- AWA Superstars of Wrestling / Wrestling Superstars Live
  - AWA Superstars/WSL World Light Heavyweight Championship (2 times)
  - AWA Superstars World Tag Team Championship (1 time) – with T.J. Mack
  - AWA World Light Heavyweight Title Tournament (2005)
- Carolina Wrestling Association/Pro Wrestling Showcase
  - CWA Tag Team Championship (2 times) – with T.J. Mack
  - King of the Ring Tournament (2008)
- Coastal Championship Wrestling
  - CCW Cruiserweight Championship (1 time)
- CWF Mid-Atlantic
  - CWF Mid-Atlantic Rising Generation League Championship (1 time)
- Maryland Championship Wrestling
  - MCW Tag Team Championship (1 time) – with T.J. Mack
- NWA Anarchy
  - NWA Anarchy Television Championship (1 time)
- Pro Wrestling Illustrated
  - PWI ranked him #351 of the top 500 singles wrestlers in the PWI 500 in 2011
- Southern Championship Wrestling
  - SCW Junior Heavyweight Championship (1 time)
  - SCW Light Heavyweight Championship (1 time)
- Pro Wrestling EVO
  - Super HEX Championship (1 time, inaugural)
  - Super HEX Championship Tournament (2012)
- USA Xtreme Wrestling
  - UXW Xtreme Championship (1 time)
- Other titles
  - ICW Cruiserweight Championship (1 time)
  - SCW Extreme Championship (1 time)
