= Ricky Landell =

American former professional wrestler (born 1982)

Personal information
- Born: April 25, 1982 (age 44) St. Paul, Minnesota, U.S.

Professional wrestling career
- Ring name: Ricky Landell
- Billed height: 6 ft 1 in (185 cm)
- Billed weight: 212 lb (96 kg)
- Billed from: St. Paul, Minnesota
- Trained by: Steve Corino; Tatsuhito Takaiwa
- Debut: November 1, 2003
- Retired: 2009

Ricky Landell (born April 25, 1982) is an American former professional wrestler. He is best known for competing in various independent promotions, the most notable being Ring of Honor, Pro Wrestling ZERO1-MAX / Pro Wrestling Zero1 and AWA Superstars of Wrestling / Wrestling Superstars Live.

== Professional wrestling career ==
=== Debut (2003–2004) ===
After training under Steve Corino, Ricky Landell made his professional wrestling debut on November 1, 2003 where he wrestled fellow debuting wrestler Alex Law to a ten-minute draw. After both debuted, Landell and Law began teaming with each other to compete in several tag team matches for Pro Wrestling WORLD-1 beginning in 2004. Following a six-man tag team where he, Law and their partner Greg Spitz lost to the Extreme Horsemen (C.W. Anderson, Justin Credible and Simon Diamond) on April 10, Landell was inducted into the Horsemen as its newest member.

In mid-2004, Landell, less than a year into his career, made an excursion to Japan to receive further training and briefly trained under Tatsuhito Takaiwa while touring with Shinya Hashimoto's Pro Wrestling ZERO1-MAX. Landell made his debut for the promotion on July 9, where he competed in his first championship match at the legendary Korakuen hall in Tokyo, Japan. He lost to Tommy Wilson in a cage match to determine who would win the vacant BS American Championship. The following day, Landell teamed with Wilson to defeat Fuyuki Takahashi and Shinsuke Z Yamagasa in a tag team cage match.

=== Independent circuit and championship success (2005–2008) ===
Beginning in 2005, Landell made his Ring of Honor debut on January 15 at their event It All Begins, where he and four other men lost to Roderick Strong in a four-on-one handicap match. He returned to the promotion on February 19 at their event Do Or Die IV, where he teamed with his old partner Alex Law to defeat Anthony Franco and Davey Andrews. On March 12, Landell made his third and final ROH appearance as he and Law lost to The Ring Crew Express at the event Back To Basics.

On January 29, 2006, Landell defeated Masato Tanaka to win Pro Wrestling WORLD-1's Heavyweight Championship, giving him the first championship of his career. Upon becoming champion, Landell became the face of promotion and would go on to defend the title in WORLD-1 in various Independent Promotions around the country, including a notable victory over his trainer and mentor Steve Corino on April 9 in Pottstown, PA. Landell would ultimately become the longest reigning champion in the promotion's history, as he held the title for 1279 days with his reign only ending due to his retirement from wrestling in early 2009.

Landell would continue his championship success as he teamed with Corino to win the AWA Superstars of Wrestling World Tag Team Championship on June 14, 2006 after defeating Team MackTion (Kirby Mack and T.J. Mack). Despite holding two titles simultaneously, Landell won a battle royale on July 22 to become the number one contender for the AWA Superstars of Wrestling Heavyweight Championship. Later on that day, he wrestled then-champion Ric Converse for the title in a losing effort. Landell and Corino would later lose the World Tag Team Titles to Converse and Xsiris on March 23, 2007.

Landell soon began competing more frequently for AWA Superstars of Wrestling, becoming a travelling brand talent for the promotion, competing nationally for various AWA territorial promotions as well as the home company. He became the promotion's first United States Champion on June 13, 2007 after defeating Zach Gowen in Rochester, MN. The win also simultaneously made him Pro Wrestling ZERO1-MAX's new United States Heavyweight Champion due to the AWA and ZERO1-MAX splitting from each other. His reign with the AWA's version of the title ended on March 29, 2008 after the title was deactivated and Landell became the first Fighting World Champion of the now-renamed Wrestling Superstars Live following a victory over Keith Walker. On August 13, Landell lost the Fighting World Title to Walker in a rematch.

Aside from WORLD-1 and WSL, Landell returned to the now-renamed Pro Wrestling Zero1 in early May 2008 and defeated Sterling James Keenan on June 1 to win the promotion's United States Heavyweight Title for the second time. He would go on to hold the title for over two months before losing it to King Kaluha on August 22.

After several attempts, Landell finally won the WSL World Heavyweight Championship on October 11 in Indianapolis, IN in front of 3000 fans at the famed Indianapolis Speedrome after defeating "The Living Legend" Larry Zbyszko, whom he had previously lost to in a title match back on May 3 when the championship was under the AWA Superstars banner.

=== Retirement ===
On February 21, 2009, Landell lost the World Heavyweight Title to Keith Walker in a screw job like finish where afterwards WSL Owner Dale Gagne publicly fired Landell. Soon afterwards, Landell's official Myspace profile page and website were taken down and it was later announced that he had retired from wrestling. His retirement resulted in the Pro Wrestling WORLD-1 Heavyweight Championship being vacated and ending his reign at 1,279 days, the longest reign of any kind in the promotion's history.

On June 12, 2011, Landell made what was to be a one-night only return as he wrestled against and lost to Corino at Pro Wrestling WORLD-1's event The Last Stampede. Landell ended up making 2 more appearances for the promotion in 2011 and 2012.

== Championships and accomplishments ==
- AWA Superstars of Wrestling / Wrestling Superstars Live
  - AWA Superstars of Wrestling United States Championship (1 time)
  - AWA Superstars of Wrestling / WSL World Heavyweight Championship (1 time)
  - AWA Superstars of Wrestling / WSL World Tag Team Championship (2 times) – with Steve Corino (1) and Jonnie Stewart (1)
  - WSL Fighting World Championship (1 time)
- Cauliflower Alley Club
  - Future Legend Award (2008)
- Premier Wrestling Federation
  - PWF Tag Team Championship (1 time) – with Kid America
  - PWF Universal Heavyweight Championship (1 time)
- Pro Wrestling Illustrated
  - Ranked No. 275 of the 500 top wrestlers in the PWI 500 in 2009
- Pro Wrestling WORLD-1
  - WORLD-1 Heavyweight Championship (1 time)
- Pro Wrestling ZERO1-MAX / Pro Wrestling Zero1
  - Zero1 United States Heavyweight Championship (2 times)
