= Zero-One United States Heavyweight Championship =

Professional wrestling championship

Details
- Promotion: Pro Wrestling Zero1
- Date established: January 6, 2003
- Date retired: November 15, 2009

Other names
- NWA/Zero-One United States Heavyweight Championship; Zero-One United States Openweight Championship; Zero1-Max United States Openweight Championship
Statistics
- First champion: Steve Corino
- Final champion: Mr. Wrestling 3
- Most reigns: Steve Corino/Mr. Wrestling 3 (4)
- Longest reign: Mr. Wrestling 3 (371 days)
- Shortest reign: Hulk Ogan (<1 day)

The Zero-One United States Heavyweight Championship was a professional wrestling title in Japanese promotion Pro Wrestling Zero1. It was created on January 6, 2003, with Steve Corino defeating Masato Tanaka. In addition to Japan, it has recently been frequently defended in various independent companies in the United States.

The title was created at a time when the company was known as Pro Wrestling Zero-One, originally naming it the Zero-One United States Heavyweight Championship; on July 4, 2004, following Zero-One joining the National Wrestling Alliance (NWA), the title was renamed the NWA/Zero-One United States Heavyweight Championship. On October 26, 2004, Zero-One left the NWA, removing its initials from the title and renaming it the Zero-One United States Openweight Championship. When the promotion's name was changed to Zero1-Max in 2005, the championship title followed. On March 25, 2007, the title again switched its name, this time to the Zero1-Max International Championship; however, on June 13, 2007, the International title was apparently stricken from the record, and was reverted to the US title. On April 12, 2008, it was renamed back to its original title by Steve Corino, in honor of Zero1-Max's late founder Shinya Hashimoto. There have been a total of 11 recognized champions who have had a combined 18 official reigns.

== Title history ==
=== Names ===
Name	Years
NWA/Zero-One United States Heavyweight Championship	July 9, 2004 – October 31, 2004
Zero-One United States Openweight Championship	October 31, 2004 – 2005
Zero1-Max United States Openweight Championship	2005 – April 12, 2008
Zero-One United States Heavyweight Championship	January 6, 2003 - July 4, 2004; April 12, 2008 – January 2009

=== Reigns ===
Key
No.	Overall reign number
Reign	Reign number for the specific champion
Days	Number of days held
<1	Reign lasted less than a day

No.	Champion	Championship change			Reign statistics		Notes	Ref.
No.	Champion	Date	Event	Location	Reign	Days	Notes	Ref.
1	Steve Corino	January 6, 2003	Fighting Illusion – Night 2	Tokyo, Japan	1	179	Defeated Masa Tanaka to win the inaugural championship.	
2	The Predator	July 4, 2003	01 Storm 2003 – Night 6	Niigata, Japan	1	37		
3	Hulk Ogan	August 10, 2003	01 World in Nagoya	Nagoya, Japan	1	<1		
—	Vacated	August 10, 2003	—	—	—	—	Stripped by NWA president Howard Brody due to the match not being officially scheduled.	
4	The Predator	October 13, 2003	N/A	Fukuoka, Japan	2	228	Defeated Mike Knox to win the vacant title.	
5	Kohei Sato	July 9, 2004	Rally of the Cage 2004 – Night 1	Tokyo, Japan	1	125	This was a steel cage match.	
6	Steve Corino	November 11, 2004	Enormous 2004 – Night 1	Tokyo, Japan	2	79		
—	Vacated	January 30, 2005	—	—	—	—	Vacated so Corino could focus on winning the AWA World Heavyweight Championship.	
7	Leonardo Spanky	March 23, 2005	N/A	Hakodate, Japan	1	161	Defeated Ryouji Sai on the Strong Wind & Thunder tour.	
—	Vacated	August 31, 2005	—	—	—	—	Vacated due to Spanky leaving the company.	
8	Alex Shelley	September 19, 2005	You Can Do Your Best! Nachiro Hosikawa Charity Show	Tokyo, Japan	1	65	Defeated Sonjay Dutt to win the vacant title.	
9	Christopher Daniels	November 23, 2005	Max Around 2005 – Night 6	Tokyo, Japan	1	162	This was a three way match also involving Sonjay Dutt.	
—	Vacated	May 4, 2006	—	—	—	—	Vacated due to inactivity.	
10	Ricky Landell	June 13, 2007	N/A	Indianapolis, Indiana	1	205	Defeats Zach Gowen to win the vacant title.	
11	Mr. Wrestling 3	January 4, 2008	N/A	Valdosta, Georgia	3	64	Won the title by forfeit when Landell refused to defend it; Landell continues to be recognized by AWA Superstars of Wrestling until March 29, 2008.	
12	Sterling James Keenan	March 8, 2008	Devil Bhudakahn Memorial Show	Munhall, Pennsylvania	1	7		
13	Dr. X	March 15, 2008	N/A	Morganville, New Jersey	1	28		
14	Jake Manning	April 12, 2008	CWA Final Conflict	York, South Carolina	1	27		
15	Sterling James Keenan	May 9, 2008	3KWrestling New Revolution	Limerick, Pennsylvania	2	23	This match was also for the 1PW World Heavyweight Championship.	
16	Ricky Landell	June 1, 2008	3KWrestling Dojo Challenge 2	Limerick, Pennsylvania	2	82		
17	King Kaluha	August 22, 2008	3KWrestling Summertime Blues	Limerick, Pennsylvania	1	79		
18	Mr. Wrestling 3	November 9, 2008	N/A	Rochester, Minnesota	4	–		
—	Vacated	January 2009	—	—	—	—	The actual retirement date is disputed.	

== See also ==
- AWA Superstars of Wrestling United States Championship
- Wrestling Superstars Live
- Pro Wrestling Zero1
- Zero1 World Heavyweight Championship
- Zero1 International Junior Heavyweight Championship
- NWA United National Heavyweight Championship
- NWA Intercontinental Tag Team Championship
- NWA International Lightweight Tag Team Championship
