= Steve Corino =

Canadian professional wrestler (born 1973)

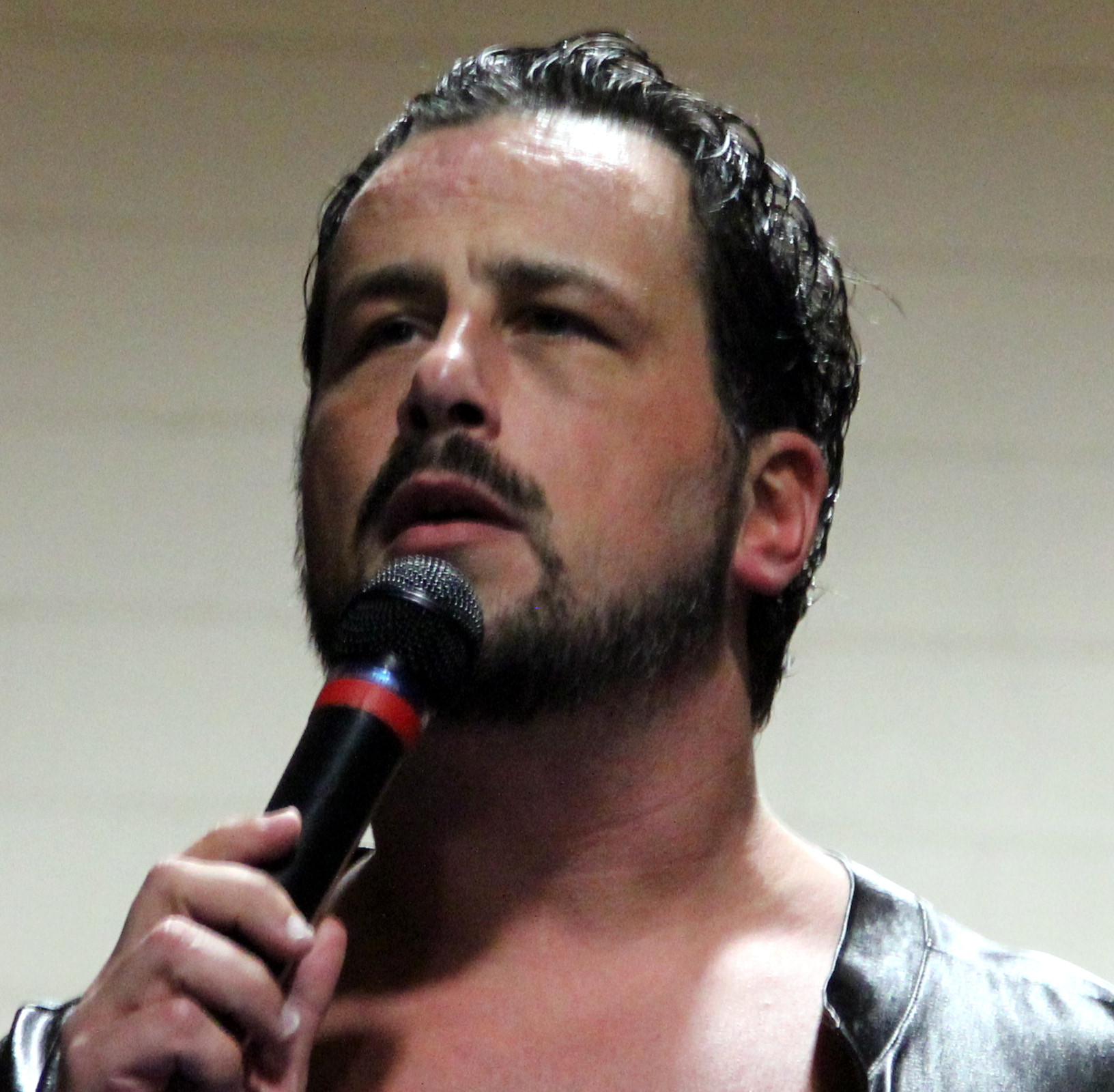
- Corino in 2012

Personal information
- Born: Steven Eugene Corino; May 29, 1973 (age 53) Winnipeg, Manitoba, Canada
- Spouses: Nicole Holmstock (m. 1997; div. 2003) Saana-Maria Huhtimo (m. 2006; div. 2009) Jordan Pennypacker (m. 2013)
- Children: 3
- Family: Allison Danger (sister); Ares (brother in-law); Colby Corino (son)

Professional wrestling career
- Ring name(s): Katakari Max; Kendo Shinkiba; King Corino; Lightning Kid (II); Monster C Mr. Baseball; Mr. Wrestling 3 Steve Christie; Steve Corino; Tom Cosati
- Billed height: 6 ft 3 in (191 cm)
- Billed weight: 242 lb (110 kg)
- Billed from: Sea Isle City, New Jersey
- Trained by: King Kaluha; Mark Mest; Salvatore Sincere
- Debut: April 6, 1994

Steven Eugene Corino (born May 29, 1973) is a Canadian-American professional wrestler and trainer. As of 2017, he works for WWE as both a trainer at the WWE Performance Center and a producer for NXT. He is also signed as a wrestler to Premier Wrestling Federation (PWF) as of 2026, and is the current PWF Champion in his seventh reign.

Corino is best known for his tenure with Extreme Championship Wrestling (ECW) from 1998 to 2001 and Ring of Honor (ROH) from 2002 to 2006 and from 2009 to 2016. Over the course of his career, he held titles including the ECW World Heavyweight Championship, MLW World Heavyweight Championship, NWA World Heavyweight Championship, and ROH World Tag Team Championship. He initially retired in 2021, but returned to competition in 2026 exclusively for PWF.

== Professional wrestling career ==
=== Early career (1994–1998) ===
Corino began wrestling in 1994 and spent four years working on the independent circuit. During this time, he was a part of the Organization of Modern Extreme Grappling Arts, a promotion run by Matt and Jeff Hardy. Corino began an anti-hardcore gimmick on the independent circuit, because he felt he would have more chance of getting work if he did not work hardcore matches. He gained experience, working in Puerto Rico for the WWC, working under the ring name Lightning Kid (which had been a gimmick previously used by Sean Waltman) and also made some appearances for the WWF as a jobber from 1996 to 1998.

=== Extreme Championship Wrestling (1998–2001) ===
In 1998, Corino debuted in Extreme Championship Wrestling as a heel manager. He stood out in ECW as a result of his "King of Old School" gimmick, where he would deride hardcore wrestlers, at one point invading a Limp Bizkit concert and protesting the immoral conduct.

In late 1999, Corino took Jack Victory on as a manager, and became an advisor for Tajiri and Rhino. He then began feuding with Dusty Rhodes, who defeated him in a gory Bullrope match at Living Dangerously. At Heat Wave 2000, he lost to Jerry Lynn. Corino went on to win the ECW World Heavyweight Championship on November 5, 2000, at November to Remember by defeating Justin Credible, Sandman and Champion Jerry Lynn in a Double Jeopardy match; then to successfully defend it in December at Massacre on 34th Street (against Jerry Lynn and Justin Credible in a three way dance) and at Holiday Hell 2000 (against Justin Credible and The Sandman in a three way dance).

Due to repeated failures of ECW paying Corino his salary, he left the company on January 7, 2001, the night he lost the ECW World Heavyweight Championship to The Sandman at Guilty as Charged 2001. His friend Dustin Rhodes got him a contract in World Championship Wrestling, but he never got to make an appearance despite being due to debut at the company's third to last PPV Sin. When World Wrestling Entertainment took over WCW in March 2001, they released Corino from his contract. He went on to wrestle for many of the National Wrestling Alliance regional promotions. On April 24, he won the NWA World's Heavyweight Championship.

=== Independent circuit (2001–2006) ===
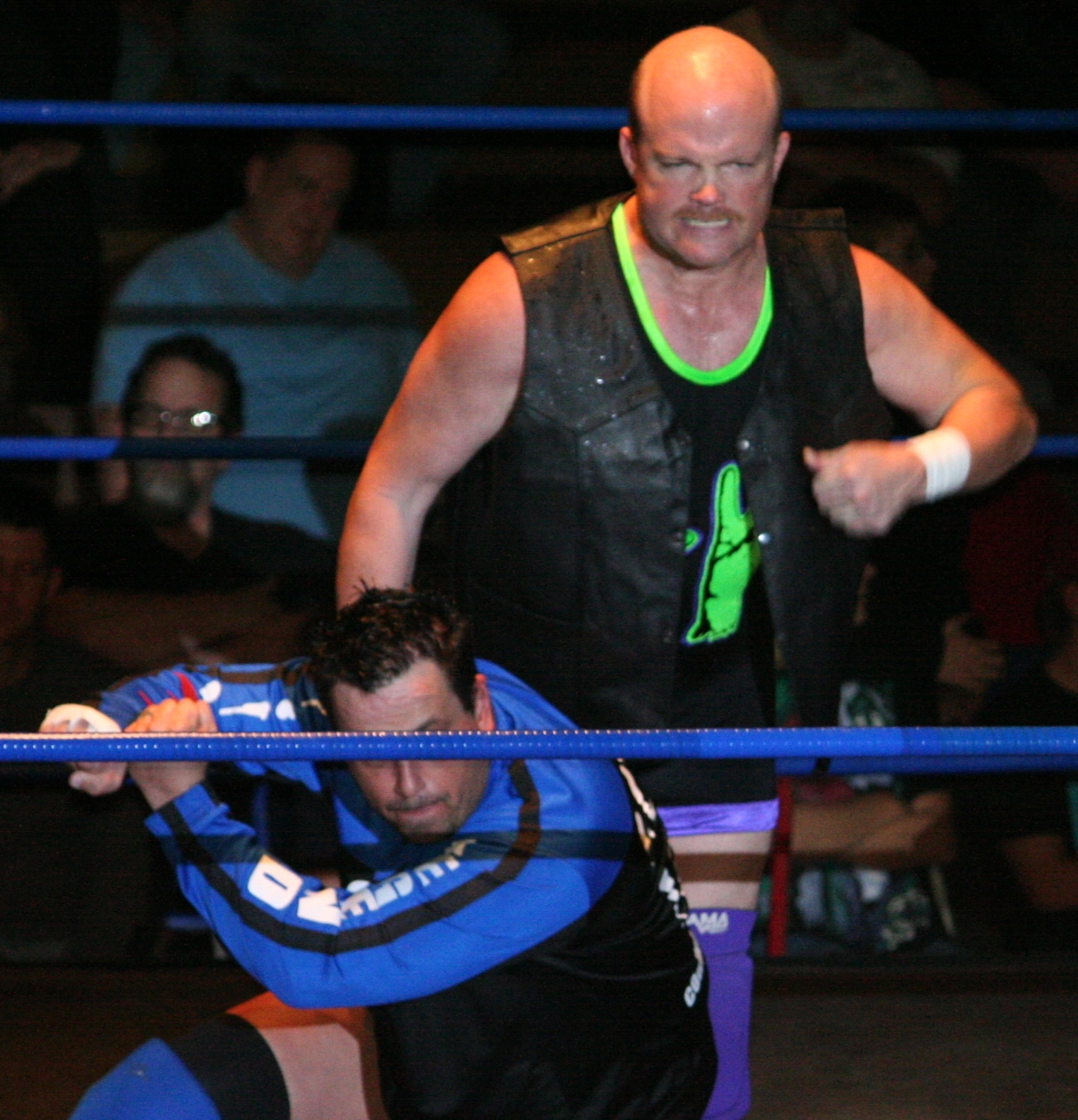
Corino with CW Anderson

Corino continued his feud with Rhodes in his Turnbuckle Championship Wrestling promotion as well as Southern Championship Wrestling and was part of the Extreme Horsemen with C. W. Anderson and Barry Windham. He was also part of the Extreme Horsemen in Major League Wrestling with C. W. Anderson, Justin Credible and Simon Diamond. They were briefly managed by the legendary J. J. Dillon before MLW folded. Also, Corino went on to win the MLW World Heavyweight Championship before the promotion was folded.

In 2004 Corino made a number of appearances for Frontier Wrestling Alliance in the United Kingdom, where he entered a short rivalry with Alex Shane. The feud culminated in the main event match of Hotwired, where Corino defeated Shane with the assistance of then FWA Heavyweight Champion, Doug Williams.

As Steve Corino was a major part of ECW towards the end of its run, rumors swirled surrounding Corino possibly signing with World Wrestling Entertainment and returning to his ECW roots as a part of the new version of ECW, but he squashed those rumors in a posting on his LiveJournal. Corino worked in various independent promotions, including Zero-One, Hustle in Japan, Ring of Honor in the United States and both One Pro Wrestling and Celtic Wrestling in the United Kingdom. He was also president of World-1 Fighting Arts, which runs shows in Michigan, Pennsylvania and Georgia.

=== NWA Total Nonstop Action (2002, 2003) ===
Corino worked for NWA Total Nonstop Action during its early days. Corino had matches with Low Ki and many other stars before leaving the promotion some time later.

=== Ring of Honor (2002–2006) ===
On February 23, 2002, Steve Corino appeared at Ring of Honor's inaugural event, “The Era of Honor Begins”, acting as the color commentator. Corino made his in-ring debut at the first annual Glory by Honor in October, accepting Homicide's open invitation for a tag team partner to answer a challenge from The Backseat Boyz. In the course of the match, Corino turned on Homicide after Homicide accidentally hit him, Old School Kicking his partner and leaving the ring, enabling the Backseat Boyz to easily defeat Homicide.

Homicide and Corino would then begin a four-year rivalry, with Corino criticizing Homicide's lifestyle and somewhat checkered past. The feud culminated in a match at the One Year Anniversary Show on February 8, 2003, in Queens, New York, New York. Homicide was the hometown favorite, but lost to Corino following interference from The Group (Samoa Joe, Michael Shane, C. W. Anderson and Simply Luscious), Corino's entourage. After the match, Corino applied a cobra clutch to Homicide, while the rest of The Group mocked New York City, instigating a worked riot.

Corino and Homicide had a rematch August 16, 2003, at Bitter Friends, Stiffer Enemies which saw Corino defeated. After twenty minutes of fighting which saw both men bleeding and carrying injuries, Homicide trapped Corino in a modified STF, prompting Corino's corner man, Guillotine LeGrande, to throw in the towel, awarding the match to Homicide. In the course of the match, Corino suffered a legitimate ruptured eardrum, and permanently lost most of the hearing in his left ear following a stiff slap to the side of the head from Homicide. Homicide has since stated in a shoot interview that he is not sorry for costing Corino his hearing, claiming Corino had been stiff with him the whole match.

Homicide faced Corino for a third time on November 29, 2003, at War of the Wire in a barbed wire match. This time however, Julius Smokes threw in the towel for Homicide after Corino throttled him with a length of barbed wire. Corino offered Homicide a handshake after the match, indicating that he finally respected Homicide, but Homicide refused to shake his hand. On October 14, 2005, at Enter the Dragon, Corino returned to ROH in a tag team match that saw him team with Colt Cabana to defeat Low Ki and Homicide.

On December 3 in New York City at Steel Cage Warfare, Homicide lost to Corino in a rematch from their feud of 2003 after Colt Cabana, under a mask, interfered in the match. During the match, Homicide separated his shoulder, but opted not to have surgery. As a result of his injury, Homicide was unable to compete at the following show, Final Battle 2005. He did show up, however, but with the intent on killing Steve Corino. Following Corino's match, Homicide ran down to the ring and attacked him. Colt Cabana ran down to the ring to save Corino, only to have Homicide pour Drano down his throat.

He returned to ROH in August 2006 after a long absence, reigniting his feud with Homicide. The feud culminated on November 4 in Philadelphia, at The Bitter End when Homicide beat Corino in a Fight Without Honor. Although the two still hated each other, they shook hands after the match and Corino allowed Homicide to shave his head.

=== Retirement tour (2007) ===
After announcing that he would retire at the end of 2007, Corino began a retirement tour and travelled to various federations as a part of the tour. On October 6, 2007, Corino won the B4W North American Championship in Morganville, New Jersey, United States from Tommy Thunda.

On November 3, 2007, Corino won an eight-man tournament in Toronto, Ontario, Canada to become the Union of Independent Professional Wrestlers Heavyweight Champion. He defeated Eddie Osbourne in the first round by pinfall, Pepper Parks in the second round by referee stoppage and John McChesney in the finals. On November 10, 2007, Corino successfully defended the B4W North American Championship against Jihad. On November 24 he beat Absolute Andy for the GSW Heavyweight Championship in Oberhausen, Germany.

On December 8, 2007, Corino made his final Northeast appearance for B4W. He lost the North American Championship to Jihad in a submission match after his protege Ricky Landell threw in the towel. Corino won the Platinum Pro Wrestling Heavyweight Championship on December 14, 2007, after defeating Erico in Michigan City, Indiana, United States.

Corino's retirement tour came to an end December 28, 2007, when he wrestled his final match for the Showcase Wrestling Revolution in Montreal, Quebec, Canada. On that night he faced Jeremy Barnoff, Brick Crawford, and Kevin Steen for the SWR International Championship in a fatal four way elimination match.

Corino wrestled a few try-out matches for WWE over a span of two days. Dusty Rhodes, Corino's former rival, was hopeful that WWE would sign him, but he was not offered a contract. Corino stated on MySpace that while he enjoyed his time with WWE, he felt he was too "old school" for the company.

=== Return to the independent circuit (2008–2016) ===
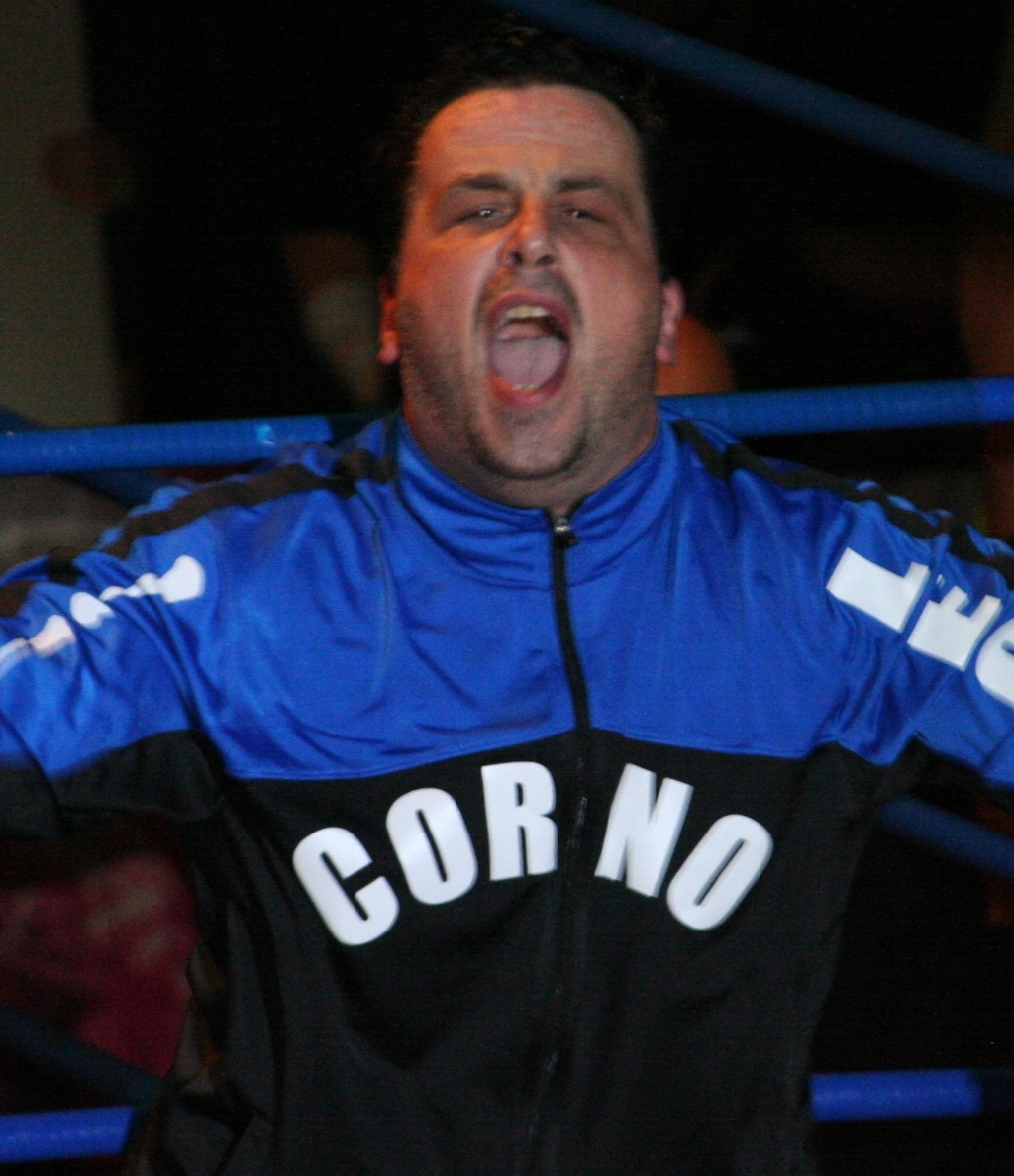
Corino in January 2012

On the January 4, 2008, Corino won his third Zero1-Max United States Openweight Championship as Mr. Wrestling 3 (named after Mr. Wrestling I and II) by beating Ricky Landell in Valdosta, Georgia. He then lost the U.S. Title to SJK on March 8, 2008, at the Devil Bhudakahn Memorial Show in Munhall, Pennsylvania. He began wrestling as "Mr. Wrestling 3" Steve Corino without the mask, and sometimes as just "Mr. Wrestling 3" with the mask.

On July 24, 2008, Corino announced he would begin wrestling full-time again in his online blog. Corino plans to return to Japan where he has been the most successful.

On July 19, 2008, Corino participated in the event WWC Anniversary but only to lose to Eugene. Later on September 20, 2008, he participated in the event Septiembre Negro where he defeated Sabu. Recently he is one of the members of a group called "La Familia", and is in a feud with BJ for the WWC Puerto Rico Heavyweight Championship. In this feud thanks to the beatings that lead disqualification by the members of "La Familia", Ray Gonzalez saved BJ and after that Steve Corino attacked Ray Gonzalez in the locker rooms and this began a feud for the WWC Universal Heavyweight Championship. On February 7, Steve Corino beat Ray Gonzalez to become WWC Universal Heavyweight Champion. On July 11 at Aniversario 2009 he lost the title to BJ.

On June 26, 2010, Corino was inducted into the Legends Pro Wrestling "Hall of Fame" by Jack Blaze in Wheeling, West Virginia at their annual "LPW Rumble in the Valley" event.

Since August 2010, Corino has made appearances in Germany for German Stampede Wrestling.

On April 23, 2011, Corino returned to WWC and defeated Carlito, Gilbert and Shane the Glamour Boy in a gauntlet match to win the vacant WWC Universal Heavyweight Championship for the second time. He would lose the title to Carlito on June 4, 2011.

On January 28, 2012, Steve Corino, billed as the "King of Old School", defeated Vordell Walker with assistance by Jillian Hall and the "Tokyo Monster" Kahagas in Orlando, Florida to become the PWX (Pro Wrestling Extreme) Heavyweight Champion. Corino, although bloodied, successfully defended his title against Tommy "Wildfire" Rich on April 28, 2012, in Orlando, Florida.

On December 28, 2012, Steve Corino made his appearance for an ECW "revival" company as he appeared for Extreme Rising as the "mystery challenger" for Stevie Richards' Extreme Rising World Championship, where he was defeated by submission.

In September 2014, Steve Corino defeated Doug Williams for the WAW World Heavyweight Championship in England which he would then defend in the USA in 2014 and 2015 against Curt Robinson and Joe Black.

On May 9, 2015, Steve Corino made an appearance at TWE in Red Bank, Chattanooga against Ray Fury, where he was defeated.

On May 22, 2015, Steve Corino became the PWF World-1 Heavyweight Champion defeating Jagger, Emmanuel Ortega and former teammate CW Anderson in a Fatal Four-Way.

On March 6, 2016, Corino, along with CW Anderson, returned to Zero1 to take part in the promotion's 15th anniversary event.

=== Return to Ring of Honor (2009–2016) ===
==== Feud with Kevin Steen (2009–2011) ====
On the December 7, 2009 edition of Ring of Honor Wrestling on HDNet, a video was shown hyping Corino's return to the company. During early-2010, Corino formed a partnership with Kevin Steen and together the two of them started a feud with Steen's former tag team partner El Generico and Colt Cabana. On April 3, 2010, Corino made his ROH pay-per-view debut at ROH The Big Bang!, where he and Steen were defeated by El Generico and Cabana via disqualification, when Steen used a chair on his former partner. On September 11 at Glory By Honor IX Generico and Cabana defeated Steen and Corino in a chain match, when Cabana forced Corino to tap out. On October 16, 2010, Cabana defeated Corino in an "I Quit" match to end their feud. Following Steen's departure from Ring of Honor after December's Final Battle 2010, Corino proclaimed himself a changed man and turned babyface. Corino began feuding with Mike Bennett, and the two faced each other at Manhattan Mayhem IV on March 19, with Bennett picking up the victory. On May 21 at Supercard of Honor VI, Corino revealed the returning Jimmy Jacobs as the sponsor, who had helped him change his ways. Kevin Steen returned to ROH on June 26 at Best in the World 2011, seemingly wanting redemption as well. However, after saving Corino from the House of Truth, Steen turned on him and Jacobs, before being dragged out of the arena. On December 23 at Final Battle 2011, with Jimmy Jacobs as the special guest referee and Jim Cornette at ringside, Kevin Steen defeated his former mentor, Corino, in a No Disqualification match to be reinstated in ROH.

==== S.C.U.M. (2012–2013) ====
Corino returned to ROH on May 12, 2012, when he formed the S.C.U.M. (Suffering, Chaos, Ugliness, and Mayhem) stable with Steen and Jacobs. On September 15 at Death Before Dishonor X: State of Emergency, Corino and Jacobs defeated Charlie Haas and Rhett Titus in the finals of a tournament to win the vacant ROH World Tag Team Championship. They lost the title to the Briscoe Brothers (Jay and Mark) on December 16 at Final Battle 2012: Doomsday in a three-way match, which also included the team of Caprice Coleman and Cedric Alexander. On April 6, 2013, Corino became the new leader of S.C.U.M., when the stable turned on Kevin Steen, after he had lost the ROH World Championship. On June 23, S.C.U.M. was forced to disband, after being defeated by Team ROH in a Steel Cage Warfare match.

==== Color commentator; retirement (2013–2016) ====
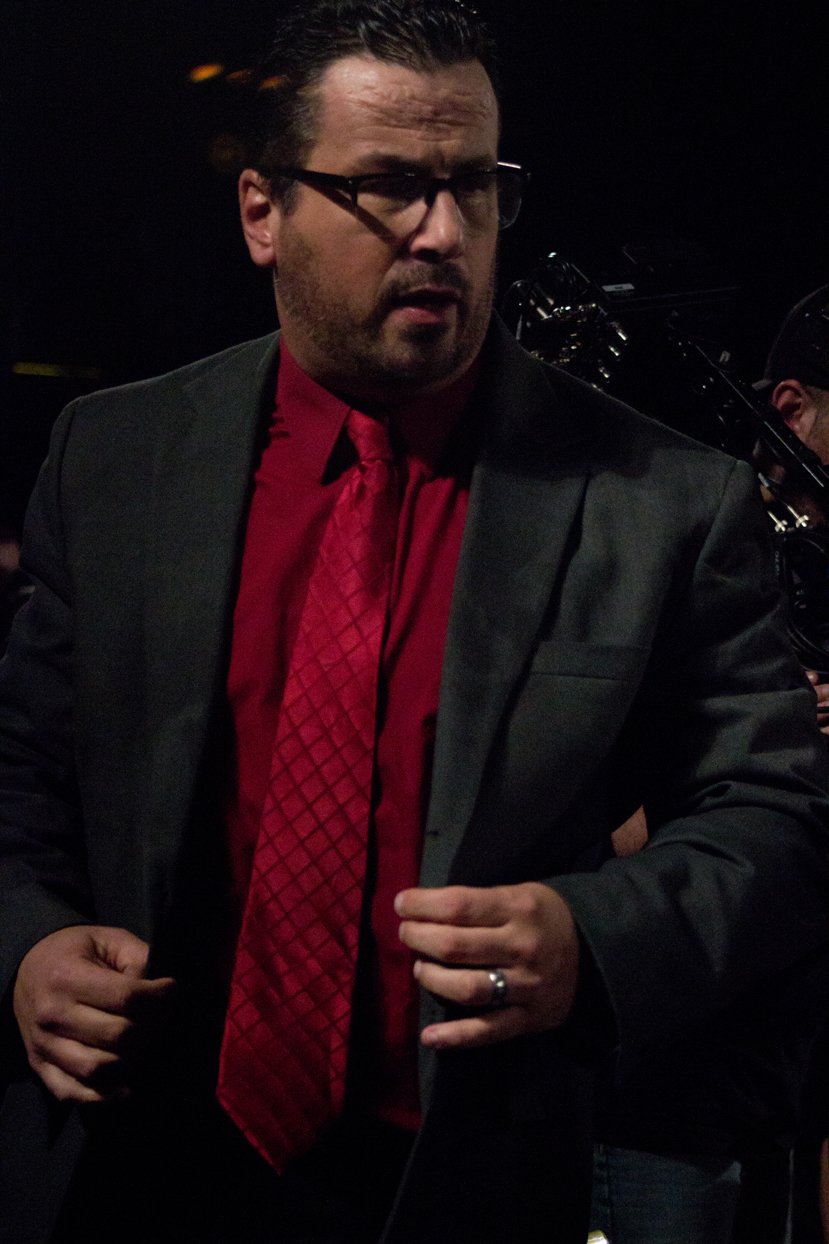
Corino in April 2013

Following the dissolution of S.C.U.M., Corino began serving as ROH's regular color commentator alongside play-by-play commentator Kevin Kelly and occasionally Nigel McGuinness.

While serving as commentator, Corino had a running feud with B. J. Whitmer and The Decade. The rivalry saw Whitmer goading "Corino" to join The Decade, with Corino refusing. Whitmer eventually revealed that he was not talking about Steve Corino but rather his son, Colby Corino, who he successfully recruiting him into The Decade. During his feud, McGuinness warned Corino that he could not attack any ROH employee or he would be suspended. After Corino attacked Whitmer with a roll of quarters, McGuinness suspended and banned him from commentary. Corino was ultimately reinstated as a wrestler and was scheduled to fight Whitmer in a Fight without Honor at Final Battle. However, Corino announced that he was scheduled to have neck surgery and that his career might end. He continued to serve as a color commentator under a mask as "Mr. Wrestling 3". During this time, Whitmer insisted that Mr. Wrestling 3 was indeed Steve Corino; he began convincing Colby that Corino had replaced him with his new wife and son. At War of the Worlds, Corino returned as Steve Corino, stating that he did not want to be the "evil man" anymore, but that after Whitmer's deeds, he would do things that he will never apologize for. At Best in the World '16 in June 2016, Corino faced Whitmer in a Fight Without Honor, but lost after the interference of Kevin Sullivan.

After losing to Whitmer, Corino returned to commentating, but during Whitmer's matches, he was continuously berated by Sullivan. At the Final Battle event, Cody, who defeated Jay Lethal, proceeded to cause chaos in the ring and then he pushed Corino. The night at the event, Whitmer said that a "brother" has to be sacrificed, which was revealed that Corino was about to fight Cody, who berated Corino's actions with Dusty Rhodes. In their match, Corino lost to Cody, which was Corino's last match in ROH. Corino's ROH contract expired on December 31, 2016.

=== WWE (2016–present) ===
In November 2016, Corino worked as a guest trainer at the WWE Performance Center. Shortly afterwards, it was reported that he had signed to become a full-time trainer for WWE, starting January 2017. On January 12, 2017, it was confirmed that Corino was now working for WWE. According to Pro Wrestling Torch in September 2017, Corino teaches the advanced class at the WWE Performance Center, the third of four levels of classes. In November 2018, it was revealed that Corino was also working as a producer for WWE.

On August 27, 2021, Corino broke his retirement for a single night, appearing at the Premier Wrestling Federation's "Colby Corino's 25th Anniversary Show", where he unsuccessfully challenged his son Colby for the PWF Crystal Coast Oceanic Championship.

== Personal life ==
Corino is the older brother of retired independent wrestler Allison Danger, and has a half-brother whose first name is also Steven.

Corino married Nicole Holmstock on June 14, 1997. Together they have a son, Colby (born August 28, 1996), who is a professional wrestler. Corino and Nicole divorced in 2003. On November 12, 2005, Steve Corino got engaged to his Finnish girlfriend Saana-Maria Huhtimo. They were married on May 12, 2006, in North Carolina. However, the couple separated in mid-2008, divorcing the following year. Corino married Jordan Pennypacker in 2013, and had their first child together, a son named Beckham, or "Becks" for short.

Corino has repeatedly stated that his favorite old school wrestlers are Tommy Rich and Tully Blanchard. Corino has said that his favorite match while in ECW was the infamous Texas Bullrope Match against Dusty Rhodes at Living Dangerously 2000.

Corino hosts the Extreme Odd Couple podcast with Rob Dimension, where they talk about professional wrestling and their personal lives.

== Championships and accomplishments ==
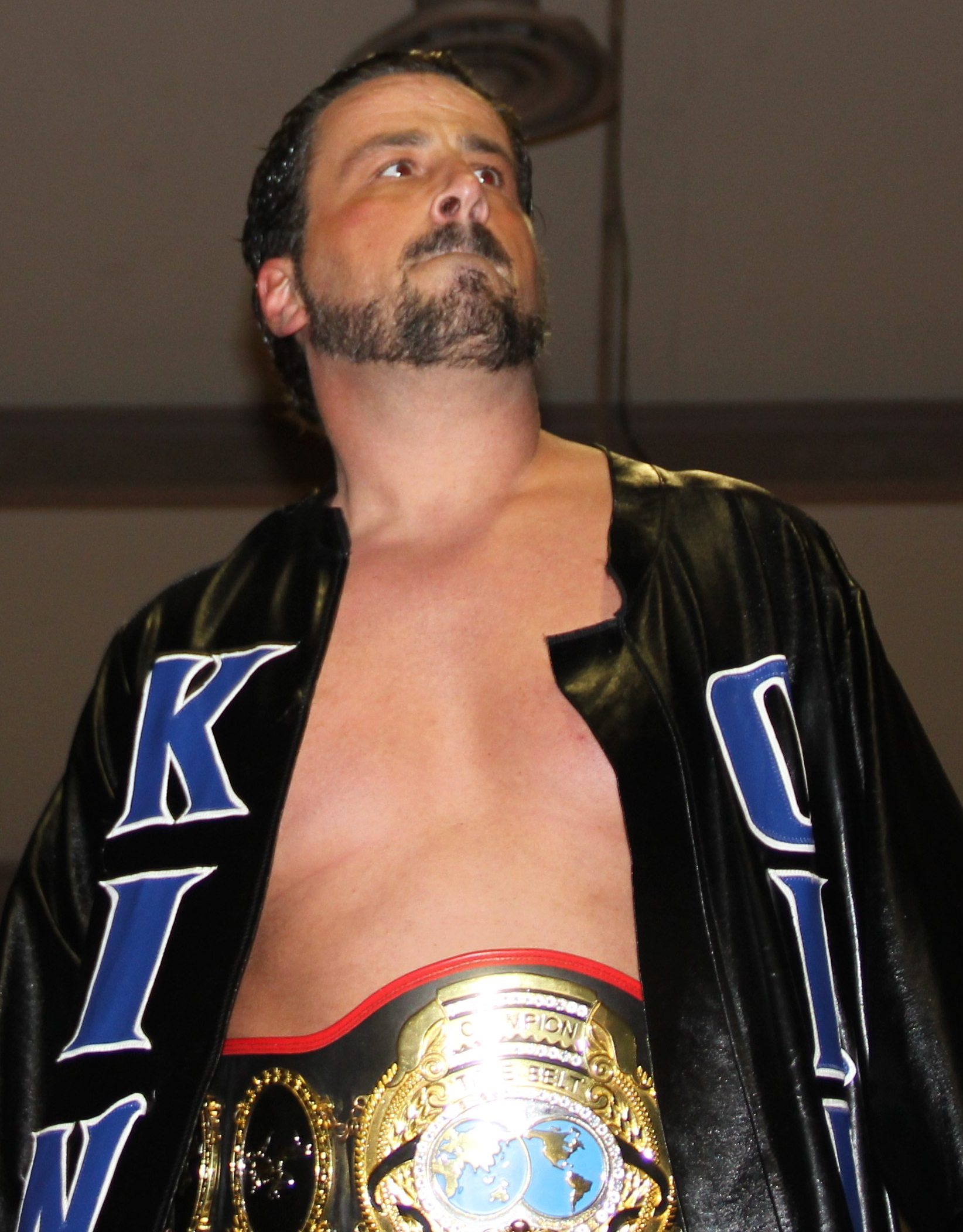
Corino as the PWF Northeast Heavyweight Champion in 2012.

- Absolute Intense Wrestling
  - AIW Absolute Championship (1 time)
- ACE Pro Wrestling
  - ACE Heavyweight Championship (1 time)
- All Action Wrestling
  - AAW Australian Championship (1 time)
- American Wrestling Council
  - AWC Heavyweight Championship (1 time, final)
- AWA Superstars of Wrestling
  - AWA Superstars of Wrestling World Heavyweight Championship (2 times)
  - AWA Superstars of Wrestling World Tag Team Championship (1 time) – with Ricky Landell
- Appalachia Pro Wrestling
  - APW Heavyweight Championship (1 time)
- Blue Water Championship Wrestling
  - BWCW Heavyweight Championship (1 time)
- Brew City Wrestling
  - BCW Heavyweight Championship (1 time)
- American Championship Entertainment
  - ACE Heavyweight Championship (1 time)
- Brookwood 4 Wrestling
  - B4W North American Heavyweight Championship (2 times)
  - B4W Hardcore Championship (1 time)
  - B4W Heavyweight Championship (1 time)
  - Shocker of the Year Award (2007)
- Carolina Wrestling Association
  - CWA Heavyweight Championship (1 time)
- East Coast Wrestling Association
  - ECWA Tag Team Championship (2 times) – with Lance Diamond
  - ECWA Hall of Fame (class of 2021)
- Eastern Shores Wrestling
  - ESW Light Heavyweight Championship (1 time)
- Extreme Championship Wrestling
  - ECW World Heavyweight Championship (1 time)
- Funking Conservatory
  - FC !BANG! Television Championship (1 time)
  - FC Tag Team Championship (1 time) – with Adam Windsor
- German Stampede Wrestling
  - GSW World Heavyweight Championship (3 times)
  - Four Nations Cup (2005)
- Hawai'i Championship Wrestling
  - HCW Kekaulike Heritage Tag Team Championship (1 time) – with Mr. Wrestling II
- High Volume Pro Wrestling
  - HVPW Hall of Fame (2016)
- High Risk Pro Wrestling
  - HRPW World Heavyweight Championship (1 time)
- IWA Championship Wrestling
  - IWA Heavyweight Championship (1 time)
- Independent Wrestling Federation
  - IWF American Championship (2 times)
- Independent Pro Wrestling Alliance
  - IPWA Light Heavyweight Championship (1 time)
  - IPWA Tag Team Championship (1 time) – with Adam Flash
  - IPWA Light Heavyweight Title Tournament (1997)
- Intercontinental Wrestling Association
  - IWA-PA Heavyweight Championship (1 time)
- International High Powered Wrestling
  - IHPW Heavyweight Championship (1 time)
- KYDA Pro Wrestling
  - KYDA Pro Heavyweight Championship (1 time)
  - KYDA Pro Mid-Atlantic Championship (1 time)
- Legends Pro Wrestling
  - LPW Hall of Fame (Class of 2010)
- Major League Wrestling
  - MLW World Heavyweight Championship (1 time)
- Maryland Championship Wrestling
  - MCW Hall of Fame (Class of 2010)
- Mid-Eastern Wrestling Federation
  - MEWF Mid-Atlantic Championship (1 time)
  - MEWF Light Heavyweight Championship (3 times)
  - MEWF Tag Team Championship (3 times) – with Jimmy Cicero
  - Most Hated Wrestler Achievement Award (1996)
- National Wrestling Alliance
  - NWA World Heavyweight Championship (1 time)
- NWA 2000
  - NWA American Heritage Championship (1 time)
  - NWA 2000 Light Heavyweight Championship (1 time)
  - NWA American Heritage Title Tournament (1997)
- NWA Florida
  - NWA Florida Heavyweight Championship (1 time)
  - NWA Southern Heavyweight Championship (Florida version) (1 time)
  - NWA Heartland States Heavyweight Championship (1 time)
  - NWA Florida Southern Heavyweight Title Tournament (2002)
- NWA New Jersey
  - NWA New Jersey / New York Heavyweight Championship (1 time)
  - NWA United States Tag Team Championship (New Jersey version) (1 time) – with Lance Diamond
  - NWA World Light Heavyweight Championship (New Jersey version) (1 time)
- NWA (Midwest)
  - NWA Midwest Heavyweight Championship / Zero1 Pro Wrestling USA Midwest Heavyweight Championship (1 time)
- NWA (Southwest)
  - NWA North American Heavyweight Championship (1 time)
- One Pro Wrestling
  - 1PW World Heavyweight Championship (1 time)
- Organization of Modern Extreme Grappling Arts
  - OMEGA Heavyweight Championship (1 time)
- Pennsylvania Championship Wrestling
  - PCW Junior Heavyweight Championship (1 time)
- Pennsylvania Wrestling Alliance
  - PWA Heavyweight Championship (1 time)
- Platinum Pro Wrestling
  - PPW Heavyweight Championship (1 time)
- Premier Championship Wrestling
  - PCW Heavyweight Championship (1 time)
  - PCW Tag Team Championship (1 time) – with Adam Knight
- Premier Wrestling Federation
  - PWF Tag Team Championship (4 times) – with C. W. Anderson (3) and Kid America (1)
  - PWF Universal Six Man Tag Team Championship (1 time) – with C. W. Anderson and John Skyler
  - PWF Universal Heavyweight Championship (7 times, current)
  - PWF Mid-Atlantic Masters Championship (1 time)
  - PWF Universal Six Man Title Tournament (2016) – with C. W. Anderson and John Skyler
  - Match of the Year (2002, 2005, 2014, 2021)
  - PWF MVP (2003)
  - Tag Team of the Year (2005) - with C. W. Anderson
  - Premier Tag League X (2026) - with Alexander Lev
- Pro-Wrestling SUN
  - WBD Tag Team Championship (1 time) - with Toshie Uematsu
- PWF Northeast
  - PWF Northeast Heavyweight Championship (1 time)
- Pro Wrestling Extreme
  - PWX Heavyweight Championship (1 time)
- Pro Wrestling Illustrated
  - PWI ranked him #35 of the top 500 singles wrestlers in the PWI 500 in 2001
  - PWI Most Improved Wrestler of the Year (2000)
- Pro Wrestling World-1
  - AWA World Heavyweight Championship (2 times)
  - PWF World-1 Heavyweight Championship (2 times)
  - World-1 North American Championship (1 time)
  - World-1 Tag Team Championship (2 times) – with C. W. Anderson (1) and Colby Corino (1)
- Pro Wrestling Zero1
  - AWA World Heavyweight Championship (2 times)
  - NWA Intercontinental Tag Team Championship (4 times) – with Mike Rapada (1), C. W. Anderson (1), Y2P-160kg (1), and Charles Evans (1)
  - Zero-One United States Heavyweight Championship (4 times)
- Pure Wrestling Association
  - PWA Pure Wrestling Championship (1 time)
  - Carrot Cup (2008) - with Reggie Marley
- United States Wrestling Federation
  - USWF Tag Team Championship (1 time) – with Salvatore Sincere
- Ring of Honor
  - ROH World Tag Team Championship (1 time) – with Jimmy Jacobs
  - ROH World Tag Team Championship Tournament (2012) – with Jimmy Jacobs
- Southern Championship Wrestling
  - SCW Junior Heavyweight Championship (1 time)
- Tri-State Wrestling Alliance
  - TSWA Heavyweight Championship (1 time)
- Union of Independent Professional Wrestlers
  - UIPW Union Heavyweight Championship (1 time)
  - UNION Heavyweight Title Tournament (2007)
- United States Championship Wrestling
  - USCW Tag Team Championship (1 time) – with Adam Flash
- USA Xtreme Wrestling
  - UXW Heavyweight Championship (2 times)
- World Association of Wrestling
  - WAW World Heavyweight Championship (1 time)
- World Wrestling Council
  - WWC World Junior Heavyweight Championship (1 time)
  - WWC Universal Heavyweight Championship (2 times)
