= Keith Walker (wrestler) =

American professional wrestler (born 1978)

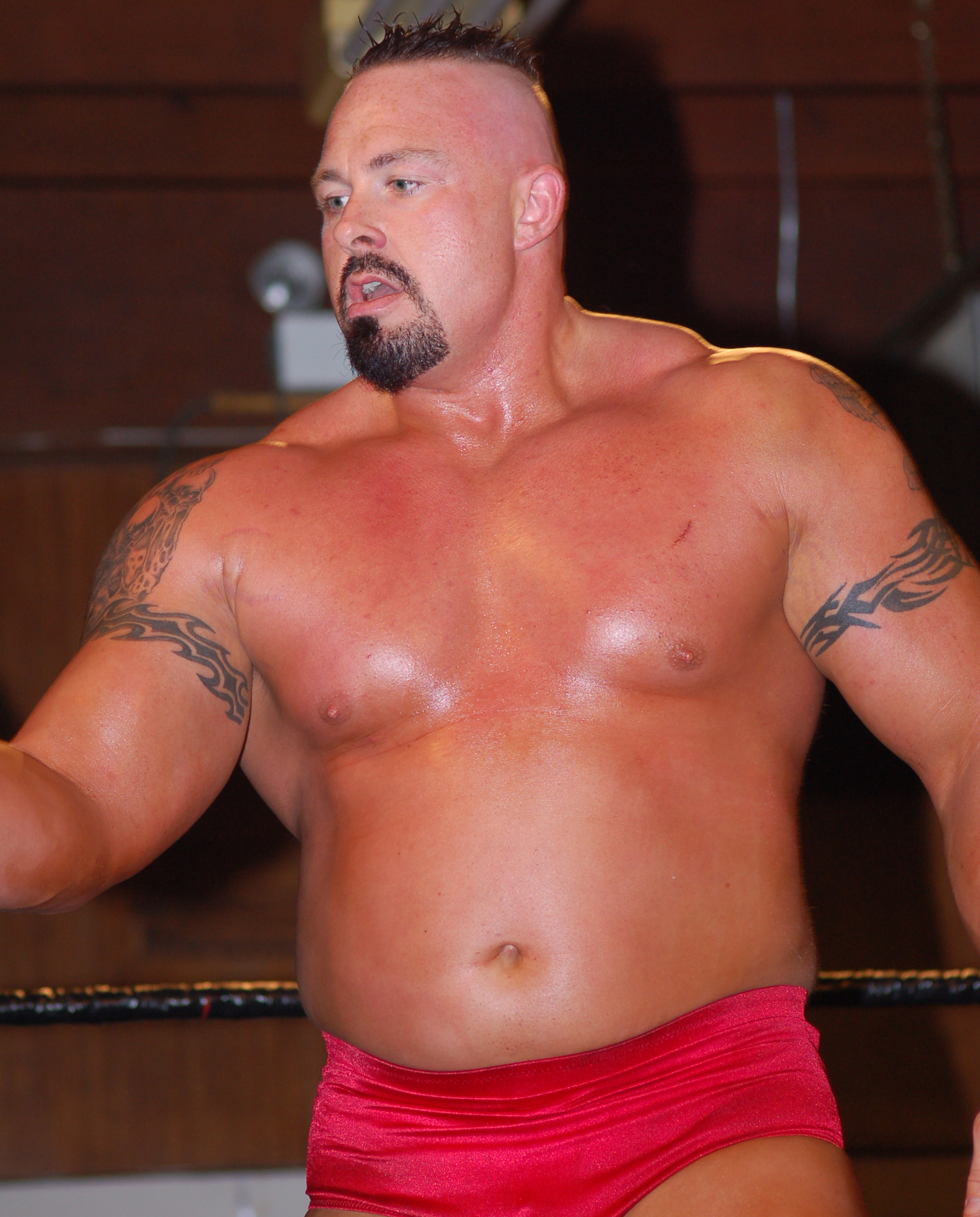
- Walker in November 2007

Personal information
- Born: May 15, 1978 (age 48) Chicago, Illinois, United States

Professional wrestling career
- Ring name(s): Keith Walker; Keith Samson; Mike Venom
- Billed height: 6 ft 2 in (1.88 m)
- Billed weight: 280 lb (130 kg)
- Billed from: Chicago, Illinois
- Trained by: Eric Priest
- Debut: 2003

Keith Walker (born May 15, 1978) is an American professional wrestler who competes in North American and international promotions including Ring of Honor, Harley Race's World League Wrestling and Pro Wrestling Noah.

In November 2006, he signed a World Wrestling Entertainment developmental contract and assigned to Deep South Wrestling and Florida Championship Wrestling before being released from his contract the next year. Since then, he and Rasche Brown have been competing as the SkullKrushers, and currently hold the record for the longest reign as NWA World Tag Team Champions.

== Professional wrestling career ==
=== Early life and career (2003–2005) ===
Born and raised in Chicago, Walker was a wrestling fan as a child and whose favorite wrestlers included Hulk Hogan, Ric Flair and The Road Warriors (Hawk and Animal). He also often went to events at the Rosemont Horizon. Attending North Park University, Walker graduated with a Bachelor of Science and a degree in exercise physiology as well as having an athletic career competing in college football, baseball and wrestling. He also competed in amateur bodybuilding during college, winning second place in the 2002 and 2003 Mr. Illinois competition.

In 2003, he began training to become a professional wrestler. His trainer Eric Priest was himself trained by independent wrestlers Danny Dominion and Ace Steel. Prior to his debut, he had a brief stint with the National Indoor Football League playing for the Myrtle Beach Stingrays. Following his debut, Walker wrestled throughout the United States both under his real name and as Mike Venom, winning numerous championship titles on the independent circuit as well as facing his boyhood idols The Road Warriors in several tag team matches.

=== World League Wrestling (2005–2006) ===
Walker joined World League Wrestling soon after his debut and took part in the Harley Race–Pro Wrestling Noah training camp during 2005 and 2006. On September 24, 2005, Walker scored one of his first major victories defeating Kenny Omega, later aired by Pro Wrestling Noah on Japanese television, and feuded with WLW Heavyweight Champion "Wild" Wade Chism. At the end of the year, he lost to Chism in a three-way mach with Brutus "The Barber" Beefcake on December 10, 2005. The following month, the title was held up, in part to interference by the villainous referee Trevor Murdoch, during a match between the two in Eldon, Missouri on January 28, 2006. On February 24, Walker lost a 3-way dance when Jason Bates was pinned by Chism in St. Joseph. The next night however, Walker was pinned by Bates in a second 3-way dance with Chism to win the title.

Walker also toured Japan with Pro Wrestling Noah in April. A month later, with manager Johnny Gold, he defeated Wade Chism for the WLW Heavyweight Championship in St. Joseph on May 13 although he lost it to Chism two days later. In mid-June, he teamed with Shane Hagadorn against The Irish Airborne (Jake and David Crist) and defeated Bobby Dempsey and C.J. Otis in a three-way match in back-to-back appearances for Ring of Honor.

On November 2, Walker was signed to a developmental contract with World Wrestling Entertainment and left the promotion. He did, however, continue to make appearances with other independent promotions during the next week. On November 4, he lost to Tyler Black at a show for AAW in Berwyn, Illinois and, less than a week later, he and Egotistico Fantastico defeated Matt Longtime and Mickey McCoy at a Brew City Wrestling card.

=== World Wrestling Entertainment ===
==== Deep South Wrestling (2006–2007) ====
A month after signing with WWE, Walker was assigned to its developmental territory Deep South Wrestling. On December 21, he made his debut losing to Jake Hager in a dark match. Early the next year, he wrestled as Keith Samson Walker against Kofi Nahaje Kingston and, the next week, under the name Keith Samson when he defeated Robert Anthony in a dark match on January 11, 2007. He would alternately use both names during his time with DSW and teamed with Johnny Curtis losing to The Major Brothers and Henry Godwinn and Ray Gordy. On March 1, he defeated Ray Gordy and, with Frankie Coverdale, lost a tag team match to Robert Anthony and Johnny Curtis later that night in what turned out to be his last appearance with the promotion.

==== Florida Championship Wrestling (2007) ====
Two months later, he was assigned to another WWE developmental territory, Florida Championship Wrestling, making his debut in a tag team match with Rycklon Stephens to defeat Eric Perez and Kofi Nahaje Kingston on June 26, 2007. They also defeated Team Elite (Mike Knox and Derrick Neikirk) that same week.

On August 4, he and Heath Miller lost to Jake Hager and Ted DiBiase, Jr. The next month, he defeated Hager and Neikirk in a three-way match on September 2. On September 15, he and Shawn Osborne lost to Egotistico Fantastico and Johnny Curtis. After another defeat by Ted DiBiase, Jr. on October 2, Walker was released from his WWE contract due to a "lack of progress".

=== Return to WLW (2007) ===
On October 27, Walker made his return to World League Wrestling defeating Derek McQuinn for the WLW Heavyweight title in Waterloo, Iowa. On November 9, Walker also defeated Dinn T. More for the AWA-Brew City Wrestling Heavyweight Championship. The next night at the NWA Pro Wrestling Summit in Hammond, Indiana, Walker lost to Misterioso. On November 24, he lost to AAW Heavyweight Champion Jerry Lynn at an All American Wrestling event. He also teamed with Dan Lawrence to defeat Derek St. Holmes, Kris Hybrid and Bonebreaker Brooks on December 15, 2007.

=== National Wrestling Alliance and AWA Superstars of Wrestling / Wrestling Superstars Live (2008–2010) ===
At an event for Brew City Wrestling, he and Skullkrusher fought to a double-countout on January 12, 2008. He lost the WLW Heavyweight title a little over three months later to "The Masterpiece" Chris Masters on February 9 in Fordland, Missouri. On March 29, Walker lost to reigning AWA Superstars of Wrestling United States Championship Ricky Landell in an "MMA vs. Wrestling" match to crown the first WSL Fighting World Champion. Following this match, the United States title was abandoned. He later teamed up with Rasche Brown, formerly known as Skullkrusher, to form the Skullkrushers. On October 4, the Skullkrushers defeated Los Luchas to win the NWA World Tag Team Championship. Walker again defeated Landell on February 21, 2009, in Michigan City, Indiana to win the Wrestling Superstars Live World Heavyweight Championship. On November 20, 2010, Walker and Brown lost the NWA World Tag Team Championship to The Dark City Fight Club (Kory Chavis and Jon Davis), ending their reign at 778 days.

=== Pro Wrestling Noah (2010) ===
On April 14, 2010, the team of Keith Walker and Bison Smith defeated Takeshi Rikio and Muhammad Yone to become the GHC Tag Team Champions in Osaka. On August 31, however, Walker's father died. He later chose not to immediately return to Japan, and on September 10 he and Bison Smith were stripped of the GHC Tag Team Championship.

== Championships and accomplishments ==
- All American Wrestling

- AAW Heavyweight Championship (1 time)

- Brew City Wrestling

- BCW Heavyweight Championship (1 time)
- BCW Tag Team Championship (1 time) - with Rasche Brown

- Mid American Wrestling

- MAW Heavyweight Championship (2 times)

- Midwwestern States Pro Wrestling

- MSPW Heavyweight Championship (1 time)

- National Wrestling Alliance

- NWA World Tag Team Championship (1 time) – with Rasche Brown

- Pro Wrestling Epic
  - PWE Championship (1 time)
- Pro Wrestling Illustrated
  - PWI ranked him #241 of the top 500 singles wrestlers in the PWI 500 in 2011
- Pro Wrestling Noah
  - GHC Tag Team Championship (1 time) – with Bison Smith
- World League Wrestling

- WLW Heavyweight Championship (2 times)

- Wrestling Superstars Live

- WSL Fighting World Championship (1 time)
- WSL World Heavyweight Championship (1 time, final)

- World Wrestling Zone
  - WWZ Tag Team Championship (1 time) - with Buddha
