= AWA Superstars of Wrestling United States Championship =

The AWA Superstars United States Championship was a secondary championship in the AWA Superstars of Wrestling promotion, later known as Wrestling Superstars Live.

The AWA Superstars United States Championship split off from the Zero-One United States Heavyweight Championship after Pro Wrestling Zero1-Max left AWA Superstars of Wrestling in December 2007. AWA Superstars of Wrestling recognized the Zero-One champion Ricky Landell as the inaugural AWA Superstars of Wrestling United States champion.

On March 29, 2008, reigning champion Ricky Landell defeated Keith Walker for the WSL World Fighting Championship, after which the AWA Superstars of Wrestling United States title was retired.

Wrestler:	Times:	Date:	Location:	Notes:
Ricky Landell	1	June 13, 2007	Indianapolis, Indiana	Defeated Zach Gowen to win the Zero-One United States Heavyweight title in this match. Landell was later named the AWA Superstars of Wrestling United States champion and vacated the Zero-One title, when Zero1-Max left AWA Superstars of Wrestling in December 2007.
Title abandoned on March 29, 2008 in favor of the WSL World Fighting Championship.

== See also ==
- AWA United States Heavyweight Championship, original version.
- Zero-One United States Heavyweight Championship
- WSL World Fighting Championship
