= WSL World Heavyweight Championship =

Professional wrestling championship

Details
- Promotion: Wrestling Superstars Live
- Date established: June 6, 1996
- Date retired: February 21, 2009

Other names
- AWA World Heavyweight Championship; AWA Superstars of Wrestling World Heavyweight Championship
Statistics
- First champion: Jonnie Stewart
- Final champion: Keith Walker
- Most reigns: Takao Omori (3)
- Longest reign: Jonnie Stewart (1,028 days)
- Shortest reign: Danny Dominion (<1 day)

The WSL World Heavyweight Championship was a professional wrestling world championship in the Wrestling Superstars Live promotion. It was originally known as the AWA Superstars of Wrestling World Heavyweight Championship.

== History ==
In 1996, Dale Gagner and his associate Jonnie Stewart, former American Wrestling Association (AWA) employees, filed corporate papers to license the AWA name in the state of Minnesota and formed an organization known as AWA Superstars of Wrestling. On June 6 of that year, Gagner and Stewart created their version of the AWA World Heavyweight Championship, recognizing all previous AWA world champions.

In April 2007 World Wrestling Entertainment (WWE) filed a lawsuit against Dale Gagner and Jonnie Stewart, citing trademark infringement, as WWE owned all "American Wrestling Association" properties due to their purchase of the company after the original AWA's closure. In October 2008, a court ruled against Gagner and Stewart and ruled in favor of WWE. The court ruling prohibited Gagner and his associates from exploiting or trading on the AWA name or any other derivatives. As a result, the organization was renamed to Wrestling Superstars Live (WSL). Due to there no longer being connections to the original AWA, WSL began only recognizing championship reigns from 1996 and forward.

== Title history ==
Key
No.	Overall reign number
Reign	Reign number for the specific champion
Days	Number of days held
+	Current reign is changing daily

No.	Champion	Championship change			Reign statistics		Notes	Ref.
No.	Champion	Date	Event	Location	Reign	Days	Notes	Ref.
AWA Superstars of Wrestling (AWA)
1	Jonnie Stewart	June 6, 1996	House show	Rochester, Minnesota	1	1,028	Defeated Larry Gligorovich to win the inaugural AWA Superstars of Wrestling World Heavyweight Championship.	
2	King Kong Bundy	March 31, 1999	House show	Oshkosh, Wisconsin	1	486		
—	Vacated	July 29, 2000	House show	—	—	—		
3	Dale Gagne	July 29, 2000	House show	Pine Bluff, Arkansas	1	0	Gagne, owner of AWA Superstars of Wrestling, stripped Bundy of the title and declared himself the new champion.	
4	The Patriot	July 29, 2000	House show	Pine Bluff, Arkansas	1	0		
5	Larry Gligorovich	July 29, 2000	House show	Pine Bluff, Arkansas	1	309		
6	Eric Priest	June 3, 2001	House show	Hillside, Illinois	1	292		
7	Evan Karagias	March 22, 2002	House show	Casa Grande, Arizona	1	41		
8	Danny Dominion	May 2, 2002	House show	Cottonwood, Arizona	2	2	Previously won the championship as The Patriot.	
9	Evan Karagias	May 4, 2002	House show	Casa Grande, Arizona	2	161		
10	Horshu	October 12, 2002	House show	Mercedes, Texas	1	267	Stripped of the title due to missing mandatory title defenses.	
—	Vacated	July 6, 2003	—	—	—	—		
11	Evan Karagias	July 6, 2003	House show	Lemoore, California	3	567	Defeated Eric Priest to win the vacant title. Karagias was fired in January 2005 by Dale Gagne for misconduct and refusing to defend the title as scheduled.	
—	Vacated	January 23, 2005	—	—	—	—		
AWA Superstars of Wrestling (AWA) / Pro Wrestling Zero1-Max (Zero1-Max)
12	Takao Omori	January 23, 2005	Zero1-Max Ground Max	Tokyo, Japan	1	139	Defeated Steve Corino in the finals of a tournament to win the vacant championship.	
13	Steve Corino	June 11, 2005	House show	Bay City, Michigan	1	225		
14	Shinjiro Otani	January 22, 2006	Zero1-Max Faithfully	Tokyo, Japan	1	69		
15	Takao Omori	April 1, 2006	Zero1-Max Yasukuni Shrine Festival	Tokyo, Japan	2	64		
16	Ric Converse	June 4, 2006	House show	Indianapolis, Indiana	1	217		
17	Steve Corino	January 7, 2007	House show	Pottstown, Pennsylvania	2	83	On March 23, 2007, Corino lost the title to TNT at an AWF event in Sydney, Australia; however, on March 28, the AWA Superstars of Wrestling Board of Directors returned the title to Corino when the proper paperwork authorizing the title match could not be found.	
18	Takao Omori	March 31, 2007	Zero1-Max Max Satisfaction	Yokohama, Japan	3	209		
19	Masato Tanaka	October 26, 2007	Zero1-Max Innovation	Tokyo, Japan	1	50		
—	Vacated	December 15, 2007	—	—	—	—	The championship is vacated after Zero1-Max ended its business relationship with AWA Superstars of Wrestling on December 15, 2007. Zero1-Max, however, continued to recognize Tanaka's reign as the first reign of the Zero1-Max World Heavyweight Championship.	
AWA Superstars of Wrestling (AWA)
20	Larry Zbyszko	February 5, 2008	—	Minneapolis, Minnesota	1	249	Awarded the title for being the final holder of the original AWA World Heavyweight Championship.	
†	Brian Logan	April 20, 2008	House show	Fayetteville, West Virginia	1	0	Logan defeated Zbyszko and Ricky Landell in a triple threat match. Shortly thereafter, Mountaineer Wrestling Association of West Virginia, the promotion for which Logan primarily performed, pulled out of AWA Superstars of Wrestling to form the American Wrestling Affiliates with several other promotions. The title was returned to Zbyszko, and Logan's reign was never officially recognized by AWA Superstars of Wrestling. Logan is recognized as the inaugural American Wrestling Affiliates World Heavyweight champion due to this victory.	
Wrestling Superstars Live (WSL)
†	Larry Zbyszko	April 20, 2008	—	—	2	174	Title returned to Zbyszko; AWA Superstars of Wrestling considered this a continuation of Zbyszko's previous reign.	
21	Ricky Landell	October 11, 2008	House show	Indianapolis, Indiana	1	133	Title becomes known as the WSL World Heavyweight Championship when the promotion is forced to rename to Wrestling Superstars Live (WSL).	
22	Keith Walker	February 21, 2009	House show	Michigan City, Indiana	1	0		
—	Deactivated	February 21, 2009	—	—	—	—	The championship is retired when WSL goes out of business.	

=== Combined reigns ===
Rank	Wrestler	No. of reigns	Combined days
1	Jonnie Stewart	1	1,028
2	Evan Karagias	3	775
3	King Kong Bundy	1	486
4	Takao Omori	3	412
5	Larry Gligorovich	1	309
6	Steve Corino	2	308
7	Eric Priest	1	292
8	Horshu	1	267
9	Larry Zbyszko	1^{(2)}	249
10	Ric Converse	1	217
11	Ricky Landell	1	133
12	Shinjiro Otani	1	69
13	Masato Tanaka	1	50
14	The Patriot/Danny Dominion	2	2
15	Dale Gagne	1	0
15	Keith Walker	1	0
—	Brian Logan	1	0

== American Wrestling Affiliates version ==
Key
No.	Overall reign number
Reign	Reign number for the specific champion
Days	Number of days held
+	Current reign is changing daily

No.	Champion	Championship change			Reign statistics		Notes	Ref.
No.	Champion	Date	Event	Location	Reign	Days	Notes	Ref.
American Wrestling Affiliates (AWA)
1	Brian Logan	April 20, 2008	House show	Fayetteville, West Virginia	1	195	Logan defeated Zbyszko and Ricky Landell in a triple threat match to win the AWA Superstars of Wrestling World title. Shortly thereafter, Mountaineer Wrestling Association of West Virginia, the promotion for which Logan primarily performs, pulled out of AWA Superstars of Wrestling to form American Wrestling Affiliates with several other promotions. Logan is recognized as the inaugural world champion of the American Wrestling Affiliates.	
2	Tony Givens	November 1, 2008	House show	Kingsport, Tennessee	1	20		
3	Brian Logan	November 21, 2008	House show	Buckhannon, West Virginia	2	70		
—	Vacated	January 30, 2009	—	Kingsport, Tennessee	—	—	The championship is vacated after moving to the Championship Wrestling Alliance.	
Championship Wrestling Alliance (CWA)
4	Brian Logan	January 30, 2009	House show	Kingsport, Tennessee	3	120	Logan, the reigning AWA World Heavyweight Champion, was awarded the CWA World Heavyweight title.	
5	Robbie Cassidy	May 30, 2009	House show	Kingsport, Tennessee	1	385		
6	Chris Richards	June 19, 2010	House show	Kingsport, Tennessee	1	230		
—	Deactivated	February 4, 2011	—	Kingsport, Tennessee	—	—	The CWA World Heavyweight Championship was retired and replaced with the NWA Smoky Mountain Heavyweight Championship on February 4, 2011 when the CWA joined the National Wrestling Alliance (NWA) and became NWA Smoky Mountain.	

=== Combined reigns ===
Rank	Wrestler	No. of reigns	Combined days
1	Robbie Cassidy	1	385
1	Brian Logan	3	385
3	Chris Richards	1	230
4	Tony Givens	1	20

Sporting positions
Preceded by NWA Worlds Heavyweight Championship	Pro Wrestling Zero1's top heavyweight championship 2004–2007	Succeeded by World Heavyweight Championship
