= WSL World Light Heavyweight Championship =

Professional wrestling championship

Details
- Promotion: Wrestling Superstars Live
- Date established: July 30, 2005
- Date retired: February 21, 2009
Statistics
- First champion: Kirby Mack
- Final champion: Kirby Mack

The WSL World Light Heavyweight Championship was a title in the Wrestling Superstars Live promotion. It was originally known as the AWA Superstars of Wrestling World Light Heavyweight Championship.

== Title history ==
Wrestler:	Times:	Date:	Location:	Notes:
Kirby Mack	1	July 30, 2005	Burlington, North Carolina	Defeated Shannon Moore in a tournament.
Xsiris	1	September 8, 2006	Charleston, West Virginia	Promoter Dale Gagne counted Mack's shoulders for three when the referee was knocked out. Gagne announced Xsiris as champion on September 27, 2006. Mack continued to claim he was still champion.
T.J. Mack	1	December 2, 2006	Burlington, North Carolina	Defeated Xsiris and Kirby Mack in a ladder match to become undisputed champion.
Kirby Mack	2	January 7, 2007	Pottstown, Pennsylvania	Defeated T.J. Mack, Shane Hagadorn, Pelle Primeau, Alex Payne, and Rhett Titus. The championship is renamed to the WSL World Light Heavyweight Championship after the promotion is forced to change its name to Wrestling Superstars Live.
The championship is retired on February 21, 2009 when WSL goes out of business. Mack continues to defend a version of the championship until 2012.

== See also ==
- AWA World Light Heavyweight Championship, original version.
