= WSL World Tag Team Championship =

Professional wrestling tag team championship

Details
- Promotion: Wrestling Superstars Live
- Date established: June 27, 1999
- Date retired: 2009
Statistics
- First champions: Heaven and Hell
- Final champions: Team Vision (Chasyn Rance and Mister Saint Laurent)

The WSL World Tag Team Championship was a tag team championship in the Wrestling Superstars Live promotion. It was created in 1999 as the AWA Superstars of Wrestling World Tag Team Championship.

== Title history ==
Wrestlers:	Times:	Date:	Location:	Notes:
Heaven and Hell	1	June 27, 1999	Fargo, North Dakota	Defeated The Bushwhackers (Butch and Luke) to become the inaugural champions.
The Golden Lion and Jonnie Stewart	1	September 6, 1999	Bozeman, Montana	Defeated Heaven and Hell and two other teams in a four-way match.
Heaven and Hell	2	October 9, 1999	Joliet, Illinois	Defeated The Golden Lion and The Iron Sheik, subbing for Stewart.
The Corporate Stooges (Tony DeNucci and Jonnie Stewart)	1	September 1, 2001	Gallup, New Mexico	
Native Blood (Ghostwalker and Navajo Warrior)	1	September 1, 2001	Gallup, New Mexico	
Models, Inc. (Charming Chad and Ghostwalker/G.Q. Gallo)	1	March 26, 2004	Casa Grande, Arizona	Ghostwalker turned on Navajo Warrior and teamed with Charming Chad to defeat Navajo Warrior and Evan Karagias to win the championship. Ghostwalker changed his name to G.Q. Gallo.
Titles vacated in July 2004 when Charming Chad signs a developmental contract with World Wrestling Entertainment.
The Henchmen (Buddha the Beast and Venom)	1	July 2004	Chicago, Illinois	Awarded the titles.
Titles vacated in 2005 in order to be put on the line in a tournament.
The Henchmen (Buddha the Beast and Venom)	2	December 5, 2005	Las Vegas, Nevada	
Team Macktion (Kirby and T.J. Mack)	1	June 14, 2006	Indianapolis, Indiana	
The Old School Blondes (Steve Corino and Ricky Landell)	1	June 14, 2006	Indianapolis, Indiana	
The New Generation Dynasty (Ric Converse and Xsiris)	1	March 23, 2007	Cameron, North Carolina	Defeated Ricky Landell and Jonnie Stewart, subbing for Corino, who was on an Australian tour.
Titles vacated on June 13, 2007 and awarded to Jonnie Stewart and Ricky Landell.
Jonnie Stewart and Ricky Landell	1	June 13, 2007	Indianapolis, Indiana	
Buff Bagwell and The Patriot	1	June 13, 2007	Indianapolis, Indiana	
Titles vacated in June 2007.
The Heartbreak Express (Phil and Sean Davis)	1	October 6, 2007	Shawano, Wisconsin	Won an 18-team tournament for vacant titles.
Frankie DeFalco and Jake Milliman	1	February 8, 2008	—	
The Heartbreak Express (Phil and Sean Davis)	1	February 25, 2008	—	
Team Vision (Chasyn Rance and Mister Saint Laurent)	1	April 18, 2008	Fayetteville, West Virginia	The Heartbreak Express did not appear to make a scheduled defense so promoter Dale Gagne ordered that the winners of a 2008 Mountain Mayhem tournament match between Team Vision and Team Macktion (Kirby and T.J. Mack) be declared the new champions.
Titles vacated in late 2008. WSL goes out of business on February 21, 2009 but the titles continued to exist. A tournament to fill the titles was to be held in Statesville, North Carolina on March 6, 2009; there is no indication that the tournament was ever held. A match to fill the titles was scheduled for Sheridan, Colorado on May 29, 2009 but that match was not held when the venue cancelled the event over trademark violations. The championships were retired in late 2009, though Team Vision continued to defend a version of the titles until 2012.
