= Corey Graves =

American professional wrestling commentator

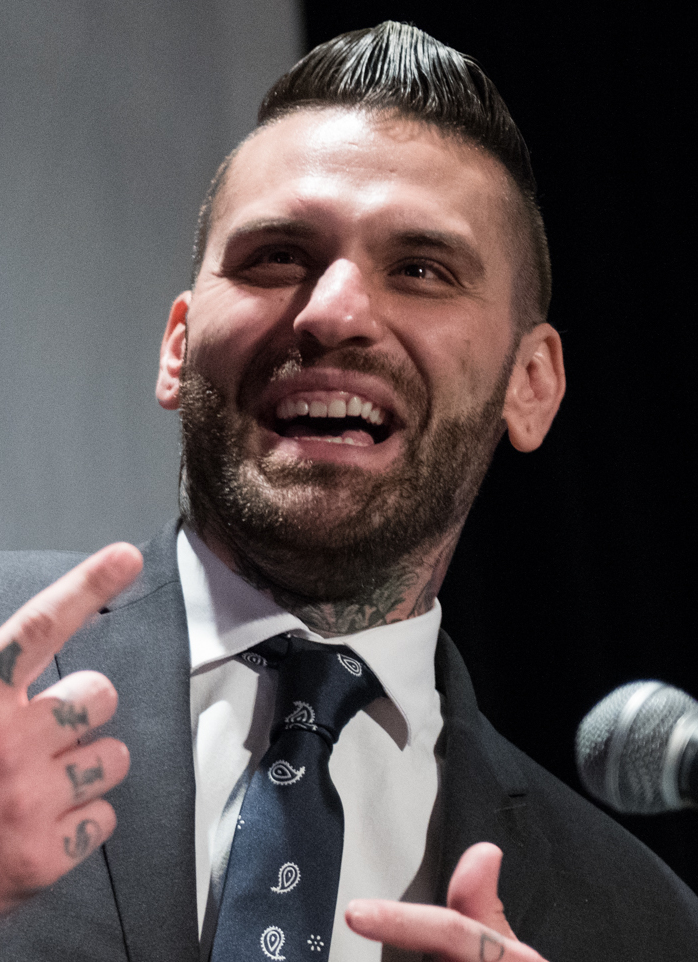
- Graves in 2018

Personal information
- Born: Matthew Polinsky; February 24, 1984 (age 42) Pittsburgh, Pennsylvania, U.S.
- Spouses: Amy Schneider (m. 2009; div. 2020); Carmella (m. 2022)
- Children: 5
- Family: Dan Polinsky (father); Sam Adonis (brother)

Professional wrestling career
- Ring name(s): Corey Graves; Sterling Keenan; Sterling James Keenan
- Billed height: 6 ft 1 in (185 cm)
- Billed weight: 208 lb (94 kg)
- Billed from: The Sunset Strip; Iron City, Pennsylvania; Pittsburgh, Pennsylvania
- Trained by: Boomer Payne; Quinn Magnum; Dory Funk Jr. Mad Mike
- Debut: March 22, 2000
- Retired: December 11, 2014

Matthew Polinsky (born February 24, 1984) is an American sports commentator, university professor, and retired professional wrestler. He is signed to WWE, where he performs under the ring name Corey Graves as the color commentator on the SmackDown brand as well as the English play-by-play commentator in its sister promotion, Lucha Libre AAA Worldwide. As a former in-ring competitor, he is a one-time NXT Tag Team Champion, and won the WWE 24/7 Champion once even though he had been retired from in-ring competition.

Polinsky is also known for his work on the independent circuit under the ring name Sterling James Keenan.

== Early life ==
Polinsky was born and raised in Pittsburgh, Pennsylvania. He attended college and obtained a degree in marketing.

== Professional wrestling career ==
=== Independent promotions (2000–2009) ===
Polinsky chose his ring name the night before his first professional wrestling match, and picked the name Sterling James Keenan as a tribute to Sterling Sharpe, Polinsky's favorite American football player as a child, and Maynard James Keenan of the band Tool.

Keenan debuted on March 22, 2000. Throughout the next few years, Keenan appeared for various promotions, including Dory Funk Jr.'s "Funking Conservatory", where he competed with wrestlers including Paul London, Adam Windsor, and Onyx. In 2002, Keenan teamed with "Dreamachine" Chris Cage to win the Funkin Conservatory Tag Team Championship by defeating the team of London and Windsor.

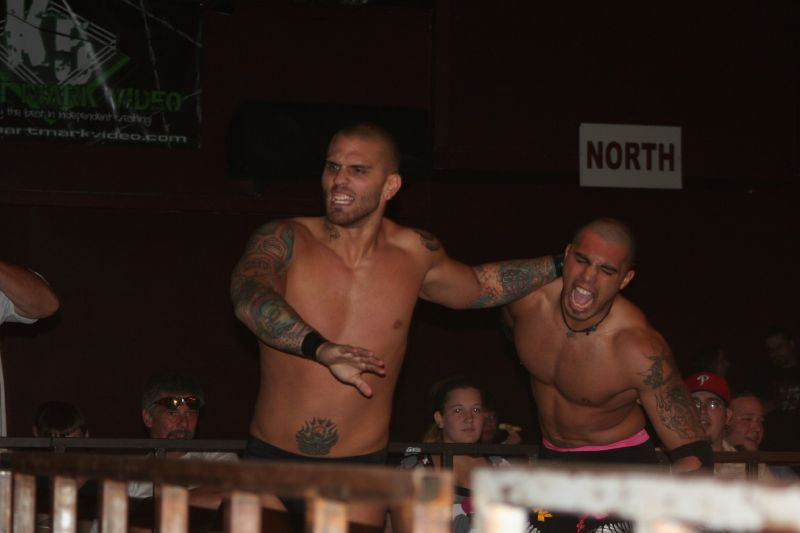
Sterling James Keenan (left) wrestling Shiima Xion (right) for Velocity Pro Wrestling, 2008

Keenan also made appearances for NWA Upstate, Independent Wrestling Association Mid-South, Cleveland All-Pro Wrestling, and Full Throttle Wrestling. On April 26, 2002, in NWA East / Pro Wrestling eXpress, Keenan and Mad Mike won the NWA East Tag Team Championship by defeating The Premiere Players. Keenan was part of the Union of Independent Professional Wrestlers promotion in both of its incarnations. He won the UIPW Keystone Cruiserweight Championship. Beginning in 2005, he appeared regularly for Far North Wrestling (FNW), and on November 2, 2007, he won a Battle royal to win the FNW Heavyweight Championship. He defeated Samoa Joe and Rikishi by countout on August 23, 2007 to win the Ballpark Brawl Natural Heavyweight Title. On February 24, 2008, Keenan won Absolute Intense Wrestling's Heavyweight Championship by winning a 30-Man gauntlet match.

Keenan competed for Pro Wrestling Zero1 and won the Zero-One United States Heavyweight Championship on two occasions. On March 8, 2008, Keenan defeated Mr. Wrestling 3 in Pittsburgh, Pennsylvania to win the championship for the first time. He only held the championship for a week before dropping it to Dr. X on March 15 in Morganville, New Jersey. On May 9, Keenan won the championship for the second time, defeating Jake Manning in Limerick, Pennsylvania. He held the championship for just under a month before losing it to Rick Landell on June 1.

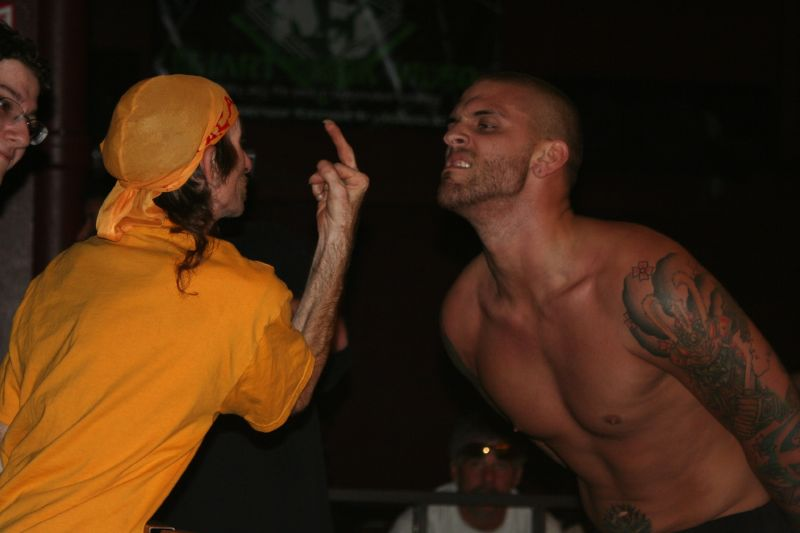
Sterling James Keenan confronts a fan at the former ECW Arena, 2008

Throughout the years, Keenan has also made sporadic appearances for Ring of Honor (ROH). His debut appearance for the promotion was at Round Robin Challenge II on April 25, 2003, where he teamed with E. Z. Money in a Tag Team Scramble match won by The S.A.T. He returned to ROH over two years later at Redemption on August 12, 2005, where he participated in a Four Corner Survival match won by Ace Steel. In October 2005, he lost a singles match to Claudio Castagnoli and a singles match between Keenan and Steel at Tag Wars 2006 in January 2006 ended in a no contest due to interference from Chris Hero and the Necro Butcher. Six months later, at In Your Face, Keenan and Jason Blade lost a tag team match to The Briscoe Brothers. He made a single appearance in ROH in 2007 at the Fifth Year Festival: Dayton event, losing to Jimmy Rave and another appearance in March 2009 at Steel City Clash, losing to Delirious. He also appeared on the Ring of Honor Wrestling television show on the April 4, 2009 episode, losing to Erick Stevens.

==== International Wrestling Cartel (2002–2007) ====
Keenan debuted in the International Wrestling Cartel (IWC) on October 19, 2002, defeating Troy Lords. On the following IWC show, Keenan defeated CM Punk, before losing to Shirley Doe on two occasions but defeating Josh Prohibition. On December 28, Keenan teamed with Dustin Ardine to challenge the Devil's Advocates for the IWC Tag Team Championship, but were unsuccessful. In May 2003, Keenan participated in IWC's Super Indy tournament, defeating B. J. Whitmer in the first round, but losing to Colt Cabana in the second.

At IWC's Revengeance show in September, Keenan defeated Al B. Damm to earn a match for the IWC Heavyweight Championship. He received his championship match on November 1, 2003, and defeated Dennis Gregory to win the championship. At Rebirth of Extreme on November 22, Keenan successfully retained the championship in a rematch against Gregory, and made further successful defences against Punk on December 12, Dean Radford on January 31, 2004, and February 24, and against Super Hentai on March 6. Two weeks later, on March 20, Keenan lost the IWC Heavyweight Championship to Radford, and failed to regain it in a rematch on April 3, and on April 17, when he lost a Tables match to Radford.

In July 2004, Keenan unsuccessfully challenged Chris Sabin for the IWC Super Indy Championship. That December, after Sabin had vacated the IWC Super Indy Championship, Keenan won a four-way match against Petey Williams, Josh Prohibition, and John McChesney to win the vacant championship. He made a successful defense of the championship against AJ Styles on February 24, 2005, and Claudio Castagnoli the following night. In April he retained the championship against Nate Webb, before losing a championship match to Justin Idol by countout in final championship defense on April 29, 2005. That same night, McChesney won the Super Indy Tournament, winning the championship as part of his victory, despite having not beaten Keenan. The next night, a match for the championship between Keenan and McChesney ended in a double countout.

In March 2006, Keenan unsuccessfully challenged Doe for the IWC Heavyweight Championship. That September, Keenan was part of a tournament for the vacant IWC Heavyweight Championship, but was eliminated in the first round after losing to Ricky Reyes. On August 4, 2007, Keenan lost another match for the championship, this time to long-time rival Dennis Gregory, in what proved to be his final match in the company.

=== One Pro Wrestling (2005–2009) ===
Keenan made his debut for the United Kingdom-based 1 Pro Wrestling (1PW) at their inaugural show, A Cruel Twist of Fate, on October 1, 2005, defeating D'Lo Brown. He quickly formed an alliance with Abyss, and the pair defeated Sabu and Ulf Herman in a hardcore tag team match on January 7, 2006. In March, Keenan competed in a tournament to determine the inaugural 1PW Heavyweight Champion, but was defeated by AJ Styles in a quarter-final match.

He moved on to feud with Spud, defeating him on May 26 at Know Your Enemy Night One. At Fight Club 2 in July, Keenan defeated Spud in an Iron City Street Fight. Three weeks later, Keenan replaced Matt Hyson in a tag team match, where he and Spud challenged Jody Fleisch and Jonny Storm for the 1PW Tag Team Championship. They were unsuccessful after Keenan attacked Spud during the match. At Invincible in August, a tag team match featuring Keenan and Hyson versus Spud and Teddy Hart ended in a no contest after several other wrestlers interfered, prompting a 10-man elimination tag team match, which Keenan's team won.

At Resurrection in April 2007, Keenan challenged Romeo Roselli for the Nu-Wrestling Evolution Heavyweight Championship, but was disqualified for using the championship belt as a weapon. He then began challenging Ulf Herman for the 1PW Heavyweight Championship, but was unsuccessful in a four-way match on June 29 when Herman retained the championship. Keenan failed to win the championship again on June 30 and August 18. On October 13, at 2nd Anniversary Show, Keenan defeated Herman to win the championship in a steel cage match. Keenan successfully defended the championship against Doug Williams on January 25, 2008, and Martin Stone, Darren Burridge and Abyss in a four-way match the following night. His next defense was on October, when he lost to Johnny Moss via disqualification, and retaining the championship as a result. At the 3rd Anniversary Show that same month, Keenan retained the championship against Raven. Keenan eventually lost the championship to Martin Stone on April 18, 2009 at To The Extreme, ending his championship reign at 554 days. He continued to feud with Stone in an unsuccessful attempt to regain the championship throughout 2009, and made his final 1PW appearance at the 4th Anniversary Show in November.

=== WWE / Lucha Libre AAA Worldwide (2006–2007; 2011–present) ===
==== Enhancement talent (2006–2007) ====
Before signing a contract with WWE, Keenan made several appearances for the company. On April 26, 2006, Keenan and CM Punk lost a dark match to The Gymini prior to the SmackDown taping. On June 6, 2006, Keenan teamed with Jon Bolen in a loss to Jamie Noble and Kid Kash. Keenan appeared on an episode of WWE Heat that was taped on August 6, losing to Val Venis. Keenan appeared on the August 10, 2007, episode of SmackDown!, where he was easily squashed by Mark Henry.

==== Developmental territories (2011–2014) ====
In August 2011, it was reported that Polinsky had signed a developmental contract with WWE. Polinsky announced that he would be performing in WWE's developmental territory, Florida Championship Wrestling (FCW), under the ring name Corey Graves. He debuted at the FCW television tapings on September 25, losing to Erick Rowan. The following year, on March 17, 2012, Graves won the FCW Florida Tag Team Championship with Jake Carter by defeating Bo Rotundo and Husky Harris. When WWE rebranded FCW into NXT, Graves and Carter participated in the inaugural tapings in June 2012. They defeated CJ Parker and Nick Rogers in a match that aired in July.

Graves was re-established as a villainous singles wrestler on November 14 with a win over Oliver Grey; Following a submission victory over Yoshi Tatsu in December, Graves attacked the NXT Champion Seth Rollins, and was awarded a title match on the January 2, 2013 episode of NXT. Graves failed to capture the championship despite winning via disqualification following interference from Rollins' associates in The Shield. After singles victories over former partner Carter and Alex Riley, Graves faced Conor O'Brian in a number one contender's match; the match ended in a no contest after The Shield attacked both men, and Graves later lost in a triple threat number one contender's match. Graves transitioned into a feud with The Shield, challenging them to a match for costing him title opportunities, turning face in the process. He faced Rollins in a lumberjack match, which he lost when the other members of The Shield interfered, therefore cementing his face turn. In May, Graves began feuding with The Wyatt Family following a confrontation (and later match) with leader Bray Wyatt. After being eliminated by Wyatt in a battle royal, Graves teamed with Kassius Ohno to unsuccessfully challenge Luke Harper and Erick Rowan for the NXT Tag Team Championship, and Graves, Ohno, and Adrian Neville lost to The Wyatt Family in a six-man tag team match. After the Wyatts injured Ohno in storyline, Graves began regularly teaming with Neville, and on the July 18 episode of NXT, they defeated Harper and Rowan to capture the NXT Tag Team Championship. The duo held the championship for nearly three months, before losing to The Ascension in September. After failing to regain the title, Graves attacked Neville to provoke a feud, thus turning heel. They traded victories, before Graves suffered a legitimate concussion, rendering him temporarily inactive. He returned in January 2014, to enter a feud with Sami Zayn. Graves defeated Zayn on April 3 but was defeated in a 6-man tag team match teaming with The Ascension against Zayn and The Usos. Graves then suffered a second concussion, causing him to be absent from television for several months.

==== Pre-show panelist (2014–2015) ====
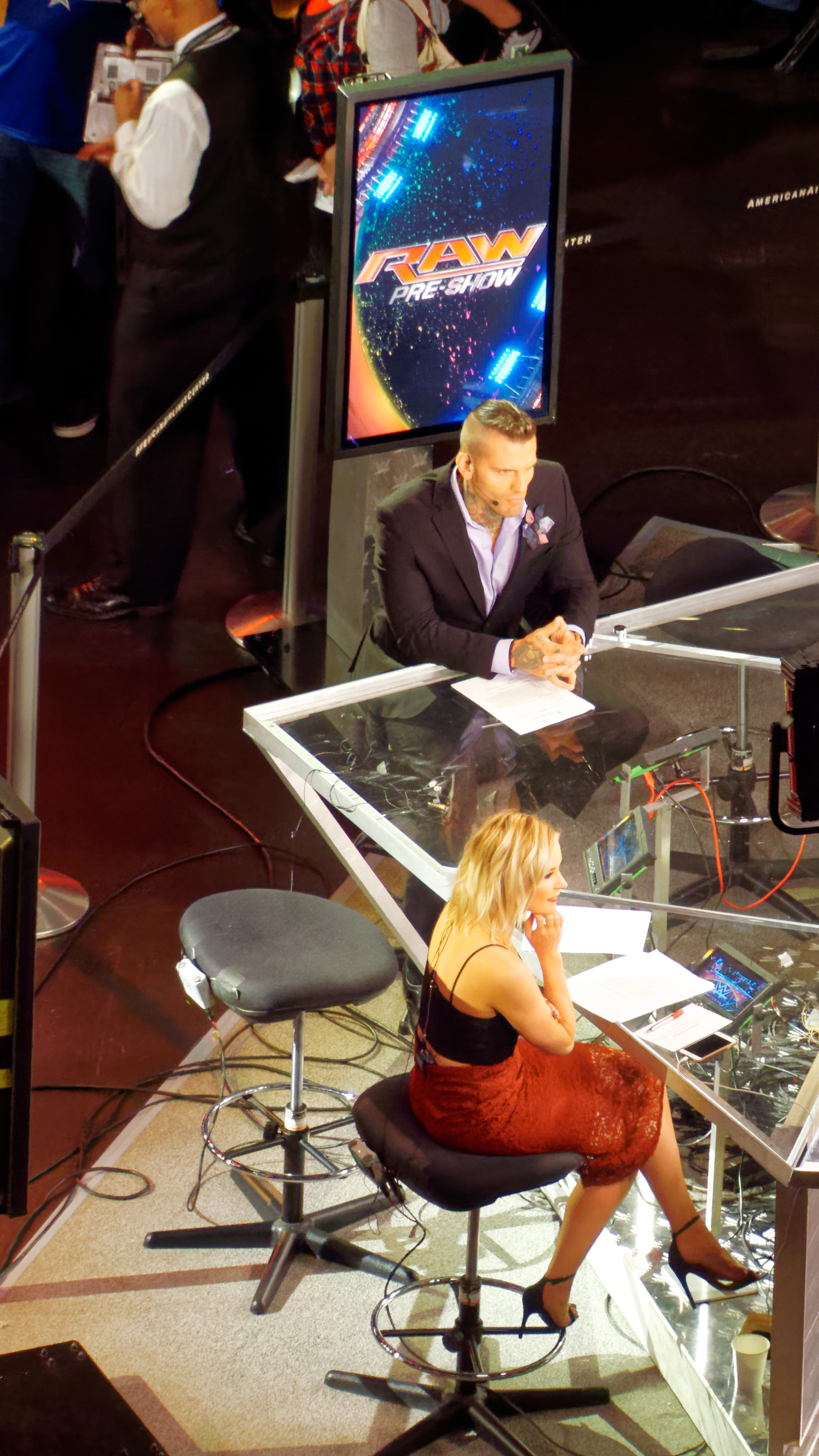
Graves (top) on the Raw pre-show alongside Renee Young in 2016

Graves returned on the NXT TakeOver: R Evolution pre-show on December 11, where he announced his official in-ring retirement due to his concussion issues. He also announced that he would be joining NXT's commentary team with immediate effect, with his duties beginning at that event.

Graves was then offered a two-year commentary contract by Triple H, and was later added to the pre-show panel for Raw.

He is also the host of WWE Culture Shock, a WWE Network original series. In August 2015, following Dolph Ziggler's 2014 shout-out to the My Little Pony: Friendship Is Magic fandom, March's reveal of Xavier Woods as a member of said fandom, and Sheamus being shamed in April by Ziggler about Bronies on TV, he attended BronyCon at the Baltimore Convention Center to investigate the fandom, where he dressed in an Applejack costume and interviewed Bronies. WWE released a free preview of the episode on August 26, 2015 following the August 22 NXT TakeOver: Brooklyn event and the August 23 SummerSlam event.

==== Commentator (2016–present) ====
Following the 2016 WWE draft, it was announced that Graves would be joining the Raw commentary team. On July 25, on the first post brand split episode of Raw, Graves began serving as a color commentator alongside Michael Cole and Byron Saxton. On November 29, Graves joined the commentary team for the Cruiserweight division's WWE Network exclusive show, 205 Live, alongside Mauro Ranallo and Austin Aries. Despite being drafted to Raw, Graves continued to provide color commentary for NXT until the February 1, 2017 episode. On the pre-show for NXT TakeOver: San Antonio, Graves announced he would be leaving NXT after that event, with Nigel McGuinness taking his place on commentary.

In March 2017, following Ranallo's absence from commentary and Aries' return to in-ring action, Graves would be joined by Tom Phillips on commentary for 205 Live. On the May 29 episode of Raw, Graves would directly report to Raw general manager Kurt Angle about some "scandalous information" that was sent to him about Angle, with Angle telling Graves that if the news broke out, it would ruin him. On the June 19 episode of Raw, as Angle tried to resolve the mystery of who attacked both Enzo and Cass over the last few weeks, Graves would show security footage of Big Cass faking his attack, which led to Cass revealing himself as the one who attacked Enzo Amore, before attacking Amore once again, officially disbanding the team. Graves would continue to support Angle about his personal information that was sent to him, which Angle would reveal on the July 17 episode of Raw, announcing that Jason Jordan was his storyline son. On September 4, it was announced that Graves would also join the SmackDown Live announce team after JBL departed from the company, making Graves the only current announcer to commentate both Raw and SmackDown Live, as a heel color commentator.

On September 26, 2019, WWE announced as a part of their "WWE Premiere Week" that a new commentary team will be on all three brands. Later, it was announced that Graves would now be a commentator and analyst only for SmackDown. On the April 12, 2021 edition of Raw after WrestleMania 37, Graves returned to the Raw broadcast booth, replacing Samoa Joe. In turn, podcaster and radio show host Pat McAfee would replace Graves as the Friday Night SmackDown color commentator. On the November 8 edition of Raw, Graves would pin Akira Tozawa at ringside to win the WWE 24/7 Championship, only to lose it immediately afterward to Byron Saxton.

On February 11, 2022, Graves subbed in for Pat McAfee on an episode of Friday Night SmackDown. On the April 4 episode of Raw, after Graves' wife, Carmella, was attacked by her tag team partner, Zelina Vega, for losing the WWE Women's Tag Team Championships at Wrestlemania 38, Graves consoled her at ringside, eventually sharing a kiss between the two. As McAfee was hired by ESPN for its College GameDay coverage, Graves temporarily returned on the September 9 episode of SmackDown as a color commentator which this arrangement lasted until the end of the college football season.

Graves returned to SmackDown as color commentator with Kevin Patrick joining in as play-by-play commentator on August 11, 2023. On February 2, 2024, Graves transitioned into the lead commentator role on SmackDown, serving alongside Wade Barrett who replaced Kevin Patrick. On August 26, Graves returned to Raw to be a commentator with Michael Cole as Pat McAfee took a hiatus from WWE to return to College GameDay.

At NXT: New Year's Evil on January 7, 2025, Graves returned to NXT for the first time since 2017 as part of the revamped commentary team alongside Vic Joseph and Booker T. However, the following week Graves criticized WWE's decision to move him from SmackDown to NXT. He said in a post on X that he would address his criticisms on NXT, but was reportedly pulled from the show. Graves returned to commentary on January 21. On the June 16 episode of Raw, Graves briefly returned to the main roster commentary team, filling in for Pat McAfee. Graves would later return to the main roster full-time due to McAfee taking a hiatus from commentary. On the September 19 episode of SmackDown, Graves would be attacked by Brock Lesnar, receiving two F5's, after Graves would try to reason with Lesnar not to harm Michael Cole. This would set up a storyline introduction to the return of Pat McAfee at Wrestlepalooza as a commentator.

Following WWE's acquisition of Lucha Libre AAA Worldwide in August 2025, Graves became the English language play-by-play commentator for all AAA major events along with its weekly TV show that premiered on January 17, 2026.

On the WWE Raw on Netflix Anniversary Show on January 5, 2026, Graves and Michael Cole returned to Raw.

== Career in education ==
As of 2026, Polinsky works as a professor for Point Park University in Pittsburgh, PA, teaching a class in broadcasting.

== Other media ==
Polinsky, as Corey Graves, made his video game debut as a playable character in WWE 2K15, where on the Xbox 360 and PlayStation 3 versions of the game, he has his own path in the "Who Got NXT" mode, documenting his matches in NXT and on the Xbox One and PlayStation 4 versions as an unlockable character through the MyCareer mode. He later appeared in WWE 2K18, WWE 2K19, WWE 2K20, WWE 2K22, WWE 2K23, WWE 2K24 and WWE 2K25 as a non-playable character as part of the commentary team.

Polinsky was a part of E:60 documentary: "WWE: Behind the Curtain". From October 2015 to April 2016, Polinsky wrote a monthly column for Alternative Press entitled "Stay Loud." The column covered the intersection of wrestling and music.

Polinsky has also delved into the fashion industry with Fatal Clothing's "Stay Down" collection.

Polinsky, as his Corey Graves persona, launched his own podcast (produced by WWE and Endeavor Audio) titled WWE After the Bell, which debuted in October 2019. In June 2020, he would launch a second podcast called Bare with Us alongside his real life wife Leah Van Dale, where the two discuss different issues regarding relationships including issues within their own.

=== Filmography ===
Year	Title	Role	Notes
2011	Kingdom of Gladiators	Gunnar	
2020	The Main Event	Himself	

== Personal life ==
Polinsky is of Hungarian descent. His father and younger brother are also involved in professional wrestling. His father Dan is a professional wrestling promoter, and his younger brother Sam is a professional wrestler best known under the ring name "Sam Adonis", and has notably competed in Mexico for Consejo Mundial de Lucha Libre (CMLL) and Lucha Libre AAA Worldwide, and the National Wrestling Alliance (NWA). As of 2020, he and his ex-wife, Amy (Schneider) Polinsky, have three children together.

Outside of professional wrestling, Polinsky is a professional piercer. After training as an apprentice at the request of a friend of his who needed a piercer in his tattoo shop, he has worked in the Naughty Vibrations shop in Greensburg, Pennsylvania and in a shop named True Image in New Kensington, Pennsylvania. Polinsky is known for his numerous tattoos. He got two of them before the age of 16 with his parents' permission, and after turning 18, got sleeve tattoos on both his arms, made up of several clearly visible and separate tattoos tied together with designs. He also has tattoos on his neck, and has the words "stay down" tattooed across his knuckles.

Polinsky is described as a typical yinzer and often shows pride in being from Pittsburgh on WWE programming, often mentioning his bar-hopping on Pittsburgh's South Side and mentioning his favorite places to visit. He did, however, admit that upon joining the WWE commentary team he had to significantly tone down his natural Pittsburghese dialect only to see fellow Pittsburgh native Pat McAfee become successful on WWE commentary because of it.

In early 2019, Polinsky's ex-wife posted a picture to her Instagram page stating that Polinsky had been having an affair with WWE wrestler Leah Van Dale, known by the ring name Carmella. The post was deleted shortly after and it was confirmed that the pair had already been separated and were already in the divorce process. Their relationship was later profiled in the 9th season of the reality show Total Divas. In October 2021, Van Dale and Polinsky got engaged. The two were married on April 7, 2022. In October 31, 2022, his wife revealed in her instagram account, that she had an ectopic pregnancy, which caused a miscarriage. On May 1, 2023, the couple announced they were once again expecting on Instagram. On November 8, 2023, their son was born. On April 29, 2025, Polinsky and Van Dale announced that they were expecting their second son, who was born on October 10, 2025.

== Legacy ==
Legendary Professional wrestling commentator and WWE Hall of Famer Jim Ross has stated that "Graves is the brightest young on-air talent that WWE has developed in years".

Fellow WWE commentator and broadcast colleague, Michael Cole has praised Graves stating "We gave him a chance and he really worked hard at it. This didn't come to him easy. He put a lot of time in at the Performance Center, and hours and hours of work. "We put him on Raw, and he took off. He's the new guy, he's the new heel. "He's got a unique presence, he's got sarcasm and he's got wit, and he also has the experience of being in the ring, being a former NXT tag team champion. He has everything. A good looking young kid - he's the future of what we do here".

Professional wrestling promoter and booker Eric Bischoff has praised Graves as an "amazingly talented guy" and "an exceptional talent". Bischoff also further reiterated that Graves is "Very different, has his own way about him. He's got a vibe and an approach to the business that I really love, and I think it makes him unique. But think about that. Think about how much wrestling, how many stories, think about what Corey Graves in particular had to do every week. Unless you've done that job, even if you've done that job, it's hard to imagine".

Professional wrestling Legend and WWE Hall of Famer Arn Anderson, has also praised Graves stating "He obviously has the in-ring background, he has a cool look, it feels like he's 'inside baseball' enough and up on his stuff where 'smart fans' can enjoy his work, he checks Vince's boxes". "Just his appearance alone made you pay attention and he appealed to a younger crowd and I think you have to have a mix of different announcers that cover and check different boxes just like you have talent and Corey was a guy that was opinionated. I don't how much of those opinions were his own and those projected for him to have, but he fits in with that younger demographic and you're always wanting to grab that, that's for sure."

Fellow WWE commentator colleague and broadcast partner Byron Saxton has praised Graves stating "there's been so many greats but when you look at Jesse [Ventura] and Bobby [Heenan] and all these great color guys, The King [Jerry Lawler], who have been in this company, you know, Corey [Graves] is right up there. He is so talented, he is so witty and it's a blessing for this company to have someone as talented as he is and I'm very fortunate I've been able to work with him as long as I have".

== Championships and accomplishments ==
- 1 Pro Wrestling
  - 1PW Heavyweight Championship (1 time)
- Absolute Intense Wrestling
  - AIW Absolute Championship (1 time)
- Ballpark Brawl
  - Natural Heavyweight Championship (1 time)
- Far North Wrestling
  - FNW Heavyweight Championship (1 time)
- Florida Championship Wrestling
  - FCW Florida Tag Team Championship (1 time) – with Jake Carter
- Funkin' Conservatory
  - FC Tag Team Championship (1 time) – with Chris Cage
- International Wrestling Cartel
  - IWC Heavyweight Championship (1 time)
  - IWC Super Indy Championship (1 time)
- NWA East
  - NWA East Heavyweight Championship (1 time)
  - NWA East Tag Team Championships (1 time) – with Mad Mike
  - NWA North American Tag Team Championships (1 time) – with Brandon K
- One Pro Wrestling
  - 1PW World Heavyweight Championship (1 time)
- Pro Wrestling Illustrated
  - Ranked No. 118 of the top 500 wrestlers in the PWI 500 in 2013
- Pro Wrestling Zero1
  - Zero-One United States Heavyweight Championship (2 times)
- Renegade Wrestling Alliance
  - RWA Heavyweight Championship (1 time)
- Union of Independent Professional Wrestlers
  - UIPW Keystone Cruiserweight Championship (1 time)
- Wolverine Pro Wrestling
  - WPW Championship (1 time)
- WWE
  - NXT Tag Team Championship (1 time) – with Adrian Neville
  - WWE 24/7 Championship (1 time)
- Wrestling Observer Newsletter
  - Worst Television Announcer (2019, 2021, 2022)

Preceded by Kevin Patrick	SmackDown lead announcer 2024	Succeeded by Michael Cole
