= 1PW Heavyweight Championship =

Professional wrestling championship

1PW World Heavyweight Championship
- Current design of the title (2022 – 2023)

Details
- Promotion: One Pro Wrestling
- Date established: 4 March 2006
- Date retired: 29 September 2023
Statistics
- First champion(s): Abyss
- Final champion(s): Will Ospreay
- Most reigns: Abyss (2 reigns)
- Longest reign: Martin Stone (681 Days)
- Shortest reign: Lionheart (95 days)
- Oldest champion: Ulf Herman (40 years, 285 days)
- Youngest champion: Sterling James Keenan (23 years, 231 days)
- Heaviest champion: Abyss (350lb (159 kg))
- Lightest champion: Sterling James Keenan (208lb (94 kg))

The One Pro Wrestling (1PW) World Heavyweight Championship was a professional wrestling world championship created and promoted by the British promotion One Pro Wrestling. The title was established in 2006 and was the highest ranked men's championship in the company. 1PW became defunct on 29 September 2023.

== Title history ==
As the company's closure on 29 September 2023, were eight reigns between seven champions. Abyss was the inaugural champion and has most reigns at two. Martin Stone's reign is the longest at 681 days. Lionheart's reign is the shortest at 95 days. Ulf Herman is the oldest champion when he won it at 40 years old, while Sterling James Keenan is the youngest champion at 23 years old.

Will Ospreay was the final champion.

=== Reigns ===
Key
No.	Overall reign number
Reign	Reign number for the specific champion
Days	Number of days held
+	Current reign is changing daily

No.	Champion	Championship change			Reign statistics		Notes	Ref.
No.	Champion	Date	Event	Location	Reign	Days	Notes	Ref.
1	Abyss	4 March 2006	All Or Nothing - Night I	Doncaster, South Yorkshire	1	84	Defeated A.J. Styles in a tournament final to become the inaugural champion.	
2	Steve Corino	27 May 2006	Know Your Enemy - Night II	Doncaster, South Yorkshire	1	145	This was a three-way match also involving Christian Cage.	
3	Abyss	19 October 2006	First Anniversary Show	Doncaster, South Yorkshire	2	86	This was a no rope barbed wire match.	
—	Vacated	13 January 2007	—	—	—	—		
4	Ulf Herman	13 January 2007	Will Not Die	Doncaster, South Yorkshire	1	273	Defeated Iceman and Jay Phoenix in a three-way match for the vacant title.	
5	Sterling James Keenan	13 October 2007	Second Anniversary Show	Doncaster, South Yorkshire	1	553	This was a Steel Cage match.	
6	Martin Stone	18 April 2009	To The Extreme - Night I	Doncaster, South Yorkshire	1	681		
—	Vacated	28 February 2011	—	—	—	—		
7	Lionheart	28 May 2011	The Last Stand	Queensferry, Wales	1	95		
—	Deactivated	31 August 2011	—	—	—	—	Title was deactivated over One Pro Wrestling's closure.	
8	Will Ospreay	22 April 2023	All or Nothing	Doncaster, South Yorkshire	1	146	This was a tournament final for reactivating the title, where Ospreay defeated Lance Archer, Cara Noir and Mark Haskins in four way match.	
—	Vacated	15 September 2023	—	—	—	—	Championship was vacated after Will Ospreay ended his working relationship with 1PW.	
—	Deactivated	29 September 2023	—	—	—	—	Title was deactivated over One Pro Wrestling's closure.	

== Combined reigns ==
As of 19 March 2025.

†	Indicates the current champion

Rank	Wrestler	No. of reigns	Combined days
1	Martin Stone	1	681
2	Sterling James Keenan	1	553
3	Ulf Herman	1	273
4	Abyss	2	170
5	Will Ospreay	1	146
6	Steve Corino	1	145
7	Lionheart	1	95
