= Pro Wrestling Zero1 =

Japanese professional wrestling promotion

- Acronym: Zero1
- Founded: January 25, 2001
- Style: Strong style
- Headquarters: Japan
- Founder(s): Shinya Hashimoto and Shinjiro Otani
- Owner: Shinjiro Otani
- Parent: Studio Backdrop
- Sister: Pro-Wrestling Sun (2006–2009)
- Formerly: Pro Wrestling Zero-One (2001–2004); Pro Wrestling Zero1-Max (2004–2008)
- Split from: New Japan Pro-Wrestling
- Website: www.pwzero1.com

Pro Wrestling Zero1 (Japanese: プロレスリングZERO1, Hepburn: Puroresuringu Zerowan; stylized as PRO WRESTLING ZERO1), often referred to simply as Zero1 and sometimes referred to as Pro Wrestling Zero1 Catch as Catch Can (stylized as ZERO1 and PRO WRESTLING ZERO1 CATCH AS CATCH CAN, respectively), is a Japanese professional wrestling promotion founded in 2001.

Formerly known as Pro Wrestling Zero-One and Pro Wrestling Zero1-Max (stylized as Pro Wrestling ZERO-ONE and Pro Wrestling Zero1-MAX, respectively), it was affiliated with the National Wrestling Alliance (NWA) from 2001 until late 2004, and briefly reaffiliated in 2011. It was also affiliated with AWA Superstars of Wrestling (AWA) from 2005 until late 2007, the Global Professional Wrestling Alliance (GPWA) from 2006 to 2009, and was affiliated with the United Wrestling Network (UWN) from 2017 to 2022.

== History ==
=== As Pro Wrestling Zero-One ===
The promotion was founded by former New Japan Pro-Wrestling (NJPW) star Shinya Hashimoto who was quickly joined by Shinjiro Otani. In 2000, Hashimoto proposed an independent promotion within NJPW called "New Japan Pro-Wrestling Zero", but the idea was shot down. When Hashimoto was fired by NJPW in November 2000, he registered the Pro Wrestling Zero-One name.

In its early years, Zero1 had working agreements with Pro Wrestling Noah (Noah), All Japan Pro Wrestling (AJPW), NJPW, Riki Pro, Hustle, Big Mouth Loud, King's Road, and Dragondoor. These agreements enabled Zero1 wrestlers to challenge for and hold the other promotions' titles. The promotion also operated their own dojo, which was referred to as the "Takeshiba Coliseum".

On November 30, 2004, Shinya Hashimoto gave up ownership of the promotion, telling the press that due to financial problems he had decided to step away from the company. A new parent company "First On Stage" was formed consisting of president Yoshiyuki Nakamura, ring announcer Oki Okidata, Shinjiro Otani and a company named Baltic Curry. First On Stage renamed the promotion to Pro Wrestling Zero1-Max, with Otani and Nakamura taking over the promotion's general operations. Among other major changes made to the promotion's structure was the decision to join AWA Superstars of Wrestling (AWA) as the alliance's only Japanese member. Due to their new affiliation with the AWA, the promotion's previous National Wrestling Alliance (NWA) affiliation was given to rival promotion NJPW.

Since April 2005, Zero1 has held yearly pay-per-view events at the Yasukuni Shrine, which is controversial for its relation to World War II. Larger Japanese wrestling promotions like NJPW, AJPW, and Noah have traditionally stayed away from such venues due to their controversial nature.

On September 12, 2006, Zero1-Max joined 12 other wrestling companies to form the Global Professional Wrestling Alliance (GPWA), a professional wrestling alliance that intended to "foster an environment of cooperation rather than competition." The alliance planned to hold occasional "Super Shows" where all member promotions would send wrestlers to compete under the GPWA banner. Noah's CEO Mitsuharu Misawa was inaugurated as the first chairman of the GPWA, while Zero1-Max's Yoshiyuki Nakamura was announced as the alliance's president. The GPWA would later fold in 2009.

=== As Pro Wrestling Zero1 ===
In 2008, the promotion shortened its name to Pro Wrestling Zero1. In 2011, the promotion returned to the NWA as their Japanese territory. In March 2011, NWA presented Zero1 with the NWA Pan-Pacific Premium Heavyweight Championship in celebration of the promotion's tenth anniversary. In July, Daisuke Sekimoto won the Fire Festival to become the first NWA Pan-Pacific Premium Heavyweight champion. Later in 2011, Zero1 left the NWA, renaming their NWA-branded championships to "New Wrestling Alliance" championships.

Following their 2011 departure from the NWA, Zero1 launched an American affiliate, Zero1 USA, taking over the promotion previously known as NWA Midwest. In 2012, an Australian division of Zero1, known as Zero1 Australia, opened in Adelaide taking over what was previously known as NWA Pro Australia; in 2014 the relationship between Zero1 and Zero1 Australia ended with the Australian-based promotion renaming to Wrestle Rampage. Later in 2012, the Zero1 Hong Kong and Zero1 Mexico branches opened. In 2013, Yoshiyuki Nakamura opened a new division of Zero1 in Belarus.

On December 17, 2013, Zero1 announced a corporate restructuring taking place at the start of the 2014.

During a September 16, 2016 press conference, Dream On Stage was announced as Zero1's new parent company. Also announced was a partnership between Zero1 and Akebono's Ōdō company. On May 22, 2017, Zero1 partnered with the United Wrestling Network to become the group's official Japanese affiliate. On July 3, 2018, it was announced that the promotion be undergoing a management change, with Yoshitaka Ono stepping down as the CEO. Katsumi Sasazaki would be appointed the representative director and president of the promotion, while Shinjiro Otani took on the chairman of the board position and Masato Tanaka and Kohei Sato split the vice-president role of the promotion.

On February 1, 2020, Zero1 president Kazuhiro Iwamoto announced that the ownership of the promotion would be transferred from the previous management company Dream On Stage to iFD. Iwamoto additionally announced a plan to reform the promotion, which would include holding a show in the Ryōgoku Kokugikan on April 13, 2021, as part of the promotion's 20th anniversary. A further goal would be holding a show in the Ryogoku Kokugikan annually, while also providing Zero1 wrestlers with fixed contracts and social security.

During a hiatus caused by the COVID-19 pandemic, the promotion suffered from severe financial problems. Kazuhiro Iwamoto resigned from his position as president while wrestlers Tatsuhito Takaiwa, Ikuto Hidaka, and Kohei Sato all departed the promotion. In July 2020, it was announced that the company was acquired by Daiko Holdings Group. That same month, they hired former Frontier Martial-Arts Wrestling women's wrestler Megumi Kudo as their general manager.

On December 27, 2024, during a press conference, it was announced that the promotion was acquired by Studio Backdrop. It was additionally announced that Zero1 affiliate Tochigi Pro-Wrestling would begin operating independently of Zero1 and Masato Tanaka would launch Zero1 Hardcore, a Zero1 affiliate based on hardcore wrestling.

== Championships ==
=== Pro Wrestling Zero1 ===
Championship	Current champion(s)	Reign	Date won	Days held	Location	Notes
World Heavyweight Championship	Junya Matsunaga	1	April 3, 2026	222+	Tokyo, Japan	Defeated Masato Tanaka at Zero1 25th Anniversary.
NWA World Junior Heavyweight Championship	Takumi Baba	2, 2	January 1, 2025	679+	Tokyo, Japan	Defeated Seiki Yoshioka at Tochi Pro Happy New Year & Shinjiro Otani Aid ~ Stand Up Again And Again.
International Junior Heavyweight Championship	Takumi Baba	2, 2	January 1, 2025	679+	Tokyo, Japan	Defeated Seiki Yoshioka at Tochi Pro Happy New Year & Shinjiro Otani Aid ~ Stand Up Again And Again.
NWA Intercontinental Tag Team Championship	Junya Matsunaga and Tsugutaka Sato	2 (3, 3)	December 27, 2025	319+	Tokyo, Japan	Defeated Hayabusa and Jinsei Shinzaki in the finals of the 2025 Furinkazan Tournament which were also disputed for the titles.
NWA International Lightweight Tag Team Championship	Naruki Doi and Takuya Sugawara	1 (1, 8)	November 7, 2026	4+	Tokyo, Japan	Defeated Van Vert Jack and Yuki Toki at Zero1.

=== Zero1 USA ===
Championship	Current champion(s)	Reign	Date won	Days held	Notes
Zero1 USA Heavyweight Championship	Benjamin Trust	1	December 9, 2023August 15th, 2026	1068+	Defeated Joey O’Riley in a steel cage match at ZERO1 USA Christmas Chaos.
Zero1 USA TNT Championship	B.A. Malkin	2	December 7, 2023	1070+	Defeated Anakin Murphy, Chris O’Brien, El DLC, Devonte Knox, and defending champion Theo White in a six-way Gold Rush Challenge match at ZERO1 USA Thursday Night Throwdown.
Zero1 USA Shining Light Championship	Rahne Victoria	3	October 21, 2023	1117+	Defeated The Luminary at ZERO1 USA 17th Anniversary Event. The championship was previously known as the Zero1 USA Women's Championship.
Zero1 USA World Junior Heavyweight Championship	Devonte Knox	1	January 20, 2024	1026+	Defeated Victor Analog by cashing in an “any title, anywhere, anytime” contract; Analog had just won the championship by winning a four-way match against Jake Parnell, Gary Jay, and defending champion DaCobra. The championship was previously known as the Zero1 USA Midwest X Division Championship.
Zero1 USA Tag Team Championship	Constant Headache (Anakin Murphy and Kenny Kalix)	1 (1, 1)	September 23, 2023	1145+	Defeated The Premier (Campbell Myers and SK Bishop) at ZERO1 USA September To Remember.

=== Super Fireworks Pro Wrestling ===
Championship	Current champion(s)	Reign	Date won	Days held	Notes
Blast King Championship	Taru	2	August 5, 2018	3020+	Defeated Yuko Miyamoto at Super Fireworks Current Blast Festival 2018 in Kawasaki.
Blast Queen Championship	Aja Kong	1	July 22, 2023	1208+	Defeat Hiroyo Matsumoto in a Super Plasma Blast Deathmatch at 23rd Midsummer Festival ~ Fire Festival 2023.
Blast King Tag Team Championship	Revengers (Masato Tanaka and Hide Kubota)	1 (1, 1)	August 18, 2019	2642+	Defeated Taru and Chris Vice at Super Fireworks Current Blast Festival 2019 in Kawasaki.

=== No longer promoted / inactive ===
Championship	Last champion(s)	Date won	Ref
NWA United National Heavyweight Championship	Chris Vice	January 18, 2020	
NWA Pan-Pacific Premium Heavyweight Championship	Akebono	May 16, 2012	
NWA World Heavyweight Championship	The Sheik	April 23, 2011	
NWA World Junior Heavyweight Championship	Craig Classic	November 6, 2010	
NWA World Super Heavyweight Championship/Zero-One O-300 Super Heavyweight Championship	Matt Ghaffari	July 6, 2003	
AWA World Heavyweight Championship	Masato Tanaka	October 26, 2007	
AWA United States Championship	Ricky Landell	June 13, 2007	
AWA Japan Women's Championship	Saki Maemura	October 10, 2007	
WWA World Junior Light Heavyweight Championship	Noiz	April 6, 2008	
Tenka-ichi Junior Heavyweight Championship	Yoshihito Sasaki	May 29, 2005	
HCW World Women's Championship	Hikaru	December 16, 2007	
Sun Championship	Sara Del Rey	March 20, 2011	
WDB Tag Team Championship	Minoru Fujita and Saki Maemura	February 26, 2009	
World-1 Heavyweight Championship	Steve Corino	January 31, 2010	
World-1 Junior Heavyweight Championship	Yoshihito Sasaki	May 29, 2005	
UPW Heavyweight Championship	Tom Howard	October 22, 2003	
Zero-One United States Heavyweight Championship	Mr. Wrestling III	November 9, 2008	
Zero1 Mexico International Championship	Sicodelico Jr.	September 5, 2012	
Zero1 Australian National Championship	Ryan Eagles	January 11, 2013	
Zero1 Ireland Heavyweight Championship	Robbie Morrissey	November 25, 2012	
Zero1 USA Indiana State Heavyweight Championship	Brutus Dylan	June 1, 2012	
Zero1 USA Heartland States Heavyweight Championship	The Sadist	March 16, 2012	
Zero1 USA Northern States Championship	Osyris	December 9, 2012	
Zero1 USA Illinois Heavyweight Championship	Frank Wyatt	September 18, 2014	
Zero1 USA Underground Championship	Brutus Dylan	June 1, 2012	
Zero1 USA Underground Tri-State Championship	Lance Storie	Unknown	
Zero1 USA Underground Tag Team Championship	Caden Ames and Lance Storie	May 5, 2012	
Zero1 USA Northeast Heavyweight Championship	Bear Bronson	August 3, 2020	

== Tournaments ==
Zero1 holds a heavyweight tournament every summer in the last week of July called the "Fire Festival" (Himatsuri) where the winner holds the "Fire Sword" (a katana) for a whole year until the next summer's tournament. They also hold a Yasukuni Shrine show every April and a yearly junior tournament called the "Tenkaichi Jr."

Tournament	Latest winner(s)	Date won
Fire Festival	Hayabusa (II)	July 4, 2025
Furinkazan	Junya Matsunaga and Tsugutaka Sato	December 27, 2025
Tenkaichi Jr.	Veny	October 17, 2025
Lion King Cup	Yoshihito Sasaki	December 4, 2003

== Affiliates ==
Promotion name	Location	Partnered on	Ref.
Pro Wrestling World-1	New Jersey	2004	
Pro-Wrestling Sun	Japan	2006	
Zero1 USA	Midwestern United States	April 29, 2011	
Zero1 Pro Wrestling Australia/Wrestle Rampage	Australia	2012	
Zero1 Ireland/Fight Factory Pro Wrestling	Ireland	2012	
Zero1 Scotland/Scottish Wrestling Alliance	Scotland	2012	
Zero1 Hong Kong/Hong Kong Pro Wrestling Federation	Hong Kong	2012	
Zero1 Mexico	Mexico	2012	
Zero1 New Belarus Pro Wrestling	Belarus	2013	
Zero1 Spain/Super Wrestling Alliance	Spain	2013	
Marvelous	Japan	2015	
Super Fireworks Pro Wrestling	Japan	2015	
Zero1 USA Northeast	Northeastern United States	2019	
Tochigi Pro-Wrestling	Tochigi Prefecture	2021	
Zero1 Hardcore	Japan	2024	
Rose Girls Pro-Wrestling	Japan	2026	

== See also ==
- Professional wrestling in Japan
- List of professional wrestling promotions in Japan
- List of National Wrestling Alliance territories
