= Wrestling Superstars Live =

Wrestling governing body

- Acronym: WSL
- Founded: 1996
- Defunct: 2009
- Style: American wrestling
- Headquarters: Rochester, Minnesota
- Founder(s): Dale Gagne; Jonnie Stewart
- Owner: Dale Gagne
- Formerly: AWA Superstars of Wrestling
- Predecessor: Unofficial: American Wrestling Association

Wrestling Superstars Live (WSL), previously known as AWA Superstars of Wrestling (AWA), was a governing body for a group of independent professional wrestling promotions that sanctioned various championships. It was founded in 1996 by Dale Gagne and Jonnie Stewart and closed in 2009.

== History ==
=== Early history ===
In 1996, Dale Gagner, billing himself as "Dale Gagne", and his associate Jonnie Stewart, former American Wrestling Association (AWA) employees, began using the AWA name in the state of Minnesota, falsely claiming authorization from the Minnesota Secretary of State, and formed an organization known as AWA Superstars of Wrestling. They billed the organization as a continuation of the American Wrestling Association, which closed in 1991.

By 2005, the organization began to franchise the AWA Superstars of Wrestling name, selling memberships to existing independent promotions around the United States, Canada, United Kingdom, and Japan. Several members of AWA Superstars of Wrestling were former members of the National Wrestling Alliance. In a press release sent out on October 30, 2007, the organization announced that it would no longer sanction independent promotions. Gagner and Stewart noted that each of the remaining territories would be individually assessed.

=== Lawsuit, renaming, reorganization, and closure ===
On April 26, 2007 World Wrestling Entertainment (WWE) filed a lawsuit against Dale Gagner, citing trademark infringement, as WWE owned some American Wrestling Association properties due to their purchase of AWA from Verne Gagne. In a move to sidestep WWE, Jonnie Stewart, with the help of a Chicago-based copyright law firm, attempted to trademark the name "American Wrestling Alliance" instead.

On October 29, 2008, a settlement was reached between Gagner and WWE. The court ruling prohibits Gagner from use of the AWA name or any other derivatives. As a result, the organization was renamed to Wrestling Superstars Live (WSL). In 2009, WSL went out of business.

== Championships ==
When the organization was formed in 1996, Wrestling Superstars Live claimed the lineages and names of the original American Wrestling Association (AWA) championships. However, following WWE's lawsuit against Gagner and Stewart, Wrestling Superstars Live ignored the AWA championship reigns and only the reigns from 1996 and forward were recognized.

| Championship | Final champion(s) | Date won | Location | Previous holder |
|---|---|---|---|---|
| World Heavyweight Championship | Keith Walker | February 21, 2009 | Michigan City, Indiana | Ricky Landell |
| World Fighting Championship | Keith Walker | September 13, 2008 | Waukesha, Wisconsin | Ricky Landell |
| World Light Heavyweight Championship | Kirby Mack | January 7, 2007 | Pottstown, Pennsylvania | T.J. Mack |
| World Tag Team Championship | Team Vision (Chasyn Rance and Mister Saint Laurent) | April 18, 2008 | Fayetteville, West Virginia | The championship was vacant; Team Vision won the 2008 Mountain Mayhem tournament by defeating Team Macktion (Kirby Mack and T.J. Mack) in the finals |

Four championships were retired prior to WSL's closure:

- The AWA Superstars of Wrestling International Heavyweight Championship was retired in 2005.
- The AWA Japan Women's Championship was replaced by the HCW World Women's Championship in December 2007.
- The AWA World Junior Heavyweight Championship was re-branded as the "Zero1-Max International Junior Heavyweight Championship" in 2008.
- The AWA Superstars of Wrestling United States Championship was replaced by the WSL World Fighting Championship in March 2008.

== Championship history ==
=== International Heavyweight Championship ===
==== Title history ====
| Wrestler: | Times: | Date: | Location: | Notes: |
|---|---|---|---|---|
Title created by AWA Superstars of Wrestling, with the promotion claiming lineage to the original AWA International Heavyweight Championship.
| Jonnie Stewart | 1 | April 23, 1999 | — | Stewart defeated George Petroski to become the inaugural champion. |
Title vacated on April 14, 2000 after Stewart failed to make a defense.
| Danny Dominion | 1 | April 14, 2000 | Blythe, California | Dominion defeated Navajo Warrior to win the vacant championship. |
Title vacated in 2002.
| Erik Watts | 1 | February 4, 2005 | Tucson, Arizona | Watts defeated Diamond Dallas Page to win the vacant championship. |
The championship was retired in 2005 following a declaration of the AWA Board of Directors.

== Members ==
Wrestling Superstars Live had members in the United States, Canada, England, Japan, and Australia.

| Promotion | Location | Years |
|---|---|---|
| All Action Wrestling | Western Australia | November 2007 – 2009 |
| AWA Florida | Florida | 2005 – 2009 |
| AWA Rush | Minnesota | 2007 |
| AWA United Kingdom | England | 2005 – 2006 |
| Brew City Wrestling | Wisconsin | 2005 – 2008 |
| Canadian Wrestling Federation | Manitoba | August 2005 – April 2007 |
| Carolina Wrestling Federation | North Carolina | 2005 – 2007 |
| Elite Canadian Championship Wrestling | British Columbia | 2006 |
| Hawai'i Championship Wrestling | Hawaii | 2006 – 2007 |
| Millennium Wrestling Federation | Massachusetts | March 2005 – 2007 |
| Mountaineer Wrestling Association | West Virginia | 2005 – 2008 |
| National Championship Wrestling | Tennessee | 2007 - |
| Pinnacle Pro Wrestling | Washington | 2005 – 2007 |
| Platinum Pro Wrestling | Indiana | 2009 |
| Pro-Wrestling World-1 | Pennsylvania | 2005 – 2007 |
| Pro Wrestling Zero1-Max | Japan | 2005 – December 2007 |
| Rocky Mountain Championship Wrestling | Colorado | January 2005 – 2008 |
| Spinebuster/World-1 South | Georgia | July 2005 – 2008 |
| Supreme Championship Wrestling | Indiana | 2005 – 2007 |
| Ultra Championship Wrestling-Zero | Utah | February 2005 – 2007 |
| West Coast Wrestling Connection | Oregon | 2007 – 2008 |
