= No Way Jose (wrestler) =

Dominican-American wrestler

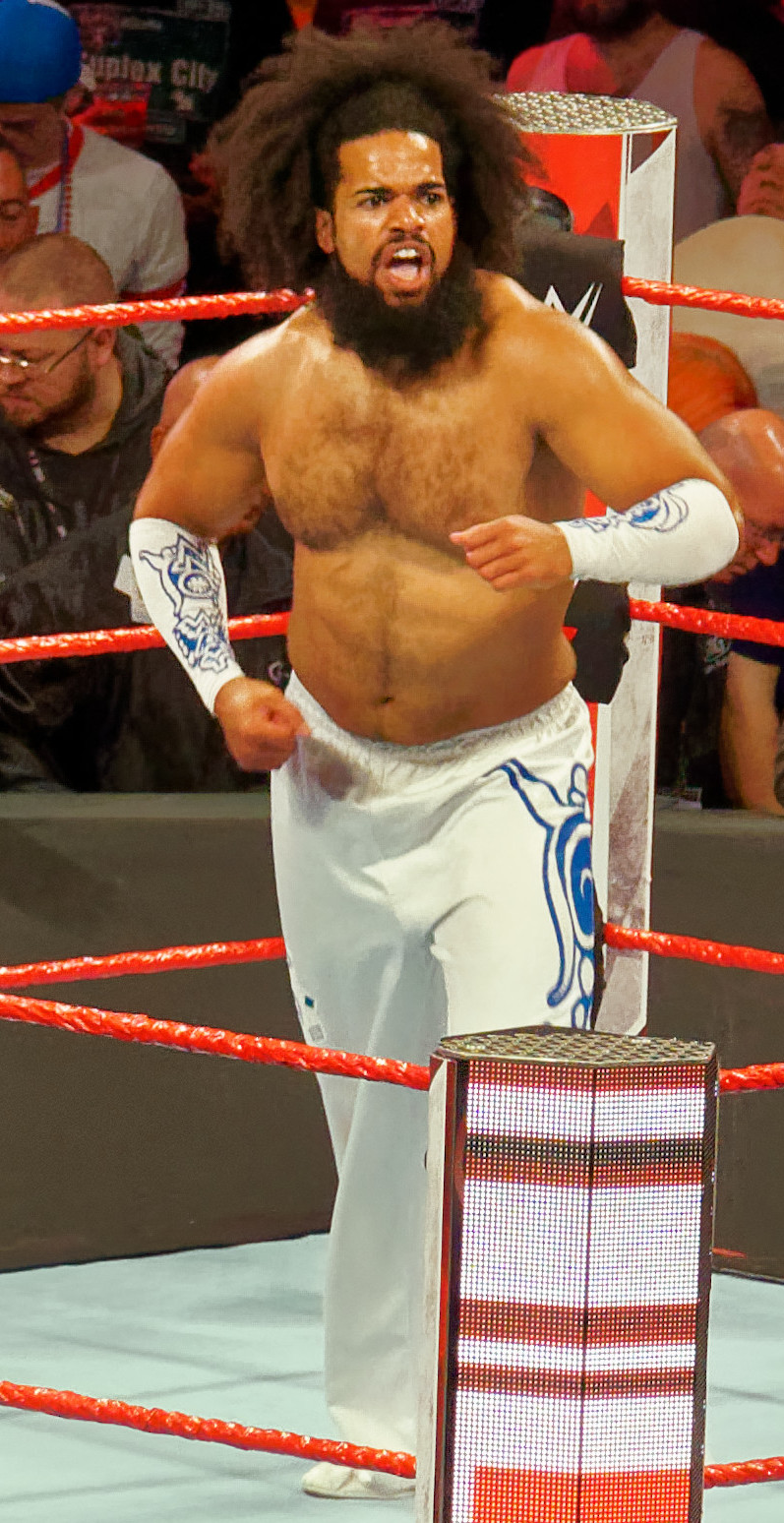
- Jose in 2018

Personal information
- Born: Levis Valenzuela Jr. May 30, 1988 (age 38) Durham, North Carolina, U.S.
- Children: 1

Professional wrestling career
- Ring name(s): Levy Valenz; Levis Valenzuela; Levis Valenzuela Jr. Manny Garcia; No Way; No Way Jose
- Billed height: 6 ft 3 in (191 cm)
- Billed weight: 245 lb (111 kg)
- Billed from: Santo Domingo, Dominican Republic
- Trained by: Roy Wilkins; Tony Racanelli; Cameron Grimes
- Debut: May 17, 2013

Levis Valenzuela Jr. (born May 30, 1988) is an American professional wrestler best known for his time with WWE under the ring name No Way Jose. Valenzuela debuted in May 2013, wrestling under the name Manny Garcia for North Carolina promotion CWF Mid-Atlantic, where he became a two-time CWF Mid-Atlantic Television Champion. He signed with WWE in 2015, wrestling in its developmental territory NXT before being called up to the main roster in April 2018. After being released by WWE in April 2020, he began to work on the independent circuit, as well with Impact Wrestling.

== Professional wrestling career ==
=== Independent circuit (2013–2015) ===
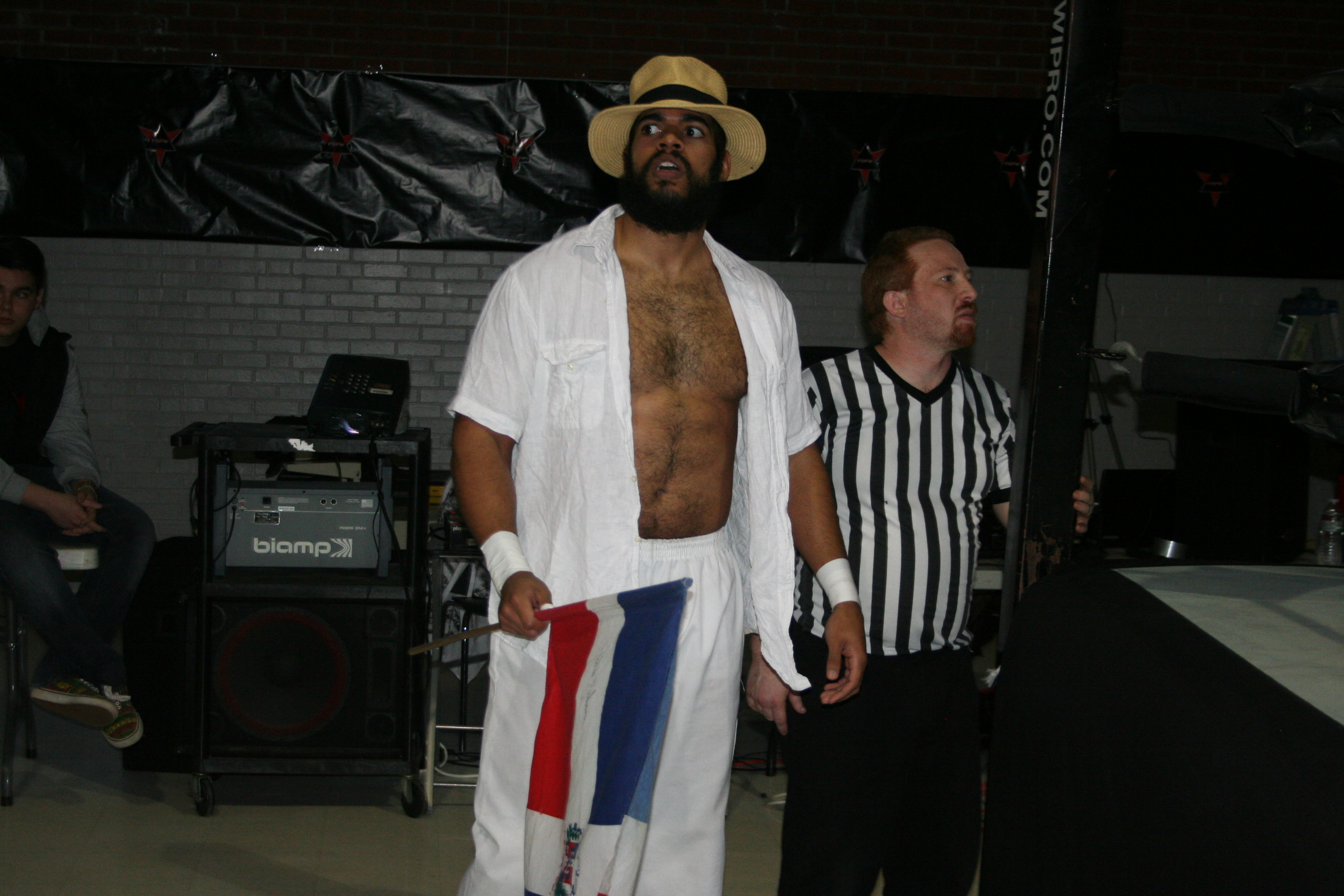
Garcia in 2014

Valenzuela made his debut in CWF Mid-Atlantic as Manny Garcia on May 17, 2013. Manny lost his debut match against Ric Converse. On May 3, 2014, he defeated Mark James to win the CWF Mid-Atlantic Television Championship. On December 6, 2014, Manny lost the title to Chris Lea. On December 27, 2014, Manny re-captured the TV Championship. On March 21, 2015, Manny lost his title in a Fatal 4 Way where Chet Sterling came out as victorious. In addition to CWF Mid-Atlantic, Garcia also appeared for promotions including Fire Star Pro Wrestling and OMEGA Championship Wrestling.

=== WWE ===
==== NXT (2015–2018) ====
In April 2015, it was reported that Valenzuela signed a contract with WWE. On April 10, 2015, Valenzuela was announced as one of 11 new signings to begin training at the WWE Performance Center. Wrestling under his real name, Valenzuela made his first appearance on NXT as an enhancement talent, teaming with Elias Samson in a tag team match, losing to American Alpha. Valenzuela then began to make frequent appearances at NXT house shows for the rest of 2015 and the early part of 2016.

In April 2016, vignettes began to air hyping the debut of Valenzuela, now repackaged as No Way Jose. He made his official debut on the April 20, 2016 episode of NXT, defeating Alexander Wolfe. On the June 22 episode of NXT, Jose interrupted Austin Aries during his interview backstage and told him to be positive following Aries' loss at NXT TakeOver: The End. Later that night, Jose defeated Josh Woods. Aries then came out and ended up dancing with Jose, but he then attacked Jose. After weeks of missing NXT, Jose attacked Aries after Aries' match on the July 20 episode of NXT. Jose rushed Aries outside into the locker room. Aries defeated Jose at NXT TakeOver: Brooklyn II.

Then, Jose entered a feud with Eric Young and the SAnitY faction by calling them out after they interrupted a match between Rich Swann and Kona Reeves. This led to an assault on Jose. On the November 30 episode of NXT, Jose faced Eric Young in a losing effort. On the December 7 episode of NXT, Jose and Rich Swann faced the team of Eric Young and Alexander Wolfe again in a losing effort. Jose continued to feud with SAnitY, forming an alliance with Tye Dillinger and Roderick Strong to battle the faction in early 2017. He was scheduled to team with Dillinger, Strong and Ruby Riot against SAnitY at NXT TakeOver: Orlando but he was attacked by Sanity before the show. He was replaced by Kassius Ohno in the match, which was eventually won by SAnitY.

==== Raw (2018–2020) ====
On the April 9 episode of Raw, the first after WrestleMania 34, Jose made his main roster debut, defeating local talent John Skyler in a squash match. Jose picked up an upset victory against Baron Corbin on the April 30 episode of Raw, after interference from Titus O'Neil. This would lead to Jose teaming with O'Neil and Apollo Crews to face Corbin and The Revival on the May 7 episode of Raw in a losing effort. He failed to qualify for the Men's Money in the Bank ladder match in a triple threat match against Corbin and the eventual winner Bobby Roode on the May 14 episode of Raw. On the May 21 episode of Raw, Jose was defeated by Corbin to end their feud. Jose then started a feud with Mojo Rawley. After losing to Rawley on the June 18 episode of Raw, Jose would ask for a rematch, only to be constantly denied one by Rawley for the next three weeks. Jose finally got his rematch on the July 9 episode of Raw, however he would once again be defeated by Rawley, thus ending the feud. Afterwards, Jose did not compete on Raw for four months, instead regularly appearing on Main Event. Jose returned to Raw on November 26, where he was defeated by Jinder Mahal.

Jose made his Royal Rumble debut at the namesake event on January 27, 2019, only to be eliminated in two seconds by Samoa Joe. Following this, Jose would be used sparingly on Raw until the April 13, 2020 episode of Raw where Jose was quickly defeated by Bobby Lashley in a squash match. This would be his final WWE appearance. On April 15, 2020, Jose was released from his contract along with various other superstars and backstage talent as part of budget cuts stemming from the COVID-19 pandemic.

=== Impact Wrestling (2020–2021) ===
Following his release from WWE, Valenzuela began taking bookings under the ring name Levy Valenz. On July 17, 2021, at Slammiversary, he made his debut for Impact Wrestling under the ring name No Way, being revealed as Fallah Bahh's mystery partner in the four-way tag team match for the Impact World Tag Team Championship, however, the match would ultimately be won by The Good Brothers (Doc Gallows and Karl Anderson). He stayed with Impact Wrestling until November 2021.

== Other media ==
Valenzuela made his WWE video game debut as a playable character in WWE 2K18, and subsequently appears in WWE 2K19 and lastly WWE 2K20.

== Personal life ==
Valenzuela has a son.

== Championships and accomplishments ==
- CWF Mid-Atlantic
  - CWF Mid-Atlantic Television Championship (2 times)
- Fire Star Pro Wrestling
  - FSPW South Eastern Championship (1 time)
- Pro Wrestling Illustrated
  - Ranked No. 200 of the top 500 singles wrestlers in the PWI 500 in 2018
- Wentworth Bros Entertainment
  - WBE World Championship (1 time, inaugural, current)
