= Quinson Valentino =

Canadian wrestler (born 1970)

Personal information
- Born: David Barry; June 2, 1970 (age 56) Chatham, New Brunswick, Canada
- Website: Official website

Professional wrestling career
- Ring name: Quinson Valentino
- Billed height: 6 ft 3 in (1.91 m)
- Billed weight: 235 lb (107 kg)
- Billed from: Beverly Hills, California
- Trained by: Ernie Moore; Steve Keirn; Tom Prichard
- Debut: July 4, 1999
- Retired: September 20, 2008

David Barry (born June 2, 1970) is a retired Canadian professional wrestler, trainer, and booker, best known by his ring name Quinson Valentino, who was a star on the independent circuit in eastern Canada and the Maritimes during the late 1990s and 2000s. He also formed successful tag teams with Jerry Martell, Derek St. Holmes, and Cody Deaner, and is widely considered to be one of Ontario's best "heel" performers.

In his career, Barry wrestled for various wrestling promotions: All World Wrestling League, Great Lakes Championship Wrestling, MainStream Wrestling Entertainment, Pure Wrestling Association, Rage Wrestling Entertainment, Rough Wrestling International, and World Class Canadian Wrestling. In the US, he has also made appearances for AWA Superstars, specifically AWA Brew City Wrestling in Wisconsin and AWA Mid-Atlantic in North Carolina, and the National Wrestling Alliance. He has also made brief guest appearances for World Wrestling Entertainment, in addition to a considerable number of other independent wrestling promotions in the Great Lakes region.

== Early life ==
David Barry was born in Chatham, New Brunswick. He was involved in physical contact sports at an early age, particularly martial arts, and started kickboxing at age 19. He had a total of 13 amateur fights and 4 professional fights before leaving the sport. Though he had an undefeated record, he later cited the negative attitude necessary to have when facing opponents was the major reason for giving up professional fighting.

I had to be a miserable prick when I got ready for a fight. It was a question of mental preparation and a question of time for the physical preparation. It is a very lonely process, and it really became a job instead of something that I loved doing, and I wasn't getting paid anywhere near enough to make it worthwhile.

— Dave Barry on his retirement from kickboxing

== Professional wrestling career ==
=== Early career in the Ontario independents ===
After giving up kickboxing, Barry turned to pro wrestling. He spent five months in the gym lifting weights and working on his conditioning before walking into a wrestling school. Barry originally trained under Ernie "The Executioner" Moore in Burlington, Ontario, but later studied with Steve Keirn and Tom Prichard in the United States. After eight months of training he made his pro debut July 4, 1999, at the Leander Boat Club in Hamilton. He and his opponent, Jerry Martell, later formed a tag team called the East West Connection 2K1.

It was in the Hamilton-based Empire Wrestling Federation where Barry made his debut as "Quinson Valentino", a cocky egotistical star from Beverly Hills, California. EWF promoter Bob Woods had planned a different "gimmick" for Barry, however, the young wrestler disliked the idea and improvised his own ring character on the fly. A childhood fan of Jesse Ventura, Ric Flair, Bruiser Brody, Rick Rude and Randy Savage, Barry incorporated some of their personalities and wrestling styles into his new in-ring persona. His finisher, for example, was a modified version of Rude's "Rude Awakening" neckbreaker. These creative differences, as well as a disagreement over the direction of his career, caused a real-life falling out between the two men and resulted in Barry leaving the promotion.

=== Great Lakes Championship Wrestling ===
Shortly after leaving the EWF, Barry joined Scott Chase's Great Lakes Championship Wrestling in Brantford, Ontario. He helped Chase as a booker during its first few months but decided to leave the position, around the time he won the promotion's heavyweight championship, so as not to create a bad atmosphere among the roster.

Barry won the GLCW Heavyweight Championship in late-2003 and spend the next several months feuding with the top babyface Scott Chase. Their feud extended to other Ontario-based promotions as well with Barry challenging Chase for the Canadian Grand Prix Wrestling heavyweight title in Cornwall on March 5, 2004. Another highlight in their feud occurred one week later when Barry teamed up with "The Real Deal" Magnus and "As Seen On TV" Notorious T.I.D. in a 6-man tag match to face Scott Chase, JQ Publik and "Mr. USA" Tony Atlas in Chase's hometown of Brantford. His time in GLCW established himself as one of the top heels on the Ontario independent circuit and was one of several GLCW stars to go to World Wrestling Entertainment.

=== Camp Martell ===
While working for GLCW, he and Jerry Martell, Flexx Falcone, Morgan Storm started "Camp Martell", a wrestling school associated with their home promotion. In August 2002, Barry was involved in a car accident with other members of Camp Martell. Though he himself was not injured, he was traveling in a second vehicle and witnessed the accident in his rear view mirror. Barry later helped the injured wrestlers, Flexx Falcone, DWK, and Luke Slater, get medical assistance in Moncton.

Barry and Falcone eventually took over the school after Martell and Morgan Storm decided to leave GLCW. It was later renamed the Wrestlecorps Pro Wrestling Academy and had the involvement of other Ontario independent wrestlers.

=== Elsewhere in Canada ===
Over the next two years Barry worked for various of independent promotions in Ontario and the Maritimes including Powerslam Wrestling Extreme, MainStream Wrestling, Canadian Independent Wrestling Alliance, and Canadian Professional Wrestling. He also received tryout matches with World Wrestling Entertainment appearing on the November 3rd edition of WWE Raw in Cleveland, Ohio, and November 6 edition of WWE Smackdown in Buffalo, New York. He later described his positive experience in the WWE locker room, including making a valuable connection with Hurricane Shane Helms, in interviews with SLAM! Sports and other Canadian websites.

In August 2003 Barry returned to the Maritimes where he headlined a live event for Canadian Pro Wrestling with Chi Chi Cruz, Scott Savage, Tony Armstrong, and The Highlanders (Robbie and Rory McAllister). Barry was one of several wrestlers who criticized the promotion for its overuse of backyard wrestlers.

=== Valentino in the United States ===
By the end of 2003, Barry began expanding beyond eastern Canada and into the United States making appearances in the All World Wrestling League (Michigan), Ultimate Championship Wrestling (Michigan), WOW Wrestling (Wisconsin), Cleveland All-Pro Wrestling (Ohio), World Wrestling Alliance (Indiana), World Wrestling Alliance (Massachusetts), and NWA East (Pennsylvania). His travels brought him as far as North Carolina where he competed for Southern Championship Wrestling and Alternative Championship Wrestling, winning the latter promotion's heavyweight title. He remained ACW Heavyweight Champion until the company merged with CWF Mid-Atlantic; he lost to CWF Mid-Atlantic Heavyweight Champion Ric Converse in a Triangle unification match, also involving Corey Edsel, in Seagrove, North Carolina, on January 31, 2004. Several months later at a television taping for "CWF Championship Wrestling", Barry lost to GeeStar in an intergender match, her first title defense as the first female CWF Mid-Atlantic Television Champion.

As several Canadian promotions often operated on a seasonal basis, Barry periodically returned to Ontario. In March, he toured with MainStream Wrestling Entertainment for its annual tour of the Maritimes. On May 18, he and The Missing Link wrestled to a double-disqualification at a show for the Canadian Independent Wrestling Alliance at Peterborough's Club Vibe. He also continued to wrestle for Pro Wrestling Xtreme at various times during the year.

Barry found early success in Michigan's All World Wrestling League. At a "Big Time Wrestling TV" television taping for Lansing's ABC53 Studios, he won the vacant AWWL Television Championship by defeating Thurston Brooks, Gutter, and Big Jake in a Fatal Four Way elimination match on August 23, 2004. On June 10, 2005, Barry defeated Ricky Stryc9 for the AWWL Heavyweight Championship at "War Games II" in Mason, Michigan. The match was not without controversy, however, as Barry was helped by outside interference from promoter Ed Farhat, Jr. and his henchman Medicine. He surrendered the television title at a subsequent show and defeated Ricky Stryc9 in a rematch at "War Games 4" in Ionia on August 12, 2005. Similarly, he enjoyed a championship reign in NWA All-Star Championship Wrestling winning the heavyweight title in a 2-day tournament; he eliminated TC Washington in the opening round, Silas Young in the semi-finals, and Mason Quinn in the finals to win the belt. He dropped it to J-Cash in Green Bay, Wisconsin, in September after four-month run. Earlier that year, Barry also participated in a special fundraiser, "Smackdown on Cancer", for Championship International Wrestling at Hillsdale High School in Hillsdale, Michigan.

That summer also saw Barry make a return to World Wrestling Entertainment. He first appeared in a backstage segment on WWE's Judgment Day pay-per-view where he was questioned by Booker T in a dressing room with Shannon Moore, Hardcore Holly, and Charlie Hass on the whereabouts of Kurt Angle. That same week, he wrestled at TV tapings for WWE RAW (May 23) and Smackdown! (May 24); Barry's Smackdown! opponent, Booker T (with Sharmell), pinned him following a scissors kick.

=== Return to Canada ===
Barry was also wrestling in Canada during this period. In the summer months, he worked shows for Pro Wrestling Xtreme and Chuck Simpson's Rough Wrestling International. On May 14, 2005, Barry lost to Elian Habanaro in a 3-way match also involving Eddie Osbourne at a Pro Wrestling Xtreme show in Goderich, Ontario. On October 23, 2005, Barry and Cody Deaner won the GLCW Tag Team Championship from Models Inc. (Flexx Falcone and Sean Spears) in Brantford, Ontario. The two continued to defend the belts until GLCW merged with Pure Wrestling Attitude in March 2006. Their last official title defense was at the March 12th "GLCW vs. PWA" show in Brantford where they defeated PWA Tag Team Champions Phil Latio and Pantalone in a unification match; due to a pre-match stipulation Latio was forced to retire. Their championship reign was brief, however, as they lost the belts to the South Side Stranglers (Southside Strangler #1 and #2) later on in the show. At a follow-up show, "The PWA/GLCW War", Barry wrestled L’Artiste who was widely believed to be the supposedly retired Phil Latio.

In the spring of 2006, Barry toured across Ontario with the Canadian Independent Wrestling Alliance, making stops in Brantford, Havelock, Oshawa, Peterborough, and Sault Ste. Marie. On June 3, he and "The Sniper" Randy Vahn defeated Blackjack Phoenix and Thorn in a non-title match for the AWA World Tag Team Championship at Eastdale High School in Welland, Ontario. It was originally supposed to be a title bout but Thorn's regular tag team partner was unable to make the event and Phoenix was substituted in his place.

That fall, he and several Canadian indy stars were present with "Mr. USA" Tony Atlas, Hacksaw Jim Duggan, and Koko B. Ware at a wrestling event held at the Pickering Markets on September 30-October 1. It was around this time that Barry returned to the States to join Daryk St. Holmes in AWA Brew City Wrestling as one-half of The Aristocrats (replacing Danny Scott). The team feuded with The Soul Shooters ("Poison" Appollo Starr and Drew "The Don" Johnson) over the BCW Tag Team Championship and eventually lost the belts to them in Waukesha, Wisconsin, the following year.

On December 9, 2006, he beat Reggie Marley at Mecca Pro Wrestling's "Holiday Holocaust" in Cornwall. A week later he participated in Rough Wrestling International's "The Clash for Christmas", a two-day charity event to benefit the victims of a major apartment fire the previous month. Barry wrestled RWI Heavyweight Champion The Quebec Mauler in the main event.

On January 6, 2007, Barry wrestled "Daytona Beach Bad Boy" Jason Cage at CWA Quebec's "New Year's Bashing" in Cornwall, Ontario. A week later, he defended the RWE Heavyweight Championship in a Triple Threat match against "MVP" Michael Von Payton and Drake Styles at the Carleton Place Arena. Though he briefly lost the title when it was declared vacant, Barry quickly regained the title from MVP at RWE's "Lost Aggression" on February 13. On March 3, he wrestled two matches in one night for New Wave Pro in Hamilton. He first wrestled a standard singles match against James Champagne and then a four-way match involving Kris Chambers, Cody 45, and Xtremo.

Barry spent the rest of the spring in Rage Wrestling Entertainment. At RWE's "Uprising" in Ottawa, he successfully defended the RWE Heavyweight title against Dave Titan. Later on in the show, however, he lost to Aftershock and Michael Von Payton in a tag team match with The Blackouts. A week later, he lost to Drake Styles in a non-title match at "Raising The Stakes" in Rockland, Ontario. As a result of his victory, Styles was granted a title shot at the promotion's next major event. His three-month championship reign was ended by Styles at "Unstoppable" on May 19. The two met in a handicap match, with Barry joined by Rahim Ali, and although his opponent was at a disadvantage Styles received unexpected help from Ali's valet Misty Haven allowing him to pin Ali.

On July 8, Barry wrestled Greg Valentine for the vacant CGPW Heavyweight Championship at a Canadian Grand Prix Wrestling event in Morrisburg, Ontario. Although billed as a 60-min. Iron Man match, their bout ended after 6 minutes. The following week, Barry appeared for The League's debut show, "Wrestlerock", in London, Ontario, where he defeated Norman Smiley. On August 24, he defended the RWI Heavyweight Championship against Chris Laplante at Rough Wrestling International's "Battle at the Beach 3" in Port Colborne. Barry granted Laplante one last title shot at an October 6 house show in Welland. He was challenged by Laplante, while a guest on "The President’s Court" with RWI President Matt Ayres, after making an insulting remark about Laplante's 100-year-old great-grandmother. President Ayers was also announced the special guest referee. In the main event later that night, LaPlante pinned Barry to win the title with the help of Sik Rik Matrix.

Towards the end of the year, Barry wrestled for the short-lived World Class Canadian Wrestling where he aligned himself with Club Carnage (Blackjack Phoenix, Lance Malibu, and manager Xavier Sterling). At its September 7 "Chaos At Crystal Ridge" show in Ridgeway, Ontario, he took part in a "Crystal Ridge Tornado Tag Team match" with Chris Laplante, Brodie Lee, and Lance Malibu. The winners were to wrestle each other to decide the number one contender for the WCCW North American Heavyweight Championship. Barry was originally scheduled to team with Lance Malibu but the teams were switched by WCCW CEO Schwartz. Malibu turned against Laplante during the tag match essentially giving Barry and Lee the victory. The wrestled each other later that night, with Barry being defeated by his former "partner". The title was vacated a short time afterwards and a championship tournament was held to crown a new champion. On November 2, Barry entered the one-night tournament defeating The Wyld Stallyon in the first round and Jimmy Jam Olsen in the finals to win the belt. The next month, Barry wrestled for a special RWI benefit show for the Salvation Army at Eastdale High School in Welland, Ontario. He wrestled Chris LaPlante for the RWI Heavyweight Championship but was anable to win back the title.

=== Final year on the independents ===
Barry spent the last year of his career in the Ontario independents. On January 12, 2008, he joined "Sniper" Randy Vahn and Krystal Banks in a 3-on-2 intergender handicap match against Chuck "The Butcher" Simpson and "Anti-Diva" Kaitlyn Diemond at an RWI show in Welland, Ontario, which Barry's team lost via disqualification. A week later, he entered Pro Wrestling Xtreme's "Woodstock Championship Tournament" in Woodstock, Ontario, and made it to the finals before being eliminated by Hayden Avery.

He also made a return to Michigan to team with Prince Erebus, Brother Cat Jackson, and Monster Ryot in an 8-man tag team match against AWWL Heavyweight Champion Harker Dirge, Blackjack Phoenix, The Unknown Commentator, and Cowabunga Dude for a March 1 TV taping in Saginaw, Michigan; according to the pre-match stipulations, the wrestler who scored the winning pinfall would win the championship. On April 6, Barry made a surprise appearance at IWA-Ontario All Pro's "Breaking the Barrier" in Oshawa, Ontario, as a "handpicked" opponent for Mike Stevens. Stevens' victory over Barry earned him the right to face Sex, Drugs and Wrestling (Ash and Kris Chambers) in the main event.

Later that month, Barry took part in MainStream Wrestling Entertainment's annual spring tour of the Maritimes, the largest such tour in the country. One of the highlights of the tour was Barry's match against the 7 ft., 300 lbs. MSW Heavyweight Champion Giant Grimez on April 25, at the War Memorial Community Centre in Windsor, and their rematch at the Digby Arena the following night.

For much of the year, Barry also wrestled shows for the Pure Wrestling Association, Ontario All Pro Wrestling and International Wrestling Entertainment. On August 9, he and Al Snow appeared for IWE's debut show at Hamilton Place's Studio Theatre, defeating both Scott Chase and H. C. Loc, as well as Chris Laplante on its second show the following month. On September 20, 2008, Barry wrestled his final match against Kryss Thorn for a RWI event in Welland. He had previously vowed to retire from wrestling had he lost to Thorn, which he did, and gave a farewell speech to the fans and fellow wrestlers afterwards.

Today is a day that comes with some very, very mixed emotions. I have spent the last 10 years of my life traveling the continent and entertaining thousands and thousands of fans. This privilege is unparalleled to anything I can possibly imagine. But today it has come to an end.

After years of living my dream, the age, the miles, and the injuries have told me that it is time to call it a career. I know in my heart that I can still perform but I would never allow myself to give you the fans anything less than the very best I have to offer. I love this business and I always want what is best for it and for you the fans. My wars have come to an end and I thank you from the bottom of my heart for sharing them with me.

There are so many people to thank and I have tried to highlight a few names in the scrolling box on the side of the screen. In truth it doesn't scratch the surface of all the people that helped forge this incredible journey. But it is my attempt to pinpoint some people who have significantly helped me over the years.

To my friends and family. Thank you for understanding, caring, worrying, and supporting me regardless of how stupid, stubborn, or senseless I was being.

To my brothers and sisters of the business. My bond with all of you will last forever. I entrusted you with my life and well being night after night. We have a bond and you can count on me whenever the call is made. Be very proud of your profession...you are warriors!

And finally to the fans...thank you for letting me entertain you. It has been the greatest privilege that I ever enjoyed. I gave you my sweat, my blood, and my tears...and you gave me so much more.

Good luck, be safe, and farewell.

— A statement released by Barry's website the day following his retirement

== Championships and accomplishments ==
- Alternative Championship Wrestling
  - ACW Heavyweight Championship (1 time)
- AWA Brew City Wrestling
  - AWA Brew City Wrestling Tag Team Championship (1 time) - with Derek St. Holmes
- All World Wrestling League
  - AWWL Heavyweight Championship (1 time)
  - AWWL Television Championship (1 time)
- Great Lakes Championship Wrestling
  - GLCW Heavyweight Championship (1 time)
  - GLCW Tag Team Championship (1 time)
- NWA All-Star Championship Wrestling / NWA Wisconsin
  - ACW/NWA Wisconsin Heavyweight Championship (1 time)
- Powerslam Wrestling Extreme
  - PWE Heavyweight Championship (3 times, first)
- Pro Wrestling Illustrated
  - PWI ranked him #385 of the top 500 singles wrestlers in the PWI 500 in 2005
- Pro Wrestling Weekly
  - Wrestler of the Week (January 14, 2001)
- Pure Wrestling Association
  - PWA Tag Team Championship (1 time) - with Cody Deaner
- Rage Wrestling Entertainment
  - RWE Heavyweight Championship (2 times)
- Rough Wrestling International
  - RWI Heavyweight Championship (1 time)
- World Class Canadian Wrestling
  - WCCW North American Heavyweight Championship (1 time, first)
- World Wrestling Alliance (Indiana)
  - WWA Heavyweight Championship (1 time)
