= CWF Mid-Atlantic Television Championship =

Professional wrestling championship

Details
- Promotion: CWF Mid-Atlantic
- Date established: 2000
- Date retired: December 31, 2019

Other name(s)
- CWF Cruiserweight Championship; FWA-Carolinas Cruiserweight Championship; AWA/CWF Mid-Atlantic Television Championship; CWF Mid-Atlantic Television Championship
Statistics
- First champion(s): Gemini Kid
- Final champion(s): Kool Jay
- Most reigns: Lee Valiant (3)
- Longest reign: Aric Andrews (483 days)
- Shortest reign: Kool Jay (3 days)

The CWF Mid-Atlantic Television Championship was a professional wrestling main championship in Carolina Wrestling Federation Mid-Atlantic (CWF Mid-Atlantic). It was the original cruiserweight title of the Carolina Wrestling Federation promotion, later used in the Frontier Wrestling Alliance (2001–2004) and AWA Superstars (2005–2007) as a regional title, officially representing the Mid-Atlantic United States, while it was a member of the respective governing bodies. It remained active until November 2003 when the CWF reclassified the title as a television championship.

The inaugural champion was The Gemini Kid, who was awarded the title in 2000 to become the first CWF Cruiserweight Champion. Lee Valiant holds the record for most reigns, with three. At 393 days, Mikael Yamaha's first reign is the longest in the title's history. Valiant's first reign was the shortest in the history of the title, lasting only seven days. Overall, there have been 47 reigns shared between 37 wrestlers, with one vacancy.

== Title history ==
Key
| No. | Overall reign number |
| Reign | Reign number for the specific champion |
| N/A | The information is not available or is unknown |

| No. | Champion | Championship change | | | Reign statistics | | Notes | Ref. |
| No. | Champion | Date | Event | Location | Reign | Days | Notes | Ref. |
|---|---|---|---|---|---|---|---|---|
| 1 | Gemini Kid | 2000 | CWF Mid-Atlantic | N/A | 1 | N/A | Gemini Kid is awarded the title to become the first CWF Heavyweight Champion. | |
| 2 | Mikael Yamaha | January 26, 2001 | CWF Mid-Atlantic | Wilson, NC | 1 | 393 | In February 2001, the title is renamed the FWA-Carolinas Cruiserweight Championship when CWF Mid-Atlantic became an official affiliate promotion for the Frontier Wrestling Alliance. | |
| 3 | Sexton Tyler | February 23, 2002 | Heartbreak | Graham, NC | 1 | 147 | | |
| 4 | Ric Converse | July 20, 2002 | Payback | Graham, NC | 1 | 231 | | |
| 5 | J-Money | March 8, 2003 | CWF Mid-Atlantic | Burlington, NC | 1 | 245 | This was the first-ever television episode of CWF Championship Wrestling. | |
| 6 | Xsiris | November 8, 2003 | CWF Mid-Atlantic | Burlington, NC | 1 | 161 | In November 2003, the title was renamed the FWA-Carolinas Television Championship. | |
| 7 | GeeStar | April 17, 2004 | CWF Mid-Atlantic | Burlington, NC | 1 | 70 | | |
| 8 | Mikael Yamaha | June 26, 2004 | CWF Mid-Atlantic | Burlington, NC | 2 | 196 | | |
| 9 | Jesse Ortega | January 8, 2005 | CWF Mid-Atlantic | Burlington, NC | 1 | 188 | | |
| 10 | Connor Mitch Connor | September 17, 2005 | CWF Mid-Atlantic | Burlington, NC | 1 | 112 | | |
| 11 | Rob McBride | January 7, 2006 | CWF Mid-Atlantic | Burlington, NC | 1 | 133 | | |
| 12 | Michael McAllister | May 20, 2006 | CWF Mid-Atlantic | Burlington, NC | 1 | 70 | | |
| 13 | Brass Munkey | July 29, 2006 | CWF Mid-Atlantic | Burlington, NC | 1 | 154 | | |
| 14 | Steve Greene | December 30, 2006 | Battlecade VII | Burlington, NC | 1 | 168 | | |
| 15 | Lee Valiant | June 16, 2007 | Absolute Justice | Burlington, NC | 1 | 7 | Valiant pinned Steve Greene in a 4-corner tag team match in which the title was on the line. | |
| 16 | Steve Greene | June 23, 2007 | Street Fight Challenge | Greensboro, NC | 2 | 329 | Steve Greene and AWA Mid Atlantic Heavyweight Champion Joey Silvia defeated the Neon Lions (Lee Valiant and Chris Collins) in a 3-way "Everything To Lose" tag team match also involving Fatback Enterprises (Donnie Dollar$ and Mitch Connor). Greene gained the pinfall over Valiant to win the championship. | |
| 17 | Tank Lawson | May 17, 2008 | Revelation | Burlington, NC | 1 | 112 | | |
| 18 | Marcellus King | September 6, 2008 | Sumner Civitans SuperBrawl III | Burlington, NC | 1 | 133 | | |
| 19 | Lee Valiant | January 17, 2009 | Night of Challenges | Burlington, NC | 2 | 273 | | |
| 20 | Joey Silva | October 17, 2009 | CWF Rumble | Burlington, NC | 1 | 77 | | |
| 21 | Lee Valiant | January 2, 2010 | Battlecade X | Burlington, NC | 3 | 14 | This was a No Disqualification match. | |
| | Vacated | January 16, 2010 | New Years Knockout! | Burlington, NC | — | — | The championship is vacated Lee Valiant is no longer able to defend the title due to a head injury. | |
| 22 | Roy Wilkins | February 6, 2010 | Title Turmoil | Burlington, NC | 1 | 133 | Wilkins defeated Arik Royal to win the vacant title after both were the last two remaining in a contender's battle royal. | |
| 23 | Arik Royal | June 19, 2010 | Absolute Justice IV | Burlington, NC | 1 | 182 | | |
| 24 | Ray Kandrack | December 18, 2010 | Battlecade XI | Burlington, NC | 1 | 362 | | |
| 25 | Steve Greene | June 4, 2011 | CWF Mid-Atlantic Title Turmoil | Burlington, NC | 2 | 14 | | |
| 26 | Ray Kandrack | June 18, 2011 | Absolute Justice 5 | Burlington, NC | 2 | 182 | | |
| 27 | Donnie Dollar$ | December 15, 2011 | Battlecade 12! | Burlington, NC | 1 | 282 | | |
| 28 | Trevor Lee | September 22, 2012 | Converse vs. King | Gibsonville, NC | 1 | 252 | | |
| 29 | Matty de Nero | January 6, 2013 | Can't Hardly Wait | Gibsonville, NC | 1 | 140 | | |
| 30 | Chase Dakota | October 19, 2013 | Fallout | Gibsonville, NC | 1 | 145 | | |
| 31 | Mark James | March 13, 2014 | CWF Mid-Atlantic | Gibsonville, NC | 1 | 51 | | |
| 32 | Manny Garcia | May 3, 2014 | Explosive Elements | Gibsonville, NC | 1 | 217 | | |
| 33 | Chris Lea | December 6, 2014 | Road To Battlecade XV | Gibsonville, NC | 1 | 21 | | |
| 34 | Manny Garcia | December 27, 2014 | Battlecade XV | Gibsonville, NC | 2 | 84 | | |
| 35 | Chet Sterling | March 21, 2015 | Madness In Any Direction | Gibsonville, NC | 1 | 231 | Sterling and Trevor Lee defeated Manny Garcia and Ethan Sharpe. Sterling and Lee's CWF Mid-Atlantic Tag Team Championship was also on the line. | |
| 36 | Cedric Alexander | November 7, 2015 | Fallout | Gibsonville, NC | 1 | 49 | | |
| 37 | Smith Garrett | December 26, 2015 | Battlecade XVI | Gibsonville, NC | 1 | 175 | | |
| 38 | Aric Andrews | June 18, 2016 | Absolute Justice | Gibsonville, NC | 1 | 483 | This was a three-way dance, which also involving Chet Sterling. | |
| 39 | Jesse Adler | October 14, 2017 | 17th Anual Rumble | Gibsonville, NC | 1 | 77 | | |
| 40 | Arik Royal | December 30, 2017 | Battlecade X8 | Gibsonville, NC | 2 | 14 | | |
| 41 | Shane Helms | January 13, 2018 | New Year's Knockout | Gibsonville, NC | 1 | 119 | | |
| 42 | Aric Andrews | May 12, 2018 | Our House | Gibsonville, NC | 2 | 175 | | |
| 43 | Trevor Lee | June 30, 2018 | Freedom of Expression | Gibsonville, NC | 2 | 126 | | |
| 44 | Otto Schwanz | November 3, 2018 | Invincible | Gibsonville, NC | 1 | 56 | | |
| 45 | Aaron Biggs | December 29, 2018 | Battlecade XIX | Gibsonville, NC | 1 | 266 | | |
| 46 | Ethan Alexander Sharpe | September 21, 2019 | Gold Rush | Gibsonville, NC | 1 | 98 | | |
| 47 | Kool Jay | December 28, 2019 | Invincible | Burlington, NC | 1 | 3 | | |
| | Retired | December 31, 2019 | N/A | N/A | | | | |

== Combined reigns ==
| Rank | Wrestler | Reigns | Combined days |
|---|---|---|---|
| 1 | Mikael Yamaha | 2 | 589 |
| 2 | Ray Kandrack | 2 | 544 |
| 3 | Aric Andrews | 2 | 532 |
| 4 | Steve Greene | 3 | 511 |
| 5 | Trevor Lee | 2 | 378 |
| 6 | Manny Garcia | 2 | 301 |
| 7 | Lee Valiant | 3 | 293 |
| 8 | Donnie Dollars | 1 | 280 |
| 9 | Aaron Biggs | 1 | 266 |
| 10 | Jesse Ortega | 1 | 252 |
| 11 | J-Money | 1 | 245 |
| 12 | Chet Sterling | 1 | 231 |
| 12 | Ric Converse | 1 | 231 |
| 14 | Arik Royal | 1 | 196 |
| 15 | Smith Garrett | 1 | 175 |
| 16 | Xsiris | 1 | 161 |
| 17 | Brass Munkey | 1 | 154 |
| 18 | Sexton Tyler | 1 | 147 |
| 18 | Chase Dakota | 1 | 147 |
| 20 | Matty de Nero | 1 | 140 |
| 21 | Rob McBride | 1 | 133 |
| 21 | Marcellus King | 1 | 133 |
| 23 | Roy Wilkins | 1 | 132 |
| 24 | Shane Helms | 1 | 119 |
| 25 | Mitch Connor | 1 | 112 |
| 25 | Tank Lawson | 1 | 112 |
| 27 | Ethan Alexander Sharpe | 1 | 98 |
| 28 | Joey Silvia | 1 | 78 |
| 29 | Jesse Adler | 1 | 77 |
| 30 | GeeStar | 1 | 70 |
| 30 | Michael McAllister | 1 | 70 |
| 32 | Otto Schwanz | 1 | 56 |
| 33 | Cedric Alexander | 1 | 49 |
| 33 | Mark James | 1 | 49 |
| 35 | Gemini Kid | 1 | 1 - 26 |
| 36 | Chris Lea | 1 | 21 |
| 37 | Kool Jay | 1 | 3 |
