= Francis Marion Smith House =

Historic house in North Carolina, United States

- U.S. National Register of Historic Places
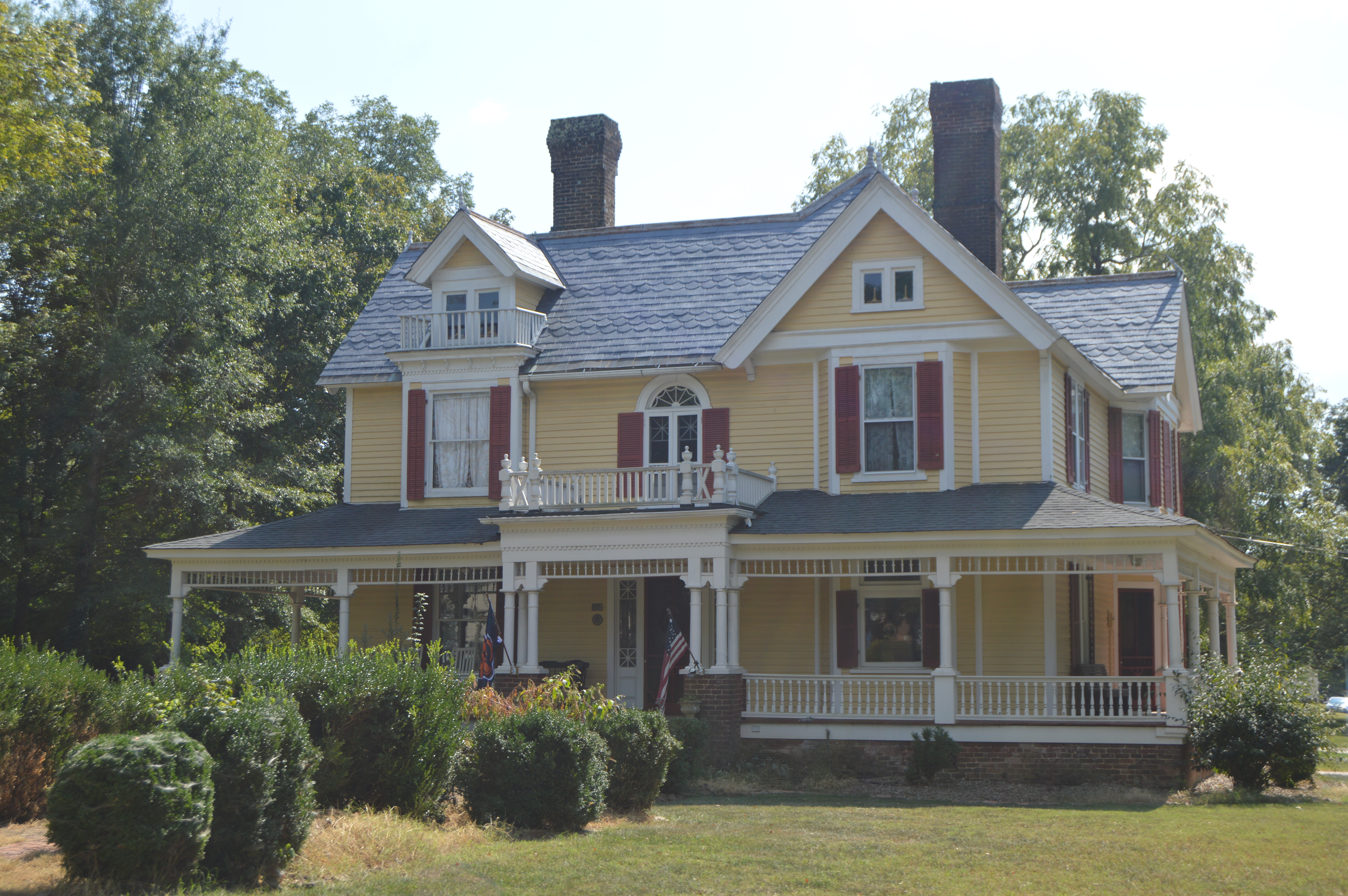
- Facade

- Location within North Carolina Location within the United States
- Location: 204 Railroad Ave., Gibsonville, North Carolina
- Coordinates: 36°6′15″N 79°32′28″W
- Area: 1.3 acres (0.53 ha)
- Built: 1898
- Architectural style: Colonial Revival, Queen Anne
- NRHP reference No.: 84002330
- Added to NRHP: July 12, 1984

Francis Marion Smith House is a historic home located at Gibsonville, Guilford County, North Carolina.

== History ==
It was built in 1898, and consists of a 2/2-story, double-pile main block with a one-story rear kitchen ell. The house incorporates Queen Anne and Colonial Revival style design elements. It has a high hipped roof, tall chimneys with boldly corbeled caps, and a full with front porch with Tuscan order columns. Also on the property are the contributing well house and smokehouse.

It was listed on the National Register of Historic Places in 1984.
