= Gibsonville School =

Historic school building in North Carolina, United States

- U.S. National Register of Historic Places
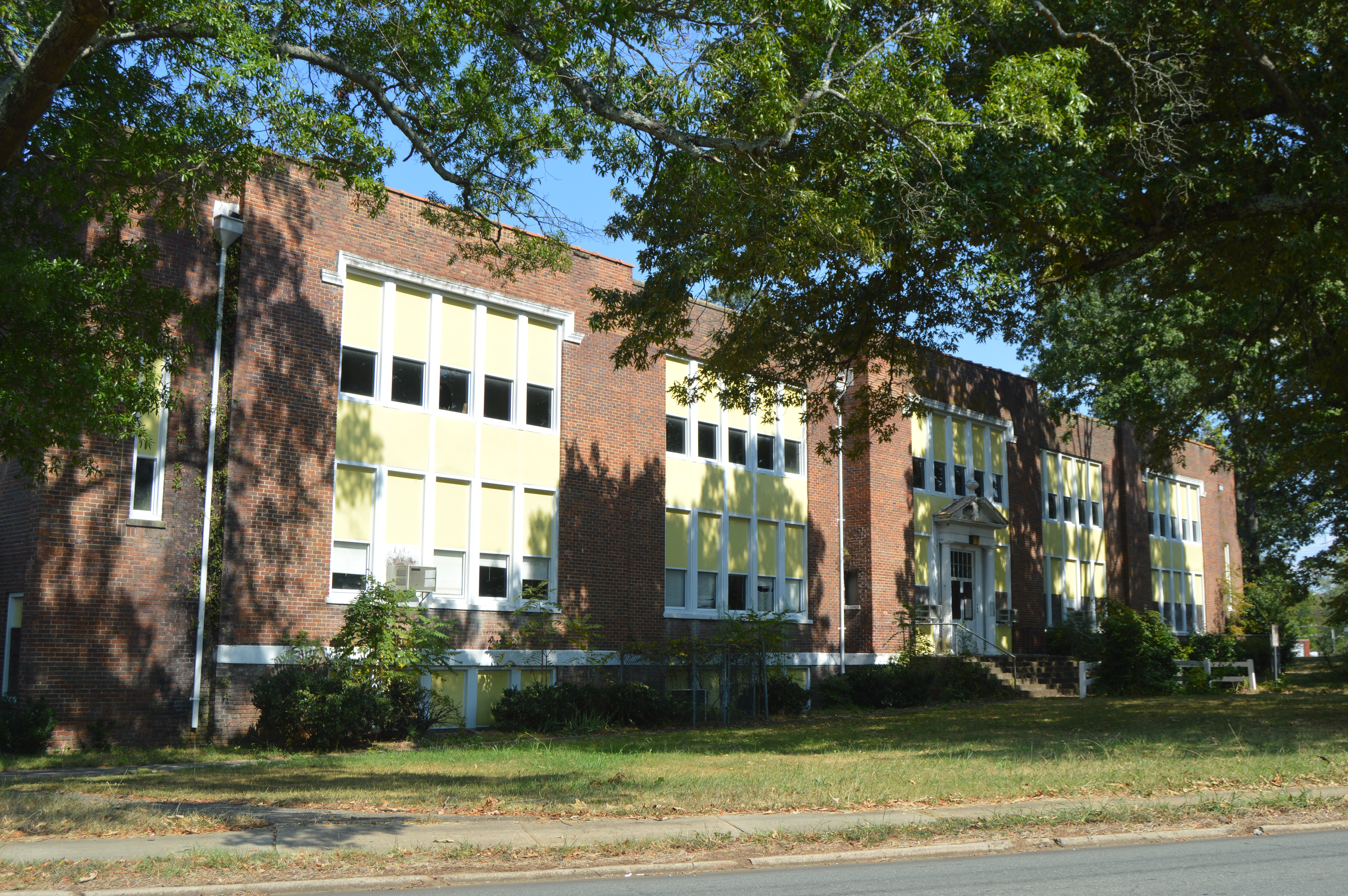
- Facade

- Location within North Carolina Location within the United States
- Location: 500 Church St., Gibsonville, North Carolina
- Coordinates: 36°6′36″N 79°32′39″W
- Area: 5 acres (2.0 ha)
- Built: 1924, 1937, 1951
- Built by: Gustav Larsen
- Architect: Herbert B. Hunter
- Architectural style: Colonial Revival
- NRHP reference No.: 14000495
- Added to NRHP: August 18, 2014

Gibsonville School is a historic school building located at Gibsonville, Guilford County, North Carolina. It was built in 1924, and is a two-story, seven-bay, rectangular brick building with a Colonial Revival-style entrance. It has a "U"-shape plan with parallel projecting 1930s rear wings. Also on the property are the contributing 1937 home economics building (now the Gibsonville Public Library) and a 1951 gymnasium.

It was listed on the National Register of Historic Places in 2014.
