= John Wagoner =

American gridiron football player (1923–2017)

Profile
- Positions: Guard, Tackle

Personal information
- Born: June 7, 1923; Gibsonville, North Carolina, U.S.
- Died: February 6, 2017 (aged 93); Gibsonville, North Carolina, U.S.
- Listed height: 6 ft 0 in (1.83 m)
- Listed weight: 210 lb (95 kg)

Career information
- College: North Carolina State

Career history
- 1948–1953: Ottawa Rough Riders
- 1954: BC Lions

Awards and highlights
- Grey Cup champion (1951)

John Bryan Wagoner (June 7, 1923 – February 6, 2017) was an American professional football player who played for the Ottawa Rough Riders and BC Lions. He won the Grey Cup with Ottawa in 1951. He previously attended and played football at North Carolina State University.
