= Simeon Wagoner House =

Historic house in North Carolina, United States

- U.S. National Register of Historic Places
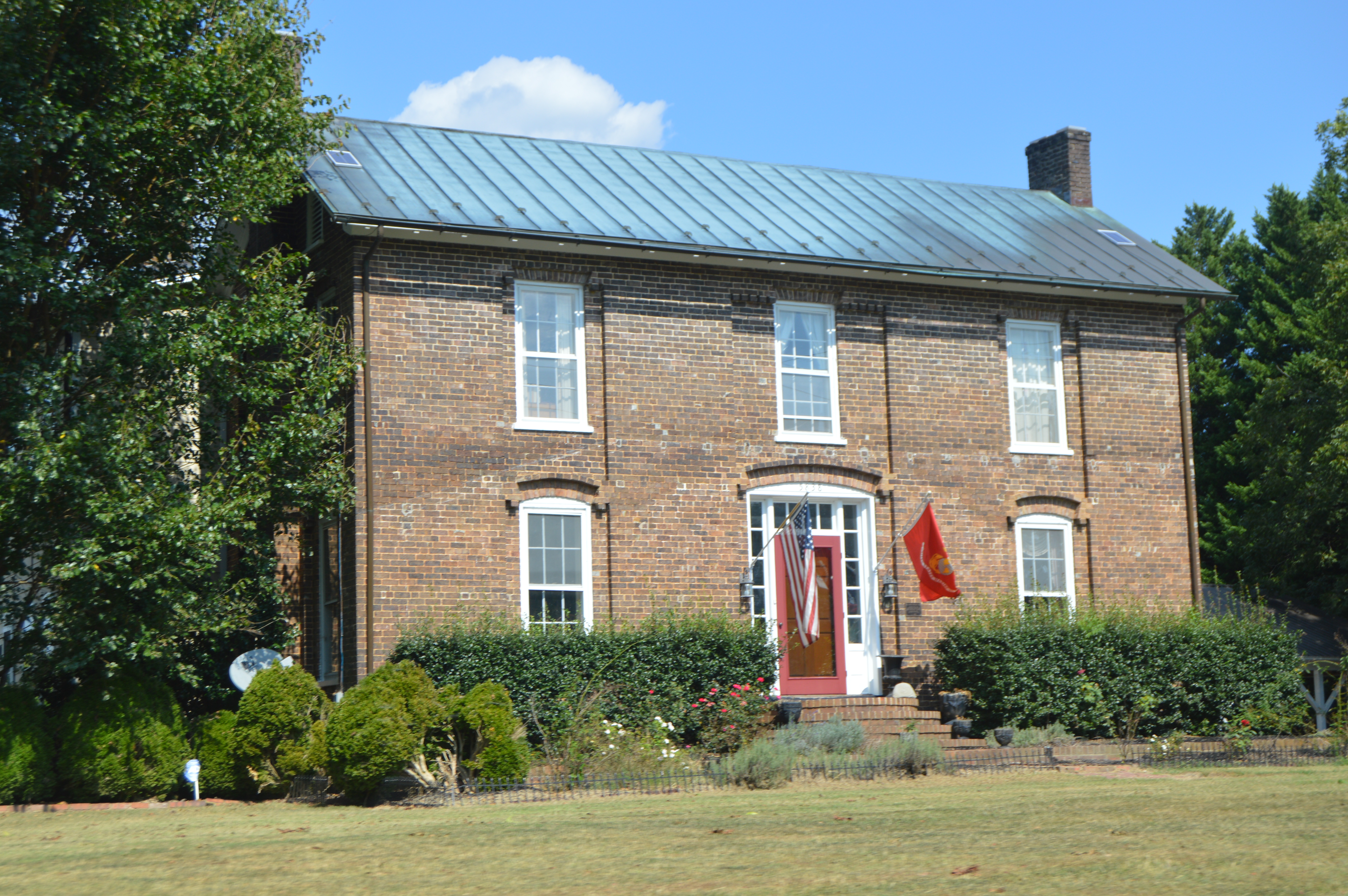
- Facade

- Location within North Carolina Location within the United States
- Location: 5838 NC 61 (Friedens Church Rd.), near Gibsonville, North Carolina
- Coordinates: 36°7′31″N 79°33′31″W
- Area: 2.9 acres (1.2 ha)
- Built: 1861
- Architectural style: Italianate, Greek Revival
- NRHP reference No.: 91001172
- Added to NRHP: September 3, 1991

Simeon Wagoner House is a historic home located near Gibsonville, Guilford County, North Carolina. It was built in 1861, and is a two-story, three-bay, single-pile, Italianate-style brick dwelling. It has distinctive recessed panels and corbelling, a two-story rear ell, and Greek Revival-style interior. Also on the property is the contributing hip-roofed, brick dairy.

It was listed on the National Register of Historic Places in 1991.
