= Sean Evans (wrestler) =

American professional wrestler (1971–2007)

Personal information
- Born: Sean Charles Evans; January 28, 1971 McKeesport, Pennsylvania, United States
- Died: October 2, 2007 (aged 36) United States

Professional wrestling career
- Ring name(s): Sean Evans; Halo; Shocker Sean Evans
- Debut: 1993
- Retired: 2005

Sean Charles Evans (January 28, 1971 – October 2, 2007) was an American professional wrestler, known by his ring name Shocker Sean Evans, who co-founded and worked for Pro Wrestling eXpress, NWA Wildside, World Wrestling Entertainment and American independent promotions.

== Career ==
Evans began his professional wrestling career in 1993 and in 1994 founded the Pennsylvania independent promotion Pro Wrestling eXpress with Jim Miller. Evans was the promotion's heavyweight champion in 1998.

Evans for the WWE from 2001 to 2003 having matches against Crash Holly, Essa Rios, Matt Hardy and Val Venis. At Vengeance 2003 when he worked as the Easter Bunny during "The APA Invitational Barroom Brawl.

In 2004, Evans worked for NWA Wildside. He also worked for Georgia Championship Wrestling.

Evans made a return to WWE in early 2005 losing to Heidenreich (twice) and Chris Masters. Later that year he retired from wrestling.

== Death ==
Evans was diagnosed with lung cancer in the spring of 2006. Lita helped headline a benefit on September 14, 2006, in Atlanta to assist with his medical bills and create awareness for cancer. Lex Luger, Raven and Buff Bagwell attended the event.

Evans died on October 2, 2007, at 36.

Pro Wrestling eXpress (PWX) the promotion that Evans co-founded held annual memorial tournaments from 2008 to 2016.

In 2008, Evans was inducted in PWX's Hall of Fame.

== Championships and accomplishments ==
- Pro Wrestling eXpress
  - PWX Heavyweight Championship (2 times)
  - PWX Television Championship (1 time)
  - PWX Tag Team Championship (1 time)
