= Pro Wrestling eXpress =

Professional wrestling promotion

Xpress Wrestling
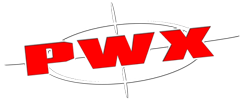
- Acronym: PWX
- Founded: 1994
- Defunct: 2025
- Style: American wrestling
- Headquarters: McKeesport, Pennsylvania, U.S.
- Founder(s): Jim Miller; Sean Evans; Mark Wilhelm
- Owner(s): Jim Miller (1994–2025); Sean Evans (1994–2007)
- Parent: National Wrestling Alliance (1997–2012); Allied Independent Wrestling Federations (2014–2016)
- Formerly: NWA East; Atlas Wrestling Company; Pittsburgh Wrestling League

Xpress Wrestling (formerly known as Pro Wrestling eXpress (PWX), also known as NWA East) was a professional wrestling promotion that was founded in North Versailles, Pennsylvania in 1994 by Jim Miller and Sean "Shocker" Evans. It was the longest-running promotion in the Pittsburgh metropolitan area before its folding in 2025. PWX was the main rival of Steel City Wrestling during the 1990s and was an affiliate of the National Wrestling Alliance from 1997 to 2012. PWX held a prominent role in the organization during this period. It was part in the annual NWA Anniversary Shows from 1998 to 2000 and brought national and world NWA champions to audiences in the East Coast of the United States. The promotion also collaborated with non-NWA members on the local independent circuit holding several interpromotional shows with Chris Lash's Allied Powers Wrestling Federation (2002; 2009–2010) and participated in Deaf Wrestlefest (2010).

== History ==
=== Early history ===
An early PWX banner with the promotion's original logo.

Pro Wrestling eXpress was established by Jim Miller and Sean "Shocker" Evans in 1994. A wrestling school, the PWX Academy, was subsequently opened at the Eastland Mall with B.A. Briggs and Jimmy Valiant as head trainers. PWX also had a weekly late-night television show that aired on WPTT. The first events were held in October and November 1995. The first PWX Heavyweight Champion, B.A. Briggs, won the championship in a tournament held on October 21, 1995, in North Versailles, Pennsylvania. The first PWX Tag Team Champions were crowned in a tournament final on January 8, 1996, in North Versailles, when Sean Evans and Vince Charming defeated Brian Anthony and Paul Atlas. PWX was also one of several East Coast promotions to feature talent from Extreme Championship Wrestling. On December 13, 1996, Blue World Order members Stevie Richards and The Blue Meanie won the PWX Tag Team Championship.

=== Rivalry with Steel City Wrestling ===
In late 1997, PWX television announcers Norm Connors and Andrew Lazarchik began holding their own wrestling events in the Pittsburgh metropolitan area under the Steel City Wrestling banner. On September 21, 1997, an interpromotional PWX-SCW show was held at Pittsburgh's Sullivan Hall. Connors and Lazarchik left the company at the end of the year, due to creative differences with PWX management, and began directly running against PWX. This led to a near three-year rivalry that lasted until SCW's close in the spring of 2000.

=== Joining the National Wrestling Alliance ===
Around this time, PWX joined the National Wrestling Alliance as NWA East. On October 24, 1998, T. Rantula represented the promotion at the NWA 50th Anniversary Show in Cherry Hill, New Jersey, where he wrestled Abdullah the Butcher. Several NWA East / PWX wrestlers also took part in the NWA 51st Anniversary Show in Charlotte, North Carolina. Brian Anthony wrestled Naoya Ogawa (Universal Fighting-Arts Organization) and Gary Steele (NWA UK Hammerlock) in a Triangle match for the NWA World Heavyweight Championship. Vince Kaplack represented PWX in the "Free For All" battle royal to be named number one contender for the NWA World Junior Heavyweight Championship. NWA East / PWX's The Rage (Samu and Quinn Magnum) battled The Canadian Cartel ("Gorgeous" Michelle Starr and Crusher Carlsen), representing NWA Canada, to a no-contest. This was a semi-final tournament match to determine the top contenders for NWA World Tag Team Championship. A tournament final for the then vacant PWX Tag Team Championship was held at the NWA 52nd Anniversary Show in Nashville, Tennessee which saw Paul Atlas and Jimmy Angel beat Rage to become the new champions.

At one point, PWX was one of three groups under the umbrella of NWA East along with the Pittsburgh Wrestling League and World Legion Wrestling. It was eventually decided to consolidate all three groups into a single company. On June 22–23, 2001, PWX vacated all its championships to create four new titles as part of NWA East. Paul Atlas became the NWA East Triple Jeopardy Champion after defeating Jimmy Angel, Kid Cupid, Kid Ego and Scott Venom. Crusher Hansen defeated J.B. Destiny and Dean Jablonski in a three-way match for the NWA East Three Rivers Championship. The Mon Valley Monsters (Cory K and Big Poppa Gator) beat Armageddon (Rapture and Revelation) in a tournament final to unify the NWA East, Pittsburgh Wrestling League and Pro Wrestling eXpress Tag Team Championships to form the new NWA Pro Wrestling eXpress Tag Team Championship. Brandon K also defeated Dirk Ciglar in a tournament final to unify the NWA East, PWL and PWX Heavyweight titles into the newly formed NWA East Triple Crown Heavyweight Championship. On December 15, 2001, NWA East / PWX hosted the 2001 NWA Clash of the Champions at the McKeesport Sportatorium in which Shinya Hashimoto defeated Steve Corino and Gary Steele in a three-way round-robin "Iron Man" match to capture the then vacant NWA World Heavyweight Championship. After the match, Hashimoto was attacked by a masked wrestler to was revealed to be former NWA world champion Dan Severn. Naohiro Hoshikawa also made his U.S. debut at the event unsuccessfully challenging NWA East Triple Jeopardy Champion Paul Atlas in a Triple Threat match with Nikita Allanov.

In February 2002, NWA East / PWX co-held the Best of the Best Tournament with NWA Tri-State in Titusville, Pennsylvania. Also on the show, Larry Zbyszko defeated Fabulous Frederick, Vito LoGrasso beat NWA Tri-State Champion Magnum in a non-title match, and Rocky Reynolds defeated Jason Rumble to win the NWA World Junior Heavyweight Championship. NWA East hosted a "champion vs. champion" match between NWA East Heavyweight Champion Nikita Allanov and NWA National Heavyweight Champion Ricky Murdock the following year as well as bringing in talent from NWA New Jersey and NWA Virginia.

=== Relationship with the Allied Powers Wrestling Federation ===
NWA East / PXW had a close working relationship with the Allied Powers Wrestling Federation based in Commodore, Pennsylvania. The two promotions co-hosted several interpromotional shows together from 2002 to 2010. These early shows had the two companies sharing talent, however, a storyline developed which saw relations between APWF and NWA East become confrontational. A showdown of sorts took place at the McKeesport Sportatorium on July 5, 2002, pitting APWF and NWA East wrestlers against each other. According to the pre-match stipulations, the APWF would receive the contracts of NWA East wrestlers if they won the majority of the matches. If the NWA East wrestlers won the majority, APWF wrestlers would be banned from their shows. Bubba Brewer (APWF) defeated Crusher Hansen (NWA East) in the first bout while Spiffy Sean Stylez (NWA East) won the second bout against Kidd Country (APWF) via disqualification. In the final bout, Jimmy Vega$ and Dr. Feelgood (APWF) beat Dirk Ciglar and Brandon K (NWA East) to win the NWA East contracts for the APWF. The APWF-NWA East war continued throughout the summer. The APWF "invasion" came to an end in McKeesport on August 2, 2002, when J.B. Destiny and Sean Stylez defeated Kid Country and Charlie Mansun. APWF promoter Chris Lash was forced to leave the National Wrestling Alliance as a result.

=== Notable talent ===
NWA East / PWX featured a number of wrestlers who were regulars in the East Coast wrestling scene and was the birthplace of Crusher Hanson and Michael Tarver. Like its longtime rival SCW, the promotion regularly featured Pittsburgh "legends" such as Lord Zoltan and T. Rantula as well as many regional "indy stars" such as Bubba the Bulldog, Dennis Gregory, The Hungarian Barbarian, Lou Marconi, Frank Stalletto, Tom Brandi, Darren Wyse and Samu. It also showcased younger up and coming wrestlers including, most notably, Amazing Red, Cody Hawk, Kingdom James, Gregory Iron, Matthew Justice, Ryan Mitchell, Michael Shane, Quinson Valentino, Shark Boy, Sterling James Keenan, Xavier, and The S.A.T. (Jose Maximo and Joel Maximo). Bobby Shields, a former NWA East / PWX Three Rivers Champion, participated in East Coast Wrestling Association's 15th annual Super 8 tournament. Female wrestlers Tessa Blanchard and Stacy Hunter have both had notable roles in the company.

The promotion also featured talent from Extreme Championship Wrestling. Blue World Order members Stevie Richards and The Blue Meanie are former PWX Tag Team Champions. Shane Douglas held the PWX Heavyweight Championship in the summer of 1999. In addition to showcasing national and world NWA champions, Robert Gibson, Larry Zbyszko and other NWA legends have made special guest appearances during the 2000s.

Jon Burton, a sportscaster for SportsRadio 93.7, was recruited by NWA East / PWX promoter Jim Miller to become a "heel" wrestler for the promotion. Burton initially entered pro wrestling for a one-time wrestling match against fellow radio broadcaster Bubba the Bulldog of B94. He won the NWA East / PWX Brass Knuckles Championship twice while competing for the company.

=== PWX Wrestleplex and television syndication ===
"When we first went down, when they first got this building, it was a school. You know, like an elementary school. And we went down and they unhooked, like [the doors] had been chained shut, and they broke the bolt on it and unchained it. And I'm thinking 'We're gonna' find, you know, the body of a drug addict in here! What is this?'. And the ceilings needed to be torn out. The whole place needed to be gutted. And they have really, and not just Jim and Quinn, but all the wrestlers, trainees, and volunteers, and other people who really went in there and [...] have turned it into a great little arena. Its got great lighting, and its got a stage, and it's also a great training venue where we have a chance to now train new students and train the next generation."

— In an April 2015 interview, Chris LeRusso discusses the PWX Wrestleplex

NWA East / PWX held the majority of its shows at the PWX Wrestleplex, located at the Eastland Mall, in North Versailles, Pennsylvania. The promotion moved its events from Eastland Mall, which was demolished in 2005, to the Jacob Woll Pavilion in Renziehausen Park during the mid-2000s. It also held events at The Sportatorium and The Palisades in McKeesport, Pennsylvania. In August 2011, the promotion relocated to McKeesport and established a new home venue, what was dubbed "The New PWX Wrestleplex", at the former St. Stephen's Church fellowship hall and school. The property was in such poor condition that it was necessary for a group of wrestlers, students and other volunteers to do a complete tear out and renovation. The move was officially announced on September 24 at what would be the final show at Jacob Woll Pavilion in Renzie Park. In the main event, NWA North American Tag Team Champions Team MEGA (JR Mega and Ashton Amhurst) successfully defended the title against Patrick Hayes and then PWX Heavyweight Champion Stryder. This was the last NWA East / PWX event in which an NWA championship was contested. On October 29, 2011, the New PWX Wrestleplex was opened to the public. The PWX 17th Anniversary Show featured the return of many alumni and included T. Rantula's induction into the PWX Circle of Respect.

In February 2013, Channel 22 began broadcasting PWX Steel City TV on Saturday mornings. The promotion originally had a late-night television show on WPTT during the late 1990s but had been off local television during the previous decade. PWX Steel City TV was syndicated to Channel 26 in mid-Mon Valley and Channel 56 in Westmoreland County reaching a potential audience of 400,000 viewers. Live shows were filmed at "The New PWX Wrestleplex" using a four-camera setup and a green screen for special features. PXW programming was shown in Western Pennsylvania and parts of Ohio and West Virginia on a total of 12 over-the-air television stations. As of 2015, it is also available online via Roku and Vimeo.

=== Recent years ===
On May 2, 2010, NWA East / PWX took part in Deaf Wrestlefest, an annual benefit show for the Western Pennsylvania School for the Deaf, with Patrick Hayes successfully defending his heavyweight title against Ashton Amherst. Amherst, a longtime NWA East / PWX "heel" wrestler, served as the main antagonist in the 2013 comedy horror film Pro Wrestlers vs Zombies. On November 30, 2014, Samu was inducted into the Circle of Respect at PWX's 20th Anniversary Show. Samu wrestled his last-ever match in PWX the following year when he and his son Lance Anoa'i joined Quinn Magnum in a six-man tag team match against Payton Graham, Jack Pollock and Stryder.

In March 2015, the PWX Wrestling Academy was featured in the Pittsburgh Tribune-Review. PWX wrestler Crusher Hanson was profiled by Pittsburgh Post-Gazette a month later. In June 2016, PWX joined Global Force Wrestling and the Renegade Wrestling Alliance for a benefit show at Lackawanna College. Two months later, CBS Pittsburgh named PWX among the best locally based independent promotions along with the Keystone State Wrestling Alliance, International Wrestling Cartel, and Ring of Honor.

Xpress Wrestling folded in June 2025.

== Roster ==
Male wrestlers

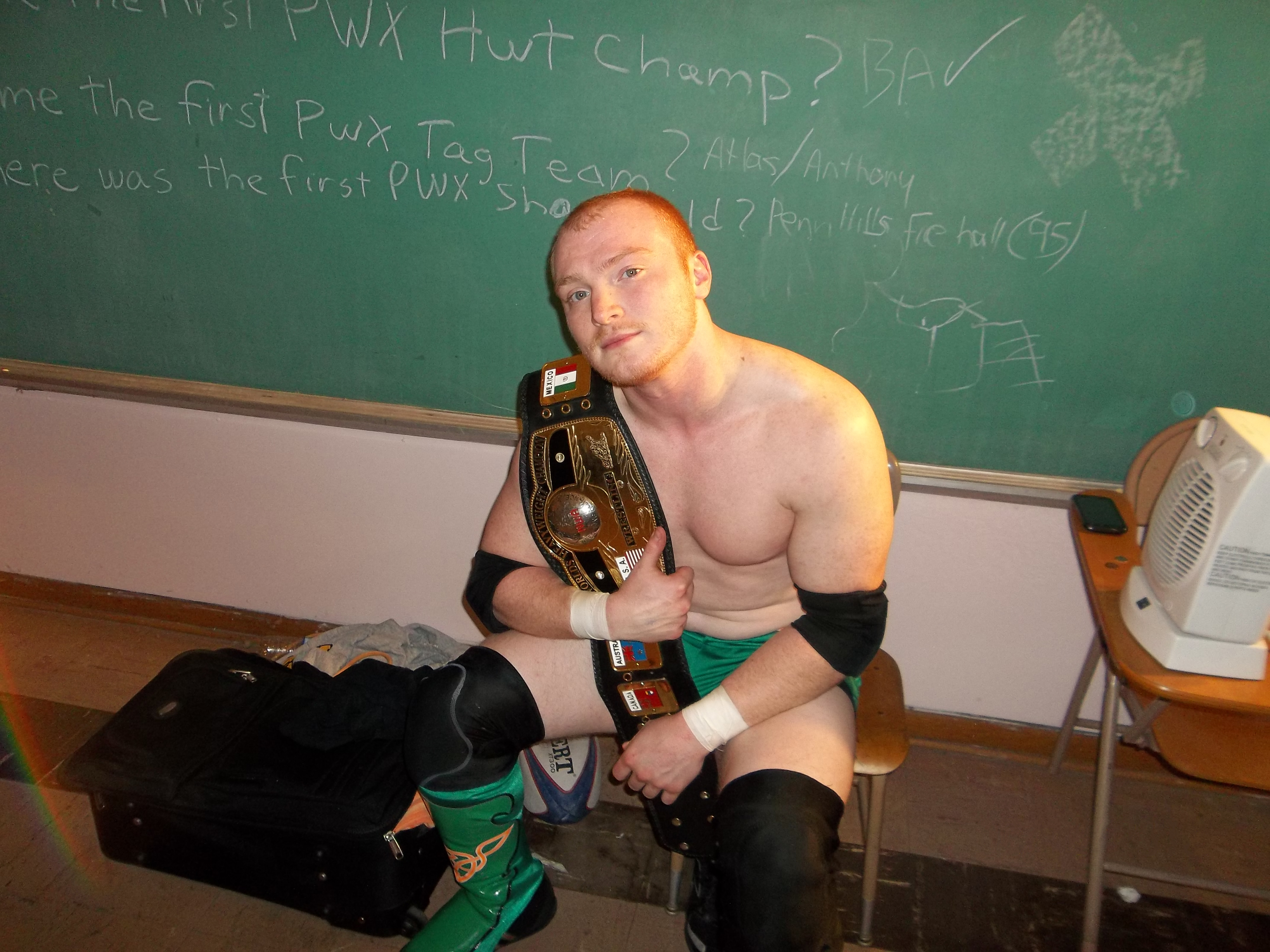
Stryder is the final holder PWX Three Rivers Champion

Ring name	Real name	Notes
A.J. Matthews	A.J. Matthews	
Atticus Cogar	Jordan Cogar	
Beastman	Wes Fetty	
Brandon K	Jason Clements	
Boomer Payne	Unknown	
Bubba the Bulldog	Bubba Snider	
Chris Helmsly	Kevin Pagliai	
Christian Black	Unknown	
Crusher Hansen	Jeffrey Davenport	
David Lawless	Max Petrunya	
Dirk Ciglar	Greg Ciglar	
Don Christopher	Unknown	
Drake Braddock	Unknown	
Duke Davis	Unknown	
Dennis Gregory	Dennis Jendrzejewski	
Ganon Jones, Jr.	Unknown	
Jim LaMotta	Unknown	
Justin Idol	Unknown	
Kid Ego	Unknown	
Todd Thompson	Unknown	NWA East No Barriers Champion
Lee Moriarty	Julian Moriarty	
Lewis	Unknown	PWX Tag Team Champion
Mad Mike	Unknown	
Manic	"Hero Champ"	PWX Heavyweight Champion
Otis Cogar	Unknown	
Patrick Hayes	Unknown	
Quinn Magnum	Unknown	
Ryan Reign	Unknown	PWX Television Champion
Shawn Phoenix	Steve Schneider	
Shirley Doe	Unknown	
Silas Cogar	Unknown	
Stryder	Unknown	PWX Three Rivers Champion
Toryn Flight	Unknown	PWX Tag Team Champion

Female wrestlers

Ring name	Real name	Notes
Leah Vaughan	Leah Vaughan	
Renee Michelle	Unknown	
Solo Darling	Unknown	
Tess Valentine	Unknown	

Referees

Ring name	Real name	Notes
Joe McCoy	Unknown	
P.J. Parker	Unknown	
Shawn Patrick	Unknown	Senior official

Other on-air personnel

Ring name	Real name	Notes
Joe Dombrowski	Joe Dombrowski	Play-by-plan announcer Ring announcer
Hank Hudson	Henry Klimkowski	Ring announcer
Jim Miller	Unknown	Owner

== Events ==
=== Futures Cup Tournament ===
The Futures Cup Tournament is an annual professional wrestling single-elimination tournament produced by the Pro Wrestling eXpress (PWX) promotion, which has been held since 2011.

Year	Name	Date	Location	Notes
2011	Jimmy Nutts	August 2, 2008	McKeesport, Pennsylvania	Defeated Ryan Reign in a tournament final.
2012	Jay Flash	October 27, 2012	McKeesport, Pennsylvania	Defeated Tony Johnson, Danny Able and Deion Cruize in a four-way match.
2014	Cassidy Stone	February 14, 2014	McKeesport, Pennsylvania	The trophy is defended as a new championship when PWX introduces "Futures" live events in 2015. Stone subsequently surrenders the Futures Cup due to injury.
2015	Drake Braddock	April 11, 2015	McKeesport, Pennsylvania	Defeated Joey Vengeance and Graham Wellington in a three-way tournament final.
N/A	Clinton Crooks	June 13, 2015	McKeesport, Pennsylvania	
N/A	Sonny Vice	August 29, 2015	McKeesport, Pennsylvania	
N/A	David Lawless	November 21, 2015	McKeesport, Pennsylvania	
N/A	Sonny Vice	June 11, 2016	McKeesport, Pennsylvania	
N/A	Chris Helmsly	October 1, 2016	McKeesport, Pennsylvania	
N/A	Stryder	November 19, 2016	McKeesport, Pennsylvania	This was a four-way match also involving Drake Braddock and Sonny Vice.
201	Ryan Reign	February 4, 2017	McKeesport, Pennsylvania	

=== Ray Mendez Memorial Tournament ===
The Ray Mendez Memorial Tournament is an annual professional wrestling single-elimination tournament produced by the Pro Wrestling eXpress (PWX) promotion, which was held from 2005 to 2006. It was held in memory of Ray Mendez, a local wrestling fan, who had died. The winner of the tournament earned a title shot for the NWA East / PWX Heavyweight Championship.

Year	Name	Date	Location	Notes
2005	Scottie Gash	April 30, 2005	McKeesport, Pennsylvania	
2006	Sam Slej	April 29, 2006	McKeesport, Pennsylvania	

=== Sean "Shocker" Evans Memorial Tournament ===
The Sean "Shocker" Evans Memorial Tournament is an annual professional wrestling single-elimination tournament produced by the Pro Wrestling eXpress (PWX) promotion, which has been held since 2008. It is held in memory of Sean "Shocker" Evans, the co-founder of PWX, who died from throat cancer on October 2, 2007. It is traditionally the promotion's second biggest event of the year after the PWX Anniversary Show.

Year	Name	Date	Location	Notes
2008	Chris Taylor	August 2, 2008	McKeesport, Pennsylvania	
2009	Ryan Mitchell	August 7, 2009	McKeesport, Pennsylvania	
2010	Stryder	August 6, 2010	McKeesport, Pennsylvania	
2011	Patrick Hayes	July 23, 2011	McKeesport, Pennsylvania	
2012	Jack Pollock	June 29, 2012	McKeesport, Pennsylvania	
2013	Chris Taylor	August 23, 2013	McKeesport, Pennsylvania	
2014	JR Mega	August 30, 2014	McKeesport, Pennsylvania	
2015	Bryan Bowers	September 12, 2015	McKeesport, Pennsylvania	
2016	Beastman	August 20, 2016	McKeesport, Pennsylvania	

== PWX Circle of Respect ==
The PWX Circle of Respect is an American professional wrestling hall of fame maintained by the McKeesport-based promotion Pro Wrestling eXpress (PWX). It was established in 2006 to honor wrestlers who have wrestled for the promotion.

Inductees

#	Year	Ring name (Birth name) (Note: Entries without a birth name indicates that the inductee did not perform under a ring name.)	Notes (Note: This section mainly lists the major accomplishments of each inductee in SCW.)
2		Jim Miller	Founder of Pro Wrestling eXpress
1	2006	Shawn Patrick	2001 PWX Tag Team champion with Kingdom James. Number 12 ranking in NWA World Tag Team championship.
3	2006	Quinn Magnum	Won the PWX Heavyweight Championship (2 times), PWX Three Rivers Championship (2 times), PWX Television Championship (1 time), and PWX Tag Team Championship (5 times), and PWL Tag Team Championship (2 times)
4	2006	Paul Atlas (Paul Fabian)	Won the PWX Heavyweight Championship (1 time), PWX Three Rivers Championship (1 time), PWX Brass Knuckles Championship (1 time) and PWX Tag Team Championship (2 times)
5	2007	Crusher Hansen (Jeffrey Davenport)	Won the PWX Heavyweight Championship (2 times), PWX Three Rivers Championship (2 times), PWX Television Championship (1 time), PWX Tag Team Championship (7 times), and PWL Tag Team Championship (2 times)
6	2008	Sean "Shocker" Evans (Sean Evans)	Won the PWX Heavyweight Championship (2 times), PWX Television Championship (1 time), and PWX Tag Team Championship (1 time)
7	2008	Vince Kaplack	Won the PWX Heavyweight Championship (3 times), PWX Television Championship (1 time), PWX Tag Team Championship (3 times)
8	2008	Big Poppa Gator (David Herchelroath)	Won the PWX Heavyweight Championship (1 time), PWX Tag Team Championship (6 times), and PWL Tag Team Championship (1 time)
9		Brandon K (Jason Clements)	Won the PWX Heavyweight Championship (3 times), PWX Triple Crown Heavyweight Championship (1 time), PWX Three Rivers Championship (1 time), PWX Television Championship (1 time), and PWX Tag Team Championship (6 times)
10	2009	Mad Mike	
11 (Note: Wrestler was originally inducted as part of the Class of 2009 ceremonies but was unable to appear due to the 2009 G20 Pittsburgh summit. His "official" induction ceremony took place at the 2011 edition of the PWX Circle of Respect.)	2009	T. Rantula (David Younkins)	Won the PWX Heavyweight Championship (1 time) and PWX Tag Team Championship (2 times)
12	2009	Brian Anthony (Brian Fabian)	Won the PWX Heavyweight Championship (3 times), PWX Brass Knuckles Championship (1 time) and PWX Tag Team Championship (3 times)
13	2009	Boomer Payne (Joseph Beabout)	Won the PWX Television Championship (2 times), PWX Tag Team Championship (2 times), and PWL Tag Team Championship (1 time)
14	2009	Dennis Gregory (Dennis Jendrzejewski)	Won the PWX North American Heavyweight Championship (4 times), PWX Television Championship (1 time), and PWX Tag Team Championship (1 time)
15	2009	J.B. Destiny (Jason Bareford)	PWX Television Championship (3 times), PWX Tag Team Championship (6 times), and PWL Tag Team Championship (2 times)
16	2010	Scott Venom	
17	2010	Lou Marconi	Won the PWX Heavyweight Championship (1 time), PWX North American Heavyweight Championship (2 times), PWX Three Rivers Championship (1 time), PWX Television Championship (1 time), and PWX Tag Team Championship (1 time)
18		B.A. Briggs (Randy Briggs)	Won the PWX Heavyweight Championship (1 time)
19	2014	Samu (Samula Anoaʻi)	Won the PWX Heavyweight Championship (1 time)

== Championships and programming ==
=== Current championships ===
Championship	Notes
NWA East/PWX Heavyweight Championship	The heavyweight title of NWA East/PWX. It was established in 1995 and was a sanctioned championship of the National Wrestling Alliance from 1997 to 2012. The title was also defended within Allied Independent Wrestling Federations from 2014 through 2016.
NWA East/PWX Tag Team Championship	The tag team title of NWA East/PWX. It was established in 1996 and was a sanctioned championship of the National Wrestling Alliance from 1997 to 2012. The title was also defended within Allied Independent Wrestling Federations from 2014 through 2016.
NWA East/PWX Television Championship	
NWA East/PWX Three Rivers Heavyweight Championship	
PWX Women's Championship	

=== Former championships ===
Championship	Notes
PWX North American Heavyweight Championship	The title was established in 1996 and defended through the year. It was unified with the PWX Television Championship.
PWX Brass Knuckles Championship	The title was established in 2002 and defended until 2012.
PWX No Barriers Championship	The title was established in 2001 and defended through the year.
NWA East Heavyweight Championship	The title was established in 2000 under National Wrestling Alliance affiliate and PWX precursor, NWA East, and continued to be defended through the year. It was unified with the PWL and PWX Heavyweight Championships to create the NWA East / PWX Triple Crown Championship.
NWA East Junior Heavyweight Championship	The title was established in 1999 under NWA East and defended until 2001.
NWA East Tag Team Championship	The title was established in 2000 under NWA East and defended through the year. It was vacated as part of a championship tournament to create the NWA East / PWX Tag Team Championship.
NWA East X Championship	The title was established in 2002 under NWA East and defended through the year. It was unified with the PWX Three Rivers Championship to create the NWA East / PWX Three Rivers Championship.
NWA East SEX Women's Championship	The title was established in 2001 under NWA East and defended through the year.
PWL Heavyweight Championship	The title was established in 1999 under Pittsburgh Wrestling League and defended through the year. It was unified with the NWA East and PWX Heavyweight Championships to create the NWA East / PWX Triple Crown Championship.
PWL Tag Team Championship	The title was established in 2000 under Pittsburgh Wrestling League and defended through the year. It was vacated as part of a championship tournament to create the NWA East / PWX Tag Team Championship.
PWL Triple Jeopardy Heavyweight Championship	The title was established in 2000 under Pittsburgh Wrestling League and defended until 2002. It was unified with the NLW Ironman Championship to create the NWA East / PWX Brass Knuckles Championship.

=== Programming ===
Programming	Notes
PWX Steel City TV	(2013–) Syndicated, also broadcast on WBGN.
NWA East TV	(1995–1998) Syndicated, also broadcast on WPTT.
