= Gibsonville, North Carolina =

- Town
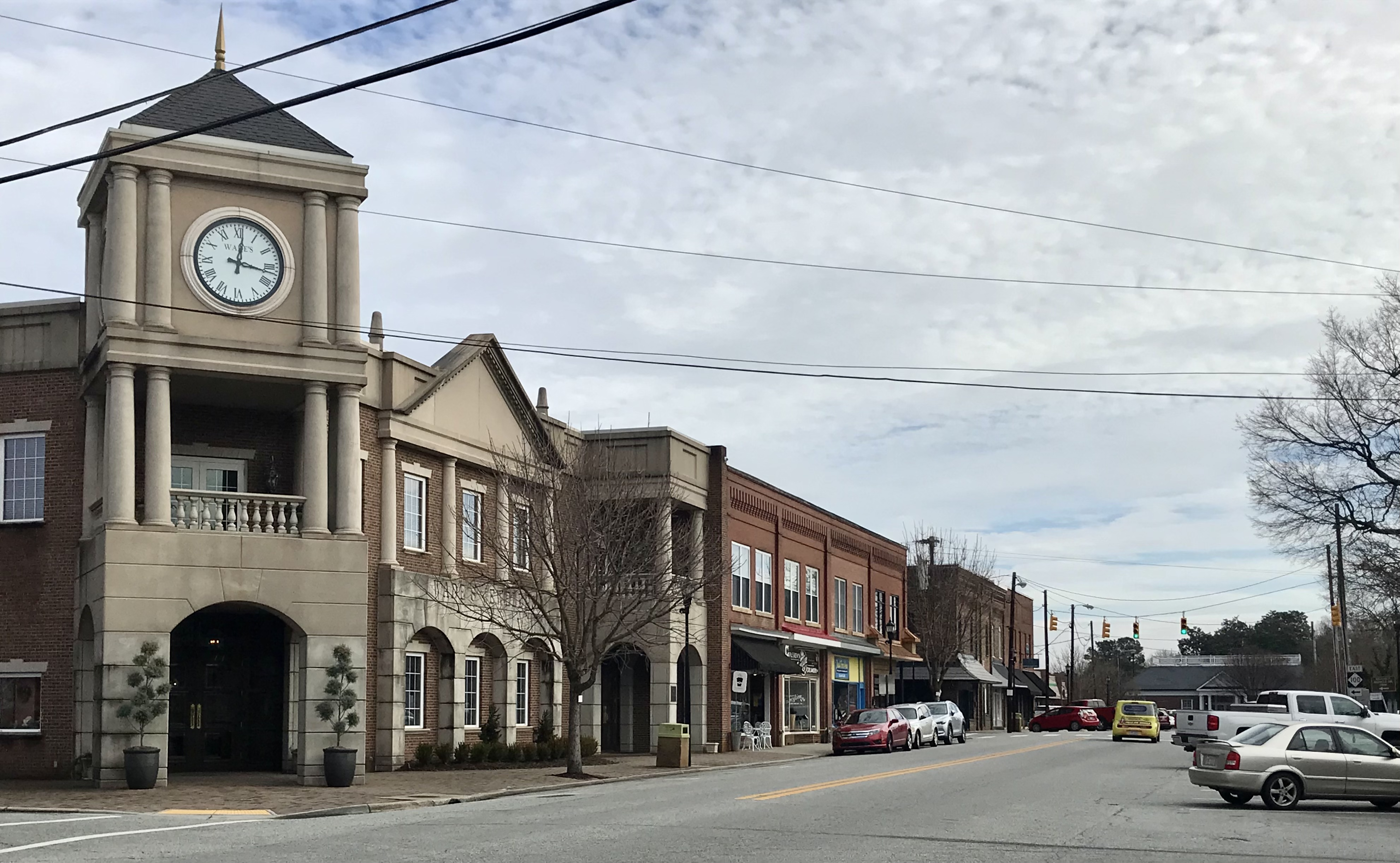
- Main Street

- Seal Logo
- Nickname: "City of Roses"
- Location in Guilford County and the state of North Carolina.

- Location within North Carolina Location within the United States
- Coordinates: 36°06′03″N 79°32′32″W
- Country: United States
- State: North Carolina
- Counties: Guilford, Alamance
- Founded: 1855
- Incorporated: 1871
- Named for: Joseph Gibson

Government
  - Mayor: Bryant Crisp

Area
  - Total: 3.96 sq mi (10.26 km^{2})
  - Land: 3.93 sq mi (10.19 km^{2})
  - Water: 0.023 sq mi (0.06 km^{2})
- Elevation: 705 ft (215 m)

Population (2020)
  - Total: 8,920
  - Density: 2,266.6/sq mi (875.13/km^{2})
- Time zone: UTC-5 (Eastern (EST))
  - Summer (DST): UTC-4 (EDT)
- ZIP code: 27249
- Area code: 336
- FIPS code: 37-25980
- GNIS feature ID: 2406565
- Website: www.gibsonvillenc.org

Gibsonville ("City of Roses") is a town in both Alamance and Guilford counties in the U.S. state of North Carolina. Most of Gibsonville is situated in the Greensboro-Winston-Salem-High Point Combined Statistical Area and the eastern portion is in the Burlington, North Carolina Metropolitan Statistical Area, encompassing all of Alamance County. According to the 2020 census, the population of Gibsonville was 8,971.

== History ==
Joseph Gibson (1785-1857), whose father established farming and gold mining operations in Gibsonville as early as 1775, was a local farmer who provided grading services in 1851 for the newly formed North Carolina Railroad (NCRR) Company. Shortly afterwards Gibsonville began to emerge as a commerce center.

The first train arrived on October 9, 1855, and the depot was named Gibson Station in his honor. On February 18, 1871, the state legislature issued a charter officially establishing the Town of Gibsonville.

Gold mining played a minor role here when deposits were discovered on Gibson Hill (or Gold Hill) south of town in the early 1800s. In August 1899 the Chifar Consolidated Gold Mine Company began crushing ore at a mine a half mile south of the Gibsonville depot.

The town cemetery is located in that area, but no graves have yielded gold. Captain Billy Gilmer owned one of the first stores in town built before 1860, supplying farmers and miners. His wooden general store was at the corner of Main Street and Piedmont Street where Reno's Pizza is now. Several wooden saloons were also located downtown during the frenzied gold mining days, making Gibsonville a rough and ready town with few restrictions.

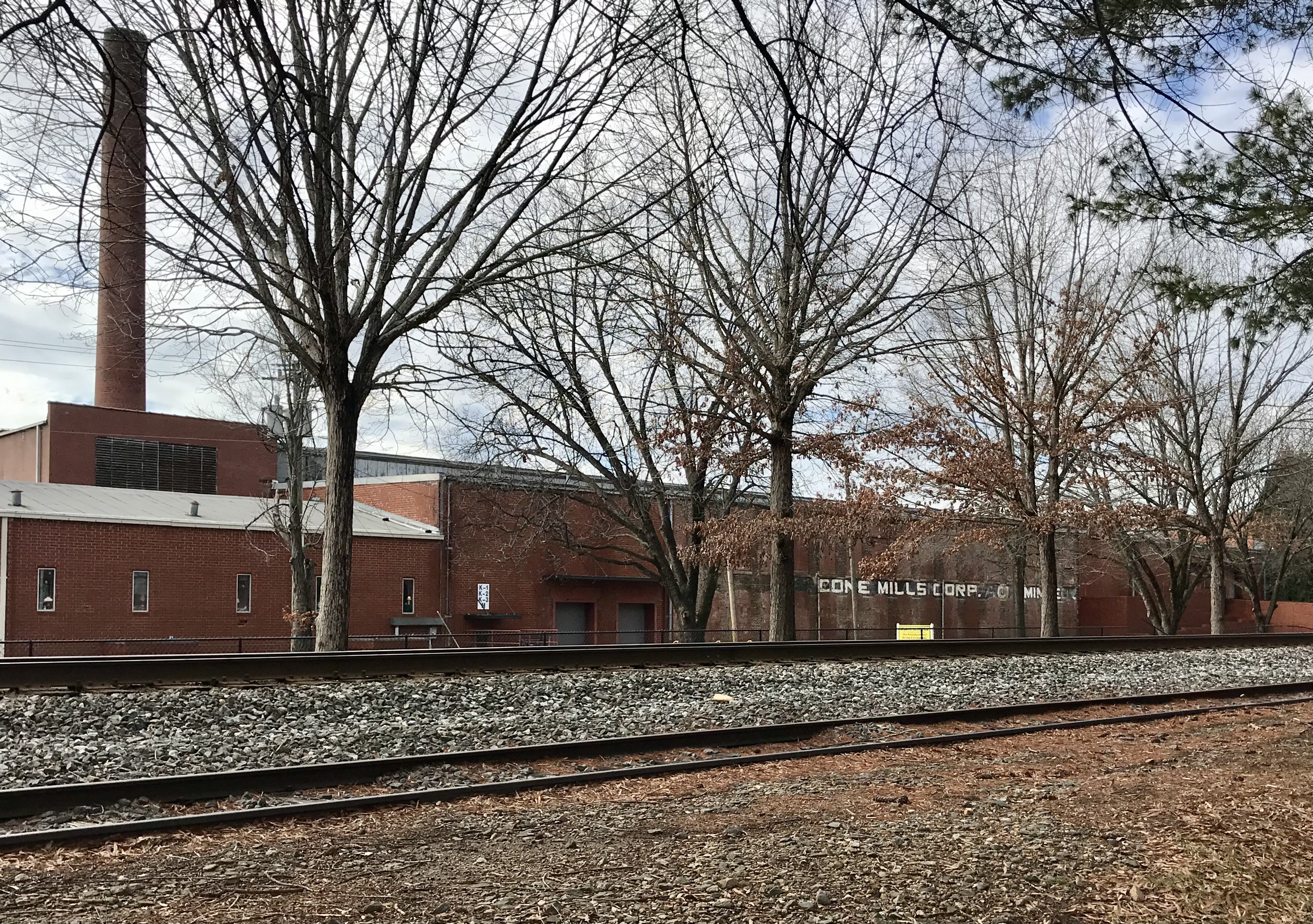
Minneola Cotton Mill

The Depot Greens served as a holding area for livestock and agricultural goods being shipped out on the railroad, which was the primary economic purpose of Gibsonville. In 1886, a local self-taught entrepreneurial mill builder, Berry Davidson, constructed the steam powered Minneola textile mill on Railroad Avenue. Subsequently, he built the Hiawatha textile mill on Eugene Street in 1893. Together, these mills transformed Gibsonville from an agricultural shipping station into a vibrant small town with an industrial base.

In 1894, Dr. Jordan built the first two-story brick building downtown on the corner of Main Street and Lewis Street, where Wade's Jewelry is situated now. The remainder of the brick buildings facing the Greens were built between 1905 and 1920. The early 1920s were a boom time for Gibsonville when Main Street was paved, water and sewer lines installed, and street lights erected. The wooden buildings were replaced with brick structures standing today.

Prior to 1912, the Gibsonville Development Company was founded by leading citizens A. B. Owens, J.W. Burke, and D. M. Davidson (son of Berry Davidson), plus P.L. Kivett later. These civic leaders were responsible for creating the town's telephone exchange, Bank, lumber yard, the Gibsonville Hosiery Mill on Apple Street, multiple, plus several houses. They also expanded the Rock Creek Dairy into the largest dairy in the state.

The town's population grew slowly from 111 residents in 1890 to more than 6,410 in 2010. Most of the rapid growth occurred after 1970 when the town's population was 2,024 residents.

When the mills closed in the 1980s, the town slowly transformed itself into a commuter residential community for the Burlington and Greensboro metro area.

Gibsonville has been known as the "City of Roses" since at least 1920, when train passengers could see the large number of rose bushes along the railroad tracks at the Minneola Mill.

The Gibsonville School, Francis Marion Smith House, and Simeon Wagoner House are listed on the National Register of Historic Places.

== Geography ==
According to the United States Census Bureau, the town has a total area of 3.5 square miles (9.1 km^{2}), of which 0.012 square miles (0.03 km^{2}), or 0.28%, is water.

The town is almost evenly split between Alamance and Guilford counties, though biased towards Guilford County, but, is economically and geographically connected to the town of Elon, and Elon University in Alamance County. Gibsonville was named for Joseph Gibson, a prominent Guilford County planter of the antebellum period. Gibson's Federal-style house remains near Gibsonville and is recognized as a Guilford County landmark property.

== Demographics ==
Historical population
Census	Pop.	Note	%±
1880	111		—
1900	521		—
1910	1,162		123.0%
1920	1,302		12.0%
1930	1,605		23.3%
1940	1,753		9.2%
1950	1,866		6.4%
1960	1,784		−4.4%
1970	2,019		13.2%
1980	2,865		41.9%
1990	3,441		20.1%
2000	4,372		27.1%
2010	6,410		46.6%
2020	8,920		39.2%
2025 (est.)	9,876	▲	10.7%
U.S. Decennial Census

=== 2020 census ===
Gibsonville racial composition
Race	Number	Percentage
White (non-Hispanic)	5,830	65.36%
Black or African American (non-Hispanic)	1,920	21.52%
Native American	23	0.26%
Asian	168	1.88%
Other/Mixed	417	4.67%
Hispanic or Latino	562	6.3%

As of the 2020 census, Gibsonville had a population of 8,920. The median age was 40.2 years. 23.7% of residents were under the age of 18 and 17.9% were 65 years of age or older. For every 100 females, there were 87.8 males, and for every 100 females age 18 and over, there were 84.3 males age 18 and over.

99.9% of residents lived in urban areas, while 0.1% lived in rural areas.

There were 3,493 households and 1,895 families in Gibsonville. Of those households, 35.2% had children under the age of 18 living in them; 52.6% were married-couple households; 12.5% had a male householder and no spouse or partner present; and 28.5% had a female householder and no spouse or partner present. About 22.5% of all households were made up of individuals, and 10.8% had someone living alone who was 65 years of age or older.

There were 3,653 housing units, of which 4.4% were vacant. The homeowner vacancy rate was 1.1% and the rental vacancy rate was 5.3%.

=== 2000 census ===
As of the census of 2000, there were 4,372 people, 1,707 households, and 1,206 families residing in the town. The population density was 1,857.3 inhabitants per square mile (717.1/km^{2}). There were 1,822 housing units at an average density of 774.0 per square mile (298.8/km^{2}). The racial makeup of the town was 80.17% White, 15.53% African American, 0.39% Native American, 0.75% Asian, 1.74% from other races, and 1.42% from two or more races. Hispanic or Latino of any race were 2.72% of the population.

There were 1,707 households, out of which 37.3% had children under the age of 18 living with them, 54.8% were married couples living together, 12.6% had a female householder with no husband present, and 29.3% were non-families. 23.6% of all households were made up of individuals, and 8.9% had someone living alone who was 65 years of age or older. The average household size was 2.56 and the average family size was 3.05.

In the town, the population was spread out, with 28.0% under the age of 18, 7.8% from 18 to 24, 31.7% from 25 to 44, 22.7% from 45 to 64, and 9.9% who were 65 years of age or older. The median age was 36 years. For every 100 females, there were 91.8 males. For every 100 females age 18 and over, there were 85.6 males.

The median income for a household in the town was $42,989, and the median income for a family was $51,164. Males had a median income of $36,025 versus $24,740 for females. The per capita income for the town was $21,142. About 5.7% of families and 8.9% of the population were below the poverty line, including 10.1% of those under age 18 and 18.9% of those age 65 or over.

== Education ==
The portion in Guilord County is in the Guilford County Schools school district.

The portion in Alamance County is in the Alamance-Burlington School System school district.

== Notable people ==
Sisters Kay Yow (N.C. State Women's basketball coach) and Deborah Yow (athletic director) are natives of Gibsonville.

The NFL's Torry Holt (Rams and Jaguars) and his brother Terrence Holt (Lions, Cardinals, Bears, Panthers, Saints) are both natives of Gibsonville.

Basketball player Jesse Branson, professional wrestler Luther Lindsay, supercentenarian Emma Tillman, Canadian football player John Wagoner and baseball pitcher Lefty West have also resided in Gibsonville.
