= Ric Converse =

American professional wrestler (born 1979)

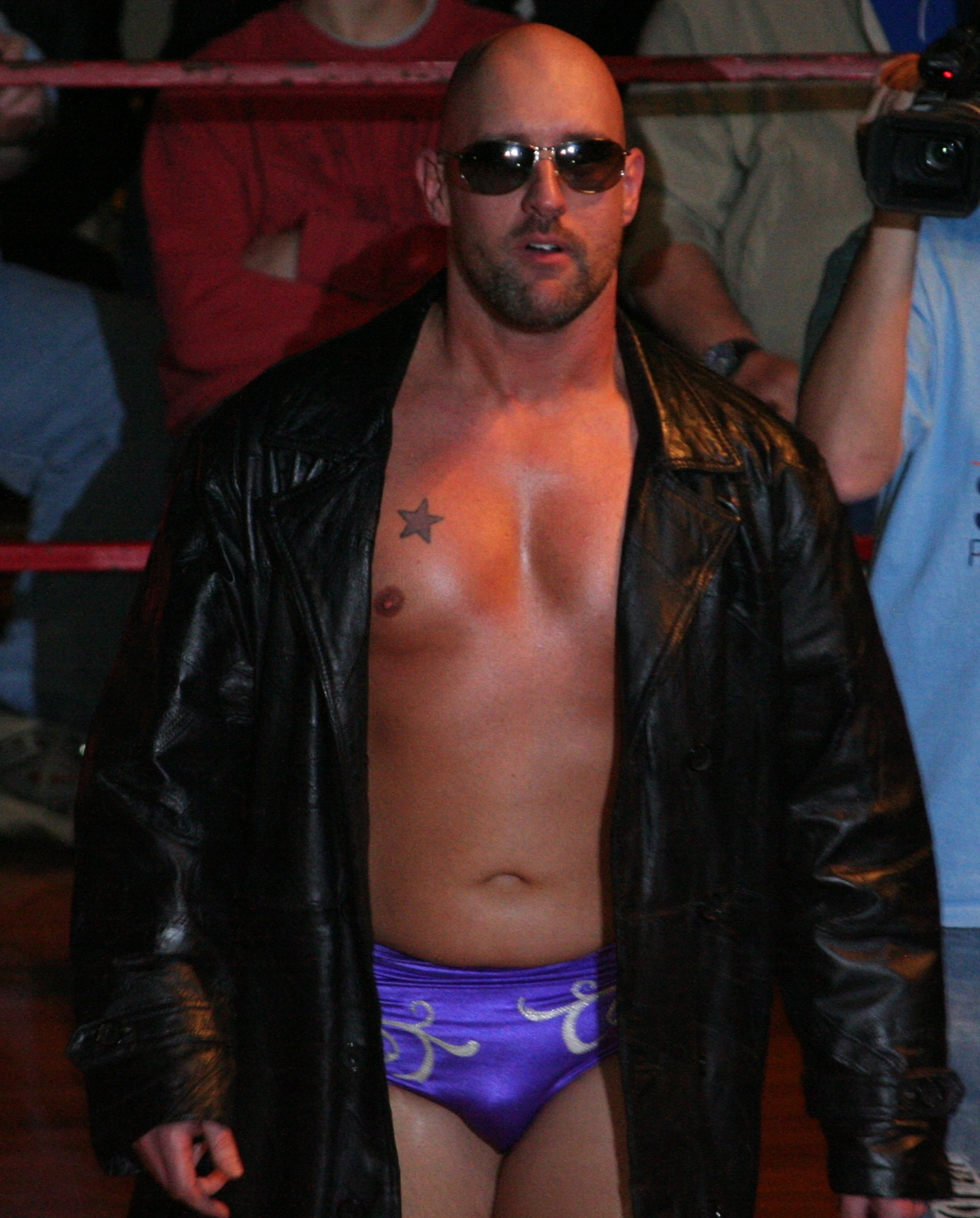
- Converse in 2012

Personal information
- Born: Richard Converse; December 26, 1979 (age 46) Winston-Salem, North Carolina, U.S.
- Website: Official website

Professional wrestling career
- Ring name(s): Ric Converse; Slick Ric
- Billed height: 6 ft 1 in (1.85 m)
- Billed weight: 225 lb (102 kg)
- Trained by: Ken Spence
- Debut: January 23, 1999

Richard "Ric" Converse (born December 26, 1979) is an American professional wrestler. He is one of the top "heels" on the Southeastern independent circuit, especially in the Carolinas, and previous appearances for CWF Mid-Atlantic where he is a record 6-time CWF Mid-Atlantic Champion. He has wrestled for a considerable number of other independent wrestling promotions, most notably, Count Grog's Southern Championship Wrestling, NWA Carolinas, and Pro Wrestling ZERO1-MAX. He was also a star in the short-lived AWA Superstars promotion holding both the promotion's world heavyweight title and tag team title (with Xsiris) during 2006 and 2007.

== Early life ==
Converse was born in Winston-Salem, North Carolina. In 1998, he graduated from Robert B. Glenn High School in Kernersville, North Carolina. A victim of bullying as a child, Converse was inspired after watching Hulk Hogan on television and decided on a career as a professional wrestler when he was only 8-years-old. On September 15, 1998, Converse enrolled at Ken Spence's School of Pro Wrestling and spent the next four months in training.

== Professional wrestling career ==
=== Early career (1999–2002) ===
Converse made his professional debut on January 23, 1999, wrestling a tag team match with Mr. X against Dr. Feelgood and Double Trouble at Winston-Salem's VFW Hall. He went on to wrestle for a number of local "indy" promotions during the first two years of his career: Alternative Championship Wrestling, Carolina Championship Wrestling Alliance, New Empire Wrestling, Ringside Championship Wrestling, Southern Wrestling Alliance, and the World Wrestling Alliance. He also had a brief stint in Count Grog's Southern Championship Wrestling.

It was during this period that Converse developed a cocky "heel" in-ring persona, calling himself "Slick Ric" and "Slick Diddy", parodies of pro wrestler "The Nature Boy" Ric Flair and rapper P. Diddy respectively. His first major feud was with the Lumbee Warrior. Ten months into his rookie year he scored his first-ever victory by pinning the Warrior in July 1999. The two men eventually formed a tag team together, "Sudden Impact", which led to his first title victory on March 17, 2001, with an ECPW Tag Team title victory alongside his erstwhile rival. On September 7, 2001, he and Persephone teamed up a WWA show in Statesville, North Carolina, to defeat Mikael Yamaha and Amber Holly in a mixed tag team match. The following summer, Converse had won the major single titles of three different promotions in a three-week period. He was named "Performer of the Year" (2002) by the pro wrestling website IndyInsiders.com that same year.

=== FWA-Carolinas (2002–2004) ===
Converse began wrestling for FWA-Carolinas, one of two US affiliates for the Frontier Wrestling Alliance, in early-2002 where he aligned himself with manager Brad Stutts' Hostile Youth Project (HYP) with GeeStar, Special K, and J.T. Sparxx. He and GeeStar specifically feuded with Mikael Yamaha and Amber Holly, then FWA Women's World Champion, both in FWA-Carolinas and other promotions. Their first match, on April 26, 2002, at Final Judgement in Graham, North Carolina, resulted in Converse pinning Yamaha after knocking him out with Holly's championship belt. At Spring Showdown on May 11, they were joined by J.T. Sparxx for a 6-man tag team match against The Gemini Kid, Mikael Yamaha, and Amber Holly. The match ended with a second victory for the HYP when Converse pinned Yamaha after Stutts hit his opponent with a briefcase. Converse followed this up by winning the FWA-Carolinas Cruiserweight Championship from Sexton Tyler on July 20 at Payback. A third and final mixed tag match took place at Explosive Elements on August 17, 2002, at A.L. Brown Middle School in Kannapolis, North Carolina, which saw Sexton Tyler, Mikael Yamaha, and Amber Holly defeat Corey Edsel, Ric Converse, and GeeStar.

The following year Converse appeared on the first episode of CWF Championship Wrestling where he lost his title to J-Money, ending his seven-month championship reign. He subsequently entered the heavyweight division and spent the next few months feuding with FWA-Carolinas Heavyweight Champion Corey Edsel who had previously left the HYP months earlier. The two finally met on August 9, 2003, in Wentworth, North Carolina. Outside interference from Brad Stutts unintentionally caused Converse to lose the match. Afterwards, Converse turned against Stutts and hit him with his finisher. He was the last of the original HYPmembers to leave the group.

The Converse-Edsel feud continued throughout the year and, on December 27, 2003, Converse defeated Corey Edsel for the title at the FWA-Carolinas Anniversary Show. On January 17, 2004, he teamed with Shane West and Garry Stevens in a losing effort to Corey Edsel, Bounty Hunter, and Rob McBride. At the end of the month, Converse defeated both Edsel and ACW Heavyweight Champion Quinson Valentino to unify CWF and ACW titles. Converse was one of the wrestlers Valentino thanked upon his retirement four years later. Over the next four months, Converse successfully defended the title against Rob McBride, Bounty Hunter, Kid Justice, Trent Wylde, and Joey Silvia. He also took part in tag team matches. On March 6, he and Brad Rainz were beaten by Bounty Hunter and Otto Schwanz. He also teamed with Shane West and Garry Stevens to beat Brass Munkey, American Steel Ninja, and Corey Edsel on April 17. Converse was later awarded a new title belt by legendary announcer Bob Caudle which resembled the old NWA Mid-Atlantic Heavyweight Championship. He also continued his rivalry with Edsel and lost to him in a non-title match on May 15. Their next meeting on July 10 ended in a double-countout. On August 28, he entered the 2004 Johnny Weaver Cup tournament in Thomasville, North Carolina, and lost to Corey Edsel in the finals. Another match on September 15 ended in a time-limit draw. Converse finally lost the title to Corey Edsel on October 2.

Converse was unable to regain the title from Edsel in subsequent rematches, however, he did win an impressive victory over David Flair on October 23. He formed a brief partnership with Trent Wylde and Brad Attitude at the end of the year joining them in one or two 6-man tag team bouts. On November 20, the three wrestled Orlo, Kid Justice, and Jesse Ortega. A week later, he and Trent Wylde lost a tag team match to J-Money and Will B. Smooth at an interpromotional SWA/CWF Mid-Atlantic show. On December 4, 2004, Converse and Wylde were defeated by Corey Edsel and Orlo.

=== AWA Mid-Atlantic (2004–2006) ===
On December 18, 2004, Converse regained the heavyweight championship from Edsel in Burlington, North Carolina. Earlier that year, the CWF had become the official AWA Superstars affiliate for the Mid-Atlantic United States and the title was renamed the AWA Mid-Atlantic Heavyweight Championship. His second reign as champion lasted over six months with wins over Xsiris, Brad Attitude, Otto Schwanz, The Gemini Kid, "Wild" Shane West, Jesse "El Fuego" Ortega, Donnie Dollars, and Mitch Conner. On May 21, 2005, Conner defeated Converse in a non-title match. A month later, he was also on the losing end of a 6-man tag team match with The $outh$ide Playas (J-Money and Will B. Smooth) (with Kiyia Moka) against Shane West, The Shadow, and Garry Stevens. Converse defended the title in a singles match against Stevens on June 24, which he won, but lost the title to him in a "King of the Road" match three weeks later at Friday Night Fights 2.

Despite losing the title, Converse continued to be successful in the singles division defeating Bobby Ramone, Mitch Connor, and Julios Augustus during the summer. On August 19, he and Brad Attitude defeated Garry Stevens and Michael McAllister in a tag team match. The next night, however, he and The $outh$ide Playas lost a 6-man tag team match to Stevens, Mitch Conner, and The Shadow. Converse and Jesse Ortega defeated Garry Stevens and Super Spoiler in yet another tag match on September 10. A week later, he unsuccessfully challenged Steve Corino for the AWA World Heavyweight Championship in a bout lasting nearly 40 minutes. Converse also made appearances in other companies during this time, Big Time Wrestling and Carolina Wrestling Association, with he and Brad Thomas defeating Beau James and Sheik of Araby on September 27 in the former promotion.

On October 1, Converse won the 5th annual 30-man "CWF Rumble" to earn a title show for the championship of his choice. He and Chris Vega were the first two entrants and eliminated Alex Adonis (with GeeStar, Kamakazi Kid, and Xsiris), Donnie Dollars (with Rob McBride), Coco Rojo, Brad Attitude (with Marcellus King), and Marcellus King to win the event. He lasted a total of 36 minutes and 57 seconds setting a new record as the longest time in the CWF Rumble and, as of 2012, remains unbroken. The following month, he wrestled Shannon Moore at a November 5 CWF show in Burlington, North Carolina. He was also accompanied by Harley Race in his match against Jake Manning for a Carolina Wrestling Association show on November 17; he returned to the CWA a month later where he and Jesse Ortega lost a tag team match to Jake Manning and Jason Jones. On December 3, Converse teamed with Joey Silvia beat The Street Sweepers (Gregory Vercetti and Jay Sinn) in a Bounty match. Two weeks later, Converse defeated Garry Stevens in a "Winner Take All" Steel Cage match at BattleCade VI to regain the AWA Mid-Atlantic Heavyweight Championship. Due to the pre-match stipulations, Converse also received a title shot against then AWA World Heavyweight Champion Steve Corino. Corino lost the title to Shinjiro Otani only a week prior to their scheduled match, which saw Converse successfully retain the AWA Mid-Atlantic title.

In early-2006, Converse formed a brief partnership with Joey Silva. On January 7, 2006, they defeated Alpha & Omega (Julius Augustus & Marcellus King). On February 4, they joined Xsiris in a 6-man tag team match to wrestle Marcellus King, Brandon Day, and Tony Kozina. A week later, he wrestled Johnny Blaze on a special "legends" show for Carolina Championship Wrestling at the sold-out Mulberry Rec Center in Lenoir, North Carolina, also featuring Amber O'Neal, Krissy Vaine, The Midnight Express (Dennis Condrey and Bobby Eaton), The Rock 'n' Roll Express (Robert Gibson and Ricky Morton), Total Protection ([[Curtis Hughes[Mr. Hughes]] and The Barbarian), Tom Prichard, Bob Armstrong, Brad Armstrong, George South, Ronnie Garvin, Tully Blanchard, and Dusty Rhodes. On February 18, Converse again teamed with Joey Silva and Xsiris to wrestle Alpha & Omega and Brandon Day which ended in a no-contest. Trent Wylde joined the match on the pretense of helping Converse after Silva was injured, bowing out at the last minute, and Xsiris became incapacitated. Silva later returned to ringside where he and Wylde turned on Converse. Wylde, who had previously been banned from the promotion, was reinstated by Commissioner William L. Cross at the request of Converse following the attack. Silva and Wylde subsequently formed "The New Dynasty" which was intended to mock the stable which Converse had founded.

On a March 11 television taping for CWF Championship Wrestling, interference from Silva and Wylde cost Converse his match against Marcus King, losing via countout. On April 9, he defended his title in Pro-Wrestling WORLD-1 against Justin Smith. On April 22, he defeated Tracy Smothers at CWF's Carolina Sports Arena. The following week at Gate City Superclash in Greensboro, North Carolina, he faced Joey Silvia, Trent Wylde, and Steve Green in a 6-man tag team match with Xsiris and Jesse Ortega, which Converse's team lost. On May 13, a "best of four" team series was held between Team Dynasty (Joey Silva, Trent Wylde and Steve Greene) and Team Converse (Ric Converse, Jesse Ortega and Xsiris) at AC Fitness in Greensboro. Team Dynasty ended up winning the match series when Greene defeated Ric Converse in a no-submission, falls count anywhere "West Market Street Fight". This also allowed Greene to pick the opponent for Converse's next title defense. The opponent was revealed to be Converse's teammate Xsiris with their match ending in a no-contest. It was strongly hinted by The New Dynasty the Xsiris was their newest member, and while it appeared as though Xsiris was going to side with the group during their match, he ended up staying loyal to Converse. Afterwards, Converse challenged The New Dynasty to a 6-man tag match between members of the Original Dynasty versus Silva and Wyle's recent incarnation, which was accepted by his arch-rivals. The two teams met at CWF's Summer Action Series on June 10 which saw Converse, Xsiris, and Brad Attitude beat Steve Greene, Joey Silvia, and Trent Wylde.

=== AWA Superstars (2006–2007) ===
Converse (now dubbing himself "The 1st" Ric Converse) won the AWA World Heavyweight Championship when he defeated ZERO1 wrestler Takao Omori for the title in Indianapolis, Indiana, on June 14, 2006. Converse achieved a near-7 month reign before finally being defeated by Steve Corino on January 7, 2007, including victories over WWE superstars John Heidenreich and Aaron Aguilera, and Ring of Honor's Ricky Landell.

Meanwhile, in his home promotion, Converse continued feuding with The New Dynasty. At the August 5th Summer Action Series, the original Dynasty defeated Joey Silvia, Trent Wylde, and AWA World-1 Champion Ricky Landell. Less than a week later, Converse successfully defended the AWA World title against Aaron Aguilera at AWA Super Clash in Amite, Louisiana. On August 21, Converse also defended his title at a CWF show against Otto Schwanz. In the fall of 2006, Converse toured the Mid-Atlantic defending the AWA World title against Ken Magnum in AWA Power Pro and Damian Wayne in NWA Virginia.

On November 18, the Original Dynasty (Ric Converse, Brad Attitude and Xsiris) beat The New Dynasty (Joey Silvia, Steve Greene, and Jake Manning) (with Ty Dillenger) in Best 2-of-3 Falls match to win the rights to the Dynasty name. This match also saw the end of Converse's year-long feud with The New Dynasty, however, he did face Silvia once more in a singles match at BattleCade VII for the AWA World Heavyweight Championship on December 30, 2006. One week after this match, Converse dropped the belt to Corino in Pottstown, Pennsylvania. Weeks earlier, Converse had interfered in an AWA World Tag Team Championship match between The Old School Blondes (Steve Corino and Ricky Landell) and AWA Mid-Atlantic Champions Tank Lawson and Rob McBride, counting the pinfall which awarded the belts to Lawson and McBride. Corino and Landell made an official complaint to the AWA Board of Directors, which was supported by Commissioner William L. Cross, and the belts were returned to their former owners.

Three months after his world title loss Converse and Xsiris, as "The New Generation Dynasty", defeated Ricky Landell and Jonnie Stewart at AWA Power Pro Wrestling's "Night of Champions" for the AWA World Tag Team Championship at Union Pines High School in Cameron, North Carolina. Stewart was substituting for Landell's regular tag team partner Steve Corino who was touring Australia at the time. He and Xsiris successfully defended the titles in AWA Mid-Atlantic against Fatback Enterprises (Mitch Connor and Donnie Dollars) at Enter The Triad on April 14 and against Mitch Connor and Jesse Ortega in a non-title Texas Tornado match at a CWF-MAX! show a week later. At Cinco De Mayhem on May 5, Converse and Kamakazi Kid defeated AWA Mid-Atlantic Heavyweight Champion Joey Silvia, AWA Mid-Atlantic Television Champion Steve Greene, and CWF Mid-Atlantic Commissioner Ty Dillinger in a 3-on-2 handicap match. Near the end of his tag team title reign Converse met Steve Corino, accompanied by C. W. Anderson, in a special grudge match at a show for UWF Wrestling in Greensboro, North Carolina. Converse and Xsiris were eventually stripped of the AWA World Tag Team titles which were returned to the former champions Ricky Landell and Jonnie Stewart in Indianapolis, Indiana, on June 13. Converse and Xsiris were still billed as the champions when they appeared at CWF Mid-Atlantic's Absolute Justice three days later. In the main event, they wrestled The Neon Lions (Lee Valiant and Chris Collins), AWA Mid-Atlantic Heavyweight Champion Joey Silvia and AWA Mid-Atlantic Television Champion Steve Greene, and AWA Mid-Atlantic Tag Team Champions Rob McBride and Tank Lawson in an "Everything To Lose" Four Corners tag team match.

=== CWF Mid-Atlantic (2007–2010) ===
A few weeks after losing the AWA World Tag Team title, AWA Superstars was forced to drop the CWF and other promotions as an AWA affiliate due to a court order. Converse remained with his home promotion, CWF Mid-Atlantic, where he resumed his feud with Joey Silvia. He wrestled Silvia for the CWF Mid-Atlantic Heavyweight Championship at an August 11 CWF Championship Wrestling television taping defeating Silvia via disqualification; this was the first championship match to end in a DQ in over seven years. He followed this up with victories over Little J at the 2007 Johnny Weaver Cup tournament on August 25 and Corey Edsel at Sumner Civitan SuperClash on September 8. Despite the win over the legend, Converse still has a losing record against Edsel. Later that month, Destiny's manager Ty Dillinger "set up" Converse's brother Joseph for an attack by Silvia and Steve Greene resulting in a broken arm and an overnight stay in a local hospital. Two days after the attack, Converse "went berserk" at a TV taping for CWF Championship Wrestling interfering in a match between CWF Mid-Atlantic Rising Generation League Champion Roy Wilkins and "Jersey" Nick Richards, attacking both men with a steel chair, and knocking out the referee. He was eventually confronted by one-time rival Garry Stevens and the two agreed to join forces against Dynasty.

Converse entered CWF Mid-Atlantic's "Lethal Lottery" in Greensboro a week later. Using rules similar to World Championship Wrestling's Battlebowl, the participants were chosen at random with the winning teams meeting in a 10-man "Battle Bowl Battle Royal" main event. Converse was paired with Steve Greene (with Ty Dillinger) and the two defeated Gemini Kid and Black Pegasus to advance to the battle royal. Greene later eliminated Converse to win the Battle Bowl and become the 30th entrant in the upcoming "CWF Rumble". Converse himself was the 24th entrant at the "CWF Rumble!" on October 6 and the third last participant to be eliminated. Afterwards, he and former CWF Mid-Atlantic Commissioner William L. Cross got into a brawl with Ty Dillinger and Destiny which had to be broken up by security. Converse and Cross later accepted a challenge from Dillinger to a "street fight" with Destiny at an upcoming show. At Date With Destiny on October 20, Team Cross (William L. Cross, Ric Converse and Garry Stevens) defeated Destiny (Ty Dillinger, Joey Silvia and Steve Greene) in a double pinfall with Stevens pinning Silvia for the CWF Mid-Atlantic Heavyweight Championship and Cross pinning Ty Dillinger to regain his position as CWF Commissioner. Blamed for the loss, Silvia was attacked by his stablemates Steve Greene and The VIPs (Jesse Ortega and Gemini Kid) causing the breakup of Destiny.

With the end of his feud with Destiny, Converse challenged newly crowned heavyweight champion Garry Stevens. Shortly after their victory at Date With Destiny, Converse was attacked by his former ally at an October 3 CWF Championship Wrestling television taping. At Ultimate Survivor IV on November 17, Converse and a mystery partner (revealed to be Dynasty's Brad Attitude) defeated Stevens and Steve Greene in a "Triathlon Survivor" Best 2-of-3 Falls tag team match. Converse regained the CWF Mid-Atlantic Heavyweight Championship from Stevens in an Iron Man match at Battlecade VIII on December 15, 2007. At the end of the 60 min. time limit the score was tied (2–2) and went into overtime with Converse winning via submission when Stevens' daughter Brandi Richardson and Stevens cornerman Little Billy threw in the towel. After the match Stevens announced his retirement and shook hands with the new champion.

On January 5, 2008, Converse pinned Rising Generation League Champion "Jersey" Nick Richards in a non-title match at New Year's Knockout. A few weeks later, he made his first title defense against CWF Mid-Atlantic Television Champion Steve Greene at A Cold Day in Hell on January 19, 2008. On February 2, Converse reunited with Xsiris to defeat CWF Mid-Atlantic Tag Team Champion Jesse Ortega and Marcellus King (with Sheik Lumpkin). Due to the pre-match stipulation, Xsiris and Kamakazi Kid won the right to challenge The VIPs for the tag team titles; the champions had previously stopped defefending the belts against US tag teams.

At Civitans SuperBrawl II on April 19, Converse faced longtime friend Rob "Boogie Woogie Man" McBride. The following month, he joined McBride and Tank Lawson in a 6-Man Tag Team match against Gemini Kid, Jesse Ortega, and CWF Mid-Atlantic TV Champion Steve Greene at Six Man Vendetta on May 3. He also had successful title defenses against Evan Banks at Revelations and Matthew de Nero at Fallout!. It was at the latter event that Commissioner Cross, who had since "turned heel ", confronted Converse demanding that he join his new "Aftermath" stable. Converse, supported by McBride and Brass Munkey, refused the offer causing Cross to make McBride his next opponent. Their match at Absolute Justice II saw McBride defeat Converse for the belt, however, a distraction by Cross and the Aftermath (in the form of a coded message on the Insiders-Tron) revealed was indeed the newest member of the Aftermath. On August 16, Converse entered the 2008 Johnny Weaver Memorial Cup tournament and lost in the finals to Brass Munkey in a Triple Threat match with Marcellus King. Over the summer he was also a guest on the Canadian internet radio show Tha O Show hosted by Big Daddy Donnie and Dan-e-o where he shared a somewhat risque road story during his early career.

Converse (with Commissioner Cross and an unknown masked man) attempted to win the title back from McBride in the fall. He was unsuccessful at Sumner Civitans SuperBrawl III on September 6 but regained the belt in a "street fight challenge" at Fatback Rising! two weeks later. After a victory over Otto Schwanz at the 8th annual CWF Rumble!, Converse and stablemate Ryan O'Reilly briefly feuded with CWF Mid-Atlantic Tag Team Champions Xsiris and Mikael Yamaha. They lost to the tag team champions at CWF Mid-Atlantic's "200th Live Event Celebration" on November 1. With Soloman Spades, they also lost a best 2-of-3 falls 6-man tag team match to Xsiris, Yamaha, and Brass Munkey at Ultimate Survivor VI on November 15. Converse ended up losing the heavyweight title to Brass Munkey at BattleCade IX on December 20, 2008.

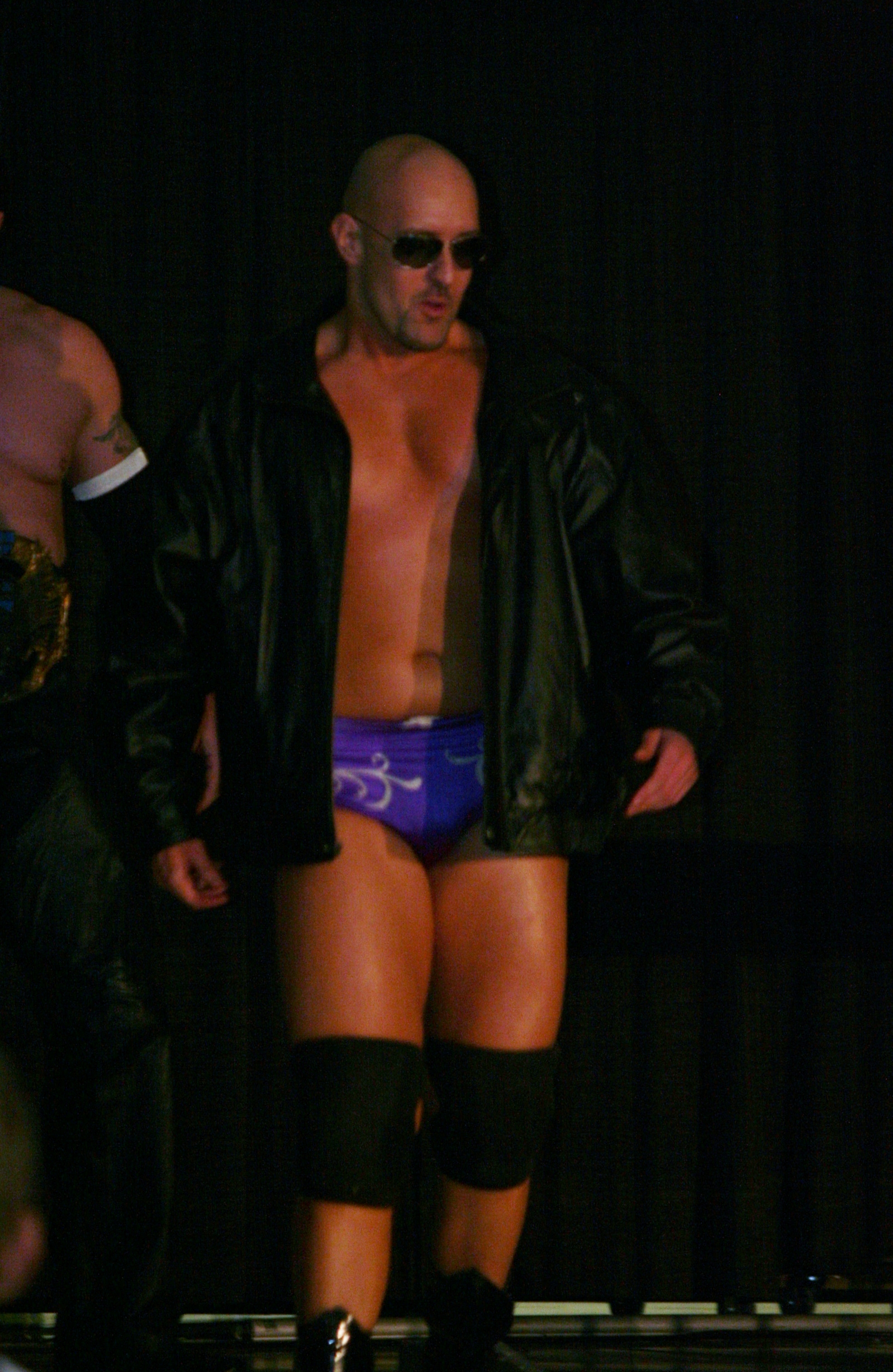
Converse making his entrance in 2011

On January 3, 2009, at New Years Knockout, Alex Adonis interrupted an in-ring promo with Converse and William L. Cross to issue a challenge to the former champion. Adonis had been brought into the CWF by Converse several years earlier and pointed out that he was the only person on the active roster that Converse had never beaten. Converse responded by leading the Aftermath in a 4-on-1 attack on the young wrestler and leaving him unconscious in the ring. Two weeks later, he and O'Reilly again wrestled Xsiris and Mikael Yamaha for the CWF Mid-Atlantic Tag Team Championship at Night of Challenges but were unable to win the belts. He also faced former rivals Joey Silvia and Steve Greene in a tag team match with Marcellus King at End of an Era on February 7. At Fallout! on February 21, he pinned Cecil Scott.

Nearly two months after New Years Knockout, Converse finally met Alex Adonis in a match at Don't Call It A Comeback! on March 7, which he won by pinfall. He and Marcellus King also defeated Adonis and Mitch Connor in a tag team match at Holding Out For A Hero! later that month. On April 4, Converse attempted to interfere in the Adonis-King match at Nowhere To Run! but was unable to prevent Adonis' victory. Afterwards Commissioner Garry Stevens ordered Converse to face Adonis, with The Kamakazi Kid as special guest referee, at the promotion's next show. Converse's match against Adonis at The Bunkhouse Stampede on April 25 ended in his defeat.

On May 5, Converse defeated Chiva Kid by submission in a non-title match at Heartache Tonight. At the end of the month at Goodbye, Farewell & Amen Converse took part in a 10-man Farewell match with Steve Greene, Michael McAllister, and The VIPs (Gemini Kid and Jesse Ortega) wrestling Mikael Yamaha, Lee Valiant, Brass Munkey, Corey Edsel, and Amber O'Neal. At Absolute Justice III on June 20 Converse lost to Kamakazi Kid in a grudge match. He also entered the 2009 Johnny Weaver Memorial Cup tournament and made it to the finals in Burlington where he was eliminated by Kamakazi Kid on August 15.

On September 9, Converse and King joined Joey Silvia, Steve Greene, and Ty Dillinger (with William L. Cross and Jaxson Dane) at Fatback Rising 2 to defeat CWF Mid-Atlantic Heavyweight Champion Brass Munkey, Rob McBride, Kamakazi Kid, and The Neon Lions (Lee Valiant and Chris Collins) in a 10-man tag team match. Converse also defeated Tank Lawson at SuperBrawl IV on September 12 and teamed with Jaxson Dane to beat CWF Heavyweight Champion Brass Munkey and Kamakazi Kid in a tag team match at Unfinished Business a week later. At Ultimate Survivor VII, Converse was teamed with Xsiris, Alex Adonis, and Brass Munkey during the Incredible Pairs Wildcard Elimination match against Mikael Yamaha, Marcellus King, Jaxon Dane, and Kamakazi Kid. Converse's team won the match with he and Brass Munkey being the sole survivors. Converse was allowed a title shot at the heavyweight belt due to winning the event.

On January 2, 2010, Converse lost a Three Way Dance with Brass Munkey and the Kamakazi Kid for the CWF Mid-Atlantic Heavyweight Championship at Battlecade X. He also lost Brass Munkey at New Years Knockout on January 16 to decide the number-one contender for the CWF Championship. That summer, he won the 2010 Johnny Weaver Memorial Cup tournament defeating "High Definition" Steve Greene in the semi-finals and PWI International Ultra-J Crown Champion Xsiris in the finals on August 21, 2010.

=== Recent years (2011–) ===
On April 1, 2011, Converse was one of several CWF Mid-Atlantic stars to take part in an interpromotional show with Dragon Gate USA. He was originally scheduled to wrestle Shane "Hurricane" Helms in a qualifying match for the PWI International Heavyweight Championship, however, this was changed to an official title bout at the last minute, which Helms won. On August 20, he entered the 2011 Johnny Weaver Memorial Cup tournament but was eliminated by Arik Royal. At Ultimate Survivor IX on November 19, he was part of the semi-main event wrestling in a Wildcard Incredible Pairs 8-man elimination tag team match with Trevor Lee, "Arrogant" Aric Andrews, and Joe Black against CWF Mid Atlantic Heavyweight Champion Xsiris, Ben Tyler, Jason Miller, and Mikael Yamaha. Converse was the final man eliminated when he was pinned by Yamaha. On December 3, 2011, Converse (with William L. Cross) pinned Mikael Yamaha at CWF's Road to BattleCade in Burlington, North Carolina. Along with all his accomplishments, Converse is also credited for giving Robby "Whisker Biscuits" Walsh his start in professional wrestling.

== Championships and accomplishments ==
- Alternative Championship Wrestling
  - ACW Heavyweight Championship (1 time)
- AWA Superstars
  - AWA World Heavyweight Championship (1 time)
  - AWA World Tag Team Championship (1 time) – with Xsiris
- CWF Mid-Atlantic
  - CWF Mid-Atlantic Heavyweight Championship (6 times)
  - CWF Mid-Atlantic Tag Team Championships (1 time) - with Xsiris
  - CWF Mid-Atlantic Cruiserweight Championship (1 time)
  - Johnny Weaver Cup Tournament winner (2010)
- East Coast Professional Wrestling
  - ECPW Tag Team Championship (1 time) – with Lumbee Warrior
- New Empire Wrestling
  - NEW Regional Championship (1 time)
- National Wrestling Alliance Carolinas Pro Wrestling (NWA Carolinas)
  - NWA Carolinas Heavyweight Championship (1 time)
- Premier Wrestling Showcase
  - PWS Tag Team Championship (1 time) – with Marcellus King
- Ringside Championship Wrestling
  - RCW Heavyweight Championship (1 time)
- Pro Wrestling International
  - PWI International Heavyweight Championship (2 times)
- Pro Wrestling Illustrated
  - PWI ranked him #324 of the top 500 singles wrestlers in the PWI 500 in 2009.
- Southern Wrestling Alliance
  - SWA Cruiserweight Championship (1 time)
