= 1993 in professional wrestling =

1993 in professional wrestling describes the year's events in the world of professional wrestling.

== List of notable promotions ==
These promotions held notable events in 1993.

Promotion Name	Abbreviation
Asistencia Asesoría y Administración	AAA
All Japan Women's Pro-Wrestling	AJW
Catch Wrestling Association	CWA
Consejo Mundial de Lucha Libre	CMLL
Eastern Championship Wrestling	ECW
Frontier Martial-Arts Wrestling	FMW
New Japan Pro-Wrestling	NJPW
Universal Wrestling Association	UWA
World Championship Wrestling	WCW
World Wrestling Council	WWC
World Wrestling Federation	WWF

== Calendar of notable shows ==
=== January ===
Date	Promotion(s)	Event	Location	Main Event
January 4	NJPW	Fantastic Story in Tokyo Dome	Tokyo, Japan	Genichiro Tenryu defeated Riki Choshu in a Singles match
January 4	WCW NJPW	WCW/New Japan Supershow III	Tokyo, Japan	Sting defeated Hiroshi Hase in a Singles match
January 13	WCW	Clash of the Champions XXII	Milwaukee, Wisconsin, United States	Dustin Rhodes, Sting and Cactus Jack defeated Big Van Vader, Barry Windham and Paul Orndorff in a Thundercage match
January 23	ECW	Battle of the Belts	Philadelphia, Pennsylvania, United States	Terry Funk defeated Eddie Gilbert in a I Quit Texas Death Match
January 24	WWF	Royal Rumble	Sacramento, California, United States	Yokozuna won by last eliminating Randy Savage in a 30-man Royal Rumble match for a WWF World Heavyweight Championship match at WrestleMania IX
January 31	UWA	18th Anniversary	Naucalpan, Mexico	Vampiro defeated El Canek (c) in a Singles match for the UWA World Heavyweight Championship
(c) – denotes defending champion(s)

=== February ===
Date	Promotion(s)	Event	Location	Main Event
February 21	WCW	SuperBrawl III	Asheville, North Carolina, United States	Big Van Vader defeated Sting in a White Castle of Fear Strap match
(c) – denotes defending champion(s)

=== April ===
Date	Promotion(s)	Event	Location	Main Event
April 2	AJW	All-Star Dreamslam	Yokohama, Japan	AJW's Manami Toyota and Toshiyo Yamada defeat FMW's Megumi Kudo and Combat Toyoda in a tag team match
April 2	CMLL	37. Aniversario de Arena México	Mexico City, Mexico	Dr. Wagner Jr. defeated Pierroth Jr. (c) in a Best two-out-of-three falls match for the CMLL World Light Heavyweight Championship
April 2	NJPW / WAR	WAR vs. NJPW	Tokyo, Japan	Riki Choshu & Shinya Hashimoto defeated Genichiro Tenryu & Takashi Ishikawa in a tag team match
April 2	WWF	WrestleMania IX	Paradise, Nevada, United States	Hulk Hogan defeated Yokozuna (c) in a Singles match for the WWF Championship
April 11	AJW	All-Star Dreamslam 2	Osaka, Japan	JWP's Mayumi Ozaki and Dynamite Kansai defeat AJW's Manami Toyota and Toshiyo Yamada for the WWWA World Tag Team Championship
April 11	WWF	UK Rampage	Sheffield, England, United Kingdom	Lex Luger defeated Jim Duggan by disqualification in a Singles match
April 30	AAA	Triplemanía I	Mexico City, D.F., Mexico	Cien Caras defeated Konnan in a Best two-out-of-three falls retirement match
(c) – denotes defending champion(s)

=== May ===
Date	Promotion(s)	Event	Location	Main Event
May 3	NJPW	Wrestling Dontaku	Fukuoka, Japan	Antonio Inoki and Tatsumi Fujinami defeated Genichiro Tenryu and Riki Choshu via submission in a tag team match
May 5	FMW	4th Anniversary	Kawasaki, Kanagawa, Japan	Atsushi Onita defeated Terry Funk in a No Rope Exploding Barbed Wire Time Bomb Deathmatch
May 23	WCW	Slamboree	Atlanta, Georgia, United States	Davey Boy Smith defeated Big Van Vader (c) by disqualification in a Singles match for the WCW World Heavyweight Championship
(c) – denotes defending champion(s)

=== June ===
Date	Promotion(s)	Event	Location	Main Event
June 13	WWF	King of the Ring	Dayton, Ohio, United States	Bret Hart defeated Bam Bam Bigelow in a King of the Ring final match
June 16	WCW	Clash of the Champions XXIII	Norfolk, Virginia, United States	Ric Flair and Arn Anderson defeated The Hollywood Blonds (Brian Pillman and Steve Austin) (c) 2-0 by disqualification in a Two-out-of-three falls match for both the NWA and WCW World Tag Team Championships
June 19	ECW	Super Summer Sizzler Spectacular	Philadelphia, Pennsylvania, United States	"Hot Stuff" Eddie Gilbert defeated Terry Funk in a Texas chain match massacre for the title of "King of Philadelphia"
(c) – denotes defending champion(s)

=== July ===
Date	Promotion(s)	Event	Location	Main Event
July 18	WCW	Beach Blast	Biloxi, Mississippi, United States	Sting and Davey Boy Smith defeated The Masters of the Powerbomb (Big Van Vader and Sid Vicious) in a tag team match
(c) – denotes defending champion(s)

=== August ===
Date	Promotion(s)	Event	Location	Main Event
August 7	NJPW	G1 Climax	Tokyo, Japan	Hiroshi Hase defeated Tatsumi Fujinami in the finals
August 8	WWC	20th Aniversario		Carlos Colón defeated Terry Funk in a Singles match
August 18	WCW	Clash of the Champions XXIV	Daytona Beach, Florida, United States	Big Van Vader (c) defeated Davey Boy Smith in a Singles match for the WCW World Heavyweight Championship
August 22	FMW	Summer Spectacular	Nishinomiya, Hyōgo, Japan	Atsushi Onita defeated Mr. Pogo in a No Ropes Exploding Barbed Wire Time Bomb Cage Deathmatch for the vacant FMW Brass Knuckles Heavyweight Championship
August 25	AJW	Legacy of Queens	Tokyo, Japan	AJW's Aja Kong defeat JWP's Dynamite Kansai in a singles match
August 30	WWF	SummerSlam	Auburn Hills, Michigan, United States	Lex Luger defeated Yokozuna (c) by countout in a Singles match for the WWF Championship
(c) – denotes defending champion(s)

=== September ===
Date	Promotion(s)	Event	Location	Main Event	Notes
September 18	ECW	UltraClash	Philadelphia, Pennsylvania, United States	The Headhunters (Headhunter A and Headhunter B) defeated Miguelito Pérez and Crash the Terminator in a Baseball Bat match	
September 19	WCW	Fall Brawl	Houston, Texas, United States	Sting, Davey Boy Smith, Dustin Rhodes and The Shockmaster defeated Sid Vicious, Vader and Harlem Heat (Kole and Kane) in a WarGames match	
September 29	AJW/ LLPW	Nagoya Super Whirlwing	Nagoya, Japan	LLPW's Shinobu Kandori defeats AJW's Yumiko Hotta in a tag team match	
(c) – denotes defending champion(s)

=== October ===
Date	Promotion(s)	Event	Location	Main Event
October 1	CMLL	60th Anniversary	Mexico City, Mexico	Atlantis defeated Mano Negra in a Best two-out-of-three falls Lucha de Apuestas, mask vs. mask match
October 1	ECW	NWA Bloodfest	Philadelphia, Pennsylvania, United States	Terry Funk (c) defeated Jimmy Snuka by escaping the cage in a Steel cage match for the ECW Television Championship
October 9	AJW	Wrestlemarinepiad 1993	Tokyo, Japan	Aja Kong defeats Akira Hokuto in a singles match
October 23	AJPW	21st Anniversary Show	Tokyo, Japan	Mitsuharu Misawa defeated Stan Hansen to retain the Triple Crown Heavyweight Championship
October 24	WCW	Halloween Havoc	New Orleans, Louisiana, United States	Big Van Vader defeated Cactus Jack in a Texas Death match
(c) – denotes defending champion(s)

=== November ===
Date	Promotion(s)	Event	Location	Main Event
November 10	WCW	Clash of the Champions XXV	St. Petersburg, Florida, United States	Ric Flair defeated Vader (c) by disqualification in a Singles match for the WCW World Heavyweight Championship
November 12	ECW	Terror at Tabor	Philadelphia, Pennsylvania, United States	Tommy Dreamer defeated Johnny Grunge in a Singles match
November 13	ECW	November to Remember	Philadelphia, Pennsylvania, United States	Sabu (c - World Heavyweight) and Road Warrior Hawk defeated Terry Funk (c - World Television) and King Kong Bundy in a Winner Takes All match for the ECW Heavyweight Championship and the ECW Television Championship
November 20	WCW	Battlebowl	Pensacola, Florida, United States	Vader won the 16-man battle royal by lastly eliminating Sting
November 24	WWF	Survivor Series	Boston, Massachusetts, United States	The All-Americans (Lex Luger, The Steiner Brothers (Rick Steiner and Scott Steiner) and The Undertaker) defeated The Foreign Fanatics (Crush, Quebecer Jacques, Ludvig Borga and Yokozuna) in a 4-on-4 Survivor Series elimination match
November 28	AJW	Wrestling Queendom	Osaka, Japan	AJW's Yumiko Hotta and Takako Inoue defeat LLPW's Shinobu Kandori and Miki Handa in a tag team match
(c) – denotes defending champion(s)

=== December ===
Date	Promotion(s)	Event	Location	Main Event
December 6	AJW	St. Battle Final 1993	Tokyo, Japan	LLPW's Shinobu Kandori defeats AJW's Akira Hokuto in a singles match
December 8	FMW	Year End Spectacular	Tokyo, Japan	Atsushi Onita (c) defeated Mitsuhiro Matsunaga in a No Ropes Exploding Barbed Wire Deathmatch for the FMW Brass Knuckles Heavyweight Championship
December 18	CWA	Euro Catch Festival	Bremen, Germany	Rambo (c) defeated The Barbarian in Round 6 in a Singles match for the CWA World Heavyweight Championship
December 26	FMW	FMW/MPW	Tokyo, Japan	Atsushi Onita, Tarzan Goto and The Great Sasuke vs. Mr. Pogo, Jinsei Shinzaki and Masaru Toi in a Six-man tag team match
December 26	ECW	Holiday Hell	Philadelphia, Pennsylvania, United States	Tommy Dreamer won a battle royal
December 27	WCW	Starrcade	Charlotte, North Carolina, United States	Ric Flair defeated Vader (c) in a Title vs. Career match for the WCW World Heavyweight Championship
(c) – denotes defending champion(s)

== Accomplishments and tournaments ==
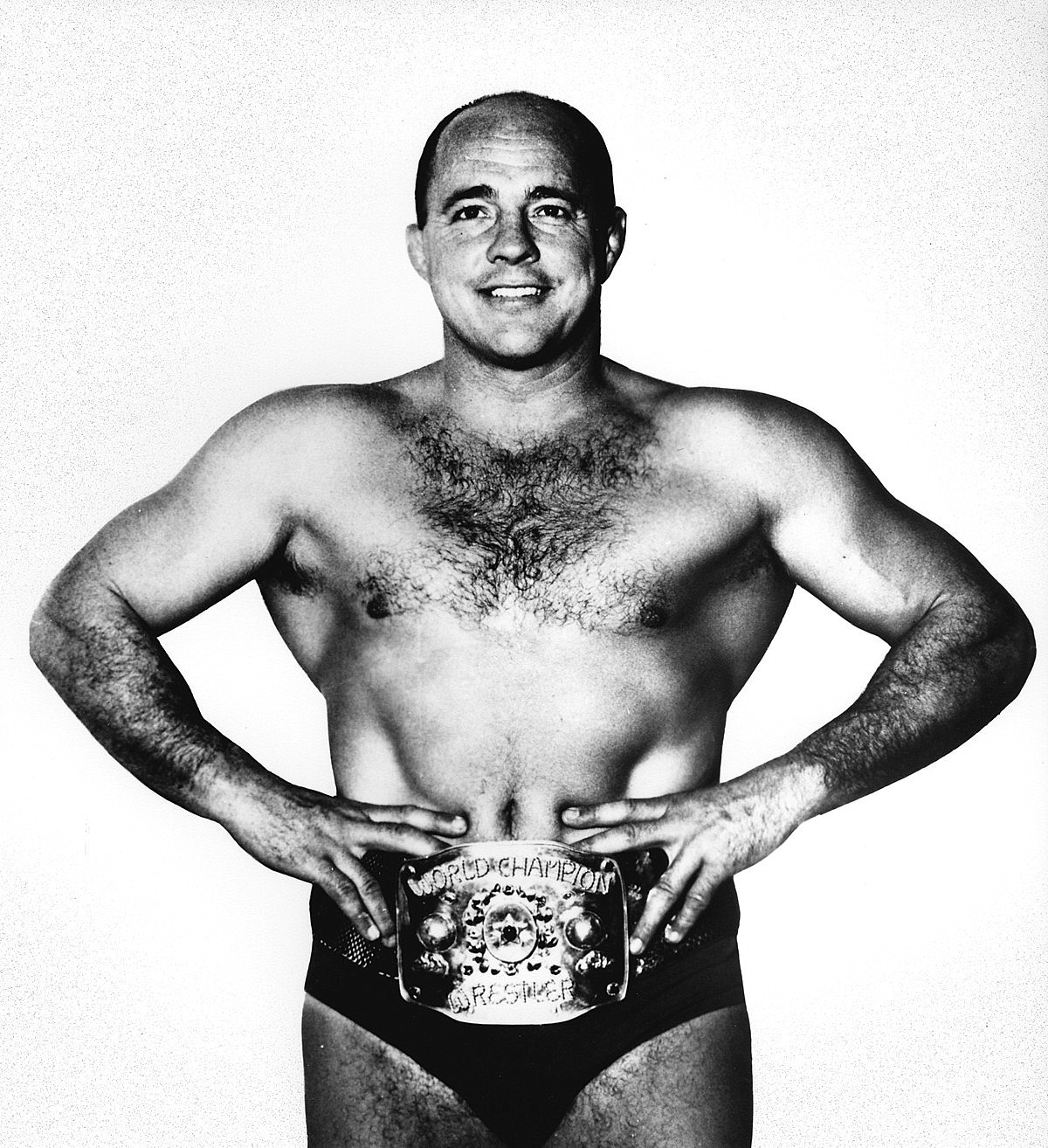
WCW Hall of Fame 1993 inductee, Verne Gagne

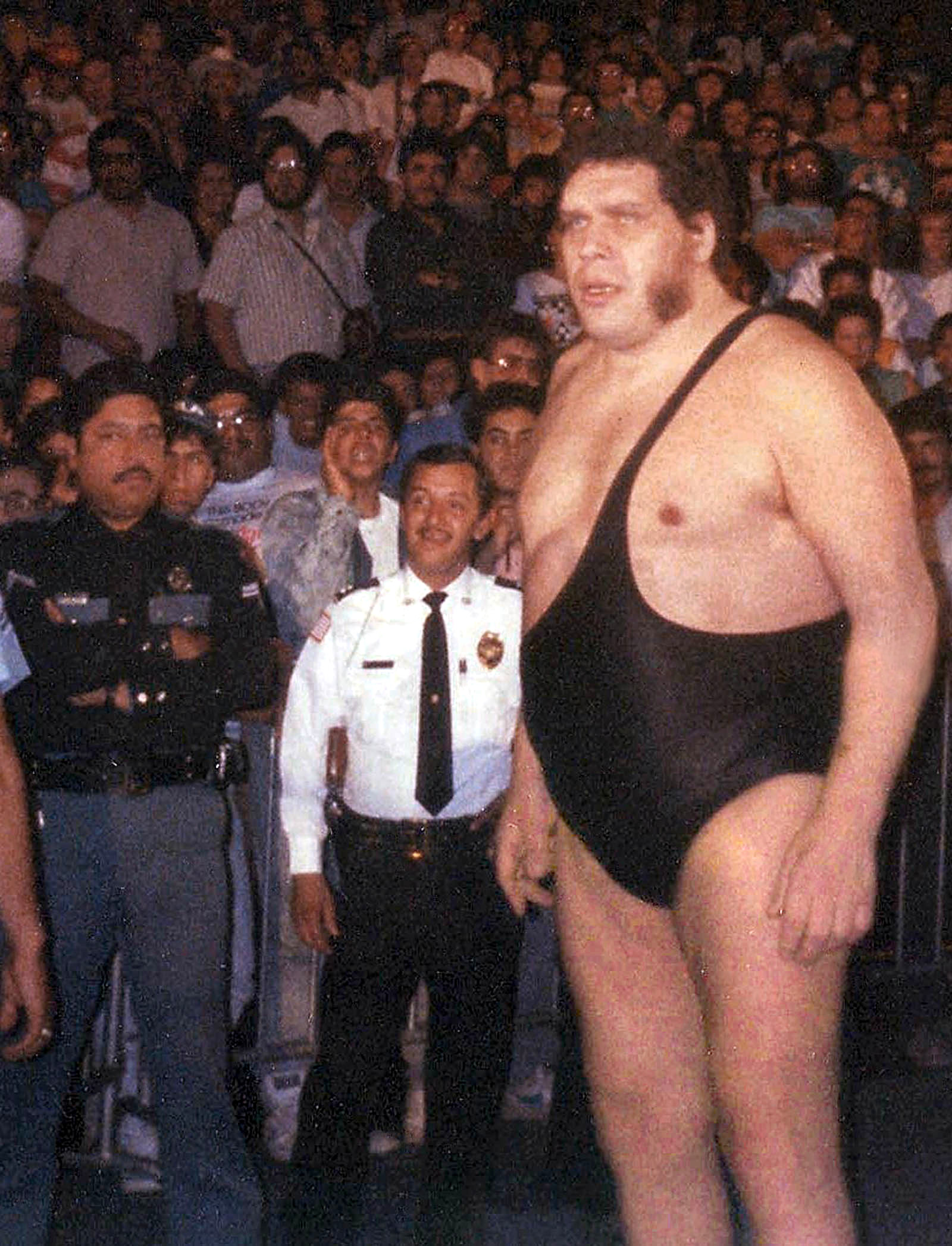
Inaugural WWF Hall of Fame sole inductee for 1993, André the Giant

=== AJW ===
Accomplishment	Winner	Date won	Notes
AJW Japan Grand Prix 1993	Akira Hokuto	August 21	
AJW Tag League The Best 1993	Akira Hokuto and Manami Toyota	December 10	

=== AJPW ===
Accomplishment	Winner	Date won	Notes
Champion Carnival 1993	Stan Hansen	April 21	
World's Strongest Determination League 1993	Kenta Kobashi and Mitsuharu Misawa	December 2	

=== ECW ===
Accomplishment	Winner	Date won	Notes
ECW Television Championship Tournament	Jimmy Snuka	March 12	
ECW Tag Team Championship Tournament	Eddie Gilbert and The Dark Patriot	August 8	

=== JWP ===
Accomplishment	Winner	Date won	Notes
Blue Star Cup 1993	Candy Okutsu		

=== WCW ===
Accomplishment	Winner	Date won	Notes
WCW United States Championship Tournament	Dustin Rhodes	January 11	
WCW World Television Championship Tournament	Paul Orndorff	March 2	

==== WCW Hall of Fame ====
Inductee
Lou Thesz
Verne Gagne
Mr. Wrestling II
Eddie Graham

=== WWF ===
Accomplishment	Winner	Date won	Notes
Royal Rumble	Yokozuna	January 24	
King of the Ring	Bret Hart	June 13	
WWF Women's Championship Tournament	Alundra Blayze	December 13	

==== WWF Hall of Fame ====
Category	Inductee	Inducted by	Notes
Individual	André the Giant	None	Inaugural inductee Sole inductee

== Awards and honors ==
=== Pro Wrestling Illustrated ===
Category	Winner
PWI Wrestler of the Year	Big Van Vader
PWI Tag Team of the Year	The Steiner Brothers (Rick and Scott Steiner)
PWI Match of the Year	Shawn Michaels vs. Marty Jannetty (Raw, July 19)
PWI Feud of the Year	Bret Hart vs. Jerry Lawler
PWI Most Popular Wrestler of the Year	Lex Luger
PWI Most Hated Wrestler of the Year	Jerry Lawler
PWI Comeback of the Year	Lex Luger
PWI Most Improved Wrestler of the Year	Yokozuna
PWI Most Inspirational Wrestler of the Year	Cactus Jack
PWI Rookie of the Year	Vampire Warrior
PWI Lifetime Achievement	André the Giant
PWI Editor's Award	Jim Cornette

=== Wrestling Observer Newsletter ===
Category	Winner
Wrestler of the Year	Big Van Vader
Most Outstanding	Kenta Kobashi
Feud of the Year	Bret Hart vs. Jerry Lawler
Tag Team of the Year	The Hollywood Blonds (Steve Austin and Brian Pillman)
Most Improved	Tracy Smothers
Best on Interviews	Jim Cornette

== Notable events ==
- January 9 - WWF Mania aired its first episode on the USA Network with host Todd Pettengill who's making his WWF TV Debut.
- January 11 - WWF Monday Night Raw premiered on the USA Network, its first episode was from the Manhattan Center in New York City
- February 10 - Bill Watts resigned as Executive Vice President of Wrestling Operations for WCW.
- February 12 – Eric Bischoff becomes Executive Producer of all World Championship Wrestling television and Ole Anderson was announced as new Vice President of Wrestling Operations for WCW.
- February 21 – Ric Flair makes his WCW return and Davey Boy Smith makes his WCW debut at WCW SuperBrawl III in Asheville, North Carolina
- February 22 – Hulk Hogan makes his WWF return live on Monday Night Raw.
- February 25 - Jim Ross resigned from WCW.
- April 2 - All Japan Women's Pro-Wrestling holds their All-Star Dreamslam event. The event featured multiple inter-promotional matches between AJW, FMW, Ladies Legend Pro-Wrestling and JWP Joshi Puroresu.
- April 4 – Jim Ross makes his WWF TV debut at WrestleMania IX
- April 6 - ECW Hardcore TV debuts on SportsChannel Philadelphia.
- April 11 - All Japan Women's Pro-Wrestling holds their All-Star Dreamslam 2 event. The event featured multiple inter-promotional matches between AJW, FMW, Ladies Legend Pro-Wrestling and JWP Joshi Puroresu and the return of Chigusa Nagayo from retirement.
- April 13 - WCW makes its New York City debut running a live event at the Paramount Theater in New York, NY headlined with Vader defending the WCW World Heavyweight title vs Sting in the main event drawing 3,000.
- July 7 – WCW Worldwide begins taping at Disney/MGM Studios from Orlando, Florida. This taping schedule ran from July 7–10 taping matches and footage for airing starting the weekend of August 28–29, 1993 which included Ric Flair and Rick Rude wearing the NWA World title, Ricky Steamboat and Lord Steven Regal wearing the WCW TV title and an interview with Paul Roma & Arn Anderson wearing the NWA & WCW world tag team titles and The Nasty Boys managed by Missy Hyatt carrying the NWA World Tag Team titles in the ring.
- September 1 – WCW leaves the National Wrestling Alliance
- September 3 - The NWA Convention was held in Las Vegas, NV, also that same day the ECW joined the NWA becoming NWA Eastern Championship Wrestling.
- October 6 - Mean Gene Okerlund made his WCW debut at a WCW Saturday Night taping in Atlanta, GA (air date November 5)
- October 27 - Both Sid Vicious and Arn Anderson was both hospitalized following a hotel room brawl which saw both wrestlers stabbing each other with a pair of Scissors after an argument at a hotel bar on WCW's tour of Europe.
- November 24 – For the first time ever a non - WWF title changed hands at a WWF pay-per-view when The Heavenly Bodies defeating SMW Tag Team Champions The Rock 'n' Roll Express in a title match at the Survivor Series in Boston, Massachusetts.
- November 30 - The Boss returns to WCW on a WCW Saturday Night taping in Atlanta, GA.
- December 4 – Bobby Heenan was given an on-air farewell on WWF Monday Night Raw when Gorilla Monsoon picked him up and threw him and his belongings out of the arena and onto the street.

== Title changes ==
=== ECW ===
ECW World Heavyweight Championship
Incoming champion – The Sandman
Date	Winner	Event/Show	Note(s)
April 3	Don Muraco	Hardcore TV	
August 8	Tito Santana	Hardcore TV	
September 9	Shane Douglas	Hardcore TV	
October 2	Sabu	NWA Bloodfest	
December 26	Terry Funk	Holiday Hell	

ECW World Television Championship
Incoming champion – Glen Osbourne
Date	Winner	Event/Show	Note(s)
February	Vacant	N/A	
March 12	Jimmy Snuka	Hardcore TV	
October 1	Terry Funk	NWA Bloodfest: Part 1	
November 13	Sabu	November to Remember	

ECW World Tag Team Championship
Incoming champions – The Super Destroyers (A. J. Petrucci and Doug Stahl)
Date	Winner	Event/Show	Note(s)
April 2	Tony Stetson and Larry Winters	Hardcore TV	
April 3	The Suicide Blondes (Chris Candido, Johnny Hotbody, and Chris Michaels)	Hardcore TV	
May 15	The Super Destroyers (A. J. Petrucci and Doug Stahl)	Hardcore TV	
May 15	The Suicide Blondes (Chris Candido, Johnny Hotbody, and Chris Michaels)	Hardcore TV	
July 15	Vacant	Hardcore TV	
August 8	The Dark Patriot and Eddie Gilbert	Hardcore TV	
October 1	Vacant	Bloodfest: Part 1	
October 1	Johnny Hotbody and Tony Stetson	Bloodfest: Part 1	
November 13	Tommy Dreamer and Johnny Gunn	November to Remember	
December 4	Kevin Sullivan and The Tazmaniac	Hardcore TV	

ECW Maryland Championship
(Title created)
Date	Winner	Event/Show	Note(s)
October 16	J.T. Smith	N/A	Won a battle royal.

ECW Pennsylvania Championship
(Title created)
Date	Winner	Event/Show	Note(s)
May 14	Tommy Cairo	ECW Hardcore TV	Cairo won a battle royal to become the inaugural champion. Aired on June 8.
August 7	Tony Stetson	ECW Hardcore TV	Aired on September 14.
September 18	Deactivated	UltraClash	The championship is abandoned.

=== NJPW ===
IWGP Heavyweight Championship
Incoming champion – The Great Muta
Date	Winner	Event/Show	Note(s)
September 20	Shinya Hashimoto	G1 Climax Special 1993	

IWGP Tag Team Championship
Incoming champions – The Hell Raisers (Hawk Warrior and Power Warrior)
Date	Winner	Event/Show	Note(s)
August 5	The Jurassic Powers (Hercules Hernandez and Scott Norton)	G1 Climax 1993	

IWGP Junior Heavyweight Championship
Incoming champion – Último Dragón
Date	Winner	Event/Show	Note(s)
January 4	Jushin Thunder Liger	Fantastic Story in Tokyo Dome	

=== FMW ===
FMW Brass Knuckles Heavyweight Championship
Incoming champion – Atsushi Onita
Date	Winner	Event/Show	Note(s)
August 22	Atsushi Onita	Summer Spectacular	

FMW Independent World Junior Heavyweight Championship
(Title created)
Date	Winner	Event/Show	Note(s)
October 28	The Great Sasuke	House show	

=== WCW ===
WCW World Heavyweight Championship
Incoming champion – Big Van Vader
Date	Winner	Event/Show	Note(s)
March 11	Sting	House show	
March 17	Big Van Vader	House show	
December 27	Ric Flair	Starrcade	

NWA World Heavyweight Championship / WCW International World Heavyweight Championship
Incoming champion – Masa Chono
Date	Winner	Event/Show	Note(s)
January 4	The Great Muta	WCW/New Japan Supershow III	
February 21	Barry Windham	SuperBrawl III	
July 18	Ric Flair	Beach Blast	On September 1, 1993, WCW withdrew from the National Wrestling Alliance. WCW continues to recognize Flair as the "WCW International World Champion".
September 19	Rick Rude	Fall Brawl	

WCW United States Heavyweight Championship
Incoming champion – Vacant
Date	Winner	Event/Show	Note(s)
January 11	Dustin Rhodes	Saturday Night	Aired on tape delay on January 16.
May 1	Vacant	WorldWide	
August 30	Dustin Rhodes	Saturday Night	Aired on tape delay on September 4.
December 27	Steve Austin	Starrcade	

WCW World Television Championship
Incoming champion – Vacant
Date	Winner	Event/Show	Note(s)
March 2	Paul Orndorff	WorldWide	Aired on tape delay on April 3
August 18	Ricky Steamboat	Clash of the Champions XXIV	
September 19	Lord Steven Regal	Fall Brawl	

WCW World Tag Team Championship
Incoming champions – Ricky Steamboat and Shane Douglas
Date	Winner	Event/Show	Note(s)
March 2	The Hollywood Blonds (Steve Austin and Brian Pillman)	WorldWide	Aired on tape delay on March 27.
August 18	Arn Anderson and Paul Roma	Clash of the Champions XXIV	Also held the NWA World Tag Team Championship until September 1 when WCW withdrew from the National Wrestling Alliance
September 19	The Nasty Boys (Brian Knobbs and Jerry Sags)	Fall Brawl	
October 4	Marcus Alexander Bagwell and 2 Cold Scorpio	Saturday Night	Aired on tape delay on October 23.
October 24	The Nasty Boys (Brian Knobbs and Jerry Sags)	Halloween Havoc	

=== WWF ===
WWF World Heavyweight Championship
Incoming champion – Bret Hart
Date	Winner	Event/Show	Note(s)
April 4	Yokozuna	WrestleMania IX	
April 4	Hulk Hogan	WrestleMania IX	
June 13	Yokozuna	King of the Ring	

WWF Intercontinental Championship
Incoming champion – Shawn Michaels
Date	Winner	Event/Show	Note(s)
May 17	Marty Jannetty	Raw	
June 6	Shawn Michaels	House show	
September 27	Vacant	N/A	
September 27	Razor Ramon	Raw	

WWF Women's Championship
(Title reactivated)
Date	Winner	Event/Show	Note(s)
December 13	Alundra Blayze	All American Wrestling	

WWF Tag Team Championship
Incoming champions – Money Inc. (Ted DiBiase and Irwin R. Schyster)
Date	Winner	Event/Show	Note(s)
June 14	The Steiner Brothers (Rick and Scott Steiner)	House show	
June 16	Money Inc. (Ted DiBiase and Irwin R. Schyster)	House show	
June 19	The Steiner Brothers (Rick and Scott Steiner)	House show	
September 13	The Quebecers (Pierre and Jacques)	Raw	

== Births ==
- January 7 – Darby Allin
- January 31 – Emersyn Jayne
- February 17 – Magnus, Mexican luchador
- February 19 – Mayu Iwatani
- March 4:
  - James Drake
  - Teoman
- March 5 – Josh Briggs
- March 9 – So Daimonji
- March 17 - Solo Sikoa
- March 26 – Nico Angelo
- March 29 – Stephanie Vaquer
- April 29 – Myla Grace
- May 5 – Saki Kashima
- May 7 – Will Ospreay
- May 16 - David Finlay (wrestler)
- May 20 – Akam, Canadian wrestler
- May 27 – Charles Mason
- June 10 - Queen Aminata
- June 14 – Esfinge, Mexican luchador
- July 2 - Kamille (wrestler)
- July 13 – Mahiro Kiryu
- July 28:
  - Noam Dar, Israeli wrestler
  - Sammy Guevara
- August 4 – Henare, New Zealand wrestler
- August 12 – El Soberano, Mexican luchador
- September 8 – Yota Tsuji, Japanese wrestler
- September 9
  - Sarah Logan, American female wrestler
  - Lexis King
- September 23 – U-T Japanese wrestler
- September 24 – Sonya Deville, American female wrestler
- September 30 – Trevor Lee, American wrestler
- October 6 - Clark Connors
- October 9 – La Estrella, Japanese wrestler
- October 10 – Ilja Dragunov
- October 23 – 1 Called Manders
- November 6 – Bárbaro Cavernario, Mexican luchador
- November 9 – Pete Dunne
- December 11 – Sonny Kiss
- December 28 - Harley Cameron
- Unknown
  - Gran Guerrero, Mexican luchador
  - David Benoit, Canadian-American wrestler and son of Chris Benoit

== Debuts ==
=== Debut date ===
- January 20 - Tsubo Genjin and Magnitude Kishiwada
- February 13 - Hayato Nanjo
- March 18 - Tetsuhiro Kuroda
- May 2 - Azteca
- October - Doug Williams
- October 2 - El Zorro
- October 28 - Kamikaze and Super Rider
- October 29 - Katsumi Usuda
- November 12 - Yumi Fukawa
- November 27 - Toscano
- December 2 - C. W. Anderson
- December 5 - Daisuke Ikeda and Funaki
- December 8 - Joe Líder
- December 13 – Tsubasa

=== Uncertain debut date ===
- Jeff Bradley
- Tom Howard
- Nelson Frazier, Jr.
- Joey Styles
- Doug Basham
- Tammy Sytch
- Sgt. Craig Pittman
- Johnny Swinger
- Carl Malenko
- The Spellbinder

== Retirements ==
- Al Madril (1970–1993)
- Aníbal (November 1963 – 1993)
- Shirley Crabtree (1952–1993)
- Big John Studd (1972-1993)
- Bill Watts (1962–1993)
- Bobo Brazil (1951–1993)
- Debbie Malenko (1990-1993) (wrestled matches in 2001 and 2017, returned full time in 2021)
- Dick Beyer (December 29, 1954 – July 29, 1993)
- Frank Hickey (1935-May 15, 1993)
- Oliver Humperdink (1965–1993)
- Omar Atlas (1958–1993)
- Fred Peloquin (1971–1993)
- Rita Chatterton (1984–1993)

== Deaths ==
- January 8 - Toshimitsu Naoi, Japanese wrestler (b. 1966)
- January 27 - André the Giant, French wrestler (b. 1946)
- January 31 - Joe McHugh, WWWF announcer (b. 1904)
- February 18 - Kerry Von Erich, American wrestler (b. 1960)
- March 10 - Dino Bravo, Canadian wrestler (b. 1948)
- March 25 - Wally Karbo, American wrestling promoter (b. 1915)
- April 18 - Masahiko Kimura, Japanese wrestler (b. 1917)
- April 22 - Chief Big Heart, American wrestler (b. 1927)
- May 25 - D.J. Peterson, American wrestler (b. 1959)
- June 7 - Don Kent, American wrestler (b. 1933)
- July 19 - Bruno Elrington, British wrestler (b. 1929)
- October 13 - Espectro, Mexican luchador (b. 1934)
- October 26 - Oro, Mexican luchador (b. 1971)
- November 1 - Pinkie George (b. 1905)
- November 13 - Rufus R. Jones, American wrestler (b. 1933)
- December 8 - Frank Hickey, American wrestler (b. 1915)
- December 10 - Hurcan Castillo, Puerto Rican wrestler (b. unknown)
- December 13 - Larry Cameron, American wrestler (b. 1952)

== See also ==
- List of WCW pay-per-view events
- List of WWF pay-per-view events
- List of ECW supercards and pay-per-view events
- List of FMW supercards and pay-per-view events
