= Frank Hickey =

Frank Hickey may refer to:

- Frank Hickey (Canadian football)
- Frank Hickey (wrestler)
- J. Frank Hickey, American child molester and serial killer
