= Adam Windsor =

English professional wrestler

Personal information
- Born: Adam Bryniarski; January 17, 1981 Coventry, England
- Died: April 21, 2022 (aged 41)
- Spouse: Jade Adams ()
- Children: 3
- Website: AdamWindsor.com

Professional wrestling career
- Ring name: Adam Windsor
- Billed height: 6 ft 0 in (183 cm)
- Billed weight: 210 lb (95 kg)
- Trained by: Dory Funk Jr.
- Debut: July 2000
- Retired: 2014

Adam Bryniarski (January 17, 1981 – April 21, 2022) was an English professional wrestler, known by his ring name Adam Windsor, who worked in Dory Funk Jr's Funking Conservatory in Florida, World Xtreme Wrestling, and American independent promotions.

== Career ==
Windsor went to the United States in 1999 and was trained by former NWA Champion Dory Funk Jr. in Florida at the Funking Conservatory. He was also involved behind the scenes as an on-air commentator, writing promotional and advertising material, and video editor for Funk's !BANG! television show.

Then Windsor made his professional wrestling in 2000 for NWA Florida with Funk as his manager. During his rookie year on August 15, he defeated Chris Nelson in the tournament finals for the vacant NWA Florida Heavyweight Championship. On September 19, 2000, he defeated his teacher Dory Funk Jr. to retain the title. He would vacate the title in November 2000.

In November 2001, Windsor worked a few house shows for the World Wrestling Federation.

Windsor and Dory Funk Jr. wrestled in a dark match for NWA Total Non-stop Action defeating Homicide and Kory Chavis on November 27, 2002.

From 2002 to 2003, Windsor worked for NWA Wildside.

On January 29, 2005, Windsor lost to Lanny Poffo at WrestleReunion in Tampa, Florida. Windsor was managed by Dory Funk. Windsor lost to his teacher, Funk in a Texas Death match at Funking Conservatory on February 5, 2005. Windsor would go into early retirement that year.

In 2010, Windsor returned to wrestling teaming with English wrestler Neil Faith as the European Union where they joined WXW defeating tag team champions Hatchet City All-Stars to become the WXW Tag Team Champions. The European Union were listed in the top 5 Tag Teams in the state of Florida in polls ran by wrestling911.com and marcuspitts.com, they were listed in the top 5 tag teams for NWA Florida/NWA Fusion as well.

On 11 September 2010. The European Union defeated Los Ben Dejo's for the Vintage Wrestling Tag Team titles in a 2 out of 3 falls match. Faith was also listed as a trainer at the Hard Knocks Wrestling Academy in Daytona Beach, Florida.

In 2011, Windsor left Florida and returned to England continuing to wrestle until retiring in 2014.

== Personal life and death ==
Windsor was married to Chris Adams's and Lady Blossom's daughter Jade. Jade's step-father and later adoptive father is Stone Cold Steve Austin. They had three children.

Windsor died on April 21, 2022, from heart issues. He was 41.

== Championships and accomplishments ==
- Funking Conservatory
  - Funking Conservatory Heavyweight Championship (2 times)
  - Funking Conservatory International Heavyweight Championship (1 time)
  - Funking Conservatory Television Championship (4 times)
  - Funking Conservatory Hardcore Championship (1 time)
  - Funking Conservatory Tag Team Championship (5 times) – with Paul London (1), Neil Faith (1) Osamu Nishimura (1) David Flair (1) and Steve Corino (1)
- NWA Florida
  - NWA Florida Heavyweight Championship (1 time)
  - NWA North Florida Heavyweight Championship (1 time)
- Pro Wrestling Illustrated
  - PWI ranked him # 301 of the 500 best singles wrestlers of the PWI 500 in 2003
  - PWI ranked him # 326 of the 500 best singles wrestlers of the PWI 500 in 2004
  - PWI ranked him # 392 of the 500 best singles wrestlers of the PWI 500 in 2011
- Southern Wrestling Federation
  - SWF Tag Team Championship (1 time) – with Neil Faith
- Vintage Wrestling
  - Vintage Wrestling Tag Team Championship (1 time) – with Neil Faith
- World Xtreme Wrestling
  - WXW Tag Team Championship (1 time) – with Neil Faith
