= Gino Hernandez =

American professional wrestler

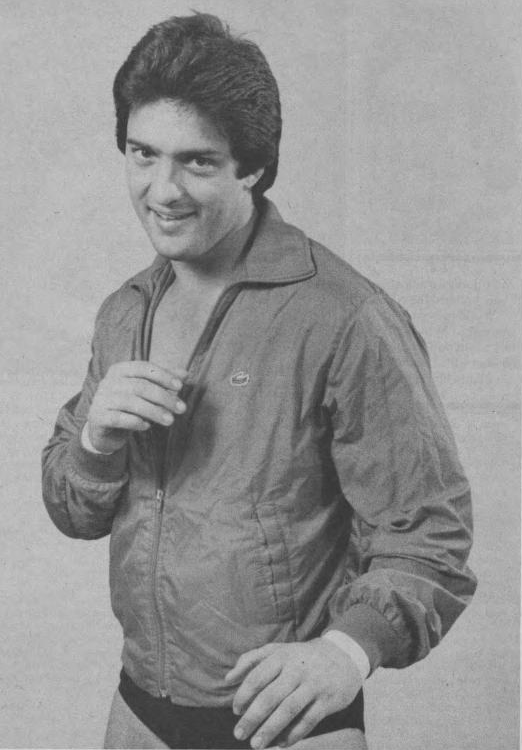
- Hernandez, c. 1984

Personal information
- Born: Charles Eugene Wolfe Jr. August 8, 1957 Highland Park, Texas, U.S.
- Died: February 2, 1986 (aged 28) Highland Park, Texas, U.S.
- Cause of death: Cocaine intoxication
- Spouses: Janice Marie Bancroft (m. 1976–1977) (m. 1978–1979)

Professional wrestling career
- Ring name: Gino Hernandez
- Billed height: 6 ft 1 in (185 cm)
- Billed weight: 238 lb (108 kg)
- Billed from: Highland Park, Texas
- Trained by: José Lothario
- Debut: 1975

Charles Eugene Wolfe Jr. (August 8, 1957 – February 2, 1986) was an American professional wrestler, better known by his ring name, Gino Hernandez. He is perhaps best known for his appearances with the Dallas, Texas-based promotion World Class Championship Wrestling (WCCW) between 1976 until his death in 1986. Hernandez's death was initially ruled a murder case, but police later concluded that he had died of a drug overdose. Despite this conclusion, those close to Hernandez and fans alike continue to speculate about the circumstances surrounding his death.

== Professional wrestling career ==
=== Early career ===
As a rookie, babyface wrestler in Ed Farhat's Big Time Wrestling promotion in Detroit, "Gino Hernandez" was a very young, fresh-faced performer who got over with female fans due to his long black hair, and good looks. He won Big Time's top title (its version of the NWA United States Heavyweight Championship) by defeating "Bulldog" Don Kent. During this time, Wolfe also wrestled at least one match for WWE forerunner the World Wide Wrestling Federation (WWWF). Gino lost the (Detroit) U.S. Title to his real-life boss: The Sheik (Big Time Wrestling owner and booker Eddie Farhat's 'Psycho-Arab' heel persona).

=== Southwest Championship Wrestling ===
Gino Hernandez —nicknamed "The Handsome Halfbreed"—started wrestling in 1975 in the San Antonio, Texas wrestling territory, Southwest Championship Wrestling (SCW), after being trained by Jose Lothario. He was initially in a tag-team with Lothario, then turned into a singles act via a "protege vs. mentor" storyline. The storyline feud with Lothario culminated in a "hair vs. hair match", which Hernandez lost—having his head shaved in the ring, as a result.

=== World Class Championship Wrestling ===
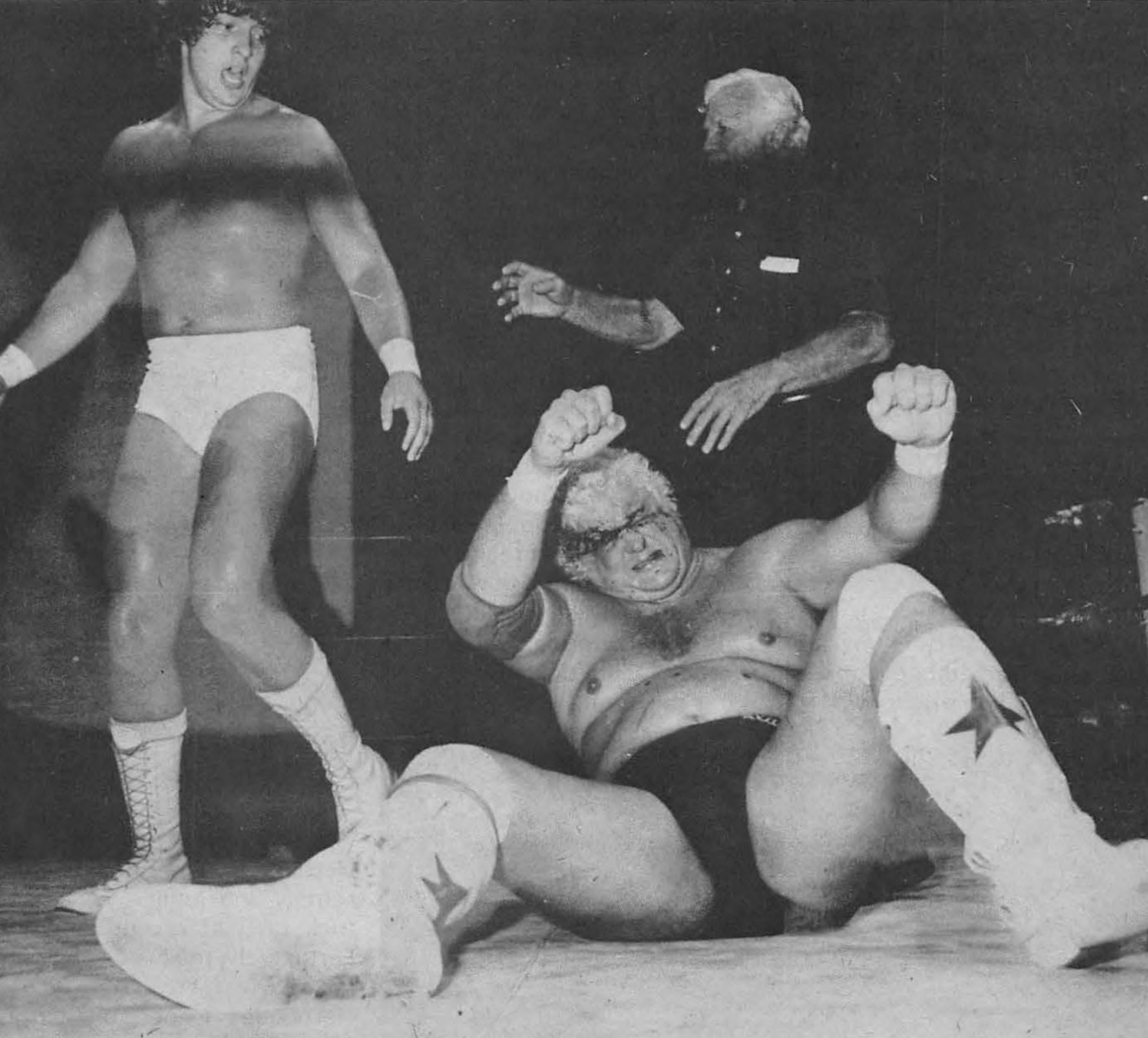
Hernandez (left) in a match against Dusty Rhodes, c. 1978

In the late-1970s and early-1980s, Gino worked for Dallas-based territory, World Class Championship Wrestling (WCCW) (called NWA Big Time Wrestling, at the time). The highlight was a storyline feud with David Von Erich over the NWA Texas Heavyweight Championship, which Gino won and lost back to David. Gino returned to SCW, forming a hugely popular tag-team ("The Dynamic Duo") with the territory owner's son, Tully Blanchard. Hernandez and Blanchard's tag-team act became so successful that they were the top (based on box office drawing power) heels in the state of Texas—regardless of territory.

=== Mid-South Wrestling ===
In 1982, Gino instigated a storyline feud with Chavo Guerrero by hitting him over the head with a beer bottle, and later insulting the Guerrero family name. This short-lived feud played out across multiple Texas territories.

=== Return to WCCW ===
Gino returned to WCCW in 1984, at different times individually or collectively feuding with the Von Erichs: Mike, Kevin and Kerry Von Erich. That summer, Gino was paired with Nickla Roberts, who was billed Andrea the Lady Giant (a'la Andre the Giant). The duo worked a series of mixed tag team matches against Sunshine and Mike Von Erich. Even Sunshine's aunt, Stella Mae French, was involved. Gino was put in a tag team with WCCW newcomer Jake "The Snake" Roberts in August 1984. Gino also formed a tag-team with Chris Adams; WCCW called them "The Dynamic Duo", as SCW had Gino and Tully. This WCCW version proved the more famous, as Adams and Hernandez drew high revenues and television ratings for World Class in their feud with the Von Erichs. The duo invented the famed gold scissors gimmick: snipping hair from the heads of their incapacitated opponents right after defeating them (a humiliation tactic meant to increase fans' anger toward the heels, increasing the heels' TV/live show drawing power). This gimmick was later used in the WWF by Brutus Beefcake.

Adams and Hernandez lost a "hair" match to Kevin and Kerry Von Erich at a Cotton Bowl show on October 6, 1985. After the match, Hernandez attempted to escape, but was tackled by Chris Von Erich, who was at ringside, and eventually had his hair shaved bald. His hair quickly grew back in two months, while Adams' hair took longer. With the Von Erichs storyline completed but the momentum from it still red-hot with fans, Gino was next booked to turn on Adams in December 1985. WCCW management intended this new feud to become its top storyline throughout 1986. On January 26, 1986, during a grudge match in Fort Worth, Hernandez threw "freebird hair cream" (a "hair-removal product" previously established in WCCW storyline continuity in 1983 by Freebird Buddy Roberts) into Adams' face, rendering Adams blind (in reality, Adams was returning to his native England to spend time with his new wife Toni, and his family; however, WCCW told Adams he had to continue to "sell" the blindness whenever out in public). Hernandez was scheduled to perform on a house show the following Thursday, and on a non-televised show at Dallas' Sportatorium the following Friday. After Gino no-showed both events, WCCW management's phone calls to him went unanswered.

== Personal life ==
His mother was Patrice Aguirre and his father was Charles Eugene Wolfe Sr., with the latter's identity being unknown to the point that wrestling fans speculated that Wolfe's father was actually Houston Wrestling promoter Paul Boesch, due to how close they were. Wolfe adopted the Gino Hernandez name after his stepfather, Luis Hernandez, who trained with him when Gino was a child.

Wolfe was married twice, both times to Janice Marie Bancroft. They were first married on April 10, 1976 in Harris County, Texas, before divorcing soon after on January 27, 1977. During their first marriage, they had a daughter, Lisa Marie, named after Lisa Marie Presley. A second daughter followed, Tasha. The pair remarried on April 12, 1978 before divorcing again on July 19, 1979.

== Death ==
On February 4, 1986, concerned with Wolfe's well-being, two WCCW officials (David Manning and Rick Hazzard) and several local police officers broke into his Highland Park, Texas condo, discovering Wolfe's decomposing corpse. He had been dead for approximately three to four days. Initially, Wolfe's death was ruled a homicide case; but following autopsy reports, his death was ruled the result of a cocaine overdose (Allegedly).

Wolfe's drug abuse (e.g., alcohol and cocaine, among others) was no secret to many World Class mainstays, including onscreen manager/one-time booker Gary Hart, who claimed to have repeatedly encouraged Wolfe to "get clean". The syndicated World Class TV episode scheduled to air the weekend of February 15, 1986 originally included a Gino Hernandez match taped on January 24 at the Dallas Sportatorium. This match never aired; instead, show announcer Bill Mercer gave an on-camera announcement of Gino's death, and a different match aired in its place. Both Mercer and Marc Lowrance treated Hernandez's death as well as Chris Adams' blinding angle as equally significant during a time when World Class was about to go forward with their feud beginning at Texas Stadium. Adams returned the following May, and won the World Class Heavyweight Championship two months later. The funeral service and its expenses were handled by a reputed local drug dealer/trafficker called John Royal, with whom Hernandez had become friends. Family members were uncomfortable with Royal and his associates overseeing the funeral proceedings; many had never heard of or met them prior to Wolfe's death.

=== Skepticism ===
Although police dropped the homicide investigation into Hernandez's death, some still believe he was murdered in a drug-related incident. According to David Manning, Hernandez had five times the amount of cocaine in his system that would have resulted in a fatality, and he and Kevin Von Erich stated that Hernandez also had cocaine in his stomach. Manning also suspected foul play due to the fact that Hernandez's dead bolt on his door was not locked, as he made it a habit in the past to lock the dead bolt at all times. In the weeks before his death, Hernandez had expressed to Manning and others the belief that his life was under threat.

Former rival Michael Hayes said in a 2016 interview: "I have a real, real hard time believing that Gino Hernandez OD'd... he was most definitely hanging with the wrong crowd, and either ran his mouth too much, or knew too much, or all of the above." Asked about Hernandez's death, Jake Roberts said: "Gino was attached to some heavy people... he was running in some pretty big circles, man, that maybe he didn't belong [in]." Hernandez's mother Patrice Aguirre and ex-wife Janice Marie Bancroft expressed the belief that he was probably murdered; Aguirre reported that criminal Jon Royal had told her of debts owed to him by Hernandez. She later received a recorded message from a gangland source who was close to Hernandez, claiming that her son was not murdered.

Both Aguirre and Bancroft have explored the possibility that Hernandez faked his death, given that he had once talked about doing so, and because the autopsy report was replete with errors about his ethnicity and physicality. The family never saw his body, which was concealed by Hernandez's manager Walter Ayman due to its decomposed state, and honored in a closed-casket service. Wrestler Brutus Beefcake has rejected the murder theory, saying that Hernandez "had a serious drug problem" and was an "intense, crazy partier". Jeanie Clarke spoke about Hernandez's mental state in the weeks leading up to his death in her autobiography, describing an incident where he virtually held her hostage (including brandishing a gun) as he fell into a deeply paranoid episode following a night partying and binging on cocaine. Hernandez was embarrassed and apologetic afterwards, and Clarke expressed concern for the intensity of his drug use. A documentary on Viceland TV, part of the Dark Side of the Ring series, called "The Mysterious Death of Gorgeous Gino", aired on May 8, 2019.

== Championships and accomplishments ==
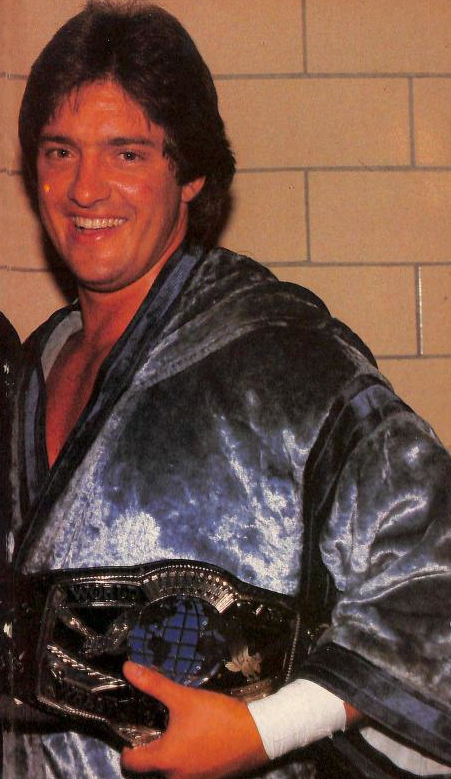
Hernandez as WCWA World Tag Team Champion, c. 1985.

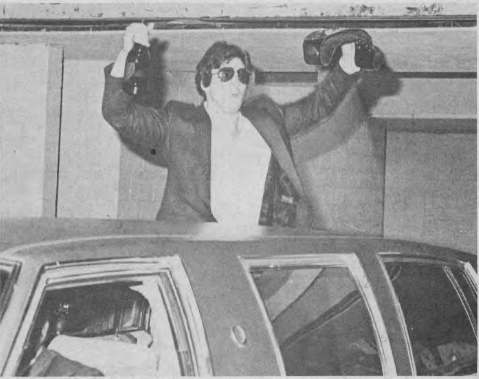
Hernandez as NWA International Junior Heavyweight Champion, c. 1981

- Big Time Wrestling
  - NWA United States Heavyweight Championship (Detroit version) (1 time)
- NWA Big Time Wrestling / World Class Championship Wrestling
  - NWA American Heavyweight Championship (4 times)
  - NWA American Tag Team Championship (5 times) – with El Gran Markus (2 times), Gary Young (1 time), and Chris Adams (2 times)
  - NWA Brass Knuckles Championship (1 time)
  - NWA International Junior Heavyweight Championship (1 time)
  - NWA Texas Heavyweight Championship (6 times)
  - NWA Texas Tag Team Championship (3 times) – with Jimmy Snuka (1 time), Pak Song (1 time), and Bruiser Brody (1 time)
  - NWA World Six-Man Tag Team Championship (Texas version) (1 time) – with Chris Adams and Jake Roberts
  - NWA Texas Heavyweight Championship Tournament (1984)
- Pro Wrestling Illustrated
  - Ranked #162 of the top 500 singles wrestlers of the "PWI Years" in 2003
  - Ranked #65 of the top 100 tag teams of the "PWI Years" with Chris Adams in 2003
- Southwest Championship Wrestling
  - SCW Southwest Tag Team Championship (5 times) – with Tully Blanchard
  - SCW World Tag Team Championship (2 times) – with Tully Blanchard

== See also ==
- List of premature professional wrestling deaths
