= Neil Faith =

British professional wrestler

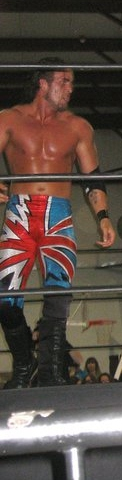
- Faith in 2010

Personal information
- Born: Neil Andrew Horsfall; 29 April 1981 (age 45) Colchester, Essex, England

Professional wrestling career
- Ring name(s): Lord Neil Faith; Neil Faith; The Whitechapel Ripper
- Billed height: 6 ft 5 in (1.96 m)
- Billed weight: 268 lb (122 kg)
- Billed from: Whitechapel, England
- Trained by: Bruce Hart; Andre Baker; New Japan Dojo
- Debut: 1999

Neil Andrew Horsfall (born 29 April 1981), better known by the ring name Neil Faith, is an English professional wrestler.

== Early life ==
Faith was born in Colchester, Essex. He was raised in London and Burnham-on-Crouch, Essex. He also attended the Thomas Adams School in Wem, Shropshire. He played football and rugby in high school. He studied kickboxing and was also a submission wrestler, competing in numerous shoot wrestling tournaments.

== Professional wrestling career ==
In April 1999, Faith started training for professional wrestling in England at the Hammerlock Wrestling Academy. After leaving the Hammerlock Wrestling Academy he traveled to Florida to wrestle for BANG TV on Fox, Then in January 2002 he moved to Calgary, Alberta, Canada to train with the Hart family.

Faith made his Stampede Wrestling debut in 02.22.2002 beating "Highlander" Rob Roy with a spinning tombstone piledriver. He then went on to team with fellow British wrestler Rick Vain to feud with Bruce and Teddy Hart in tag team matches. After departing from Stampede Wrestling in April 2002, he traveled to Japan to train in the New Japan Dojo in Tokyo.

Faith returned to Europe where he wrestled on independent wrestling shows. In 2002 he wrestled P. N. News in Dublin, Ireland at the national basketball arena. In 2002 he continued to wrestle all over Europe where he filmed a documentary called Ultimate Warriors on The Bravo Channel and appeared regularly on The Wrestling Channel on SKY TV.

Faith returned to Florida to wrestle for Dory Funk Jr.'s BANG TV show on Fox and Throwdown on The Brighthouse network.

After leaving BANG TV He returned again to Europe where he Worked tours for NWA - UK and made it to the Semi-Finals of The NWA-UK 2003 King of the Ring tournament.

From 2003 to 2004, he wrestled all over Europe, In countries such as Germany, Ireland, Russia, Holland, Scotland, Wales and England. He wrestled his last match in Europe on 05.02.2005 appearing for Revolution British Wrestling in London.

In June 2005, he permanently moved to the United States where he began working for Southern Championship Wrestling and World Xtreme Wrestling's Rage TV, which airs on the brighthouse network in Central Florida and is owned and operated by WWE Hall of Famer Afa the Wild Samoan.

In October 2008, Faith had several WWE tryouts in Tampa, Florida. At Vintage Wrestling's first show, "Ignition", held in 2009 in Sanford, Florida, he wrestled in the main event against Jake "The Snake" Roberts. In December 2009, he started a tag team with Adam Windsor called European Union. Quickly after joining WXW they defeated tag team champions Hatchet City All-Stars to become the WXW Tag Team Champions.

As of July 2010, The European Union are regularly listed in the top 5 Tag Teams in the state of Florida in polls ran by wrestling911.com and marcuspitts.com, they are also currently listed in the top 5 tag teams for NWA Florida/NWA Fusion as well. In 2010, Faith was also ranked #4 in the top 50 wrestlers in Florida poll by www.marcuspitt.com and www.wrestling911.com. He was also rated #8 in the top ten most hated wrestlers in Florida list in January 2011.

On 11 September 2010. The European Union defeated Los Ben Dejo's for the Vintage Wrestling Tag Team titles in a 2 out of 3 falls match. Faith was also listed as a trainer at the Hard Knocks Wrestling Academy in Daytona Beach, Florida.

== Personal life ==
Faith married his current wife in 2005. They have two children.

== Championships and accomplishments ==
- !Bang!
  - BANG International Championship (1 time)
  - BANG TV European Championship (1 time)
  - BANG TV Tag Team Championship (1 time) - with Adam Windsor
- Dynamite Championship Wrestling
  - DCW Heavyweight Championship (1 times)
- First Class Championship Wrestling
  - FCCW Heavyweight Championship (1 time)
- Main Event Championship Wrestling
  - MECW Heavyweight Championship (1 time)
- Vintage Wrestling
  - Vintage Wrestling Tag Team Championship (1 time) - with Adam Windsor
- World Xtreme Wrestling
  - WXW Tag Team Championship (1 time) - with Adam Windsor
- Southern Wrestling Federation
  - SWF Tag Team Championship - with Adam Windsor

== Filmography ==
| Year | Title | Role | Notes |
|---|---|---|---|
| 2001-2003 | BANG TV on Fox 51 | Himself | Episodic TV Show |
| 2003 | Ultimate Warriors | Himself | Television documentary |
| 2004 | Irish Whip Wrestling on TWC | Himself | Episodic TV Show |
| 2010-2011 | WXW Rage TV | Himself | Episodic TV Show |
| 2011 | Thomas Sterling Cole | Drifter 1 | Film |
