= Demento =

Demento may refer to:

- Damien Demento, pro wrestler
- Dr. Demento, American radio personality
- Haunting Ground, a horror video game known as Demento in Japan
