= Chris Adams (wrestler) =

English judoka and professional wrestler

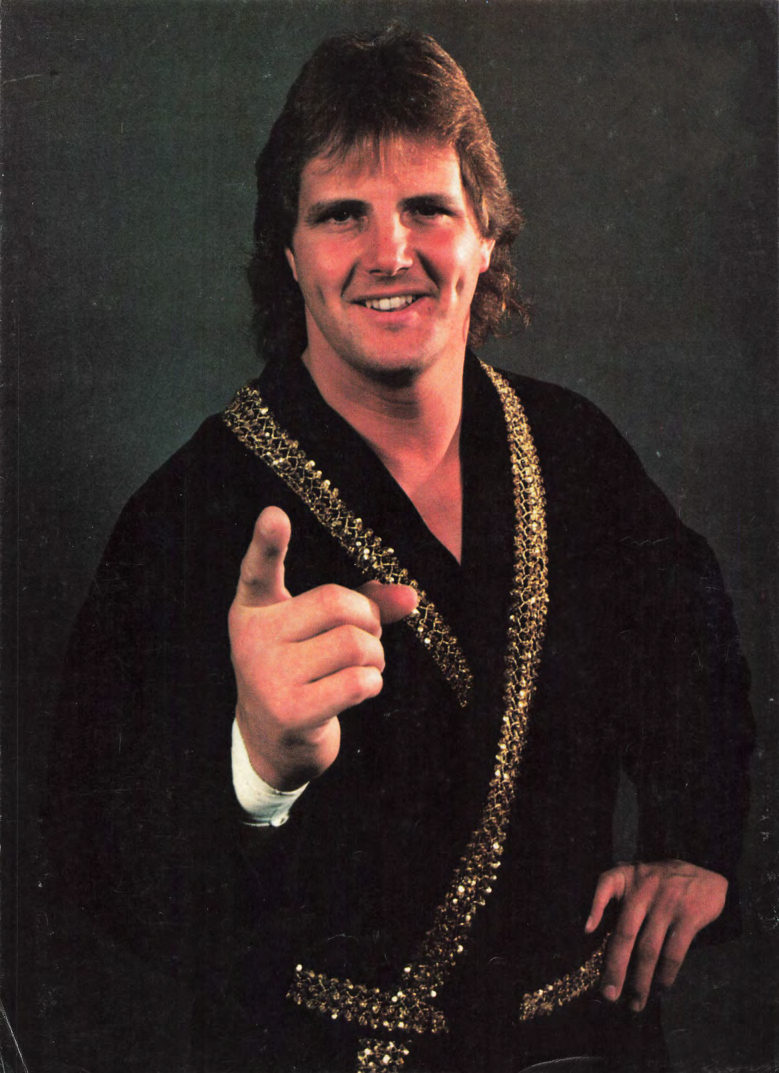
- Adams, c. 1985
- Born: 10 February 1955; Rugby, Warwickshire, England
- Died: 7 October 2001 (aged 46); Waxahachie, Texas, U.S.
- Resting place: Oak Grove Memorial Gardens (Irving, Texas)
- Occupations: Professional wrestler, promoter, trainer, judoka
- Spouses: Toni Adams (m. 1984; div. 1994) Karen Burge (m. 2001)
- Children: 3
- Relatives: Neil Adams (brother)
- Professional wrestling career
- Ring name(s): Chris Adams; The Masked Avenger
- Billed height: 6 ft 1 in (185 cm)
- Billed weight: 229 lb (104 kg)
- Billed from: Stratford-upon-Avon, England
- Trained by: Tony St. Clair; Shirley Crabtree
- Debut: 1978
- Retired: 2000

Christopher Adams (10 February 1955 – 7 October 2001), best known as "Gentleman" Chris Adams, was an English professional wrestler, promoter, coach, and judoka.

He won the British National Judo Championship in his age and weight class three times by the time he was 21. Adams achieved his greatest success in World Class Championship Wrestling (WCCW), where he rose to fame and reached the position of World Heavyweight Champion. He also performed for organizations like the Universal Wrestling Association (UWA), where he held the Light Heavyweight Championship of the World Wrestling Federation (WWF), and World Championship Wrestling (WCW). Throughout a 23-year professional wrestling career, he held a total of 26 titles.

Adams was in charge of training Stone Cold Steve Austin and popularizing the superkick finisher, which was subsequently employed by many other performers. Speaking about his legacy, professional wrestling journalist and historian Dave Meltzer has described Adams as being "one of the twenty best performers" in the United States at the peak of his career but stated that the problems stemming from Adams' drug addiction ruined both his career and personal life.

== Early life ==
Adams was the eldest child of Cyril and Jean Adams when he was born in Rugby, Warwickshire. He got into judo when he was nine years old and trained in it solely for 14 years. Together with his younger brother Neil, he went on to win judo national and international championships. Neil also won a silver medal at the 1980 and 1984 Summer Olympics. Adams was a member of the British judo team for the 1976 Summer Olympics, however he never took part in any competitions. He was skilled in various martial arts and had a black belt in judo. Along with competing in football, rugby, cricket, and amateur wrestling, he also spent four years studying architecture outside of athletics.

== Professional wrestling career ==
=== Early career and World of Sport (1978–1982) ===
Adams made his debut in professional wrestling in June 1978 without having received any real official training and instead relying on his judo experience. He was a wrestler for Joint Promotions and appeared on ITV's World of Sport frequently. Adams did enjoy some championship success in England, taking home the British Light Heavyweight Championship from Mark "Rollerball" Rocco and the British Commonwealth Tag Team Championship with Marty Jones. Adrian Street, Big Daddy, Dave "Fit" Finlay, Dynamite Kid and Davey Boy Smith were among the British wrestlers whom Adams battled against.

He relocated to Los Angeles in 1981 to compete at the Olympic Auditorium, which was run for a short period of time at the time by renowned judo giants Mike and Gene LeBell. Adams wrestled barefoot, but after his initial tour of the United States, he began to use wrestling boots, arm pads and kneepads, which he would eventually use for the rest of his career. He became famous for a wide variety of moves, including somersaulting out of arm-bars, using backflips, diving through the ring ropes to his opponent on the floor, using a lethal enzuigiri when his left leg was held, and a powerful thrust kick, which was originally called a "judo kick", later known by its more common name, "superkick".

Adams won the NWA Americas title in 1982, and was an NWA Americas tag team title winner with Tom Prichard and Ringo Rigby. He lived in Santa Monica and wrestled throughout the California coast in cards promoted by the LeBells. He also wrestled for Don Owen's Pacific Northwest promotion, as well as being involved in several tours of Japan, Europe, Mexico and Canada.

=== World Class Championship Wrestling and other Texas promotions (1983–1987) ===
==== 1983–1984 ====
Fritz Von Erich got in touch with Adams in 1983 and invited him to wrestle for World Class Championship Wrestling (WCCW). On 15 April 1983, he began competing for the Dallas-based organization. That evening, he won both matches he competed in, defeating the Mongol by disqualification and Roberto Renesto in the card's first battle. The Adkissons referred to Chris as Kevin Von Erich's "pen pal" and referred to him as an "honorary Von Erich". In a three-minute interview piece titled "Tea for Two," Adams and Bill Mercer were first introduced in WCCW during one of Mercer's "outside the ring" interviews when they first met at a nearby Dallas restaurant over a round of English tea.

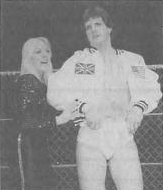
Adams (right) and manager Sunshine, c. 1984

Before losing to Kamala in a WCCW match on 20 June in Fort Worth, Adams won his first eleven contests. On 19 August, Kerry Von Erich served as his partner in his debut tag bout with the Von Erichs. He frequently partnered with the Von Erichs in six and eight-man tag matches against the Fabulous Freebirds. Adams and Jimmy Garvin got into a fight, and the valets Sunshine and Precious joined in; Sunshine aligned with Adams. Adams took on the guise of "the Masked Avenger" in a match on 21 October at the Sportatorium to earn a shot at the NWA American Heavyweight Championship, which he eventually won on Thanksgiving at the Reunion Arena. This was the first of five World Class American/World Class World Heavyweight title reigns for Adams. His first title reign ended when the title was held up in the rematch at WCCW Star Wars when Garvin pinned him. Adams scored a loser-leaves-town match victory over Garvin on 4 July 1984.

In August, Adams employed Gary Hart as his manager before turning on him. Adams was given a contract to dismiss Hart in exchange for the Von Erichs forgiving him when he was pinned by Kevin Von Erich in a bout on 27 October. Adams seized a wooden chair and slammed it against Von Erich's skull in retaliation. Adams said that the chair had accidentally split in half, causing blood and a concussion. At the Reunion Arena a month later, Von Erich finally paid Adams back. This time, the chair shattered in two on contact, leaving a piece of wood trapped in Adams' nose, just next to his eye. The angle came to an abrupt stop as a result. Alongside Jake Roberts and Gino Hernandez, Adams later competed in a six-man tag team match, winning against Kerry Von Erich, Mike Von Erich and Bobby Fulton (subbing for the injured Kevin Von Erich). The fans chanted during the match "Chris is a traitor" and others held "Benedict Adams" posters.

==== 1985–1986 ====
Adams was kayfabe dismissed by Hart at the beginning of 1985. The second iteration of the Dynamic Duo was formed when he linked up with Gino Hernandez. Adams competed against NWA World Champion Ric Flair on multiple occasions, coming close to capturing the title twice. When the One Man Gang interfered in a bout, Adams lost because Flair was pinned for at least 10 seconds while the referee was preoccupied. Adams was also embroiled in a superkick competition with the Great Kabuki, who was Sunshine's ally in her conflict with Adams. Adams created a gimmick with Hernandez that Brutus Beefcake subsequently adopted: shaving his opponents' hair after a match.

The outcome was a lumberjack hair vs. hair match between Adams and Hernandez and Kevin and Kerry Von Erich in October 1985 at the Cotton Bowl in Dallas. The Von Erichs triumphed, leaving Adams and Hernandez with no hair, forcing them to temporarily wrestle in masks while their hair came back. Adams and Hernandez got divorced and got into a protracted fight. In this period, Adams started wrestling for Gary Hart's Texas All-Star Wrestling organization in San Antonio, and he soon started to turn face.

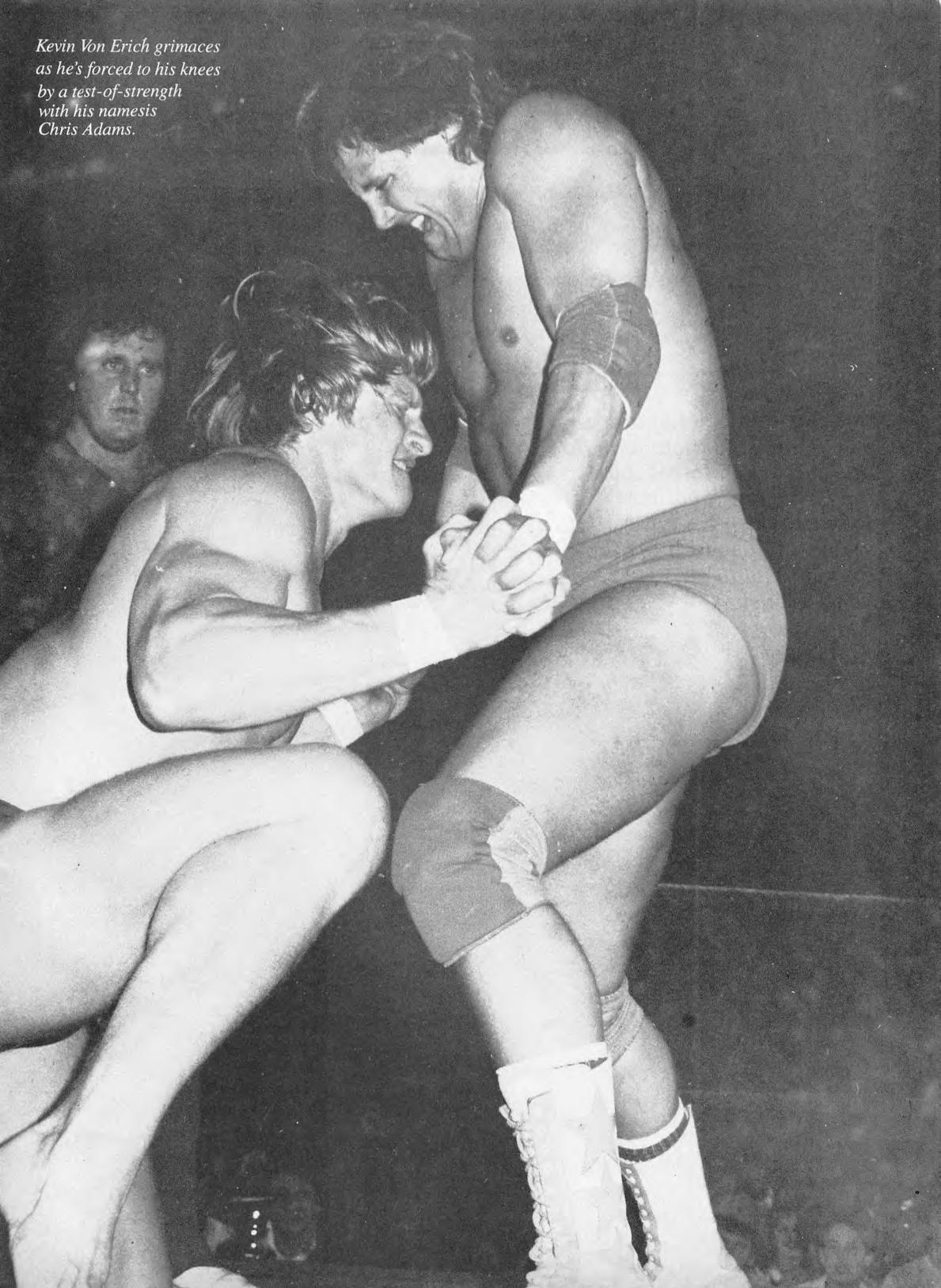
Adams (right) winning a test of strength against Kevin Von Erich (left), circa 1986

In 1985 on Christmas night, Adams and Hernandez reunited to face The Cosmic Cowboys, which ended up being Kevin and Kerry Von Erich. Hernandez, claiming a knee injury, refused to be tagged in by Adams during the match. Adams took a brutal beating at the hands of the Von Erichs. Adams purposely tossed Kevin over the rope to end the match and slapped Hernandez for not tagging him and left the ring. On 27 January 1986, Adams and Hernandez squared off at the Fort Worth Convention Center with the condition that the loser would once more lose his hair, this time by having Freebird Hair Cream massaged into the scalp. When Hernandez put some of the hair cream (which was actually a dark liquid substance) into Adams' eyes during an argument with the referee Rick Hazzard, Adams was unable to win the match. Adams then went on vacation to see his family in England and travel to Japan and Israel before returning to Texas to pursue his feud with Hernandez, which was written off as a result of the blinding incident. On 4 February 1986, Hernandez was discovered to be deceased.

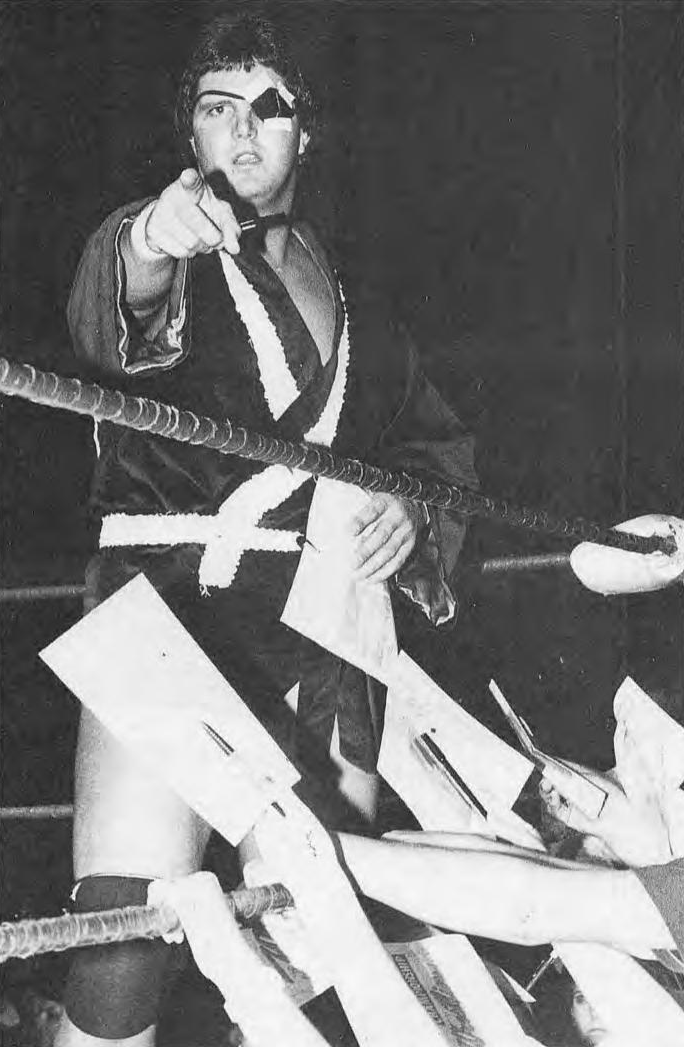
Adams with an eyepatch, circa 1986

Adams toured Japan in March 1986 for New Japan Pro Wrestling events. Still selling his blinding angle at the time, the matches never aired on World Class television. Adams returned to Texas All Star Wrestling and WCCW in April. He had several matches with Matt Borne, Blackjack Mulligan, Kabuki and Buzz Sawyer, and worked an angle with Rick Rude, whom he defeated for the World Class heavyweight title on 4 July. Due to legal issues, Adams had to forfeit the WCCW title in September; WCCW stated that Black Bart had won the title during a match in Los Angeles that never actually happened. A month later, Bart lost the title to Kevin Von Erich at the Cotton Bowl. In September 1986, Adams left World Class to join Bill Watts' Universal Wrestling Federation (UWF), which later merged into NWA. Adams came back to World Class in October 1987.

=== Various promotions (1987–1997) ===
In late 1986, Adams defected to the Universal Wrestling Federation, where he and Terry Taylor became tag team champions in February 1987. Two months later, Taylor and Adams began a violent feud which eventually was carried over to WCCW in 1988, but he suffered nerve damage in his back during one of their matches. Adams and former partner King Parsons also engaged in a similar feud (with Parsons referencing Adams' legal troubles), which would continue on and off for the next decade. Adams competed in Mike George's World Wrestling Alliance promotion (formerly Central States Wrestling) in Missouri and had brief events in Georgia in Southern Championship Wrestling (where he won that federation's heavyweight title in 1988) and Florida before promoting his own matches under the brand L&A Promotions, with Tom Lance as his business partner.

In late 1988, Adams began operating his professional wrestling school at the Dallas Sportatorium, upon returning to World Class, on top of selling wrestling rings. In 1989, Steve Austin was one of Adams' students, and he was wrestling his first match at Sportatorium within five months. The duo feuded against each other throughout the United States Wrestling Association. Austin later described Adams as a “con man deluxe” and “a pile of crap” since he was known for taking trainees money, stiffing them, and ill-preparing them. In late 1990, following the demise of WCCW, Adams, alongside Norman Smiley against Konnan and Rey Misterio, competed in the Pat O'Connor Memorial Tag Team Tournament on 16 December at Starrcade, in which Konnan pinned Smiley. Adams also wrestled in other independent promotions, like the Global Wrestling Federation (GWF), in which he twice won the federation's Heavyweight Championship in 1994, and shortly with Jim Crockett's 1995 version of the National Wrestling Alliance (NWA). In 1993, Adams promoted a modestly successful tour to Nigeria (co-sponsored with Pepsi). He also competed on and off in Mexico prior to joining the GWF.

In 1993, Adams started a feud with Rod Price after he accidentally (or intentionally, according to Price) ripped the hair weave off Price's head, causing him to get over 200 stitches. He also went back to his legendary feud with Iceman King Parsons, in which his wife Toni was Parsons' manager. During one interview segment, Toni and Iceman were making plans to vacation in Hawaii, where Adams and Toni married in 1985. Adams also formed a tag team with Kerry Von Erich, until Von Erich's suicide on 18 February 1993. On the side, Adams went to Memphis, Tennessee and competed in the United States Wrestling Association for a few months, where he was involved in an angle involving Brian Christopher, while Toni was billed as "Nanny Simpson." Adams also faced Eddie Gilbert several times for the heavyweight title. After his stint in the Global Wrestling Federation, Adams joined the Jim Crockett-promoted NWA Dallas and wrestled in several matches against Greg Valentine, Black Bart, Michael Hayes and Tully Blanchard. After finishing his time at the NWA, Adams competed in a Chicago-based organization, the American Wrestling Federation that promoted under European wrestling rules. He was also a promoter and wrestler of a few Dallas-based organizations, including Big D Pro Wrestling and the Freestyle Wrestling Federation.

=== World Championship Wrestling (1997–1999) ===
In 1997, Adams began competing as a midcard performer in World Championship Wrestling. He was intended to become part of The Blue Bloods, a stable consisting of his fellow Englishmen Lord Steven Regal and Squire David Taylor, but due to legitimate personal issues, this was short lived. He was engaged in a feud with Glacier over their superkicks, as well as Chip Minton. On 23 November at World War 3, Adams competed and lost a 60-man battle royal for a future shot at the WCW World Heavyweight Championship. Adams wrestled Randy Savage in the first match of the first WCW Thunder show in January 1998; he pinned Savage, but J. J. Dillon reversed the decision and claimed Savage the victory via disqualification by interference by Lex Luger. Aside from that, he was mainly used as a jobber and in late 1999, unsatisfied with his role in the organization, Adams was granted his release from WCW. He then returned to Texas to work as a promoter and part-time wrestler.

== Personal life ==
Adams was involved in a relationship with Jeanie Clarke, an English model, who worked ringside and managed his career from the late 1970s to the early 1980s. They had one daughter together, Jade. Adams later married Toni Collins on 20 December 1984 in Hawaii. They had a son together, Christopher Jr. They divorced on 15 August 1994, and Toni died on 24 June 2010 at the age of 45.

Adams also fathered a daughter, Julia (born 1994), by Brandi Freeman. Adams had promoted "Miss Brandi" that Freeman wrestled in, at a handful of wrestling cards. The couple split in late 1999. Freeman died in 2003 from a drug overdose, leaving Julia orphaned. Six weeks prior to his death, Adams married a second time to Karen J. Burge on 25 August 2001 in Dallas, with his friend Brent Parnell serving as the best man at his wedding.

His daughter Jade was married to and had three children with professional wrestler Adam Bryniarski. Bryniarski died in 2022.

=== Legal issues ===
While returning from a wrestling event in Puerto Rico, on 30 June 1986, Adams grabbed airline pilot John Bentley by the collar, headbutted him three times and punched a male flight attendant, which resulted in a 90-day jail sentence and a $500 fine in September. During the flight, an intoxicated Adams became belligerent when liquor sales were stopped during the flight by an onboard FAA Inspector and Adams had to be restrained by other wrestlers who were on the flight, including Kevin Von Erich.

In February 1988, Adams was arrested after his wife, Toni, was found severely beaten in Lufkin, Texas, allegedly by Adams during a drunken rage; he was sentenced to a year's probation. Adams then faced more legal issues in 1991, being put on probation for a pair of DUI arrests.

== Death ==
In April 2000, Adams and his girlfriend of four months, Linda Kaphengst, were both found unconscious inside a friend's apartment, the victims of an overdose of the drug GHB and alcohol. Adams recovered, but 10 hours later, Kaphengst died at a local hospital. He then lived in Rowlett with his new wife Karen and their 7-year-old daughter.

In June 2001, Adams was indicted and charged with manslaughter for the death of Kaphengst and turned himself in but, while awaiting trial, on October 7, 2001, he was fatally shot in the chest with a .38 caliber handgun during a drunken brawl with a friend, William Brent "Booray" Parnell, at the home of Mr. Parnell's mother in the 200 block of Sendero Drive. The two started “roughhousing” and wrestling, and the play got out of hand. Parnell reached over on a nightstand, got a gun and shot Adams once in the chest, killing him. He was 46 years old. Parnell claimed self-defense and was acquitted of all charges.

== Legacy ==
A documentary about Adams, The Gentleman's Choice, was released on 16 December 2008 by former WCCW promoter Mickey Grant and showed interviews from many of Adams' friends and family, including his brother Neil, Bill Mercer, referee David Manning, Kevin Von Erich, Jeanie Clarke (billed as Jeanie Adams in the documentary), his widow Karen, and Gary Hart.

In April 2024 Dark Side of the Ring aired an episode looking at the life and career of Adams. The day afterwards professional wrestling journalist and historian Dave Meltzer described Adams as being "one of the twenty best performers" in the United States at the peak of his career but stated that the problems stemming from Adams' drug addiction ruined both his career and personal life.

== Championships and accomplishments ==
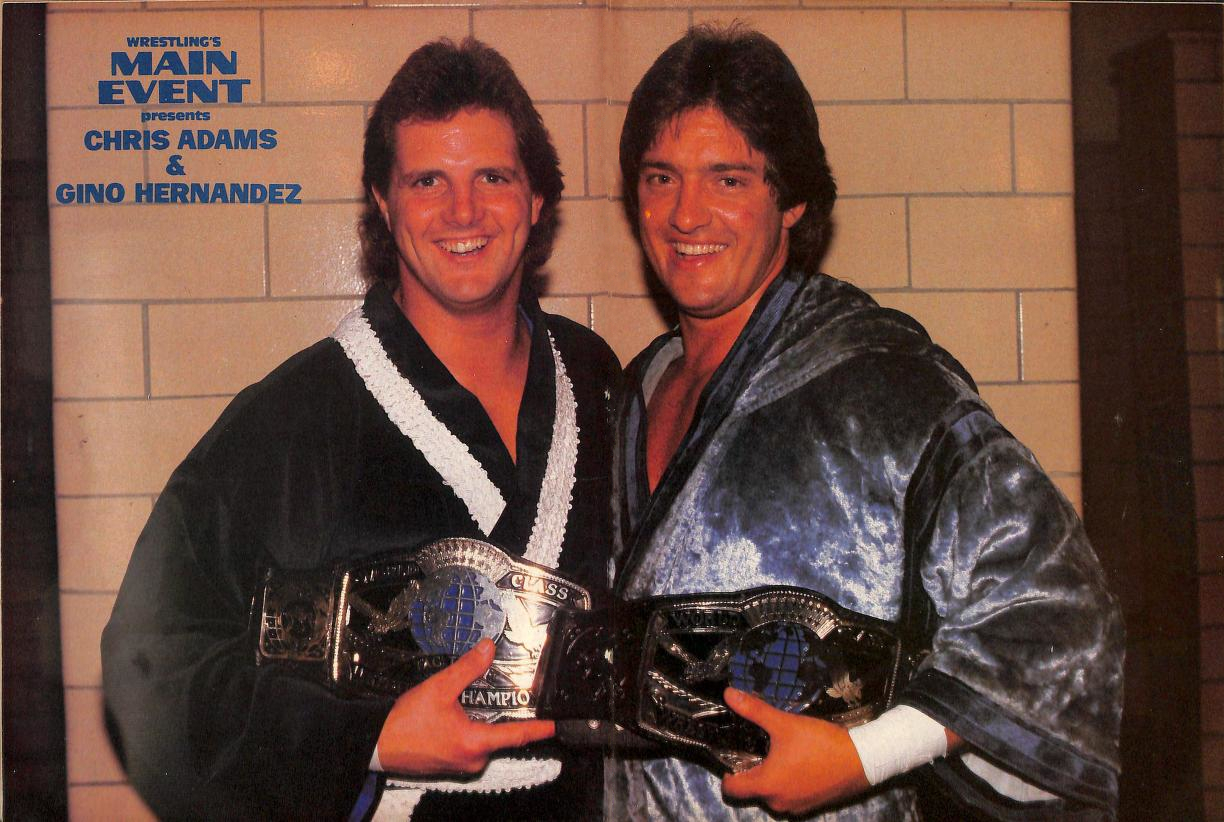
Adams with his tag team partner Gino Hernandez c. 1985. Known collectively as the "Dynamic Duo", the pair are seen here holding the WCWA World Tag Team Championship.

- Global Wrestling Federation
  - GWF North American Heavyweight Championship (2 times)
- National Class Wrestling
  - NCW Heavyweight Championship (1 time)
- NWA Hollywood Wrestling
  - NWA Americas Heavyweight Championship (2 times)
  - NWA Americas Tag Team Championship (2 times) – with Tom Prichard (1) and Ringo Rigby
  - NWA "Beat the Champ" Television Championship (1 time)
- Pro Wrestling Illustrated
  - PWI Most Inspirational Wrestler of the Year (1986)
  - PWI ranked him No. 160 of the 500 best singles wrestlers of the "PWI Years" in 2003
  - PWI ranked him No. 65 of the 100 best tag teams of the "PWI Years" with Gino Hernandez in 2003
- Southern Championship Wrestling
  - SCW Heavyweight Championship (1 time)
- Universal Wrestling Association
  - WWF Light Heavyweight Championship (1 time)
- Universal Wrestling Federation
  - UWF World Tag Team Championship (1 time) – with Terry Taylor
- World Class Championship Wrestling / World Class Wrestling Association
  - NWA American Heavyweight Championship (4 times)
  - NWA American Tag Team Championship (2 times) – with Gino Hernandez
  - NWA Texas Brass Knuckles Championship (1 time)
  - NWA Texas Heavyweight Championship (1 time)
  - NWA World Six-Man Tag Team Championship (Texas version) (2 times) – with Gino Hernandez and Jake Roberts (1), and Steve Simpson and Kevin Von Erich (1)
  - WCCW Television Championship (3 times)
  - WCWA Television Championship (1 time)
  - WCWA World Heavyweight Championship (1 time)

^{1}While he did win the championship, the win and reign are no longer recognised by World Wrestling Entertainment. All reigns with the championship prior to December 1997 are not officially recognised.

== See also ==
- List of premature professional wrestling deaths
