= Monday Night Raw debut episode =

Professional wrestling television special

Monday Night Raw Debut
- The Debut Monday Night Raw logo, used until March 3, 1997.
- Promotion: WWF
- Brand: Raw
- Date: January 11, 1993
- City: New York City
- Venue: Manhattan Center

Raw special episodes chronology
← Previous first	Next → Raw's 2nd Anniversary

The Monday Night Raw debut episode was a professional wrestling event that marked the debut of WWE's (then WWF) weekly WWE Raw television program. The event took place on January 11, 1993.

The show aired live on the USA Network, taking place at the Grand Ballroom at the Manhattan Center in New York City.

== Storylines ==
The event included matches that resulted from scripted storylines, where wrestlers portrayed heroes, villains, or less distinguishable characters in scripted events that built tension and culminated in a wrestling match or series of matches. Results were predetermined by WWE's writers.

== Event ==
Backstage interviewer Sean Mooney opens the show as Bobby "The Brain" Heenan attempts to enter the building with Mooney denying him entry due to the show being sold out. The commentary team of Vince McMahon, Randy Savage and local radio DJ Rob Bartlett are then introduced.

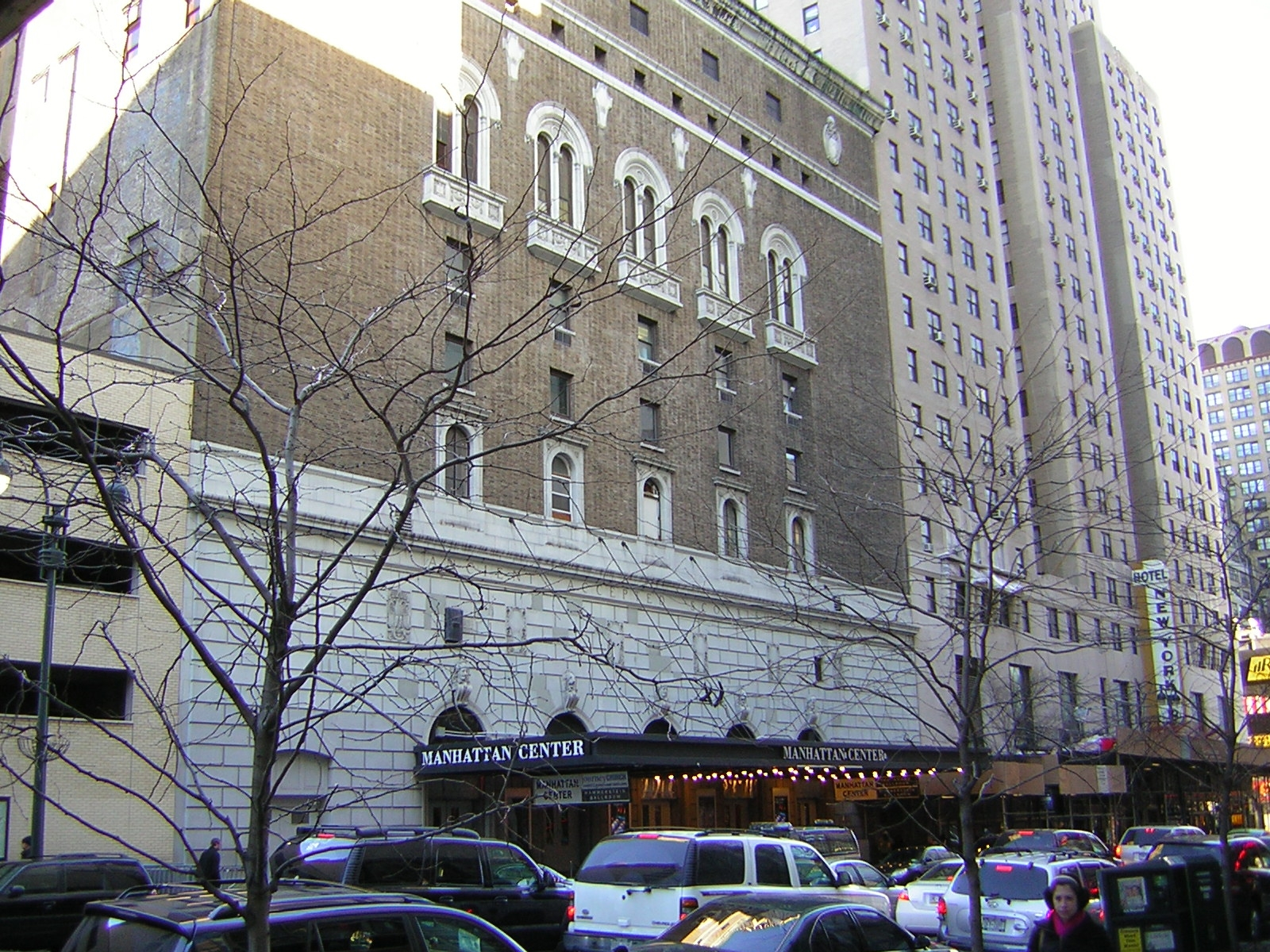
The Manhattan Center

A promo is then shown announcing the debut of "Narcissus" followed by Bobby Heenan once again unsuccessfully attempting to enter the building, disguised as Rob Bartlett's aunt.

Vince McMahon interviews Razor Ramon to discuss his upcoming WWF World Heavyweight Championship against Bret Hart at the Royal Rumble.

Throughout the show, Doink the Clown is shown in the audience, McMahon interviews him to end the show, with Crush interrupting. In the final segment, Bobby Heenan was allowed to enter the building, only to have found out that the show ended.

== Results ==
No.	Results	Stipulations	Times
1	Yokozuna (w/ Mr. Fuji) defeated Koko B. Ware	Singles match	3:45
2	Steiner Brothers (Rick and Scott Steiner) defeated The Executioners (Duane Gill and Barry Hardy)	Tag team match	3:00
3	Shawn Michaels (c) defeated Max Moon	Singles match for the WWF Intercontinental Championship	10:30
4	The Undertaker (w/ Paul Bearer) defeated Damien Demento	Singles match	2:26
5^{D}	Crush defeated Bam Bam Bigelow	Singles match	—
(c) / – the champion(s) heading into the match; D / – this was a dark match
