= Frank Hickey (Canadian football) =

Canadian football player

Profile
- Position: Halfback

Personal information
- Born: June 9, 1924
- Died: December 9, 2013 (aged 89); Toronto, Ontario, Canada
- Listed height: 5 ft 11 in (1.80 m)
- Listed weight: 218 lb (99 kg)

Career information
- University: Toronto

Career history
- 1945–1948: Toronto Argonauts
- 1949–1951: Edmonton Eskimos

Awards and highlights
- 2× Grey Cup champion (1945, 1947)

Frank Robert Hickey (June 9, 1924 – December 9, 2013) was a Canadian professional football player who played for the Toronto Argonauts and Edmonton Eskimos. He won the Grey Cup with Toronto in 1945 and 1947. Hickey attended the University of Toronto.
