= Manhattan Center =

Building in Manhattan, New York

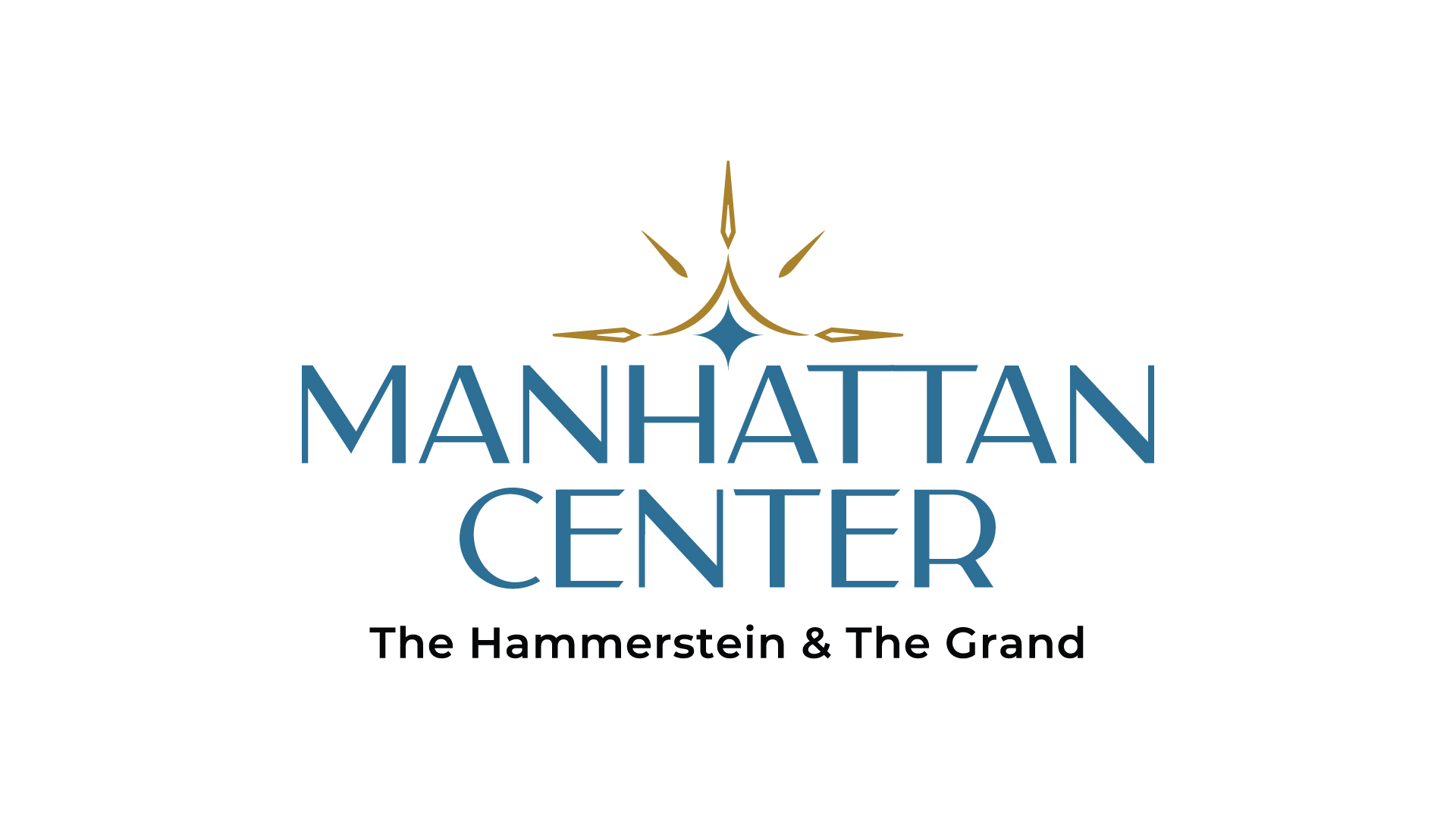
- MC Logo 2025

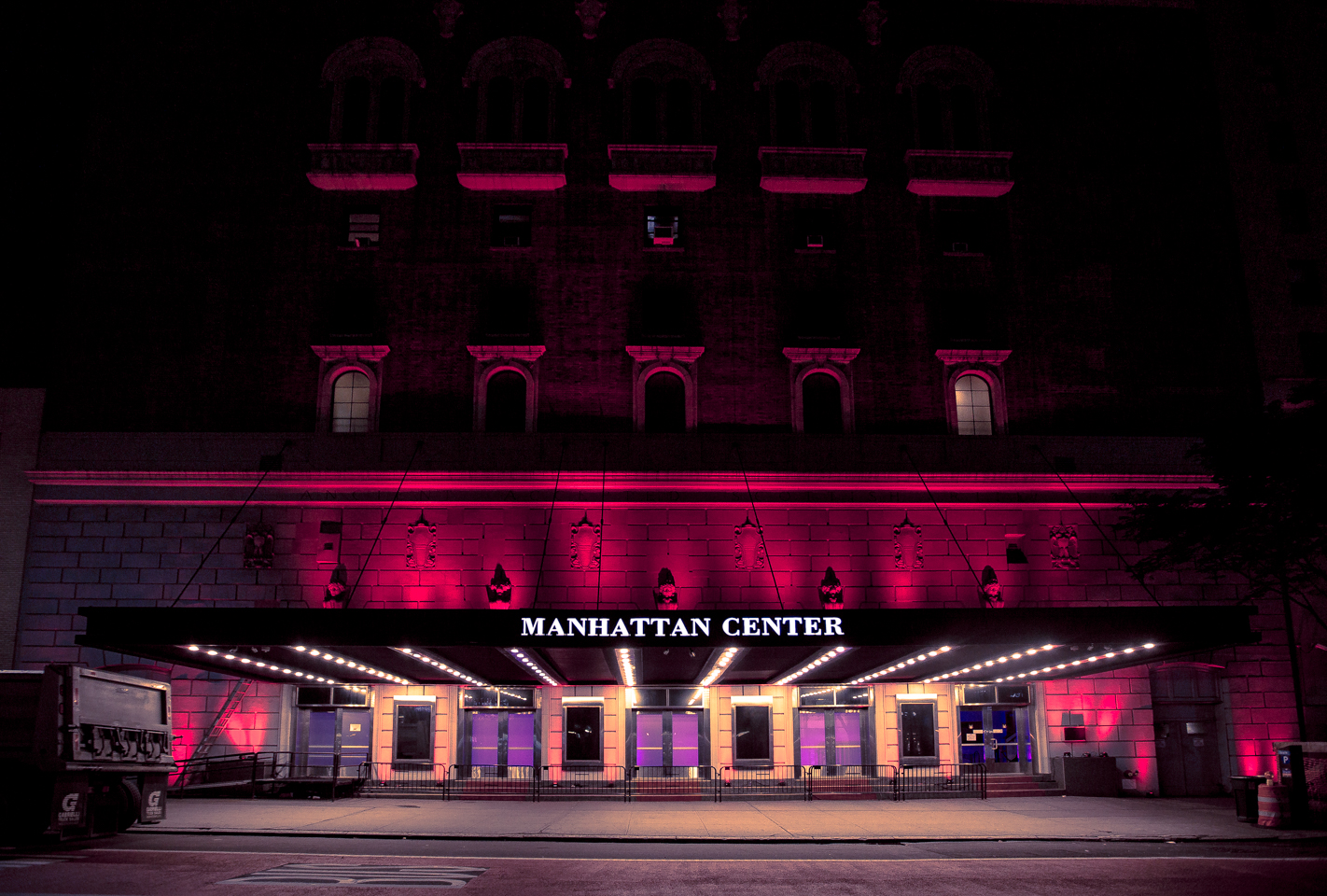
- Manhattan Center at night

General information
- Type: Building
- Location: 311 West 34th Street, New York City, United States
- Coordinates: 40.752908°N 73.994189°W
- Opened: 1906
- Owner: Unification Church

Website
- Official website

The Manhattan Center is a building in Midtown Manhattan, New York City. Built in 1906 and located at 311 West 34th Street, it houses Manhattan Center Studios, the location of two recording studios; its Grand Ballroom; and the Hammerstein Ballroom, a performance venue. In 1976, the building was purchased by its current owner, the Unification Church, for $3 million. Tenants include: Telemundo, Macy's, CFDA, WeWork, Facebook, iHeart Media, Samsung, American Heart Association, Robin Hood, FX Network, Endeavor, MAC Cosmetics, Viacom, SiriusXM, NBA, NBC Universal, Masterbeat, Formerly Al Jazeera America HQ, Broadway Cares Equity Fights AIDS.

== History ==
The Manhattan Center was originally called the Manhattan Opera House and was built in 1906 by Oscar Hammerstein I, and was located one half block east of the 9th Avenue Elevated's 34th Street station. Hammerstein boldly sought to compete with the established Metropolitan Opera (at the time, located at the first Metropolitan Opera House, five blocks to the north) by offering grand opera to the New York public at lower ticket prices and with a superior orchestra and stage productions. Rapidly, it received critical acclaim and became a popular alternative to the Met, and many great operas and celebrated singers debuted at the new theater.

In 1910, after the Metropolitan Opera felt it could no longer tolerate the competition, it offered Hammerstein $1.2 million to cease producing opera for a period of 10 years. He accepted the offer and experimented with various other types of entertainment before ultimately selling the building. In March 1911, it was opened as a "combination" house by the Shubert brothers featuring vaudeville shows during the week and concerts on Sunday nights at affordable prices.

In 1922, the Manhattan Opera House was purchased by the Ancient Accepted Scottish Rite of Free Masonry, who built a new building façade and a new Grand Ballroom on the seventh floor. In 1926, Warner Bros rented the ballroom to set up a studio for the Vitaphone sound-on-disc system to record the New York Philharmonic orchestra for the film Don Juan. That film marked the release of the inaugural commercial film featuring a recorded musical soundtrack.

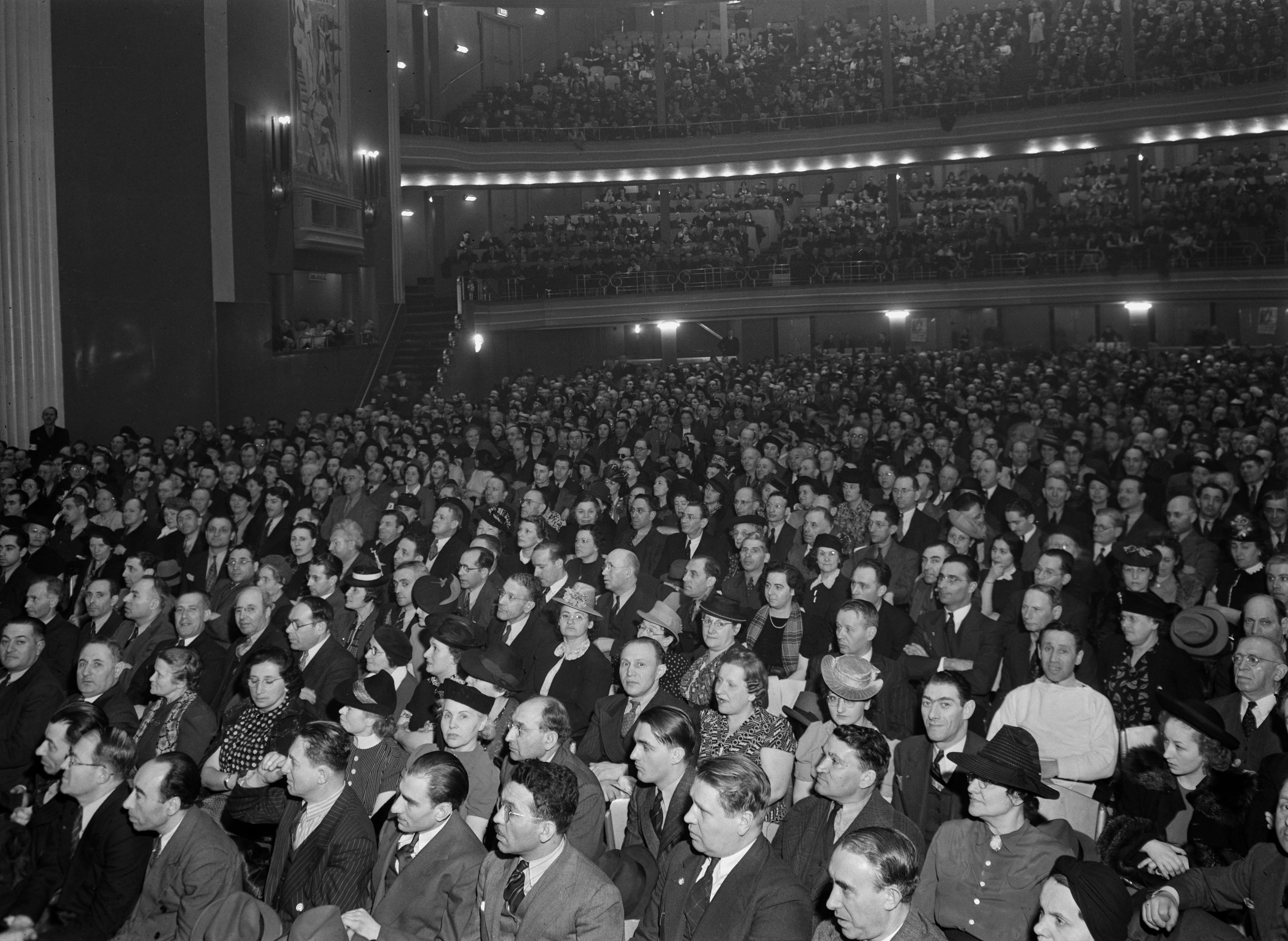
The crowd at an anti-Dies Committee rally, hosted by the International Workers Order, at Manhattan Center, April 24, 1940

By 1939, the name of the building had been changed to the Manhattan Center, now a multi purpose venue featuring a variety of different types of events. In 1986, Manhattan Center Studios was formed to develop the center into a venue with the capability of holding multimedia festivities. MCS expanded the audio recording facilities when Studio 4 was opened in 1993. Studio 7 was rebuilt in 1996 to become a state-of-the-art control room capable of servicing all types of recordings and live events in the ballrooms.

In March 1990, the company began investing in video equipment and studio facilities to expand into the video and television industry. The company's video post production facilities in Studio 9 were completed in 1993 and in the years that followed, two fully equipped television studios were built. Studio 1 was completed in 1994 and Studio 6 was completed in 1995. The connection of the studios to the Ballrooms makes them attractive venues for live broadcast events and webcasts. Studio 1 and Studio 6 were temporarily closed throughout the Spring and Summer of 2003 to complete extensive upgrades as the company entered into a three-year contract with Atlantic Video, a Washington, D.C.–based television services and production company.

Beginning in 1997, the Hammerstein Ballroom underwent a major renovation and reopened as a concert hall for popular musical acts.

== Events ==
The Manhattan Center became a hot spot for "big band" dances as well as trade shows, union meetings and other social functions.

WWE Raw recorded its inaugural episode at the Grand Ballroom on January 11, 1993. A special Raw 25th anniversary special was co-hosted with the Barclays Center on January 22, 2018. The Hammerstein Ballroom has hosted Extreme Championship Wrestling events in the years before its closing and in its revivals in 2005 and 2006. Since 2006, the Manhattan Center has played host to yearly Ring of Honor events, both in the Grand Ballroom and the Hammerstein Ballroom. In 2014, TNA taped multiple episodes of their Impact Wrestling TV program at the Grand Ballroom on June 25–27, and then again August 5–7 and in 2015 also held their debut on Destination America and taped upcoming episodes on January 7–9. Game Changer Wrestling held their first event at the Hammerstein Ballroom on January 23, 2022.

Several seasons of NBC's America's Got Talent were taped there.

The Manhattan Center was home to Al Jazeera America's main studio and production facilities.
