= Toni Adams =

American wrestling valet (1964-2010)

Personal information
- Born: Toni Lea Collins; August 19, 1964 Freer, Texas, U.S.
- Died: June 24, 2010 (aged 45) Louisville, Kentucky, U.S.
- Spouse: Chris Adams (m. 1984; div. 1994)
- Children: 2

Professional wrestling career
- Ring name(s): Toni Adams; Toni the Tigress; Miss Simpson; Nanny Simpson
- Billed from: Corpus Christi, Texas, U.S.
- Trained by: Chris Adams
- Debut: 1985
- Retired: 1995

Toni Lea Adams (née Collins) (August 19, 1964 – June 24, 2010) was an American professional wrestling valet who appeared in several North American regional promotions during the 1980s including the Universal Wrestling Federation and the United States Wrestling Association, although she was best known as the manager of her late ex-husband Chris Adams while in World Class Championship Wrestling and the Global Wrestling Federation.

Among those she managed were Brian Christopher, Scotty Flamingo, Koko B. Ware, Tony Falk, Rod Price and Iceman Parsons.

== Career ==
=== Early career ===
Toni Lea Collins was born in Freer, Texas, and began working in Fritz Von Erich's World Class Championship Wrestling as an assistant to the production staff in 1984. Meeting Chris Adams while working in the promotion, the two were married in Hawaii. Adams's appearances on World Class television were sporadic, however she made one memorable appearance in a 1986 interview where she was helping husband Chris (with his eyes bandaged selling his blinding injury) into his Corvette to drive to the airport en route to England. Adams again appeared in another interview between Chris and announcer Bill Mercer two months later, as he continued selling his eye injury (with vision restored to his right eye, but not to his left). Following her husband to the Mid-South area, she soon appeared in an on-camera role for Bill Watts' Universal Wrestling Federation interviewing wrestlers and fans. Upon Chris' return to World Class in late-1987 she appeared as one of the ringside ladies.

Adams eventually made her managerial debut appearing with Chris in World Class Championship Wrestling in 1989. Soon after, she along with ring announcer Frank Dusek were attacked by Tojo Yamamoto & Phil Hickerson, billed as P.Y. Chu-Hi. While held by Chu-Hi, Yamamoto ripped open her blouse before Chris came out from the locker room to chase them off. As the feud continued for several weeks, Adams began carrying kendo sticks to the ring and used them against Yamamoto & Hickerson during matches against Chris. After the conclusion of this feud, she and Chris would become involved in another feud with Billy Travis and, at one point, was spanked by Travis in the middle of the Dallas Sportatorium while Chris was handcuffed to the ring rope. During this time, she would run a summer camp as well as co-manage Chris's wrestling school during the late 1980s (under the brand name Chris Adams Promotions). The two would also be in attendance at the National Association of Television Programming Executives at the New Orleans Convention Center in New Orleans, Louisiana, in January 1990 along with other television celebrities such as Vanna White, Alex Trebek, Geraldo Riviera, Oprah Winfrey, Sally Jessy Raphael and Donald Trump.

=== Feud with Steve Austin & Jeanie Clarke ===
Returning with Chris to the United States Wrestling Association in May 1990, she would become involved in a storyline in which Chris began feuding with former protege Steve Austin. The feud, which Chris created and developed, would later involve her and Chris's former girlfriend Jeanie Clarke (billed as Chris' "ex-wife"), who eventually married Steve Austin, and faced each other in mixed tag team matches for much of the year in one of the most memorable feuds in the region. As Chris's drinking problem became out of control, particularly one incident in which he had assaulted Adams in February 1989 for which he was sentenced to one year's probation, Adams would divorce Chris soon after the feud, which occurred sometime around 1991. The couple shared one son, Christopher Adams Jr., born in late 1988.

=== Later career ===
In late 1993, she returned to the USWA, losing to Rockin' Robin at the Mid-South Coliseum in Memphis, Tennessee on September 13, 1993. Managing Brian Christopher as Nanny Simpson, she participated in several mixed tag team matches with him against Koko B. Ware and Miss Texas during the next several weeks eventually pinning Miss Texas on October 18. However, she lost to Miss Texas and Sweet Georgia Brown in a tag team match with Vicious Viki on November 1 and, a week later, lost to Miss Texas in a "chain match" by disqualification on November 8. The following month she feuded with Dirty White Girl losing to her at the November Blast supercard by disqualification on November 18 and in a "street fight" match several days later. During that same event, she was forced to eat dog food as a result of a stipulation in which Jerry Lawler and Brian Christopher defeated Rex Hargrove & Koko B. Ware. Briefly managing Eddie Gilbert before his feud with Jerry Lawler, she later resurfaced in the Global Wrestling Federation as part of Skandor Akbar's Devastation, Inc. and later as the valet of Iceman King Parsons during his feud with Chris Adams until the promotion's close. Adams retired around 1995, remaining out of the spotlight permanently. She would eventually marry two more times during the final 15 years of her life.

== Death ==
Adams, known as Toni Gant, was hospitalized in June 2010 due to an abscess in her abdomen. She was hospitalized again in full cardiac arrest in late June, and died on June 24, 2010, at age 45. At the time of her death she was engaged to Leonard Donahoo.

== Championships and accomplishments ==
- Pro Wrestling Illustrated

- PWI ranked her # 14 of the 100 Hottest Women in Wrestling in 2002

== See also ==
- List of premature professional wrestling deaths
