= Damien Demento =

American professional wrestler

Personal information
- Born: Phillip Theis; June 25, 1958 (age 68) Long Island, New York, U.S.

Professional wrestling career
- Ring name(s): Damien Demento; Jonn Reinhart; Mondo Kleen; Mando Phil
- Billed height: 6 ft 3 in (191 cm)
- Billed weight: 269 lb (122 kg)
- Billed from: "Man's Deepest Fear" (as Mondo Kleen) "The Outer Reaches of Your Mind" (as Damien Demento)
- Trained by: Johnny Rodz
- Debut: 1987
- Retired: 2014

Phillip Theis (born June 25, 1958) is an American former professional wrestler. He is best known for his appearances in the World Wrestling Federation (WWF) between 1992 and 1993 under the ring name Damien Demento. As Damien Demento, Theis wrestled in the main event of the first episode of WWF Monday Night Raw on January 11, 1993, losing to The Undertaker.

== Professional wrestling career ==
=== Early career (1987–1992) ===
After training under Johnny Rodz, Theis made his debut on the independent circuit in 1987 under the ring name "Jonn Reinhart". He later renamed himself "Mondo Kleen". In 1990 he worked for Tri-State Wrestling Alliance. In September 1992, he wrestled a tryout match with World Championship Wrestling as "Mando Phil".

=== World Wrestling Federation (1992–1993, 1994) ===
After The Bushwhackers helped forward a tape of Theis performing an interview, the World Wrestling Federation signed him to a contract. Theis, performing under his Mondo Kleen ring name, debuted in WWF at a live event on October 2, 1992, wrestling Jeff Jarrett in a losing effort. Ten days later, on the October 12 episode of Superstars of Wrestling, Theis made his televised debut under the repackaged ring name and gimmick of "Damien Demento", a villainous character who hailed from "The Outer Reaches of Your Mind" and showed mentally disturbed behavior such as talking to himself. He then proceeded to defeat Steve May in his televised debut match. On the October 28 episode of Wrestling Challenge, he defeated Jim Brunzell. He mostly remained a mid-card performer. Demento was notable for his appearance in the main event of the debut episode of Monday Night Raw on January 11, 1993, where he was defeated by The Undertaker. He made his only pay-per-view appearance at Royal Rumble as a participant in the 1993 Royal Rumble match. Demento lasted over twelve minutes before being eliminated by Carlos Colón. He also appeared at UK Rampage '93, where he lost to Bob Backlund. After this, Demento competed almost solely on house shows before leaving the WWF in October 1993. In July 1994 he came back to work for the WWF in 3 consecutive house shows.

=== Independent circuit (1993–1995; 2008, 2011, 2014) ===
After a stint on the East Coast independent circuit, Theis retired from wrestling in 1995. Under his Damien Demento ring name, he made a short return to wrestling on November 8, 2008, where he defeated The Musketeer in a match for the New York-based World of Unpredictable Wrestling. A month later they had a rematch in which Demento was on the losing end.

He made another return to the squared circle in September 24, 2011. This time wrestling as "Mondo Kleen", he defeated Steven Person in a steel cage match at a show that WUW promoted for the Dumbo Arts Festival.

On October 29, 2011, Damien Demento defeated long time WUW Trophy Champion "Izzy" Israel Joffe at the WUW October show at Gleason's gym to win the WUW Trophy Championship. On December 10, 2011, Israel Joffe defeated Damien Demento at the WUW December show at Gleason's gym.

In 2014, Demento made a few appearances for World Wrestling Organization.

== Filmography ==
- Die Hard with a Vengeance (1995) - Erik

== Personal life ==
Theis originally wanted to become a professional football player. He attended Wagner College on a football scholarship, and majored in art at the school. He later had a tryout with the New York Jets, but did not make team, and instead opted to train for a career in professional wrestling. He cites King Curtis Iaukea as his inspiration for becoming a wrestler.

After retiring from professional wrestling, he began working as an artist and a sculptor.

== Championships and accomplishments ==
- International Wrestling Federation
  - IWF Heavyweight Championship (1 time)
- International World Class Championship Wrestling
  - IWCCW Heavyweight Championship (1 time)
- World of Unpredictable Wrestling
  - WUW Trophy Championship (1 time)
- Pro Wrestling Illustrated
  - PWI ranked him #216 of the 500 best singles wrestlers in the PWI 500 in 1992
