= Lady Blossom =

British professional wrestling manager

Personal information
- Born: Jean Clarke; 4 April 1959 (age 67) Brentwood, Essex, England
- Spouses: Billy Jack Haynes (m. 1983; div. 1984) Stone Cold Steve Austin (m. 1992; div. 1999)
- Children: 3

Professional wrestling career
- Ring name(s): Jeanie Adams; Lady Blossom
- Trained by: Chris Adams
- Debut: 1979
- Retired: 1991

Jeanie Clarke (born 4 April 1959) is an English former professional wrestling manager and author. She is best known for her appearances with the American professional wrestling promotions the United States Wrestling Association and World Championship Wrestling from 1990 to 1991 under the respective ring names Jeanie Adams and Lady Blossom as the valet for "Stunning" Steve Austin. In 2016, Clarke released her autobiography Through the Shattered Glass.

== Early life ==
Clarke originally worked as a model. She travelled to the United States alongside her then-boyfriend, professional wrestler Chris Adams. The couple split up in the early 1980s, and in 1990 Clarke began a relationship with wrestler "Stunning" Steve Austin.

== Professional wrestling career ==
=== Joint Promotions (1979–1981) ===
In 1979, Clarke started her wrestling career as a ringside second for her then-boyfriend Chris Adams for the British-based company Joint Promotions. In November 1980, listing magazine TVTimes published a feature on 25 years of wrestling on ITV which included an article in which Clarke - along with the wives of wrestlers Mick McManus, Jackie Pallo and Bruno Elrington - together discussed the trials and tribulations of being the partner of a wrestler. She took a hiatus from wrestling.

=== World Class Championship Wrestling / United States Wrestling Association (1990–1991) ===
In 1990, Clarke's by then ex-boyfriend Adams suggested to her that she should join Dallas, making her return to wrestling for the Texas-based promotion World Class Championship Wrestling and the Memphis, Tennessee-based United States Wrestling Association as a valet for "Stunning" Steve Austin. Clarke was billed as Chris' ex-wife "Jeanie Adams" to add an extra dimension to his feud with Austin, a wrestler he had trained at his wrestling school at the Sportatorium. During later bouts between Austin and Adams, Clarke would often catfight with Adams' valet and then-wife, Toni Adams. Clarke also wrestled Adams in a number of intergender tag team matches and a high-profile singles match at the Sportatorium. The original idea of the angle came about in the beginning of 1986 when Adams began his storyline feud with Gino Hernandez.

In 1991, Austin and Clarke left WCCW and the USWA and would later join World Championship Wrestling.

=== World Championship Wrestling (1991) ===
In 1991, Austin was hired by World Championship Wrestling, where Vivacious Veronica became his valet. After several weeks, Clarke was hired to replace Vivacious Veronica. She was given the name by Dusty Rhodes, who said it was because her "chest was blossoming out of her top". Lady Blossom debuted on 1 June 1991 episode of WCW Worldwide by helping Austin defeat Bobby Eaton for the WCW World Television Championship by scratching Eaton in the eyes with her fingernails.

The duo did not have a distinctive gimmick, but they tried to portray themselves as being a couple from high society. Austin came down to the ring in an extravagant robe, whereas Lady Blossom frequently donned a luxurious cleavage-baring evening gown. In a sharp contrast to her time in World Class Championship Wrestling, Lady Blossom did not get an opportunity to speak much on camera—she spoke on camera on less than a handful of occasions throughout her WCW tenure and with a prominent Essex girl accent, at odds with her high society image. Blossom used her actions instead of her words as she did not hesitate to involve herself in Austin's matches in order for him to win and retain his WCW Television title. Blossom frequently interfered in his matches, although her interference backfired from time to time, and she occasionally took bumps.

On one occasion, Lady Blossom hopped onto the ring apron in an attempt to distract the referee from the action in the ring. As she was arguing with the referee, Tracy Smothers inadvertently ran into her just as Austin had moved out of the way. Smothers' collision with Blossom jostled her and she fell to the floor mat a few moments later. Also, Lady Blossom constantly interfered in Austin's TV title matches with P. N. News and thus he retained his title again due to her interference. Right when the 10-minute time limit was drawing near, Blossom interfered in the match just as Austin was about to be pinned, thus causing a disqualification. Blossom's most frequent method of a disrupting a match was to jump on the back of Austin's opponent just as he was about to be pinned. She then scratched Austin's opponent's face with her fingernails. Another instance in which Lady Blossom's interference backfired took place in August 1991 on an episode of WCW Power Hour during a TV title match pitting Austin and Ron Simmons. Simmons was on the verge of victory in the match, but Lady Blossom entered the ring and jumped on his back to cause a disqualification.

For a string of weeks in October 1991, both Blossom and Austin did an angle involving a pair of brass knuckles. During Austin's matches, Lady Blossom pulled out of a pair of brass knuckles that was underhandedly hidden underneath her cleavage and tucked inside one of the cups of her bra. When the referee's attention was drawn elsewhere, she pulled the brass knuckles out of her bra and hand the weapon over to Austin so that he could use them on his opponent. Unbeknownst to the official, Austin struck his opponent with the knuckles and then quickly handed them back over to Blossom. Lady Blossom then cleverly concealed the brass knuckles inside of her bra again and behave as if nothing ever happened. Austin then pinned his unconscious opponent for the victory. The couple's shenanigans worked for a few weeks, but they were caught within due time. At the conclusion of a match between Steve Austin and PN News on WCW Saturday Night, Lady Blossom helped Austin cheat to win yet again. After the match, an enraged Dustin Rhodes came down to ringside to explain to the referee that Austin had cheated in his match by striking his opponent with a pair of brass knuckles and that the weapon was hidden inside of Lady Blossom's dress. Both Blossom and Austin egged Rhodes on to prove to the referee that they had cheated in the match, but he reluctantly refused to place his hand down her dress knowing the potential sexual harassment issues his action caused. Moments later, Madusa arrived on to the scene to confront the perpetrators and attempt to verify Rhodes' claims. Madusa then did what Rhodes was much too uncomfortable to do by literally taking matters into her own hands and sticking her hand inside of Blossom's dress. Madusa was quickly able to pull the concealed weapon out of Blossom's dress and show off her discovery to the crowd. Considering that the referee now had visible evidence that Austin did in fact cheat to win the match, he reversed his decision in favor of News.

Blossom retired from professional wrestling in late 1991 after becoming pregnant with her second daughter. She made her final appearance with WCW on 19 November 1991 at Clash of the Champions XVII, accompanying Austin to ringside for his title defense against P. N. News.

== Personal life ==
Clarke had a relationship with professional wrestler Chris Adams for five years, with the couple having a daughter, Jade. Clarke and Adams split up in the early 1980s. Contrary to the wrestling storyline, the two were never actually married in real life. In 1983, in order to stay in the United States, Clarke married professional wrestler William "Billy Jack" Haynes, with the couple later divorcing. In 1990, Clarke began a relationship with professional wrestler Steve Austin. The couple married on 18 December 1992 and had two daughters, Stephanie Britt (born 1992) and Cassidy Skye (born 1996). Clarke and Austin divorced in 1999, with Clarke and her children later returning to the United Kingdom in 2001.

Clarke is credited by Austin with helping him develop his "Stone Cold" persona. While he was contemplating a change in ring name from "The Ringmaster", she told him to drink his tea before it got "stone cold", and suggested he use the nickname. She was also instrumental in the creation of the "Austin 3:16" catchphrase.

On 4 May 2016, Clarke released her autobiography, Through the Shattered Glass, through Amazon.

In August 2016, Clarke was presented with an award at the Annual British Wrestlers Reunion in Kent, England.

== Bibliography ==
- Jeanie Clarke; Bradley Craig; Neil Cameron (4 May 2016). Through The Shattered Glass. CreateSpace Independent Publishing. ISBN 978-1530387014.
