= Bruno Elrington =

British professional wrestler (1929–1993)

Personal information
- Born: Bruno Elrington; 13 December 1929 Barnsley, Yorkshire, England
- Died: 19 July 1993 (aged 63) England

Professional wrestling career
- Ring name: Big Bruno Elrington
- Billed height: 6'6
- Billed weight: 230 lb (104 kg)
- Debut: late 1950s
- Retired: 1980

Bruno Elrington (13 December 1929 – 19 July 1993) was an English professional wrestler and actor. Known for his work in Joint Promotions in the United Kingdom in the 1960s. His physical appearance at 6"6 and he had a big bushy beard.

== Early life ==
Elrington was born in Barnsley, Yorkshire, England, in 1929. He served in the British Army and was a boxing champion within the forces.

== Career ==
Elrington began his professional wrestling career in the United Kingdom for Joint Promotions and Dale Martin Promotions. In 1964, he fought Indian wrestler Dara Singh in India, drawing 57,000 fans and ending in a no-contest.

In February 1967, he won the One Night Tournament, defeating Sean Regan in King's Lynn, Norfolk. In 1969, he won the Royal Albert Hall Tournament Trophy, defeating Tibor Szakacs in the finals. He lost to Andre the Giant that same year at Royal Albert Hall.

Also in 1969, he went to Japan to work for International Wrestling Enterprise. He returned to England and finished his wrestling career there.

Wimbledon wrestling enthusiast Palais Fan recalled: “He was never less than excellent in his role as the bad-tempered, scary big guy, who was there to fight. His barrel chest, beard and height set him apart from the average heavyweight, and he gave the impression of being a great bloke to have on your side at a fight at a pub, on a Saturday night.”

He retired from wrestling in 1980.

== Later life and death ==
After wrestling, he trained wrestlers Johnny Wilson, Peter Wilson and John Kowalski.

On 19 July 1993, Elrington died at 63.

== Championships and accomplishments ==
- British Championships
  - Southern England Championship
  - One Night Tournament (1967)
  - Royal Albert Hall Tournament Trophy (1969)

== Filmography ==
=== Movies ===
Year	Film	Role	Notes
1976	The New Avengers	Choy	
1969	Nine Ages of Nakedness	The Leader	
1968	The Touchables	Bruno	
1965	Boxer	Wrestler	
