= Frank Hickey (wrestler) =

American professional wrestler (1915–1993)

Personal information
- Born: Franklin Jewel Hickey; March 10, 1915 San Francisco, California, U.S.
- Died: December 8, 1993 (aged 78) Albany, Kentucky, U.S.

Professional wrestling career
- Ring name(s): Frank Hickey; Spaceman; Bozo Brown; Bozo Miller; The Great Bozo; Night Terror; El Diablo; Frank Brown
- Billed height: 5 ft 10 in (178 cm)
- Billed weight: 243 lb (110 kg)
- Billed from: "Outer Space"
- Debut: 1941
- Retired: May 15, 1993

Franklin Jewel Hickey (March 10, 1915 – December 8, 1993) was an American professional wrestler.

== Professional wrestling career ==
Hickey began working in New York City for the World Wide Wrestling Federation in 1964. He wrestled against Bruno Sammartino, Bobo Brazil, Bill Watts, Pedro Morales, Arnold Skaaland, and Gorilla Monsoon. In 1974 he retired from wrestling.

In 1993, he wrestled in two matches for the United States Wrestling Association taking place in Memphis on May 10 and May 15. In both matches, he teamed up with Brian Christopher, but lost to Koko B. Ware and Frank Morrell.

== Death ==
On December 8, 1993, Hickey died in Albany, Kentucky. He was 78 years old.

== Championships and accomplishments ==
- Jack Pfefer Promotions
  - World Heavyweight Championship (Jack Pfefer version) (1 time)
