= Funking Conservatory =

Professional wrestling school

- Founded: 1991
- Style: American professional wrestling
- Headquarters: Ocala, Florida
- Founder: Dory Funk Jr.
- Sister: !Bang! Funkin' Dojo

The Funking Conservatory is a professional wrestling school founded by Dory Funk Jr. and established in 1991. It started as a six-day camp, but it later expanded to a three-week program. In 2001, it began running a professional wrestling promotion called "!Bang!" Members of the school and promotion had a chance to appear on its television show !Bang! TV.

== School ==
In 1999, while he was in semi-retirement, Dory Funk Jr. decided to open a professional wrestling camp to train professional wrestlers. It had a branch affiliated with the World Wrestling Federation called the "Funkin' Dojo."

The Funking Conservatory began as a six-day camp, and it teaches wrestlers how to perform promos, conditioning, and weight training. They also train professional wrestling referees. The school accepts students starting at 14 years old. It also trains wrestlers in hardcore wrestling—focusing on safety—and includes a hardcore match in every show.

It later expanded to a three-week program. In 2001, it began running a professional wrestling promotion called !Bang!. Members of the school and promotion had a chance to appear on its television show, !Bang! TV. Funk's wife Marti is a producer on the show in addition to acting as the photographer, videographer, and social media director for the school.

In 2004, the school moved to the Dory Funk Arena in Ocala, Florida. It consists of a ring, sound stage, and locker rooms.

== !Bang! TV ==
The promotion's !BANG! TV television tapings are held in the Dory Funk Arena on Saturday nights. Billed as "the most exciting pro-wrestling show on the air" and hosted by Dory Funk Jr., !Bang! TV transmitted weekly on WOGX TV-51, and also My65. A special one-off edition of !BANG! TV was shown on The Wrestling Channel to viewers in the United Kingdom and Ireland. The show also transmits online via their website.

== Championships ==
=== Current ===
- Funking Conservatory World Heavyweight Championship
- Funking Conservatory Tag Team Championship
- Funking Conservatory United States Championship
- Funking Conservatory Florida Heavyweight Championship
- Funking Conservatory Television Championship
- Funking Conservatory Hardcore Championship
- Funking Conservatory Light Heavyweight Championship
- Funking Conservatory Women's Championship

=== Retired, defunct, and inactive championships ===
- Funking Conservatory International Championship
- Funking Conservatory European Championship
- Funking Conservatory Premium Championship
- Funking Conservatory Queen of Hardcore Championship

== See also ==
- List of independent wrestling promotions in the United States
