= Adam Page =

American professional wrestler (born 1991)

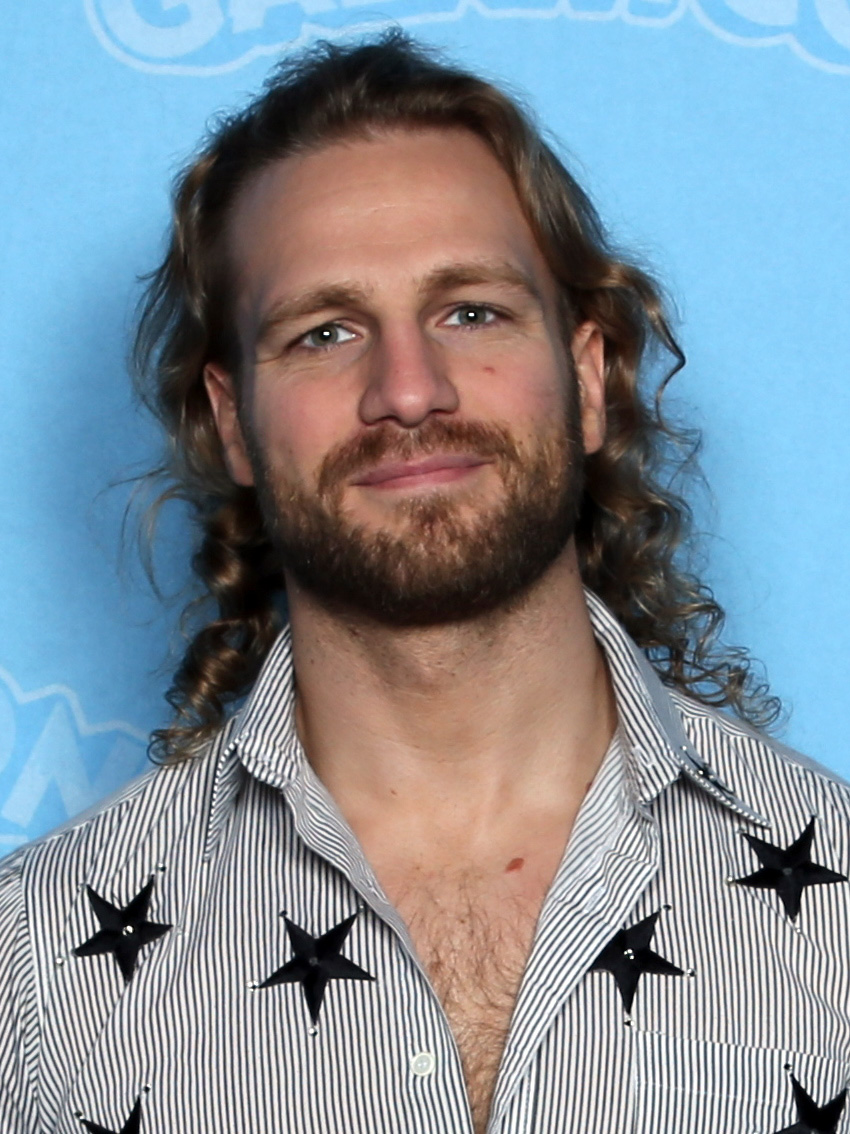
- Page in July 2022

Personal information
- Born: Stephen Blake Woltz; July 27, 1991 (age 35) Halifax County, Virginia, U.S.
- Education: Virginia Tech (BA)
- Spouse: Amanda Woltz (m. 2016)
- Children: 2

Professional wrestling career
- Ring name(s): Adam Page "Hangman" Adam Page
- Billed height: 6 ft 1 in (185 cm)
- Billed weight: 229 lb (104 kg)
- Billed from: Aaron's Creek, Virginia
- Trained by: Jimmy Valiant
- Debut: May 24, 2008

Stephen Blake Woltz (born July 27, 1991), better known by his ring name "Hangman" Adam Page, is an American professional wrestler. As of January 2019, he is signed to All Elite Wrestling (AEW).

Woltz began his career on the independent circuit in 2008. He began to appear in Ring of Honor (ROH) in 2011, staying there for seven years. In 2016, he joined the villainous Bullet Club stable and began to gain prominence. It was at this time that he adopted the cowboy-inspired persona of "Hangman" Adam Page. Along with his stablemates The Young Bucks, he won the ROH World Six-Man Tag Team Championship, and began working with Japanese promotion New Japan Pro-Wrestling (NJPW) due to its agreement with ROH. In 2018, he was named as a member of the Bullet Club sub-group The Elite.

In 2019, Page joined Kenny Omega, Cody Rhodes, and The Young Bucks in leaving NJPW and ROH to establish AEW with the financial backing of Tony and Shahid Khan, becoming one of AEW's core talents from its inception. At AEW's inaugural event, Double or Nothing in May 2019, he won a Casino Battle Royale to receive a shot to become the inaugural AEW World Champion, but was defeated by Chris Jericho at All Out that September. In January 2020, he won the AEW World Tag Team Championship with Kenny Omega, whom he would defeat for the AEW World Championship at Full Gear in November 2021. He captured the championship for a second time by defeating Jon Moxley at All In: Texas in July 2025. In January 2026 after winning the AEW World Trios Championship with JetSpeed ("Speedball" Mike Bailey and "The Jet" Kevin Knight), the trio known together as Jet Set Rodeo, he became the second wrestler to complete the AEW Triple Crown. He has headlined several AEW pay-per-view events, including AEW's major flagship annual event , All In (2025). His feud with Swerve Strickland considered as one of the best feuds in professional wrestling history .

== Early life ==
Stephen Blake Woltz was born on July 27, 1991, in the small community of Aaron's Creek in Halifax County, Virginia. He is the nephew of George Woltz, best known for co-creating Virginia's tourist slogan "Virginia is for Lovers". He graduated from Halifax County High School in 2009. He later graduated from Virginia Tech, where he earned a BA in communications in two years. During his early wrestling career, he worked as a high school journalism and graphic design teacher for five years, and stepped away from teaching when he became a full-time wrestler with New Japan Pro-Wrestling in May 2016.

== Professional wrestling career ==
=== Early career (2008–2011) ===
After training under Jimmy Valiant, Woltz debuted on the American independent circuit under the ring name Adam Page on May 24, 2008. In January 2011, he won his first championship, the CWF Mid-Atlantic Tag Team Championship with Jason Blade. The following year, he became CWF Mid-Atlantic Heavyweight Champion. Over the next several years, he wrestled for various regional promotions, winning multiple titles.

=== New Japan Pro-Wrestling and Ring of Honor (2011–2019) ===
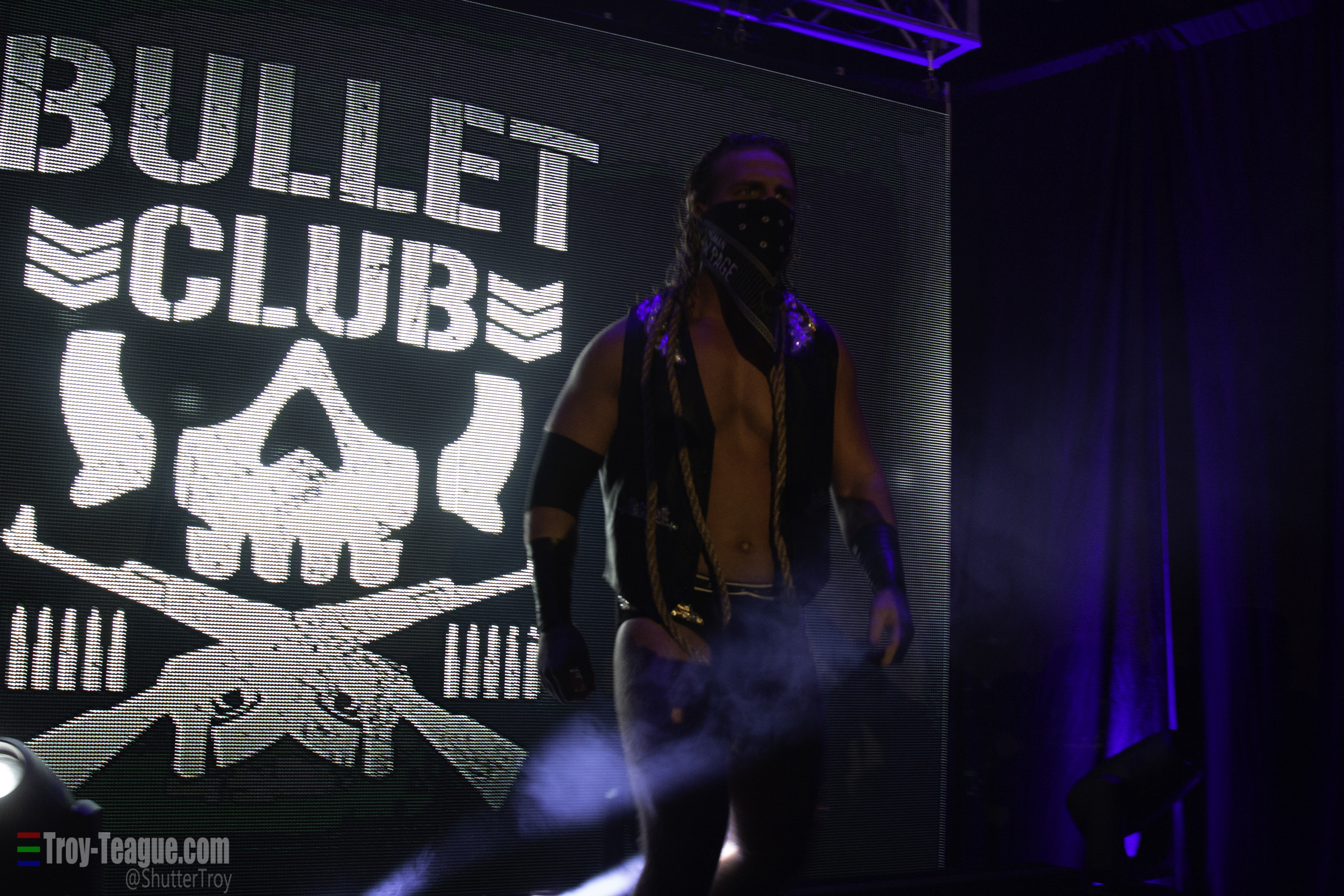
Page making his way to the ring at a Ring of Honor event in May 2018

In 2011, Page began working with Ring of Honor (ROH), becoming a regular competitor by 2013. Initially used in undercard matches, he gained more prominence in 2014 after joining the veteran-led stable The Decade. Page aligned himself with Bullet Club in 2016. During an angle on the War of the Worlds tour, he attacked Chris Sabin with a hangman's noose, earning the nickname "Hangman".

Page's association with Bullet Club elevated his position within both ROH and New Japan Pro-Wrestling (NJPW). In ROH, he was involved in several mid-card feuds and, in August 2017, won the ROH World Six-Man Tag Team Championship with The Young Bucks. He later feuded with Punishment Martinez over the ROH World Television Championship and reached the finals of ROH's International Cup tournament in 2018.

Simultaneously, Page became a regular in NJPW as part of Bullet Club, appearing in events such as Dominion 6.19 in 2016 and G1 Special in USA in 2017, and tournaments such as the 2016, 2017 and 2018 World Tag League (alongside Yujiro Takahashi), and the G1 Climax in 2018. He challenged Jay White for the IWGP United States Heavyweight Championship at Strong Style Evolved, though he was unsuccessful.

On September 1, 2018, Page appeared at All In, an independently produced event promoted by Cody and The Young Bucks. He defeated Joey Janela in a Chicago Street Fight. Page would later join The Elite, a Bullet Club sub-group. His last appearance in NJPW was on the Wrestle Kingdom 13 pre-show where Page, Marty Scurll and Takahashi were the first team eliminated from the NEVER Openweight 6-Man Tag Team Championship number one contender Gauntlet match.

=== All Elite Wrestling (2019–present) ===
==== The Elite (2019–2020) ====
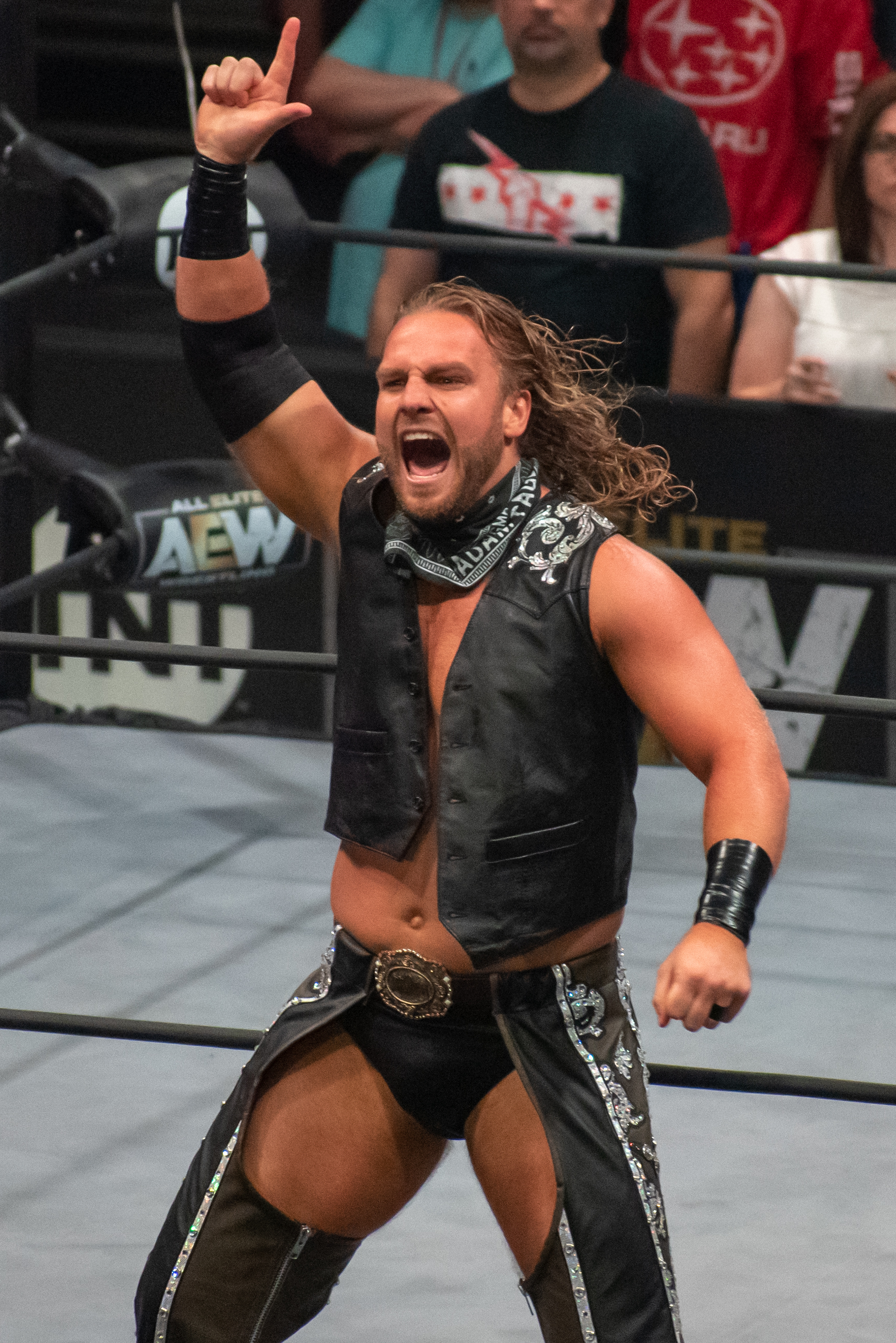
Page appearing on an episode of Dynamite, October 2019

In January 2019, Adam Page was announced as one of the first signees of the newly established All Elite Wrestling (AEW), joining alongside other members of The Elite (Cody, Kenny Omega and The Young Bucks). He was originally scheduled to face Pac at AEW's inaugural pay-per-view event, Double or Nothing on May 25; however, the match was canceled due to creative differences. Page instead entered the Casino Battle Royale as a surprise entrant, where he last eliminated MJF to earn a future shot at the AEW World Championship. At All Out on August 31, Page was defeated by Chris Jericho in a match to crown the inaugural AEW World Champion.

On the premiere episode of Dynamite, Page lost to Pac, but avenged the loss at Full Gear on November 9. Shortly thereafter, Page began teaming with Omega. On the January 22, 2020, episode of Dynamite, the duo defeated SoCal Uncensored (Frankie Kazarian and Scorpio Sky) to win the AEW World Tag Team Championship—the first title change in AEW history. They successfully defended the titles against The Young Bucks at Revolution on February 29. During their reign, Page began displaying signs of dissension and isolation from The Elite in storyline.

The Elite entered a feud with The Inner Circle, culminating in a Stadium Stampede match at Double or Nothing on May 23, which The Elite won along with Matt Hardy. However, storyline tensions within the group escalated, and Page was removed from The Elite by The Young Bucks after costing them a tag team match. At All Out on September 5, Omega and Page lost the tag titles to FTR, ending their reign at 228 days. The team subsequently disbanded.

==== Singles competition (2020–2023) ====
Page entered a tournament in October to determine a new number one contender for the AEW World Championship. He defeated Colt Cabana and Wardlow to reach the finals, where he was defeated by Omega at Full Gear on November 7.

In early 2021, Page was involved in a storyline with The Dark Order, who attempted to recruit him. Although he declined their offer, they continued to support him during his matches. At Revolution on March 7, Page defeated Matt Hardy, and at Double or Nothing on May 30, he scored a victory over Brian Cage. Page then resumed his rivalry with Omega, who had since become AEW World Champion. Page and The Dark Order faced The Elite in a ten-man tag match at Fight for the Fallen on July 28, but were defeated, costing them future title opportunities. Page was later written off television to take paternity leave.

Page returned at Dynamite's second anniversary on October 7, winning a Casino Ladder Match to secure a future title shot. At Full Gear on November 13, he defeated Omega to win the AEW World Championship. His first title defense against Bryan Danielson at Winter Is Coming on December 15 resulted in a 60-minute time-limit draw. Page won the rematch on the January 5, 2022, episode of Dynamite. He later retained the title against Lance Archer in a Texas Deathmatch on the February 9 episode of Dynamite and against Adam Cole at Revolution on March 6, despite interference from reDRagon. Page defeated Cole once again in a subsequent Texas Deathmatch on the April 15 episode of Rampage. He lost the AEW World Championship to CM Punk at Double or Nothing on May 29, ending his 197-day reign.

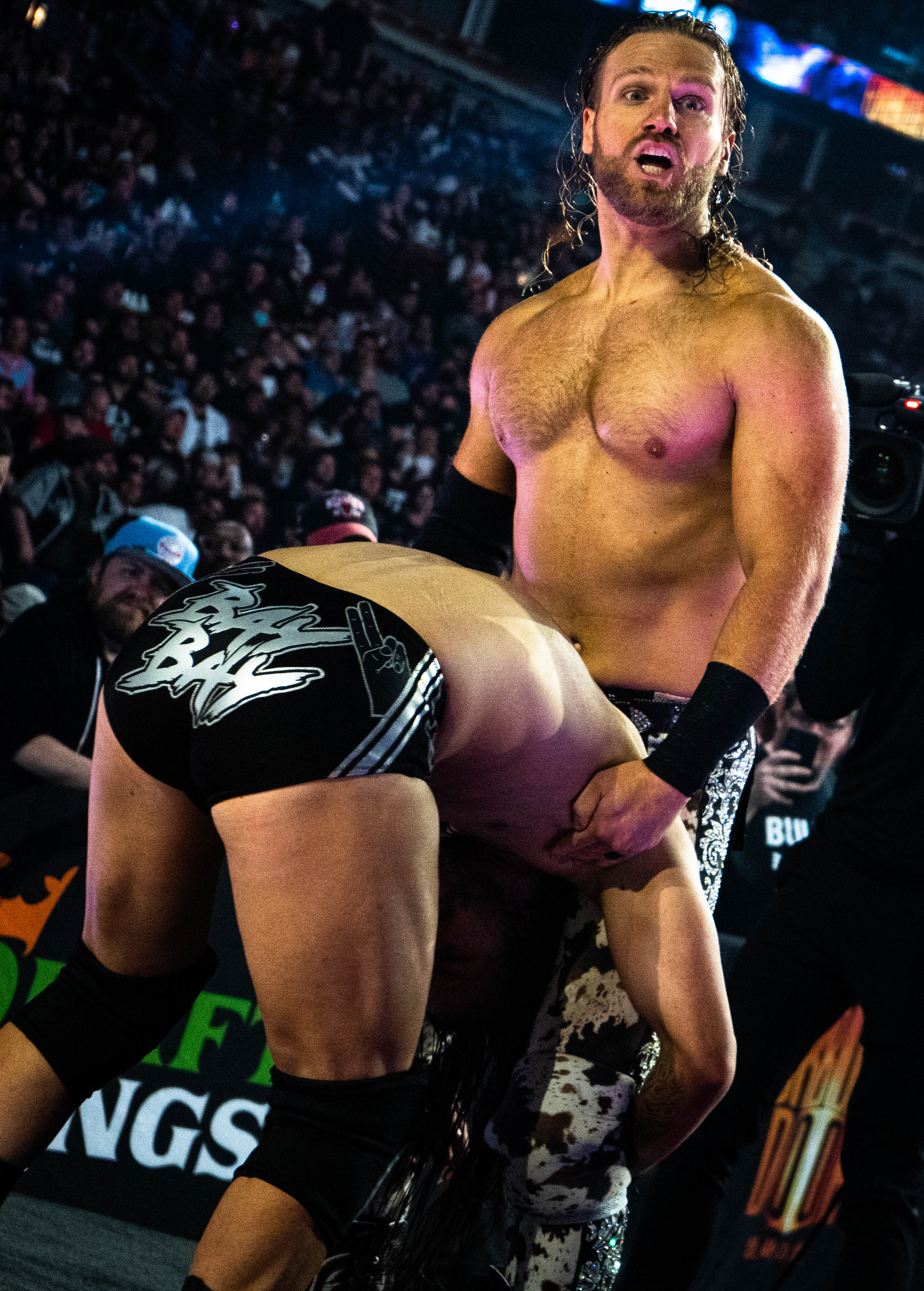
Page about to give Adam Cole a powerbomb at Forbidden Door in June 2022

Page returned on the June 8 episode of Dynamite, defeating David Finlay and expressing interest in the IWGP World Heavyweight Championship. After Jay White won the title from Kazuchika Okada, a four-way match between Page, Cole, White, and Okada was announced for Forbidden Door on June 26, where Page was unsuccessful. He later competed in the AEW World Trios Championship tournament with Dark Order members Alex Reynolds and John Silver, reaching the finals at All Out on September 4, where they lost to The Elite. Page also took part in the Grand Slam Tournament of Champions but was eliminated in the opening round by Bryan Danielson.

Page won the Golden Ticket Battle Royale at Grand Slam and challenged Jon Moxley for the AEW World Championship on October 18, but suffered a legitimate concussion during the match, which was stopped prematurely. He returned on November 30, reigniting his feud with Moxley, who was no longer champion. This culminated in a victory for Page on January 11, 2023, and a subsequent win in a Texas Deathmatch at Revolution on March 5, where he became the first wrestler in AEW to make Moxley submit.

==== Re-joining The Elite (2023–2024) ====
In May, Page rejoined The Elite to feud with the Blackpool Combat Club (BCC), leading to an Anarchy in the Arena match at Double or Nothing on May 28, which BCC won. At Forbidden Door on June 25, Page teamed with The Young Bucks, Eddie Kingston, and Tomohiro Ishii to defeat BCC, Konosuke Takeshita, and Shota Umino. At Blood & Guts on July 19, The Elite, alongside Kota Ibushi, defeated BCC, Pac, and Takeshita in the namesake match. On August 2, it was announced that Page, Omega, and The Young Bucks had re-signed with AEW. On August 27 at All In, Page, Kenny Omega and Kota Ibushi were defeated by Bullet Club Gold (Jay White and Juice Robinson) and Konosuke Takeshita in a trios match.

At All Out on September 3, Page won the Over Budget Charity Battle Royale. He then entered a feud with Swerve Strickland, which led to a match at WrestleDream on October 1, where Strickland emerged victorious. During this time, Page and The Young Bucks won the ROH World Six-Man Tag Team Championship but lost the titles to the Mogul Embassy on the November 1 episode of Dynamite. Page and Strickland's feud culminated in a Texas Deathmatch at Full Gear on November 18, which Strickland won. The match garnered mainstream attention due to its violent content, including a controversial moment where Page drank Strickland's blood. Page later defeated Roderick Strong at Winter Is Coming, but was attacked backstage by the masked "Devil" character and his associates.

On the February 7, 2024 episode of Dynamite, Page faced Strickland in a match to determine the next challenger for the AEW World Championship. After the match ended in a time-limit draw, both were added to a title match against Samoa Joe at Revolution on March 3, which Joe won. Following the event, Page was suspended by The Young Bucks after attacking referees turning heel in the process, in the kayfabe storyline.

Page returned in July as a surprise entrant in the Owen Hart Cup, defeating Jeff Jarrett in the quarterfinal round and Jay White in the semi-final round, advancing to the finals before losing to Bryan Danielson. During this period, Page began exhibiting more aggressive and villainous traits. Though initially reluctant, he agreed to team with The Elite for Blood & Guts, where they were defeated by Team AEW (Swerve Strickland, Mark Briscoe, Darby Allin, and The Acclaimed). After Blood & Guts, Page quietly left The Elite for a second time.

==== Various feuds (2024–2025) ====
At All In on August 25, after Page failed to win the Casino Gauntlet match, he later attempted to interfere in the AEW World Championship bout between Strickland and Danielson, but was stopped by security. On the September 4 episode of Dynamite, Page appeared in a vignette at Strickland's childhood home, which he set ablaze. Page defeated Strickland at All Out on September 7 in a lights out steel cage match, concluding their year-long rivalry.

Following his victory, Page began a feud with Jay White, losing to him at WrestleDream on October 12 and Full Gear on November 23. He then competed for the AEW World Championship at Worlds End on December 28 in a four-way match also involving White, Moxley, and Orange Cassidy, but was unsuccessful. In late 2024, Page began a feud with Christopher Daniels, which culminated in a Texas Deathmatch on the January 18, 2025 (taped January 16) Maximum Carnage special episode of Collision, which Page won. On February 12, 2025, Page turned face by saving Dustin Rhodes from an attack by MJF. At Revolution on March 9, he defeated MJF.

==== Championship reigns (2025–present) ====
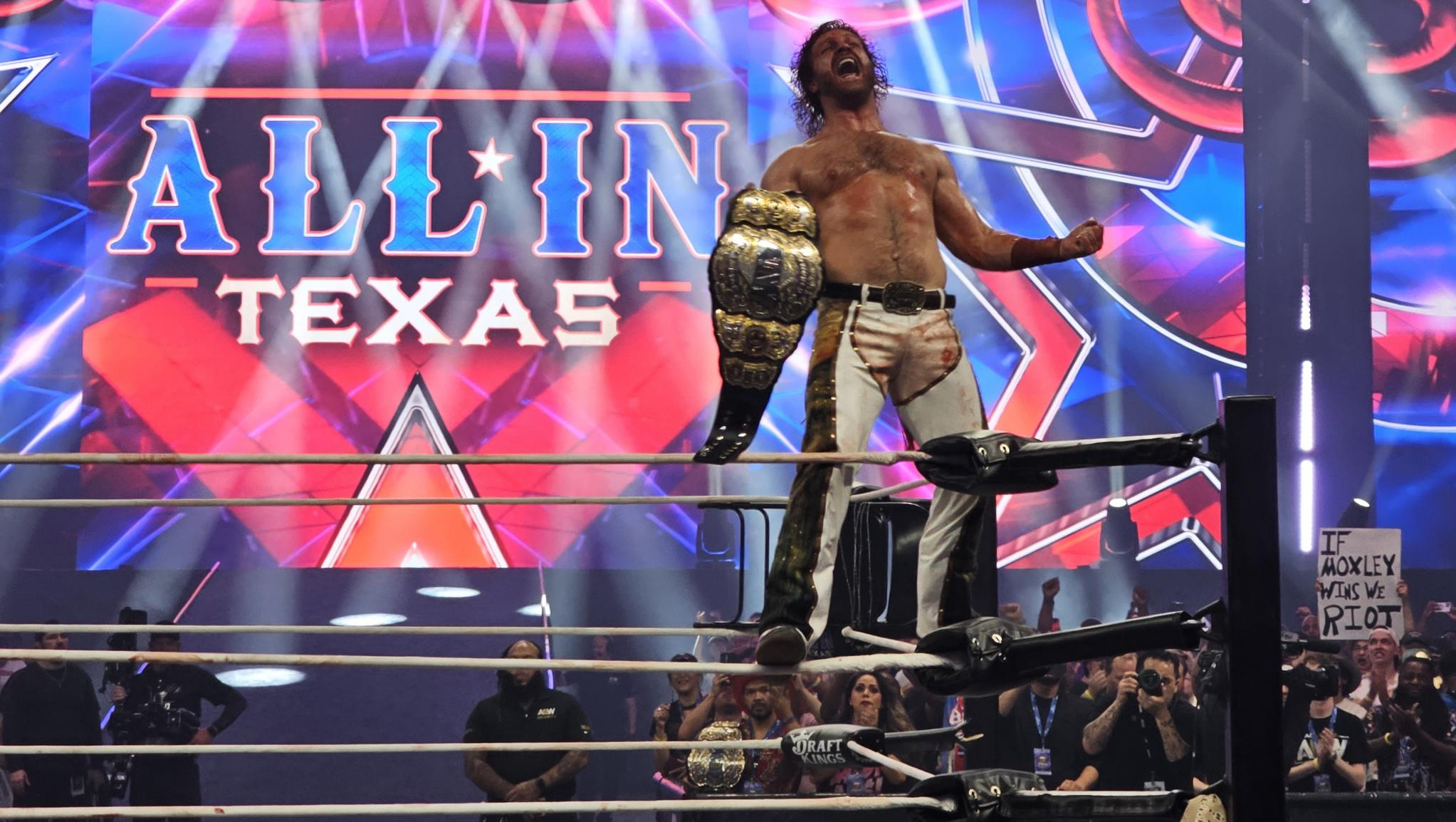
Page celebrating his second AEW World Championship win at All In in July 2025

Page entered the men's bracket of the Owen Hart Cup. In the quarterfinal round at Dynamite: Spring BreakThru on April 16, Page defeated "wild card" mystery entrant Josh Alexander. On the April 30 episode of Dynamite, Page defeated Kyle Fletcher in the semi-final round. Page would go on to defeat Will Ospreay in the finals to win the tournament on May 25 at Double or Nothing, earning a title match against Moxley for the AEW World Championship at All In. On July 2 at Dynamite 300, Page and Moxley's match at All In was turned into a Texas Deathmatch. At All In, Page defeated Moxley to capture his second AEW World Championship, after receiving assistance from his former rival Swerve Strickland. On the July 30 episode of Dynamite, Page successfully defended his title against Moxley in a rematch with the stipulation of everyone being banned from ringside. Page made successful defences against MJF and Kyle Fletcher at Forbidden Door and All Out respectively. At WrestleDream on October 18, he retained the title against Samoa Joe, before being attacked by The Opps (Joe, Katsuyori Shibata and Powerhouse Hobbs). Page lost the title to Joe in a Steel Cage match at Full Gear on November 22 after interference from Hook, ending his second reign at 133 days. After the match, Page was rescued from an attack by Joe and the Opps by Swerve Strickland. On December 27 at Worlds End, Page failed to regain the title in a four-way match, which was won by MJF.

During the January 14, 2026, taping of Collision: Maximum Carnage, Page teamed with JetSpeed ("Speedball" Mike Bailey and "The Jet" Kevin Knight) to defeat The Opps and win the AEW World Trios Championship. AEW officially began recognizing this reign when the episode aired on tape delay on January 17. This also made Page the second AEW Triple Crown winner. The trio of JetSpeed and Page were officially named "Jet Set Rodeo". On February 14 at Grand Slam Australia, Page defeated Andrade El Idolo in a number one contender's match, earning an AEW World Championship opportunity at Revolution. On the February 18 episode of Dynamite, Page announced that, in exchange for his AEW World Championship match against reigning champion MJF at Revolution being contested under Texas Death match rules, he would never again challenge for the title if he lost. Jet Set Rodeo subsequently lost the AEW World Trios Championship on the March 4 episode of Dynamite to Don Callis Family (Kazuchika Okada, Kyle Fletcher, and Mark Davis) thanks to interference from MJF, ending their reign at 49 days (46 days as recognized by AEW). On March 15 at Revolution, Page failed to defeat MJF for the AEW World Championship. As a result of the added stipulation, Page (kayfabe) verbally agreed with AEW president Tony Khan to never challenge for the AEW World Championshp ever again. After Revolution, it was reported that Page would be taking time off.

After a four-month hiatus, Page returned on the July 11 episode of Collision, where he reaffirmed that he would honor the stipulation stemming from his AEW World Championship match at Revolution by never challenging for the title again. Instead, he announced that he would pursue other championships within AEW. On August 5 at Grand Slam Mexico, Page teamed with Brodido (Brody King and Bandido) to defeat The Demand (Ricochet, Bishop Kaun, and Toa Liona) to win the AEW World Trios Championship, but lost the titles 25 days later at All In on August 30, in a Trios Roulette Royale to Swerve Strickland and The New Level (Kofi and Austin Creed). They failed to regain the titles from Strickland and the New Level at All Out on September 26. On September 30 at A Tribute to Pac, Page, who was Pac's first ever rival in AEW, rejoined The Elite and teamed with Omega and the Young Bucks for one night only to defeat The Don Callis Family (Kyle Fletcher, Kevin Knight, Trent Beretta, and Rocky Romero). At WrestleDream on October 17, Page and Brodido won the World Trios Championships for a second time after defeating Strickland and The New Level in a two out of three falls match 2-1. They lost the titles back to Strckland and New Level in a Texas Death match at Full Gear on November 14, ending their second reign at 28 days.

== Personal life ==
Woltz married Amanda, with whom he has two children, in 2016.

== Championships and accomplishments ==
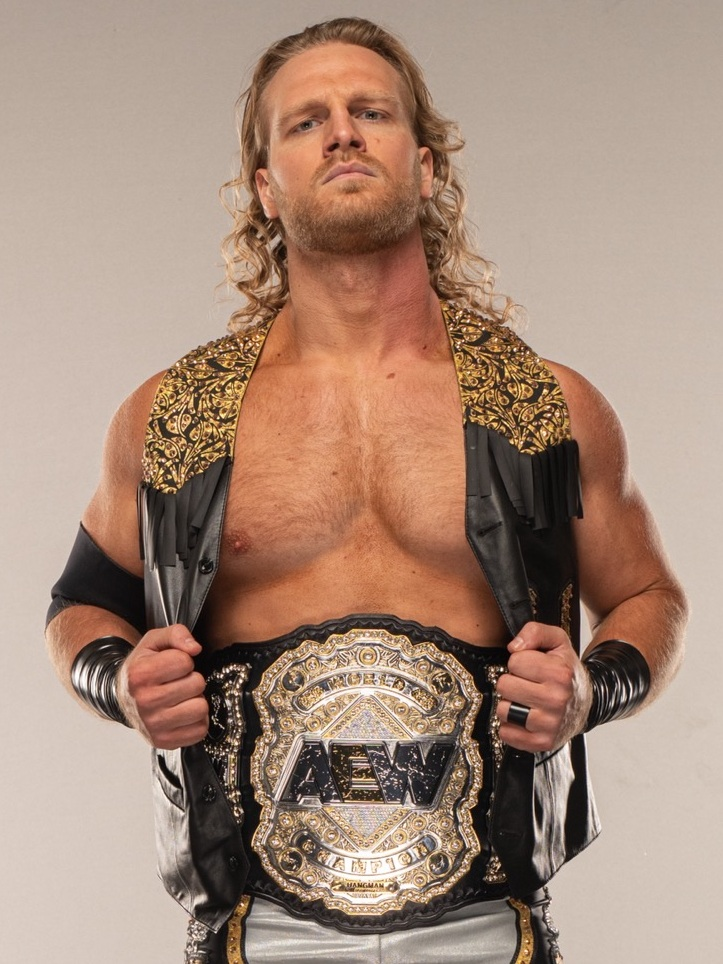
Page is a two-time AEW World Champion

and a three-time AEW World Trios Champion alongside Brody King and Bandido (pictured).

- All Elite Wrestling
  - AEW World Championship (2 times)
  - AEW World Tag Team Championship (1 time) – with Kenny Omega
  - AEW World Trios Championship (3 times) – with Mike Bailey and Kevin Knight (1) and Bandido and Brody King (2)
  - Men's Casino Battle Royale (2019)
  - Second AEW Triple Crown Champion
  - Men's Casino Ladder Match (2021)
  - Over Budget Charity Battle Royale (2023)
  - Men's Owen Hart Cup (2025)
  - Dynamite Award (2 times)
    - Bleacher Report PPV Moment of the Year (2021) – Stadium Stampede match (The Elite vs. The Inner Circle) – Double or Nothing (May 23)
    - Biggest Beatdown (2022) – Hangman Adam Page goes 60 with Bryan Danielson
- Carolina Wrestling Federation Mid-Atlantic
  - CWF Mid-Atlantic Heavyweight Championship (1 time)
  - CWF Mid-Atlantic Tag Team Championship (1 time) – with Jason Blade
- Inside The Ropes Magazine
  - Ranked No. 8 of the top 50 wrestlers in the world in the ITR 50 in 2020
- Premiere Wrestling Xperience
  - PWX Tag Team Championship (2 times) – with Corey Hollis
- Sports Illustrated
  - Male Wrestler of the Year (2025)
  - Storyline of the Year (2025)
  - Rivalry of the Year (2025) vs. Jon Moxley
- Pro Wrestling Illustrated
  - Match of the Year (2020) with Kenny Omega vs The Young Bucks at Revolution
  - Ranked No. 4 of the top 500 singles wrestlers in the PWI 500 in 2022 and 2025
  - Ranked No. 2 of the top 50 Tag Teams in the PWI Tag Team 50 in 2020 with Kenny Omega
- Pro Wrestling International
  - PWI International Trios Championship (2 times) – with Jason Blade and Jason Miller
- Ring of Honor
  - ROH World Six-Man Tag Team Championship (2 times) – with Matt Jackson and Nick Jackson
  - ROH Year-End Award (1 time)
    - Breakout Star of the Year (2017)
- WrestleForce
  - WrestleForce Tag Team Championship (1 time) – with Corey Hollis
- Pure Pro Wrestling
  - PPW Heavyweight Championship (1 time)
- Wrestling Observer Newsletter
  - Best on Interviews (2025)
  - Best Wrestling Maneuver (2021, 2025) Buckshot Lariat
  - Bruiser Brody Memorial Award (Best Brawler) (2024)
  - Feud of the Year (2021) vs. Kenny Omega
  - Feud of the Year (2025) vs. Jon Moxley
  - Most Improved (2018)
  - Pro Wrestling Match of the Year (2020) with Kenny Omega vs The Young Bucks at Revolution
