= CWF Mid-Atlantic Rising Generation League Championship =

Professional wrestling championship

Details
- Promotion: CWF Mid-Atlantic
- Date established: December 12, 2002
- Date retired: December 31, 2019

Other names
- FWA-Carolinas Rising Generation League Championship (2001 - 2004); AWA/CWF Mid-Atlantic Rising Generation League Championship (2004 - 2007)
Statistics
- First champion: Kamakazi Kid
- Final champion: Adrian Jackson
- Most reigns: Kool Jay and Dirty Daddy (2 reigns)
- Longest reign: Kool Jay (525 days)
- Shortest reign: Adrian Jackson (3 days)

The CWF Mid-Atlantic Rising Generation League Championship was a professional wrestling secondary championship in Carolina Wrestling Federation Mid-Atlantic (CWF Mid-Atlantic). It was first introduced by the promotion while an affiliate of the Frontier Wrestling Alliance (2001–2004) and later recognized by AWA Superstars (2005–2007). The title is traditionally defended in an annual tournament, typically held in December, although it has been occasionally defended in singles matches during the year. The title has switched hands in non-tournament bouts only twice, with the majority of the title changes occurring at the Rising Generation League Tournament. As of 2012, no champion has ever won the tournament more than once.

The inaugural champion was The Kamakazi Kid, who defeated Brass Munkey in a tournament final on December 12, 2002 to become the first FWA-Carolinas Rising Generation League Champion. The Kamakazi Kid and Ultra Dragon both hold the record for longest title reign at 378 days each. The Kamakazi Kid's first reign is considered one of the longest championship reigns in the promotion's history. Roo D. Lewis' only reign was the shortest in the history of the title lasting only 76 days. Overall, there have been 12 reigns shared between 12 wrestlers, with two vacancies.

== Title history ==
Key
No.	Overall reign number
Reign	Reign number for the specific champion
N/A	The information is not available or is unknown
+	Current reign is changing daily

No.	Champion	Championship change			Reign statistics		Notes	Ref.
No.	Champion	Date	Event	Location	Reign	Days	Notes	Ref.
1	Kamakazi Kid	December 14, 2002		Burlington, NC	1	378	Kamakazi Kid defeated Brass Munkey in a tournament final to become the first FWA-Carolinas Rising Generation League Champion.	
2	Kirby Mack	December 27, 2003	Battlecade IV (2003)	Burlington, NC	1	357	Kirby Mack defeated Kamakazi Kid in a tournament final.	
3	Kid Justice	December 18, 2004	Battlecade V (2004)	Burlington, NC	1	364	Kid Justice defeated Jesse Ortega in a tournament final.	
4	Ultra Dragon	December 17, 2005	Battlecade VI (2005)	Burlington, NC	1	378	Ultra Dragon defeated El Toro Rojo in a tournament final; Dragon had also defeated Kid Justice earlier in the tournament. That same year, the title was renamed the AWA Mid-Atlantic Rising Generation League Championship when the promotion became an affiliate for AWA Superstars.	
5	Roy Wilkins	December 30, 2006	Battlecade VII (2006)	Burlington, NC	1	351	Roy Wilkins defeated Cecil Scott, Jerry Wayne, and Justin Flash in a tournament final; officials ordered a Four Corner match among the final participants when Ultra Dragon was unable to participate. On July 29, 2007, the title was renamed the CWF Mid-Atlantic Rising Generation League Championship when the promotion's membership in AWA Superstars is terminated.	
6	Nick Richards	December 16, 2007	Battlecade VIII (2007)	Burlington, NC	1	371	Nick Richards defeated Roy Wilkins, Jerry Wayne, and El Mariachi in a four-way tournament final.	
7	Chiva Kid	December 21, 2008	Battlecade IX (2008)	Burlington, NC	1	181	Chiva Kid defeated Nick Richards in a tournament final.	
8	Matt Smith	June 20, 2009	Absolute Justice III (2009)	Burlington, NC	1	196		
9	Roo D. Lewis	January 2, 2010	Battlecade X (2009)	Burlington, NC	1	76	Roo D. Lewis defeated Trevor Lee in a tournament final.	
10	Trevor Lee	March 19, 2010	Elevated X-pectations (2010)	Burlington, NC	1	121		
11	Chase Dakota	July 18, 2010		Burlington, NC	1	139		
—	Vacated	December 4, 2010	Road to Battlecade (2010)	Burlington, NC	—	—	The championship is vacated when Chase Dakota is defeated by Jason Miller in the semi-finals.	
12	Jason Miller	December 18, 2010	Battlecade XI (2010)	Burlington, NC	1	322	Jason Miller defeated Mecha Mercenary in a tournament final.	
—	Vacated	November 5, 2011	Settling the Score (2011)	Burlington, NC	—	—	The championship is vacated when Jason Miller is defeated by Aric Andrews in the opening rounds; Miller lost via countout when he was knocked unconscious by Ric Converse after hitting him with a steel chair.	
13	Joe Black	December 17, 2011	Battlecade XII (2011)	Burlington, NC	1	223	Joe Black defeated Aric Andrews in a tournament final.	
14	Ben Tyler	July 28, 2012	No Excuses 2012	Gibsonville, NC	1	308		
15	Chris Lea	June 1, 2013	Explosive Elements 2013	Gibsonville, NC	1	210		
16	Chet Sterling	December 28, 2013	Battlecade XIV	Gibsonville, NC	1	140		
17	Charlie Weston	May 17, 2014	Homecoming 2014	Gibsonville, NC	1	188		
—	Vacated	November 22, 2014			—	—		
18	Ethan Alexander Sharpe	December 27, 2014	Battlecade XV	Gibsonville, NC	1	182	Defeated Jesse Adler to win vacant title.	
19	Jesse Adler	June 27, 2015	Worldwide #8: Absolute Justice	Gibsonville, NC	1	357		
20	Mace Maeda	June 18, 2016	Absolute Justice	Gibsonville, NC	1	56		
21	Dirty Daddy	August 13, 2016	Johnny Weaver Memorial Cup 2016 Finals	Gibsonville, NC	1	139		
22	Cain Justice	December 30, 2016	Battlecade X7	Gibsonville, NC	1	288		
23	Dirty Daddy	October 14, 2017	17th Annual Rumble	Gibsonville, NC	2	77		
24	Mike Mars	December 29, 2018	Battlecade X8	Gibsonville, NC	1	7		
25	Kool J	June 1, 2018	CWF Mid-Atlantic Rising Generation League New Attitude	Gibsonville, NC	1	259		
26	Mace Li	September 22, 2018	Gold Rush	Gibsonville, NC	1	70		
27	Ulysse Demos	December 1, 2018	Battlecade XIX	Gibsonville, NC	1	28	This was an Eight Man Tag Team Match between Michael McAllister, Nick Richards, Teddy Ireland Jr. and Ulysse Demos vs. Arik Royal, Coach Gemini, Mace Li, and Roy Wilkins, where McAllister and Richards' CWF Mid-Atlantic Tag Team Championship belts, Li's Rising Generation League Title and Wilkins' PWI International Heavyweight Title were also on the line. Demos pinned Li to win the title.	
28	Kool Jay	December 29, 2018	The Road To Battlecade	Gibsonville, NC	2	266	This was a Seven Way Shoot Out Match also including Alexander Moss, Bellamy Koga, Kyle Myzery, Teddy Ireland Jr. and The Invisible Numer Man.	
29	TGA Moss	September 21, 2019	Gold Rush	Gibsonville, NC	1	98		
30	Adrian Jackson	December 28, 2019	Battlecade XX	Burlington, NC	1	3		
	Retired	December 31, 2019						

== Combined reigns ==
Rank	Wrestler	No. of reigns	Combined days
1	Kool J	2	525
2	Kamakazi Kid	1	378
2	Ultra Dragon	1	378
4	Nick Richards	1	371
5	Kid Justice	1	364
5	Jason Miller	1	364
7	Kirby Mack	1	357
7	Jesse Adler	1	357
9	Roy Wilkins	1	351
10	Ben Tyler	1	308
11	Cain Justice	1	288
12	Dirty Daddy	2	227
13	Joe Black	1	224
14	Chris Lea	1	210
15	Matt Smith	1	196
16	Charlie Weston	1	189
17	Ethan Alexander Sharpe	1	182
18	Chiva Kid	1	181
19	Chet Sterling	1	140
20	Chase Dakota	1	139
21	Trevor Lee	1	121
22	TGA Moss	1	98
23	Roo D. Lewis	1	76
24	Mace Li	1	70
25	Mace Maeda	1	56
26	Ulysse Demos	1	28
27	Mike Mars	1	7
28	Adrian Jackson	1	3
