= Trevor Lee =

American professional wrestler (born 1993)

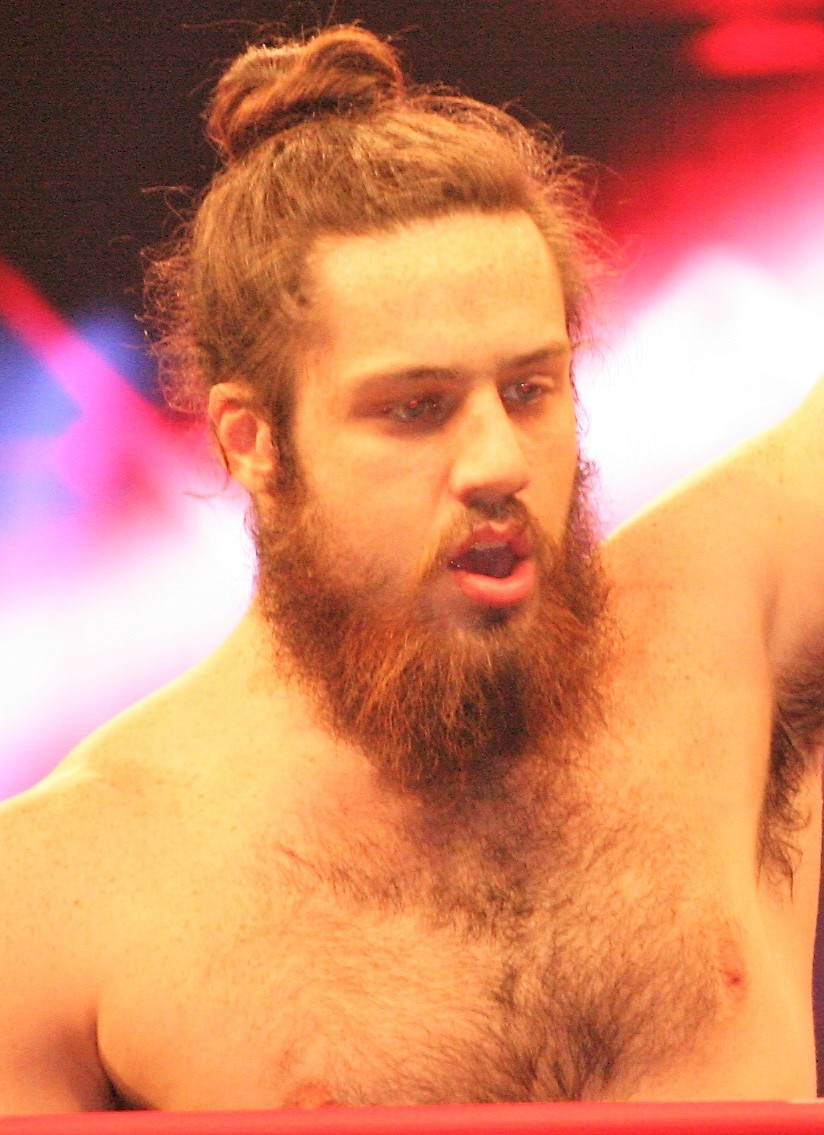
- Lee in 2017

Personal information
- Born: Trevor Lee Caddell; September 30, 1993 (age 33) Cameron, North Carolina, U.S.

Professional wrestling career
- Ring name(s): Cameron Grimes; Trevor Lee
- Billed height: 6 ft 0 in (1.83 m)
- Billed weight: 220 lb (100 kg)
- Billed from: Burlington, North Carolina; Cameron, North Carolina
- Trained by: Jeff Rudd; Jeff Hardy; Matt Hardy
- Debut: 2009

Trevor Lee Caddell (born September 30, 1993) is an American professional wrestler. He is signed to Major League Wrestling (MLW), where he performs under his real name and is a former one-time and inaugural MLW Southern Crown Champion. He also makes appearances on the independent circuit. He is best known for his time in WWE as Cameron Grimes, and in Impact Wrestling.

Caddell made his debut on the independent circuit in 2009 as Trevor Lee, most notably in Pro Wrestling Guerilla (PWG), where he was PWG Tag Team Champion with Andrew Everett. He signed with Impact Wrestling in 2015, where he stayed for the next 4 years. After leaving Impact, he signed with WWE and was assigned to NXT with the name Cameron Grimes. In WWE, he is a former NXT North American Champion and was the final Million Dollar Champion. He then joined the SmackDown brand in 2023 until his release from the company the next year 2024.

== Professional wrestling career ==
=== Independent circuit (2009–2019, 2024–present) ===
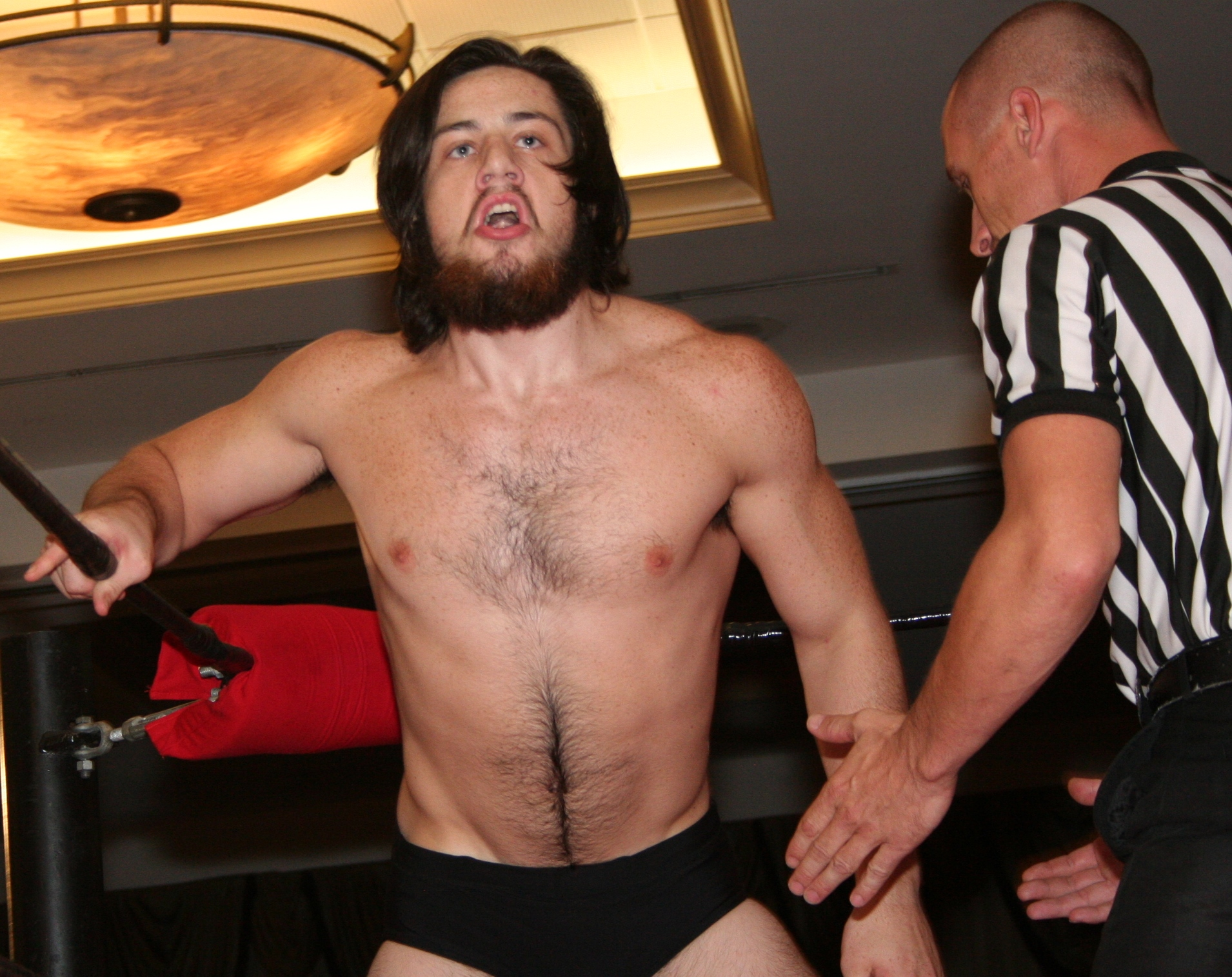
Lee in August 2013

Caddell began his career with CWF-Mid Atlantic in North Carolina in 2009 under the name Trevor Lee, and won his first championship, the CWF Mid-Atlantic Rising Generation League Championship, in March 2010. He competed in various independent promotions over the years, including OMEGA Championship Wrestling. On May 2, 2015, at Chaos In Cameron II, he defeated C. W. Anderson and his mentor Matt Hardy in a triple threat match to win the vacant OMEGA Heavyweight Championship. He dropped the title to Hardy in a triple threat match including Ethan Carter III on November 2, at Loco In Joco 3. On February 27, 2016, Lee won the CWF Mid-Atlantic Heavyweight Championship by defeating Roy Wilkins. At All American Wrestling's AAW Showdown on February 7, 2018, Lee won the AAW Heritage Championship from Zema Ion. He successfully defended the title over the following months against Trey Miguel, Ace Romero and Rich Swann before losing the title in December to DJ Z (the former Ion).

=== Pro Wrestling Guerrilla (2014–2019) ===
Lee made his debut with Pro Wrestling Guerrilla (PWG) on March 28, 2014, at Mystery Vortex II, losing to Andrew Everett in a three-way match also involving Cedric Alexander. At Eleven on July 26, he scored an upset victory on three-time PWG World Champion, Kevin Steen, in his farewell match for the company. Lee participated in the 2014 Battle of Los Angeles tournament, defeating Alexander in the first round and Michael Elgin in the quarter-finals, before losing to Johnny Gargano in the semi-finals. He then defeated former PWG World Champions Adam Cole at Untitled II on October 17, and Chris Hero on December 12, at Black Cole Sun. On February 27, 2015, at From Out of Nowhere, Lee challenged Roderick Strong for the PWG World Championship in a losing effort.

On May 22, Lee and Everett defeated The Beaver Boys (Alex Reynolds and John Silver) in the finals of the 2015 DDT4 tournament to win the PWG World Tag Team Championship. They lost the titles to The Young Bucks at Mystery Vortex III on June 26, after interference from Strong. On July 24, at Pro Wrestling Guerrilla's 12 year anniversary show, Threemendous IV, Lee defeated Tommaso Ciampa. He then entered the 2015 Battle of Los Angeles tournament, defeating Trent? on Night 1. On Night 2, he, Biff Busick and Andrew Everett lost to Mount Rushmore 2.0 (The Young Bucks and Super Dragon) in a six-man Guerrilla Warfare match. He lost in the second round of the tournament to Marty Scurll on Night 3.

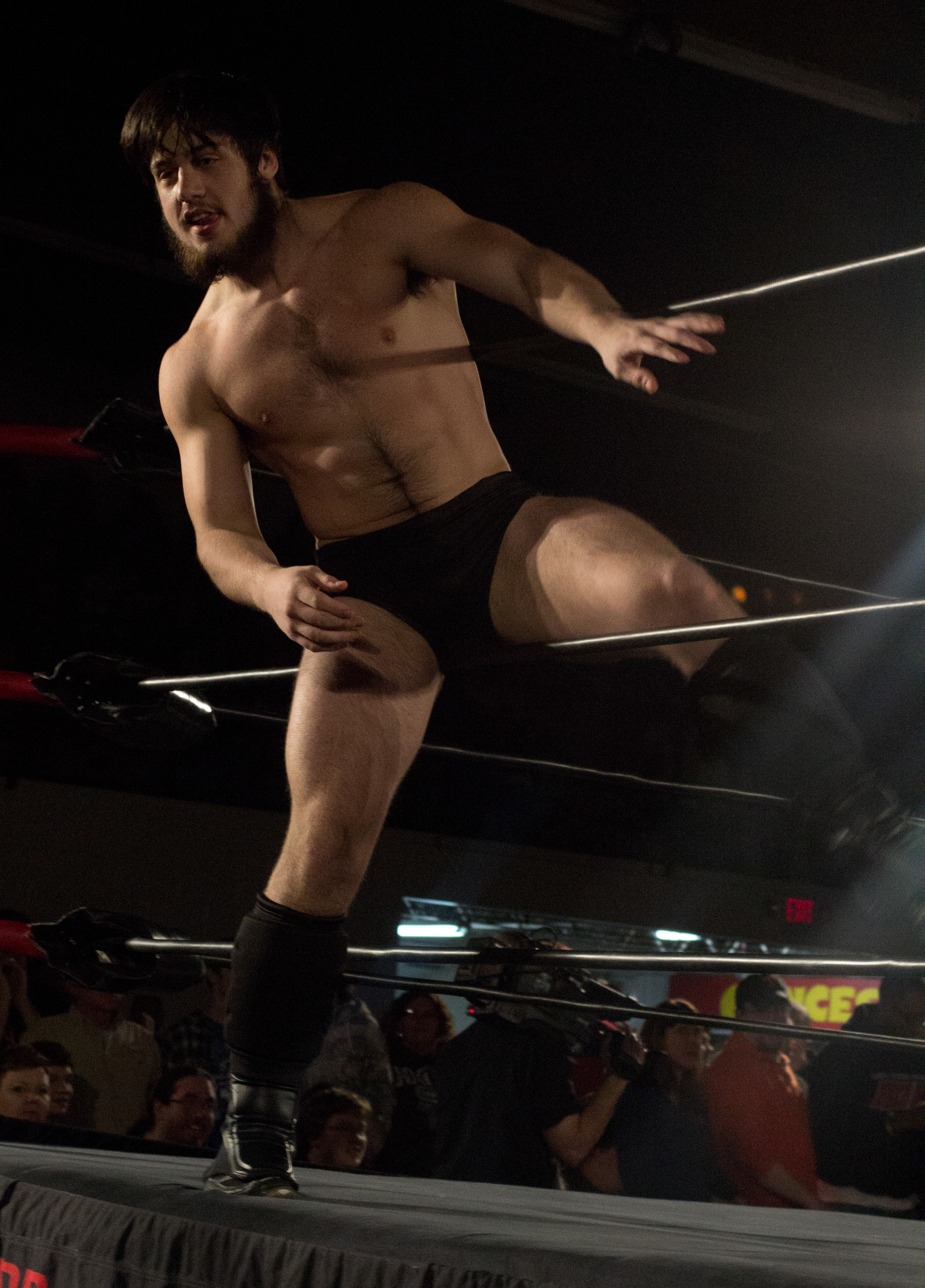
Lee at a Ring of Honor taping in January 2014

At PWG's All Star Weekend 11, Lee began to show villainous traits, cheap shotting opponents before matches and insulting the crowd; he defeated Will Ospreay on Night 1 and Matt Sydal on Night 2. He made it to the finals of the 2016 Battle of Los Angeles tournament, a three-way elimination match along with Scurll, eliminating Ospreay before tapping to Scurll's crossface chicken wing submission. At the 2017 Battle Of Los Angeles tournament, he was eliminated in the first round by Donovan Dijak. The following year, at the 2018 Battle Of Los Angeles tournament, he defeated Marko Stunt in the first round and Brody King in the second round, but lost to Jeff Cobb in the semi-finals. On January 18, 2019, at Hand of Doom, Lee failed to win the PWG World Championship from Cobb in his final match for PWG. After the match, he gave a farewell promo to the crowd.

=== Total Nonstop Action Wrestling / Impact Wrestling ===
==== The Helms Dynasty (2015–2017) ====
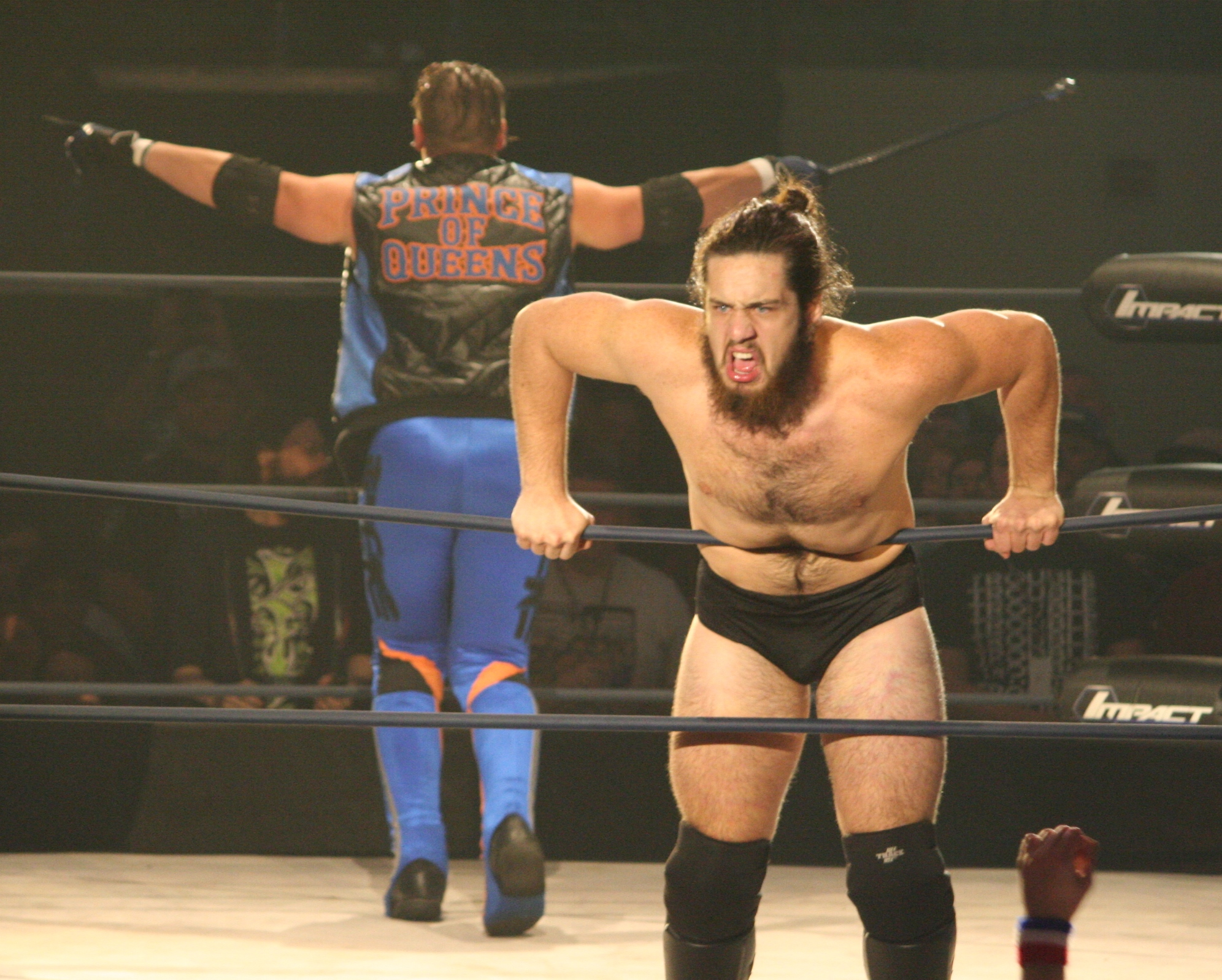
Trevor Lee (right) with Brian Myers in October 2015

Lee made his Total Nonstop Action Wrestling (TNA) debut on the August 12, 2015 episode of Impact Wrestling, teaming with Brian Myers as part of Team GFW, and lost to TNA World Tag Team Champions The Wolves (Davey Richards and Eddie Edwards). On the September 2 episode of Impact Wrestling, Lee and Myers defeated The Wolves in a rematch to win the TNA World Tag Team Championship after interference from Sonjay Dutt. They lost the titles back to The Wolves on the following episode of Impact Wrestling. On October 4, at Bound for Glory, Lee and Myers failed to regain the titles from The Wolves.

After a four-month hiatus, Lee returned on the February 2, 2016 episode of Impact Wrestling, winning the TNA X Division Championship from Tigre Uno with help from his new manager, Gregory Shane Helms. He successfully defended his title against Uno in a Six Sides of Steel match at Lockdown on February 23. On the April 19 episode of Impact Wrestling, he defeated Eddie Edwards and DJZ in a triple threat match to retain the title after Andrew Everett interrupted the match, joining Lee and Helms to form the Helms Dynasty. Lee defeated Edwards in a singles match at One Night Only: Victory Road on May 20. At Slammiversary on June 12, he lost the title to Edwards in a four-way match including Everett and DJZ. At Destination X on July 12, he lost a ladder match for #1 contendership to the X Division Championship. On October 2, at Bound for Glory, he unsuccessfully challenged DJZ for the X Division Championship.

On the February 2, 2017 episode of Impact Wrestling, Lee defeated DJZ in a ladder match to win the title for the second time. The following week, Lee and Helms attacked Everett, kicking him out of The Helms Dynasty. On the April 20 episode of Impact Wrestling, Lee lost the X Division Championship to Low Ki in a six-way match that included Everett, Dutt, Dezmond Xavier and Suicide.

==== The Cult of Lee (2017–2019) ====
On the July 6 episode of Impact, Lee attacked X Division Champion Sonjay Dutt and stole his title, declaring himself the new X Division Champion. He then began "defending" the X Division Championship against handpicked local competitors and wrestled with the title around his waist. On August 17, at Destination X, Dutt regained his title from Lee in a ladder match after interference from the returning Petey Williams. On the September 14 episode of Impact!, Lee formed an alliance with Caleb Konley, who helped him regain the X Division Championship in a Falls Count Anywhere match. Lee and former Helms Dynasty teammate Andrew Everett lost to Dutt, Williams and Matt Sydal on the October 5 episode of Impact!. At Bound for Glory on November 5, he retained the title against Dutt, Williams, Sydal, Garza Jr. and Dezmond Xavier in a six-way match. On the November 9 episode of Impact!, Lee lost the X Division Championship to Taiji Ishimori.

On the February 22, 2018 episode of Impact!, Lee and Konley defeated TNA World Tag Team Champions Santana and Ortiz of Latin American Xchange in a non-title match to earn a title match at Crossroads on March 8, which they lost. At Redemption on April 22, he competed in a six-way match, which was won by Brian Cage. Lee competed in his final match for the company on the December 13 episode of Impact!, losing to Trey Miguel in an Ultimate X qualifying match. His contract with Impact Wrestling expired on December 31. Lee was written off television in an angle where Killer Kross punched a concrete block through his face, which aired on the January 3, 2019 episode of Impact.

=== WWE (2019–2024) ===
==== NXT beginnings (2019–2020) ====
On January 12, 2019, Caddell revealed at a CWF Mid-Atlantic show that he signed a contract with WWE. It was made official on February 11, as he began working at the WWE Performance Center. Shortly after, he started appearing at NXT Live events in the Florida area and made his Full Sail University debut in a dark match before the May 1 NXT television tapings, defeating Shane Strickland. In June, his ring name was changed to Cameron Grimes.

Later that month, Grimes was announced to be a participant in the NXT Breakout Tournament, where the winner received an opportunity to challenge for any title in NXT. Grimes made his debut on the July 3 episode of NXT, defeating Isaiah "Swerve" Scott in the first round of the tournament. On the July 31 episode of NXT, Grimes defeated Bronson Reed to advance to the finals, losing to A.C.H. on August 14. On September 18, Grimes defeated Sean Maluta on NXT's debut on the USA Network. Over the next few weeks, Grimes developed a winning streak, defeating Raul Mendoza and Boa before losing to Matt Riddle on the October 23 episode of NXT. After a brief feud with Kushida, Grimes faced Keith Lee for the NXT North American Championship on the March 11, 2020 episode of NXT, but failed to win the title.

On the May 6 episode of NXT, Grimes called out Finn Bálor, and after his match against Denzel Dejournette, he was attacked by Bálor, leading to a match between the two the following week, which Grimes won after interference from Damian Priest. Grimes flaunted his victory over Bálor while mocking Priest for losing to Bálor at TakeOver: In Your House and calling him a loser, causing Priest to attack him backstage. On the June 17 episode of NXT, Priest found the tires of his Dodge Challenger punctured, which was done by Grimes, who once again mocked Priest and was challenged to a match the next week. Before the match, Priest was attacked and came into the match injured, which allowed Grimes to win. He lost to Priest in a rematch on the July 15 episode of NXT. On the August 12 episode of NXT, Grimes defeated Velveteen Dream and Kushida to qualify for the NXT North American Championship ladder match at NXT TakeOver XXX. At the event on August 22, Grimes was unsuccessful in capturing the title. On the September 23 episode of NXT, Grimes competed in the inaugural Gauntlet Eliminator match to determine the #1 contender for the NXT Championship at TakeOver 31 against Finn Bálor, where he lost to Kyle O'Reilly.

The following week on NXT, he entered a feud with Dexter Lumis, who he felt disrespected him backstage. Grimes attacked Lumis after his match with Austin Theory on the October 7 episode of NXT and cost him his NXT North American Championship match against Priest the following week. Grimes was put in a Haunted House of Terror match against Lumis at Halloween Havoc on October 28, which he lost by submission. On the November 11 episode of NXT, Grimes interfered in Lumis's match against Timothy Thatcher, subsequently wrapping his head in a burlap sack and attacking him. A blindfold match between the two on the following episode of NXT ended in an apparent no contest after Grimes unknowingly knocked the referee unconscious and ran off. On December 6, Grimes lost again to Lumis in a strap match at TakeOver: WarGames, ending their feud. Three days later on NXT, after losing to Tommaso Ciampa, Grimes was attacked by Thatcher because he had angrily questioned Thatcher about being at ringside. It was announced the following week that Grimes was out injured for four to six weeks after Thatcher's attack, which had been done to write him off television as Grimes legitimately needed arthroscopic knee surgery.

==== The Richest Man In NXT (2021–2022) ====
Grimes returned on the February 10, 2021 episode of NXT with a new gimmick, claiming to have become a GameStop investor during his time away (in reference to the GameStop stock rise), thus making him the "richest man in NXT." On April 7, he failed to win a gauntlet match at TakeOver: Stand & Deliver for a future North American Championship match. On the April 27 episode of NXT, Grimes began a feud with WWE Hall of Famer Ted DiBiase after encountering him in a jewelry store over their watches. Over the following weeks, DiBiase would one-up Grimes, outbidding him in various purchases and costing him a match to Jake Atlas. On the May 25 episode of NXT, Grimes was attacked by LA Knight, who aligned himself with DiBiase, turning face in the process.

On the June 8 episode of NXT, DiBiase reintroduced the Million Dollar Championship and announced that the winner of a ladder match between Grimes and Knight at TakeOver: In Your House would win the title. At the event on June 13, Grimes failed to win the title. On the following episode of NXT, Grimes saved DiBiase from an attack by Knight, further signaling his face turn. On the June 29 episode of NXT, Grimes challenged Knight for the title at The Great American Bash, which he accepted on the condition that if Grimes lost, he would become Knight's personal butler. At the event on July 6, Grimes failed to win the title and was forced to become Knight's butler. On the August 10 episode of NXT, a rematch for the title between Knight and Grimes was made official for NXT TakeOver 36, on the condition that DiBiase would replace Grimes as Knight's butler if Knight won. At the event on August 22, Grimes defeated Knight after interference from DiBiase to win the Million Dollar Championship. Two days later on NXT, Grimes gave the title back to DiBiase, who said that Grimes should keep it, however, DiBiase actually kept the title and instead gave Grimes a replica. In September, the title was deactivated and Grimes was recognized as the final Million Dollar Champion.

In October, Grimes began a feud with Duke Hudson. On the November 16 episode of NXT, Grimes defeated Hudson in a poker showdown, after which Hudson powerbombed him through the poker table and trimmed his beard and ponytail. The following week, a short-haired Grimes challenged Hudson to a hair vs. hair match at NXT WarGames, which he accepted. At the event on December 5, Grimes defeated Hudson. He defeated Hudson again in a no holds barred match on the December 14 episode of NXT, ending their feud.

==== NXT North American Champion (2022–2023) ====
On the January 25, 2022 episode of NXT, Grimes defeated Tony D'Angelo to become the number one contender to the NXT North American Championship. At NXT: Vengeance Day on February 15, he failed to win the title from Carmelo Hayes. On April 2, at NXT Stand & Deliver, Grimes defeated Hayes, Santos Escobar, Solo Sikoa and Grayson Waller in a fatal five-way ladder match to win the North American Championship. He made his first successful title defense against Sikoa on the April 12 episode of NXT. On May 3, Grimes would make another successful title defense in a triple threat match at NXT Spring Breakin' against Hayes and Sikoa. At NXT In Your House on June 4, Grimes lost the NXT North American Championship to Hayes, ending his reign at 63 days.

Grimes then entered a rivalry with NXT Champion Bron Breakker. At NXT: The Great American Bash on July 5, Grimes failed to win the NXT Championship from Breakker. Later that month, he began feuding with Joe Gacy and The Dyad (Jagger Reid and Rip Fowler), known as Schism, with Gacy claiming that he could be his father figure as Grimes lost his real life father years prior. During this rivalry, Gacy made his main roster debut on the October 17 episode of Raw, asking The O.C. (Karl Anderson and Luke Gallows) to be his partners for a six-man tag team match against Schism, which they accepted. The next night on NXT, Grimes and The O.C. defeated Schism. On November 8, Grimes lost to Gacy in his final match for NXT after interference from Schism's newest member, Ava Raine.

==== SmackDown (2023–2024) ====
As part of the 2023 WWE Draft, Grimes was drafted to the SmackDown brand. He made his main roster in-ring debut on the May 12 episode of SmackDown, defeating Baron Corbin in 6 seconds. On the July 21 episode of SmackDown, Grimes competed in a United States Title Invitational fatal four-way match, which was won by Rey Mysterio. He returned to NXT on November 28, competing in a fatal four-way match for #1 contendership to the NXT North American Championship at NXT Deadline, but lost. On the April 12, 2024 episode of SmackDown, Grimes lost to Bron Breakker in his final match for WWE, as he was released from his contract on April 23.

=== Major League Wrestling (2024–present) ===
On September 9, 2024, Major League Wrestling announced that Lee would make his debut for the promotion at Slaughterhouse on October 4. However, on September 27, MLW cancelled the event due to the effects of Hurricane Helene.

On April 6, 2026, Lee officially signed with MLW.

== Personal life ==
Caddell's father, Tracy Caddell, was a professional wrestler and promoter who died on July 29, 2018.

== Championships and accomplishments ==
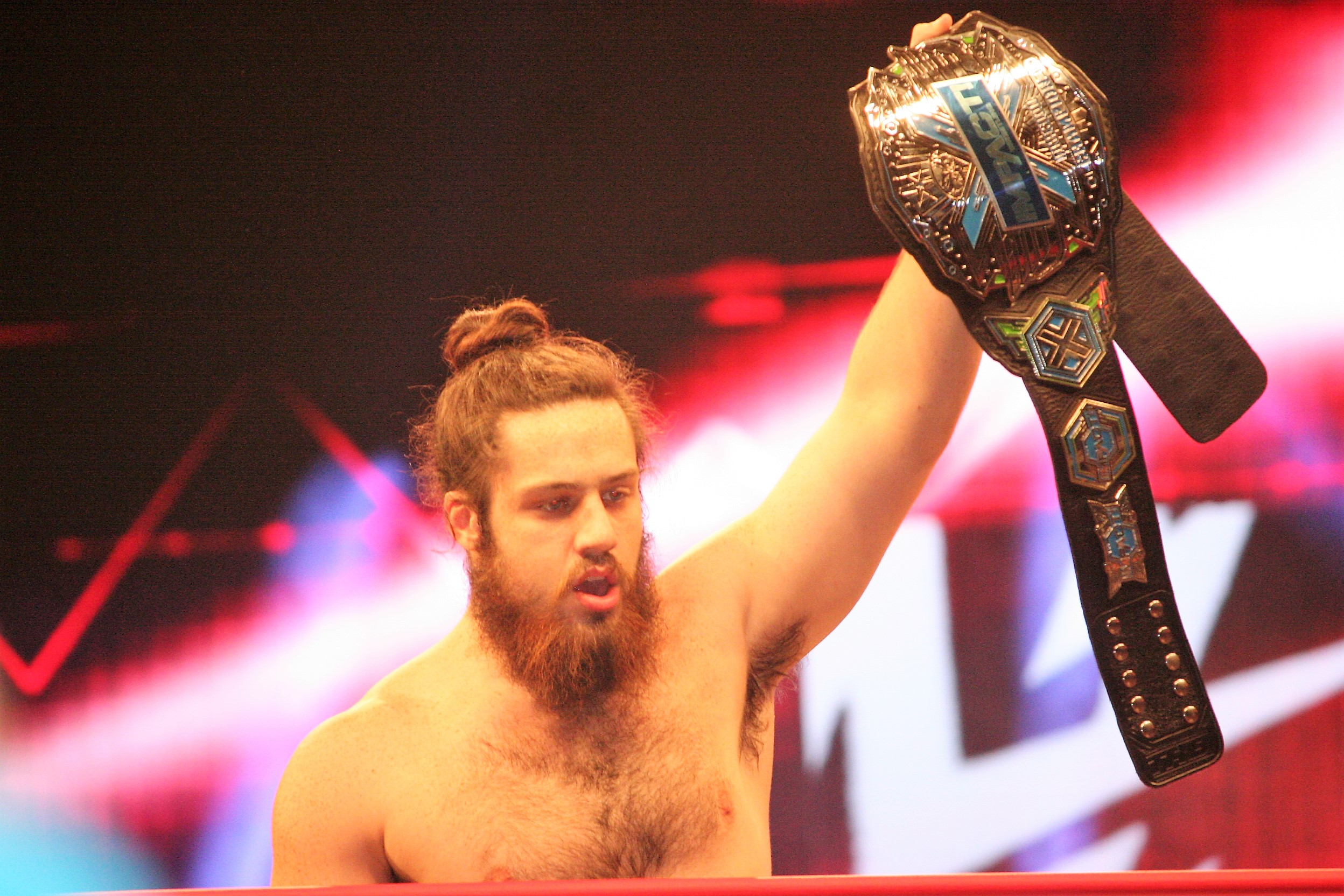
Lee is a former three-time Impact X Division Champion.

- All American Wrestling
  - AAW Heavyweight Championship (1 time)
  - AAW Heritage Championship (1 time)
  - AAW Tag Team Championship (1 time) – with Andrew Everett
  - Eighth Triple Crown Champion
- Carolina Wrestling Federation Mid-Atlantic
  - CWF Mid-Atlantic Heavyweight Championship (1 time)
  - CWF Mid-Atlantic Rising Generation League Championship (1 time)
  - PWI Ultra J Championship (1 time)
  - CWF Mid-Atlantic Tag Team Championship (1 time) – with Chet Sterling
  - CWF Mid-Atlantic Television Championship (2 times)
  - Kernodle Brothers Tag Team Tournament (2018) – with Chet Sterling
  - CWF Annual Rumble (2017)
  - Johnny Weaver Memorial Tournament (2013)
- Integrity Sports Entertainment Australia
  - Integrity Heavyweight Championship (1 time)
- Major League Wrestling
  - MLW Southern Crown Championship (1 time, inaugural)
- OMEGA Championship Wrestling
  - OMEGA Heavyweight Championship (1 time)
- Pro Wrestling Guerrilla
  - PWG World Tag Team Championship (1 time) – with Andrew Everett
  - DDT4 (2015) – with Andrew Everett
- Pro Wrestling Illustrated
  - Ranked No. 61 of the top 500 singles wrestlers in the PWI 500 in 2016
- Total Nonstop Action Wrestling / Impact Wrestling / Global Force Wrestling
  - TNA / Impact/ GFW X Division Championship (3 times)
  - TNA World Tag Team Championship (1 time) – with Brian Myers
  - Race for the Case (2017 – Blue Case)
- WWE
  - NXT North American Championship (1 time)
  - Million Dollar Championship (1 time, final)

== Luchas de Apuestas record ==
Winner (wager)	Loser (wager)	Location	Event	Date	Notes
Cameron Grimes (Hair)	Duke Hudson (Hair)	Orlando, Florida	NXT WarGames (2021)	December 5, 2021	
