= Andrew Everett =

American professional wrestler

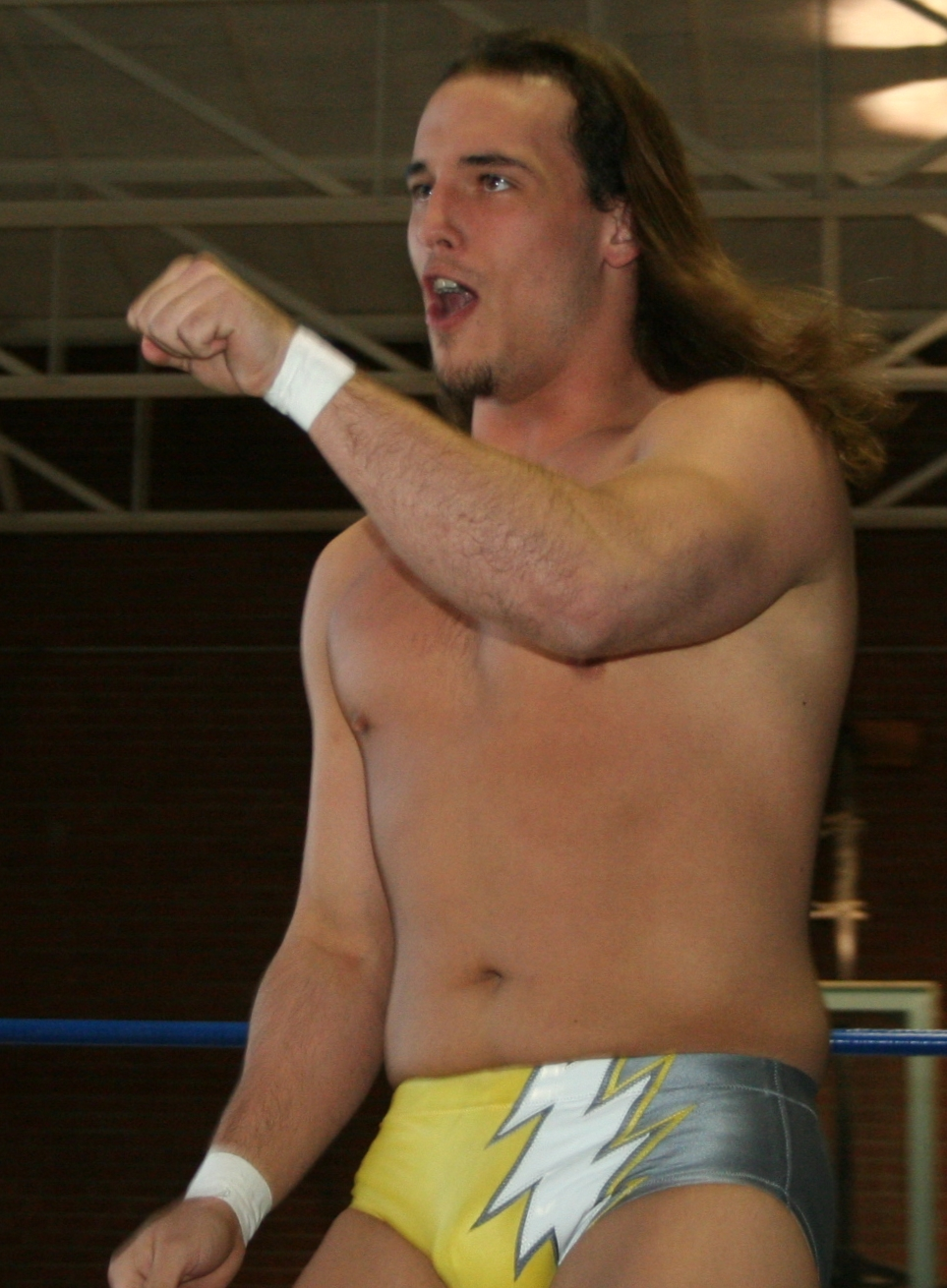
- Everett in February 2014

Personal information
- Born: Drew Everett Wenkel; July 9, 1992 (age 34) Burlington, North Carolina, U.S.

Professional wrestling career
- Ring name(s): Andrew Everett; Andrew the Giant; Chiva IV; Chiva Kid; Cross; Skyhunk
- Billed height: 5 ft 9 in (1.75 m)
- Billed weight: 214 lb (97 kg)
- Billed from: Burlington, North Carolina
- Trained by: Jeff Rudd; Jeff Hardy; Matt Hardy
- Debut: September 22, 2007

Drew Everett Wenkel (born July 9, 1992), better known by the ring name Andrew Everett, is an American professional wrestler. He is best known for his time in Impact Wrestling, where he became a one-time Impact World Tag Team Champion alongside DJZ. He has also made appearances for All Elite Wrestling (AEW), Major League Wrestling (MLW) and independent circuit.

== Professional wrestling career ==
=== Early career (2007−2015) ===
Everett began his career under the masked persona of Chiva Kid; he unmasked in 2013. Everett has wrestled mostly on the independent circuit, appearing for promotions like OMEGA, Pro Wrestling Guerrilla (PWG), Combat Zone Wrestling (CZW), Global Force Wrestling (GFW) and Alternative Wrestling World (AWW). Internationally, Everett has wrestled for British promotion Revolution Pro Wrestling.

=== Impact Wrestling / Total Nonstop Action Wrestling (2015–2018, 2022, 2023, 2024) ===
On October 4, 2015, at Bound for Glory, Everett made his Total Nonstop Action Wrestling (TNA) debut in an Ultimate X match for the TNA X Division Championship but fell short as the match was won by Tigre Uno.

In April 2016, he made his return as a heel, interrupting a match between Trevor Lee, Eddie Edwards and DJZ, helping Lee, forming the stable known as The Helms Dynasty with Trevor Lee and Gregory Shane Helms. At One Night Only: Victory Road 2016, Everett defeated DJZ with help from Lee and Helms. He would then compete in a four-way match at Slammiversary for the TNA X Division Championship, in a losing effort. On the June 28 episode of Impact Wrestling, he participated in a battle royal to be the number one contender for the X Division Championship, but was eliminated by the winner Braxton Sutter. On the July 5 episode of Impact Wrestling, he participated in an Ultimate X match for the X Division Championship, in a losing effort. At Destination X, he lost a ladder match to be the number one contender to the X Division Championship. On the October 6 episode of Impact Wrestling, Everett and Lee teamed with Marshe Rockett in a Team X Gold match against DJZ, Braxton Sutter and Mandrews in a losing effort.

On February 9, 2017, Everett was attacked by Trevor Lee and Gregory Shane Helms, kicking him out of the Helms Dynasty, turning him face in the process. On February 23, 2017, Everett ran down and saved DJZ from Lee and Helms. On the April 20 episode of Impact Wrestling, Lee lost the Impact Wrestling X Division Championship to Low Ki in a Six-Way match including Everett, Sonjay Dutt, Dezmond Xavier and Suicide.

On the July 6 episode of Impact Wrestling episode of Impact, Everett entered the 2017 GFW Super X Cup Tournament. On July 13, he was eliminated in the first round by A. C. H.

On the October 5 episode of Impact!, Everett joined the alliance of Trevor Lee and Caleb Konley, losing to the team of Sonjay Dutt, Petey Williams and Matt Sydal in a six-man tag team match, turning heel again in the process.

On April 24, 2018, DJ Z and Everett defeated Eli Drake and Scott Steiner to win the Impact World Tag Team Championship, turning Everett face again. On April 26, 2018, Everett and DJZ lost the titles to The Latin American Xchange (Santana and Ortiz).

On September 18, Everett announced that he was granted his release from Impact Wrestling.

On June 19, 2022, Everett returned to Impact Wrestling, replacing an injured Jack Evans in the six-man Ultimate X match at Slammiversary for the Impact X Division Championship.

=== All Elite Wrestling (2022–2024) ===
Everett has made three appearances for All Elite Wrestling, losing to Shawn Spears on an episode of Dark in 2022, Samoa Joe on an episode of Collision in August 2023, and Claudio Castagnoli on an episode of Collision in January 2024.

== Championships and accomplishments ==
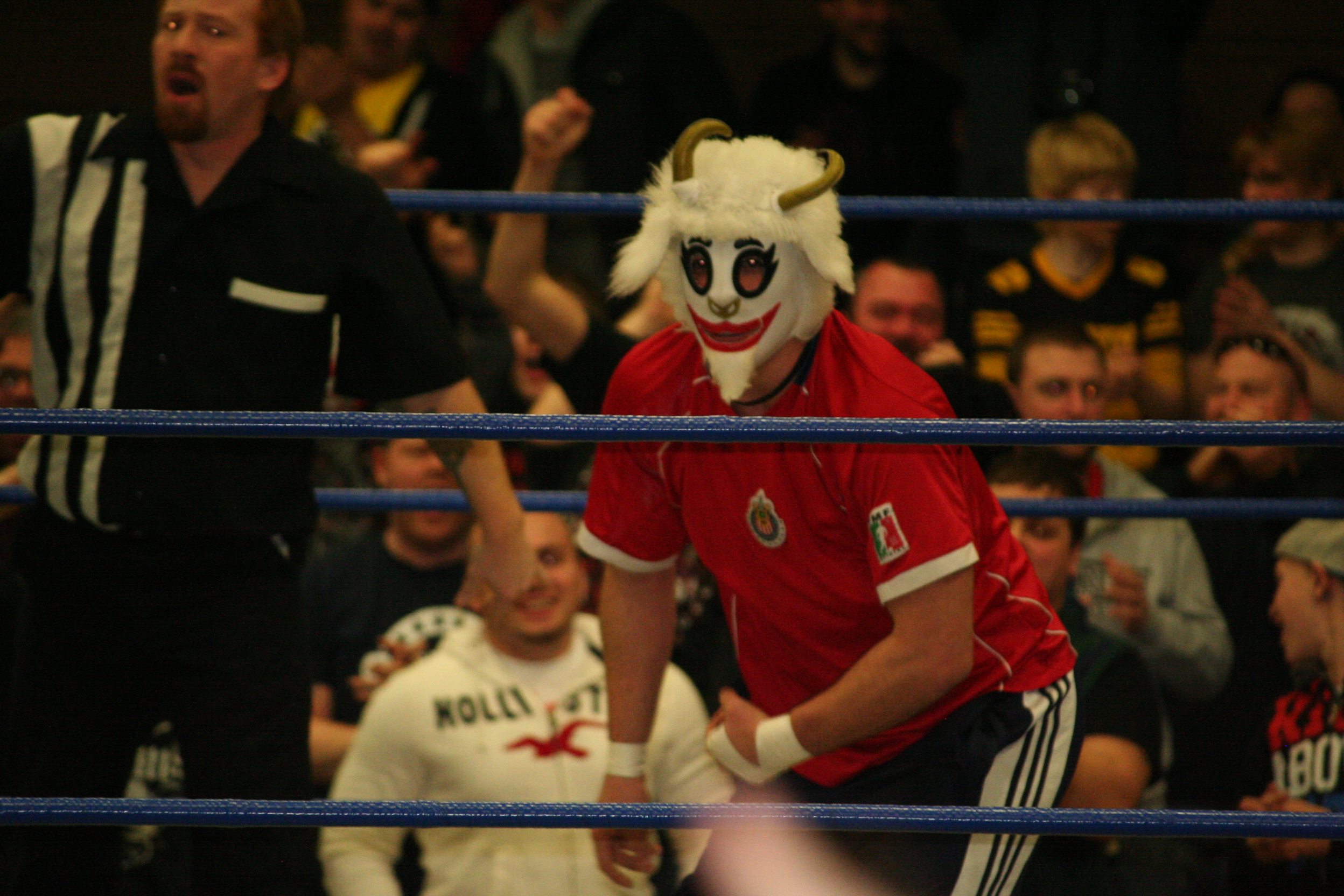
Everett as Chiva Kid in 2013.

- All American Wrestling
  - AAW Tag Team Championship (1 time) – with Trevor Lee
- CWF Mid-Atlantic
  - CWF Mid-Atlantic Rising Generation League Championship (1 time)
  - CWF Mid-Atlantic Tag Team Championship (1 time) – with Arik Royal
  - 16th Annual Rumble (2016)
- Deadlock Pro-Wrestling
  - DPW National Championship (1 time)
  - DPW Awards (1 time)
    - Match of the Year (2022) vs. Konosuke Takeshita at Believe The Hype
- Impact Wrestling
  - Impact World Tag Team Championship (1 time) – with DJZ
- Lucha Libre AAA Worldwide
  - Best Match of the Night (2017) – with DJZ vs. Drago and Aerostar
- Premier Wrestling Federation
  - PWF Unified Tag Team Championship (1 time) – with Colby Corino
- Pro Wrestling Guerrilla
  - PWG World Tag Team Championship (1 time) – with Trevor Lee
  - DDT4 (2015) – with Trevor Lee
- Pro Wrestling Illustrated
  - Ranked No. 78 of the top 500 singles wrestlers in the PWI 500 in 2017
- Revolution Pro Wrestling
  - RPW British Cruiserweight Championship (1 time)
- Pro Wrestling International
  - PWI Ultra J Championship (4 times, final)
- Southside Wrestling Entertainment
  - SWE Speed King Championship (1 time)
