= CWF Mid-Atlantic Heavyweight Championship =

Professional wrestling championship

Details
- Promotion: AWA Superstars Of Wrestling; CWF Mid-Atlantic
- Date established: 2000
- Date retired: December 31, 2019

Other names
- CWF Mid-Atlantic Heavyweight Championship (2007 – present); AWA/CWF Mid-Atlantic Heavyweight Championship (2004 – 2007); CWF Mid-Atlantic Heavyweight Championship (2001 – 2004)
Statistics
- First champion: David Taylor
- Final champion: Roy Wilkins
- Most reigns: Ric Converse (6)
- Longest reign: Trevor Lee (1085 days)
- Shortest reign: Roy Wilkins (3 days)

The CWF Mid-Atlantic Heavyweight Championship was a professional wrestling heavyweight championship in Carolina Wrestling Federation Mid-Atlantic (CWF Mid-Atlantic).

== Title history ==
Overall, there have been 38 reigns shared between 23 wrestlers, with two vacancy. The inaugural champion was David Taylor, who was awarded the title in 2000 to become the first CWF Heavyweight Champion. Ric Converse holds the record for most reigns, with six. At 1085 days, Trevor Lee's first reign is the longest in the title's history. Adrian Jackson's only reign was the shortest in the history of the title, lasting only seven days.

=== Reigns ===
Key
No.	Overall reign number
Reign	Reign number for the specific champion
N/A	The information is not available or is unknown

No.	Champion	Championship change			Reign statistics		Notes	Ref.
No.	Champion	Date	Event	Location	Reign	Days	Notes	Ref.
1	David Taylor	2000	N/A	N/A	1	N/A	Taylor was awarded the title and became the inaugural champion.	
2	Jeff Justice	February 22, 2001	N/A	Myrtle Beach, South Carolina	1	9		
3	Madd Maxx	March 3, 2001	Fallout	Graham, North Carolina	1	301		
4	Eddie Brown	December 29, 2001	BattleCade	Graham, North Carolina	1	182		
5	Otto Schwanz	June 29, 2002	Hostile Intentions	Graham, North Carolina	1	126		
6	Corey Edsel	November 2, 2002	The Next Level (2002)	Burlington, North Carolina	1	420		
7	Ric Converse	December 27, 2003	Live event	Burlington, North Carolina	1	280		
8	Corey Edsel	October 2, 2004	Live event	Burlington, North Carolina	2	77	This was a no-countout, no-disqualification, no time limit match	
9	Ric Converse	December 18, 2004	Battlecade V: 5th Anniversary Show	Burlington, NC	2	209		
10	Garry Stevens	July 15, 2005	Friday Night Fight II	Burlington, NC	1	155	This was a "King of the Road" match	
11	Ric Converse	December 17, 2005	Live event	Burlington, North Carolina	3	179	This was a steel cage match	
—	Vacated	June 14, 2006	N/A	N/A	—	—	The championship is vacated when Ric Converse wins the AWA World Heavyweight Championship	
12	Rob McBride	July 8, 2006	Live event	Burlington, North Carolina	1	98	Defeated Joey Silvia in a tournament final for the vacated title	
13	Joey Silvia	October 14, 2006	Live event	Burlington, North Carolina	1	371		
14	Garry Stevens	October 20, 2007	Live event	Burlington, North Carolina	2	56		
15	Ric Converse	December 15, 2007	Live event	Burlington, North Carolina	4	189		
16	Rob McBride	June 21, 2008	CWF Championship Wrestling	Burlington, North Carolina	2	91		
17	Ric Converse	September 20, 2008	CWF Championship Wrestling	Burlington, North Carolina	5	91		
18	Brass Munkey	December 20, 2008	Battlecade IX (2008)	Burlington, North Carolina	1	378		
19	Kamakazi Kid	January 2, 2010	Battlecade X (2010)	Burlington, North Carolina	1	133	This was a three-way dance involving Ric Converse	
20	Steve Greene	May 15, 2010	1000 Ways to Die! (2010)	Burlington, North Carolina	1	112		
21	Lee Valiant	September 4, 2010	People's Choice (2010)	Burlington, North Carolina	1	14		
22	Ric Converse	September 18, 2010	Sound of Thunder (2010)	Burlington, North Carolina	6	91		
23	Lee Valiant	December 18, 2010	Battlecade XI (2010)	Burlington, North Carolina	2	182		
24	Xsiris	June 18, 2011	Absolute Justice 5 (2011)	Burlington, North Carolina	1	203	This was a no-disqualification match	
25	Adam Page	January 7, 2012	New Years Knockout! (2012)	Burlington, North Carolina	1	119		
26	Kamakazi Kid	May 5, 2012	The Homecoming (2012)	Burlington, North Carolina	2	70	Kazi survived a 14-man elimination match to win the title	
27	Ray Kandrack	July 14, 2012	Opportunity Knocks (2012)	Gibsonville, North Carolina	1	168		
28	Arik Royal	December 29, 2012	Battlecade 13 (2012)	Gibsonville, North Carolina	1	560		
29	Roy Wilkins	July 12, 2014	Opportunity Knocks (2014)	Gibsonville, North Carolina	1	168		
30	Brad Attitude	December 27, 2014	BattleCade (2014)	Gibsonville, North Carolina	1	238	This was a no disqualification match	
31	Marcellus King	August 22, 2015	CWF Worldwide #16	Gibsonville, North Carolina	1	91	King cashed in his Golden Ticket	
32	Brad Attitude	November 21, 2015	OMEGA Loco in Joco 3	Smithfield, North Carolina	2	35	This was a Four-way match that also involved Chet Sterling and Roy Wilkins	
33	Roy Wilkins	December 26, 2015	Battlecade XVI (2105)	Gibsonville, North Carolina	2	63	This was a Six-way match that also involved Trevor Lee, John Skyler, Chet Sterling, and Lance Lude	
34	Trevor Lee	February 27, 2016	End of an Era 2016	Gibsonville, North Carolina	1	1,085	This was a No Time Limit No Disqualification No Count Out Match	
—	Vacated	February 16, 2019	End of an Era 2019	Gibsonville, North Carolina	—	—	Vacated after Lee signed with WWE	
35	Arik Royal	August 24, 2019	Johnny Weaver Memorial Tournament 2019 Finals	Gibsonville, North Carolina	2	28	Defeated Roy Wilkins in a tournament final for the vacated title	
36	Adrian Jackson	September 21, 2019	Gold Rush (2019)	Gibsonville, North Carolina	1	7		
37	Arik Royal	September 28, 2019	Rising Generation League - El Dorado	Gibsonville, North Carolina	3	91		
38	Roy Wilkins	December 28, 2019	Battlecade XX	Burlington, North Carolina	3	3		
	Retired	December 31, 2019						

== Combined reigns ==
Rank	Wrestler	No. of reigns	Combined days
1	Trevor Lee	1	1085
2	Ric Converse	6	1039
3	Arik Royal	3	679
4	Corey Edsel	2	497
5	Brass Munkey	1	378
6	Joey Silva	1	371
7	Madd Maxx	1	301
8	Brad Attitude	2	273
9	Roy Wilkins	3	234
10	Garry Stevens	2	211
11	Eddie Brown	1	203
11	Kamakazi Kid	1	203
11	Xsiris	1	203
14	Lee Valiant	2	196
15	Rob McBride	2	189
16	Ray Kandrack	1	168
17	Otto Schwanz	1	126
18	Adam Page	1	119
19	Steve Greene	1	112
20	Marcellus King	1	91
21	Jeff Justice	1	9
22	Adrian Jackson	1	7
23	David Taylor	1	-
