= CWF Mid-Atlantic Tag Team Championship =

Professional wrestling tag team championship

Details
- Promotion: CWF Mid-Atlantic
- Date established: 2001
- Date retired: December 31, 2019

Other names
- CWF Tag Team Championship (2000–2001); FWA-Carolinas Tag Team Championship (2001–2004); AWA/CWF Mid-Atlantic Tag Team Championship (2004–2007); CWF Mid-Atlantic Tag Team Championship (2007–2019)
Statistics
- First champions: The Dupps (Bo and Stan Dupp)
- Final champions: Aaron Biggs and Mike Mars
- Most reigns: The SouthSide Playas (3)
- Longest reign: Dave Dawson and Zane Dawson (392 days)
- Shortest reign: Teddy Ireland Jr. & Ulysse Demos and Cain Justice & Ethan Alexander Sharpe (28 days)

The CWF Mid-Atlantic Tag Team Championship was a professional wrestling tag team championship in Carolina Wrestling Federation Mid-Atlantic (CWF Mid-Atlantic). It was the original tag team title of the Carolina Wrestling Federation promotion, later used in the Frontier Wrestling Alliance (2001–2004) and AWA Superstars (2005–2007) as a regional title, officially representing the Mid-Atlantic United States, while it was a member of the respective governing bodies. It was introduced as the CWF Tag Team Championship in early 2000.

The inaugural champions were The Dupps (Bo and Stan Dupp), after being awarded the title in 2000 to become the first CWF Tag Team Champions. The SouthSide Playas (J-Money and LA Cash) hold the record for most reigns, with three. At 385 days, Rob "Boogie Woogie Man" McBride and Tank Lawson's first and only reign is the longest in the title's history. While champions, they also defended the AWA World Tag Team Championship. Semper Ferocious' (Bobby Wohlfert and Devin Dalton) only reign was the shortest in the history of the title lasting only 35 days. Overall, there have been 51 reigns shared between 42 teams, with three vacancies.

== Title history ==
Key
No.	Overall reign number
Reign	Reign number for the specific champion
N/A	The information is not available or is unknown

No.	Champion	Championship change			Reign statistics		Notes	Ref.
No.	Champion	Date	Event	Location	Reign	Days	Notes	Ref.
1	The Dupps (Bo Dupp and Stan Dupp)	2000	Live event	N/A	1	N/A	Bo and Stan Dupp were awarded the titles.	
—	Vacated	2001	N/A	N/A	—	—	The championship is vacated when The Dupps leave the promotion.	
2	Los Latinos Locos (Kozmo and Super Kozmo)	May 19, 2001	Live event	Burlington, NC	1	182	In 2001, the title was renamed the FWA-Carolinas Mid-Atlantic Tag Team Championship when the Carolina Wrestling Federation became a U.S. affiliate promotion for the Frontier Wrestling Alliance.	
3	The SouthSide Playas (J-Money and LA Cash)	November 17, 2001	Live event	Graham, NC	1	126		
4	Joe Storm and Damien Storm	March 23, 2002	Live event	Graham, NC	1	49		
5	The SouthSide Playas (J-Money and LA Cash)	May 11, 2002	Live event	Burlington, NC	2	49		
6	Main Attraction (Chris Steele and Scott Powers)	June 29, 2002	Live event	Graham, NC	2	N/A		
—	Vacated	2002	N/A	N/A	—	—	The championship is vacated when Main Event are stripped as champions after failing to appear for a scheduled title defense.	
7	Gemini Kid and Mikael Yamaha	December 28, 2002	Live event	Graham, NC	1	235		
8	The Brads (Brad Attitude and Brad Rainz)	August 20, 2003	Live event	Wentworth, NC	1	129		
9	Gemini Kid and Mikael Yamaha	December 27, 2003	Live event	Burlington, NC	2	35	This was a title vs hair match.	
10	The SuperBrads (Brad Attitude and Brad Rainz)	January 31, 2004	Live event	Seagrove, NC	2	56	This was a tournament final to unify the ACW and CWF Tag Team Championships.	
11	The Crew (American Steel Ninja and Brass Munkey)	March 27, 2004	Live event	Ramseur, NC	1	315		
12	Twisted Aggression (Ivan Koloff and Sean Powers)	February 5, 2005	Live event	Seagrove, NC	1	73	In 2005, the title was renamed the AWA Mid-Atlantic Tag Team Championship when the promotion became an affiliate for AWA Superstars.	
13	The Southside Playaz (J-Money and Will B. Smooth)	April 19, 2005	Live event	Pfafftown, NC	1	291		
14	Garry Stevens and Mitch Connor	February 4, 2006	Live event	Burlington, NC	1	196		
15	Rob McBride and Tank Lawson	August 19, 2006	Live event	Burlington, NC	1	385	On December 2, 2006, McBride and Lawson also won the AWA World Tag Team Championship from the Extreme Horsemen (Steve Corino and Ricky Landel) at the AWA Convention Showcase. On July 29, 2007, the title was renamed the CWF Mid-Atlantic Tag Team Championship when the promotion's membership in AWA Superstars is terminated.	
16	The VIPs (Gemini Kid and Jesse Ortega)	September 8, 2007	Sumner Civitans Ballfield	Burlington, NC	1	189		
17	Kamakazi Kid and Xsiris	March 15, 2008	CWF Championship Wrestling	Burlington, NC	1	126	This was a Lucha rules match. Xsiris and Kamakazi Kid won the title wrestling as the masked wrestlers Las Chivas and revealed their identities after the match.	
—	Vacated	July 19, 2008	Valediction	Burlington, NC	—	—	The championship is vacated when Xsiris and Kamakazi Kid are stripped as champions when Mikael Yamaha wrestled in place of an injured Kamakazi Kid for a scheduled title defense.	
18	Mikael Yamaha and Xsiris	August 2, 2008	Hot August Night	Burlington, NC	1	203	Xsiris and Mikael Yamaha defeated The VIPs (Jesse Ortega and Gemini Kid) in a tournament final to win the vacant titles.	
19	The Syndicate (Evan Banks and Michael McAllister)	February 21, 2009	Fallout	Burlington, NC	1	105	Banks and McAllister defeated Yamaha in a handicap match.	
20	The VIPs (Gemini Kid and Jesse Ortega)	June 6, 2009	Wrestling at the Pavilion	Oxford, NC	2	88	This was a three-way match also involving Arik Royale and Chase Dakota.	
21	Fatback Enterprise (Corey Edsel and Donnie Dollars)	September 5, 2009	Fatback Rising II	Burlington, NC	1	182		
22	The Aftermath (Jaxon Dane and Marcellus King)	March 6, 2010	Beginning's End	Burlington, NC	1	105	This was a three-way match involving Alex Adonis and Butch McLean.	
23	Fatback Enterprises (Donnie Dollars and Nick Richards)	June 19, 2010	Absolute Justice IV	Burlington, NC	1	133	This was a four-way match involving Aftermath, Destiny Inc., and Matt Smith and Chase Dakota.	
24	Ray Kandrack and Ty Dillinger	October 30, 2010	MASKacre!	Burlington, NC	1	70		
25	VA Bombers (Adam Page and Jason Blade)	January 8, 2011	New Year's Knockout	Burlington, NC	1	224		
26	Coach Gemini's All Stars (Roy Wilkins and Walter Eaton)	August 20, 2011	Johnny Weaver Memorial Tournament	Burlington, NC	1	56	This was a handicap match.	
27	Semper Ferocious (Bobby Wohlfert and Devin Dalton)	October 15, 2011	CWF Rumble	Burlington, NC	1	35		
28	Coach Gemini's All Stars (Roy Wilkins and Walter Eaton)	November 19, 2011	Ultimate Survivor IX	Burlington, NC	2	84	This was a Steel Cage match.	
29	Arik Royal and Chiva Kid	February 11, 2012	Casualties of War	Greensboro, NC	1	84		
30	Killbillies (Aric Andrews and Evan Banks)	May 5, 2012	Homecoming	Burlington, NC	1	238		
31	Roy Wilkins and Walter Eaton	December 29, 2012	Battlecade XIII	Gibsonville, NC	3	168		
32	Ric Converse and Xsiris	June 15, 2013	Absolute Justice	Gibsonville, NC	1	84		
33	Lee Valiant and The Kamakazi Kid	September 7, 2013	Wild Things	Gibsonville, NC	1	126		
34	Rage And The Machine (Michael McAllister and The Mecha Mercenary)	January 11, 2014	New Year's Knockout	Gibsonville, NC	1	126		
35	Killbillies (Aric Andrews and Evan Banks)	May 17, 2014	Homecoming	Gibsonville, NC	2	140	This was winner takes all match where CWF Mid-Atlantic Heavyweight Title also defended by Arik Royal.	
36	Jason Miller and Nick Richards	October 4, 2014	14th Annual Rumble	Gibsonville, NC	1	84		
37	Chet Sterling and Trevor Lee	December 27, 2014	Battlecade XV	Gibsonville, NC	1	343		
38	Arik Royal and Ray Kandrack	December 5, 2015	Road To Battlecade 16	Gibsonville, NC	1	196		
39	Aaron Biggs and Mecha Mercenary	June 18, 2016	Absolute Justice	Gibsonville, NC	1	329		
40	Dave Dawson and Zane Dawson	May 13, 2017	Double Or Nothing	Gibsonville, NC	1	392		
41	Michael McAllister and Nick Richards	June 9, 2018	Absolute Justice	Gibsonville, NC	1	49	This was a Winner takes all match for PWI International Heavyweight Title, PWI Ultra J Title, CWF Mid-Atlantic Heavyweight Title and CWF Mid-Atlantic Television Title where all titles were defended by their respective champions.	
42	Cain Justice and Ethan Alexander Sharpe	July 28, 2018	Oh What A Summer!	Gibsonville, NC	1	28		
43	The Blazing Saddles (Kool Jay and Michael McAllister)	August 25, 2018	Johnny Weaver Memorial Cup 2018 Finals	Gibsonville, NC	1	84		
44	Michael McAllister and Nick Richards	November 17, 2018	Ultimate Survivor	Gibsonville, NC	2	91	This was a four-way match.	
45	Donald J. BitDon and Otto Schwanz	February 16, 2019	End Of An Era	Gibsonville, NC	1	77		
46	Teddy Ireland Jr. and Ulysse Demos	May 4, 2019	The 3rd Annual Kernodle Tag Team Tournament – Night II	Gibsonville, NC	1	28	This was also 3rd Annual Kernodle Tag Team Tournament semifinal match.	
47	Bellamy Koga and Dirty Daddy	June 1, 2019	Absolute Justice	Gibsonville, NC	1	56	This was an Everything To Lose match where PWI International Heavyweight Title, PWI Central Carolinas Title and CWF Mid-Atlantic Rising Generation League Title are on the line by their respective champions and winner gets all the titles.	
48	The All-Stars (Arik Royal and Roy Wilkins)	July 27, 2019	Oh What A Summer!	Gibsonville, NC	1	42		
49	The Pineapple Express (Buddy Flowers and Number Braaah)	September 7, 2019	Night Of Reckoning	Gibsonville, NC	1	42	This was a Handicap match.	
50	Corruption (Dirty Daddy and Killer Koga)	October 19, 2019	The Fright Stuff	Gibsonville, NC	2	70	This was a Trick or Treat match.	
51	Aaron Biggs and Mike Mars	December 28, 2019	Battlecade XX	Burlington, NC	1	3		
	Retired	December 31, 2019	N/A	N/A	—	—		
