= CWF Mid-Atlantic =

American independent wrestling federation

Carolina Wrestling Federation Mid-Atlantic Mid-Atlantic Sports, LLC
- Acronym: CWF Mid-Atlantic
- Founded: 1996
- Style: Canadian Wrestling
- Headquarters: Burlington, North Carolina, United States
- Founder(s): Jeff Rudd and Danny Wenkel
- Owner(s): Jeff Rudd (1996-); Danny Wenkel (1996-)
- Parent: AWA Superstars (2005-2007); Frontier Wrestling Alliance (2001-2004)
- Sister: CWF Arena Chicks
- Formerly: FWA-Carolinas (2001-2004); Carolina Wrestling Federation (1996-2001)
- Website: Official website

Carolina Wrestling Federation Mid-Atlantic (CWF Mid-Atlantic, formerly known as the Carolina Wrestling Federation and FWA-Carolinas) was an American independent professional wrestling promotion founded by Jeff Rudd in 2000. The promotion is based in the southeastern United States, largely covering the Carolinas and Virginia, with its headquarters in Burlington, North Carolina. It is one of the oldest "indy" groups in North Carolina, succeeding Count Grog's Southern Championship Wrestling as the state's top promotion shortly before its close in 2004.

CWF Mid-Atlantic was one of 32 territories affiliated with AWA Superstars from 2005 to 2007, officially representing the mid-Atlantic region, until Dale Gagne was forced by a court order to cease licensing under the American Wrestling Association name. Many of the top wrestlers in the Southeastern independents have competed for the promotion including C. W. Anderson, Caprice Coleman, Shane Helms, Shannon Moore, Cham Pain, Rob "The Bull" McBride, Otto Schwanz, The Dupps (Bo and Stan Dupp), and Team MACKtion ("Krazy K" Kirby Mack and T.J. Mack). It also had a working relationship with the UK's Frontier Wrestling Alliance bringing in such stars as "The Anarchist" Doug Williams, Jodie Fleisch, Jonny Storm, Alex Shane, Flash Barker, Drew McDonald, British Women's Champion Sweet Saraya, and FWA-UK Commissioner Victoria Demonfort.

The promotion enjoyed a long association with Mid-Atlantic wrestling legend Johnny Weaver, who was a commentator and presenter of the annual Johnny Weaver Invitational tournament until his death in 2008. Rocky and Don Kernodle, Sandy Scott, Jimmy Valiant, Ivan and Nikita Koloff, Boris Zhukov, "Rowdy" Roddy Piper, manager J. J. Dillon, announcers Bob Caudle and Rich Landrum, and referee Tommy Young, all fellow Mid-Atlantic stars in the 1970s and 80s, have appeared for CWF Mid-Atlantic as well as Ring of Honor's Ricky Reyes and the World Wrestling Federation's D-Lo Brown and "Dr. Death" Steve Williams.

CWF Mid-Atlantic is also an important organization for women's wrestling in the Southeast. Its women's division has included former WWF Women's Tag Team Champions Desiree Petersen and Leilani Kai, and younger wrestlers Brandi Alexander, Lexie Fyfe, Jazz, Alexis Laree, Lorelei Lee, MsChif, Amber O'Neal, and Special K (later known as Krissy Vaine).

On November 15, 2019, all future shows for the promotion were postponed, leaving the federation's future operation in doubt. The federation did go forward with its Battlecade XX event on December 28, 2019.

== History ==
=== Formation and early years ===
Jeff Rudd, who wrestled under the name "The Gemini Kid", founded the Carolina Wrestling Federation in Burlington, North Carolina, in 1996. Rudd had previously wrestled in Eddie Gilbert's Continental Wrestling Federation with Mike Howell, who also had some involvement in the Alabama-based organization, and named their new promotion the "Carolina Wrestling Federation" (CWF) to honor Gilbert (who had died the previous year). They began running shows in Durham and other parts of North Carolina off and on during the late 1990s, though the promotion was run on a part-time basis due to their work for OMEGA and other local independents.

Following the close of OMEGA in 1999, with Matt and Jeff Hardy joining the World Wrestling Federation, Rudd decided to begin running the CWF again. Rudd hoped the promotion would fulfill OMEGA's previous role to showcase younger talent in North Carolina as well as to recreate the "fun atmosphere" enjoyed by former OMEGA stars. The following year, the promotion crowned its first champions; David Taylor, The Gemini Kid, and The Dupps (Bo Dupp and Stan Dupp), as the CWF Mid-Atlantic Heavyweight, Cruiserweight and Tag Team Champions, respectively.

=== Territorial reach ===
CWF Mid-Atlantic was initially based in Durham, North Carolina. It later moved to Burlington, where it established the Carolina Sports Arena (renamed the Mid-Atlantic Sportatorium in 2009), an industrial building near the Burlington-Alamance Regional Airport, as its home arena and official wrestling school. In spite of the large number of promotions in the state, they were eventually able to expand the CWF to cover a sizable area of the southeastern United States, based primarily in the Carolinas and Virginia. Though most of its supercards are run out of the Carolina Sports Arena in Gibsonville, CWF Mid-Atlantic event tours have also included national guard armories, high school gyms and fairs in cities including Asheboro, Bear Creek, Cameron, Clayton, Elkin, Graham, Liberty, Mount Airy, Oxford, Pfafftown, Pleasant Garden, Ramseur, Roxboro, Seagrove, Statesville, Thomasville, Wentworth, and Wilson in North Carolina; Manning, Myrtle Beach, and Sharon in South Carolina; and Martinsville, Virginia. Also, a few shows were held at Ace Speedway in Altamahaw, North Carolina, and the Greensboro Coliseum and Proehlific Sports Complex in Greensboro, North Carolina.

Its weekly television series, "CWF Championship Wrestling", was carried by Adelphia Cable, Charter Communications, Lexcom, Piedmont Cable, and Time Warner and syndicated throughout the region. By 2003, the series was being broadcast locally on then-UPN affiliate WUPN (now MyNetworkTV affiliate WMYV) and PAX station WGPX-TV, then the highest rated PAX affiliate in the country, reaching an audience of 1,500,000 in the Piedmont area alone and seen in at least 16 counties in North Carolina and Virginia. A year later, it was airing in over 50 cities and towns. It was later broadcast on the internet as well via Highspots.TV and CWF's official YouTube channel. CWF Mid-Atlantic additional exposure though its involvement in numerous fundraisers for charities, school clubs, civic groups, and similar organizations such as ARC of Alamance, American Red Cross and the Special Olympics. One of its most notable efforts was helping raise money for the Red Cross and Salvation Army, along with Don Kernodle, in the days following the September 11 terrorist attacks. They also held events for individuals in need of financial assistance to pay for medical expenses. On August 20, 2005, CWF Mid Atlantic held a benefit show in King, North Carolina, for an 11-year-old wrestling fan, Stephen Arrowood, who was left paralyzed from the waist-down following emergency surgery to remove a cancerous tumor from his spinal cord.

The following year CWF Mid Atlantic promoted a lucha libre-themed event for Burlington's annual International Cultural Festival held at the Downtown Amphitheatre. The card featured Marcellus King and Señor Sábado Noche in a "lighting" (Relámpago) match and a Best 2 out of 3 Falls Trios match pitting Ultra Dragon, the Kamakazi Kid, and Brass Munkey against El Gemini, El Sucio, and Double K which lasted nearly an hour. The promotion had appeared at last year's festival and the success of the lucha libre show led to CWF Mid Atlantic becoming a regular attraction.

=== Notable talent ===
The promotion featured some of top wrestlers in the Southern independents and provided an environment for younger talent, including C. W. Anderson, Caprice Coleman, Shane Helms, Tank Lawson, Rob "The Bull" McBride, Shannon Moore, Cham Pain, Scotty Sabre, Seymour Snott, The Dupps (Bo and Stan Dupp), The Naturals (Andy Douglas and Chase Stevens), and Team MACKtion ("Krazy K" Kirby Mack and T.J. Mack). Ricky Reyes of Ring of Honor, World Wrestling Entertainment's D-Lo Brown and "Dr. Death" Steve Williams have also made appearances for the promotion. It later enhanced its roster through working agreements with the Frontier Wrestling Alliance and AWA Superstars.

Johnny Weaver had a long association with CWF Mid-Atlantic, working as a guest commentator and presenter of the annual Johnny Weaver Invitational tournament up until his death in 2008. The 2007 Johnny Weaver Tournament was his last public appearance at a professional wrestling event. Other former Mid-Atlantic stars to appear in the promotion included brothers Rocky and Don Kernodle, Sandy Scott, Jimmy Valiant, Ivan and Nikita Koloff, Boris Zhukov, The Barbarian, "Rowdy" Roddy Piper, manager J. J. Dillon, announcers Bob Caudle and Rich Landrum, and referee Tommy Young. David Flair, the oldest son of former 7-time NWA World Heavyweight Championship "The Nature Boy" Ric Flair, also wrestled for the promotion on occasion.

Rusty Loudermilk was a CWF mainstay, occupying a number of roles including sports agent and manager (under his alter-ego Rusty James).

=== Affiliation with other independent promotions ===
In February 2001, CWF Mid-Atlantic became an official affiliate promotion for the Frontier Wrestling Alliance based in the United Kingdom. This was part of an association of independent wrestling groups in North America and Europe headed by the FWA. It was one of two promotions in the United States, along with FWA Texas, and subsequently changed its name to "FWA-Carolinas". This new international working agreement saw the sharing of talent and interpromotional events. "The Anarchist" Doug Williams, Jodie Fleisch, Jonny Storm, Alex Shane, Flash Barker, Drew McDonald, British Women's Champion Sweet Saraya, and FWA-UK Commissioner Victoria Demonfort were among the FWA stars to appear for the CWF during the next three years.

It was around this time that state legislation which put professional wrestling under the jurisdiction of the state's boxing commission threatened to shut down many, if not all, of the independent promotions operating in North Carolina. The cost of promoters to put on a wrestling show was tripled due to state regulation and put severe financial burdens on an industry which was already in a recession in the years following the "Attitude Era". CWF Mid-Atlantic was heavily involved in the campaign to stop the H-232 bill. The promotion's website provided fans with up-to-date information and encouraged them to contact their representatives. The efforts of Jeff Rudd in particular, through Senator Hugh Webster, helped eventually remove pro wrestling from the bill.

Count Grog's Southern Championship Wrestling, widely regarded as the state's top indy promotion, closed down in 2004. Many other promotions were forced to cease operations during this period which were absorbed by CWF Mid-Atlantic to some extent. The same year that SCW closed, it jointly promoted the final shows for Alternative Championship Wrestling (January 31, 2004) and South Atlantic Wrestling (November 27, 2004) in which both promotions were formerly merged with CWF Mid-Atlantic. East Coast Pro Wrestling, another closely associated promotion, was also incorporated into the CWF.

=== AWA Superstars ===
The promotion had a three-year association with AWA Superstars (AWA), one of 32 territories across the continental United States, with CWF Mid-Atlantic officially representing the Mid-Atlantic United States. Their membership in the AWA allowed the promotion to use its talent and many of its world champions, among those including CWF's own wrestlers, made title defenses on CWF live events when touring the region. Their own titles were renamed "AWA Mid-Atlantic" with all their events sanctioned by the organization.

Key moments in the AWA-CWF relationship included Ric Converse capturing the AWA World Heavyweight Championship from Takao Omori on June 14, 2006, and his subsequent feud with Steve Corino over the title. Both Xsiris and T.J. Mack held the AWA World Light Heavyweight Championship and The New Generation Dynasty (Ric Converse and Xsiris) held the AWA World Tag Team Championship. On December 2, 2006, CWF Mid Atlantic hosted a major AWA supercard at the Carolina Sports Arena with many of its fellow AWA affiliates AWA Apex Wrestling (West Virginia), AWA Slam (Chicago), AWA Brew City Wrestling (Wisconsin), AWA World Star Wrestling (Connecticut, Pennsylvania, and Ohio), AWA North Atlantic (Maine), and AWA Power Pro Wrestling (North Carolina). The semi-main event featured T.J. Mack interfering in a title unification ladder match between Kirby Mack and Xsiris to win the AWA World Light Heavyweight title, and Rob McBride and Tank Lawson defeating the Old School Blondes (Steve Corino and Ricky Landell) to win the AWA World Tag Team titles.

While champions, Converse and Xsiris defended the belts in a four-way "title vs. career" match against AWA Mid-Atlantic Tag Team Champions Rob McBride and Tank Lawson, AWA Mid-Atlantic Heavyweight Champion Joey Silvia and AWA Mid-Atlantic Television Champion "Simply" Steve Greene, and Neon Lions (Chris Collins and Lee Valiant) at CWF's "Absolute Justice" on June 16, 2007. It was during this time that Dale Gagne, owner of AWA Superstars, was involved in a lawsuit with World Wrestling Entertainment over the use of the AWA name. Many affiliate promotions were dropped by the organization in early-2007 with the AWA officially terminating the sanctioning rights with CWF Mid-Atlantic as of July 29, 2007.

=== Recent years ===
After their departure from AWA Superstars, CWF Mid-Atlantic continued their interpromotional activities. Two months before leaving the AWA, on May 19, 2007, CWF Mid-Atlantic held three live events in three different states; a Carolina Sports Arena television taping in Burlington, NC, a joint show with South Atlantic Wrestling at Hooker Stadium in Martinsville, VA, and a house show in Sharon, SC.

They also joined another international governing body, Pro Wrestling International, which included US-based promotions in Florida, Georgia, North Carolina, and Texas as well as in Australia, the Netherlands, New Zealand, and the United Kingdom. Like their previous arraignment with the AWA, all members shared talent and recognized the PWI Ultra J-Crown Championship which was defended at live events by all involved. In the CWF, it was defending at many shows including at least two supercards. On November 14, 2009, a PWI event involving CWF Mid-Atlantic, Premier Wrestling Showcase, and Rider's Championship Wrestling was held at the Mid-Atlantic Sportatorium in Burlington, North Carolina.

In January 2011, CWF Mid-Atlantic co-promoted a show with Dragon Gate USA at the Carolina Sports Arena. On April 1, 2011, the PWI International Heavyweight Championship changed hands between Ric Converse and Shane Helms at the Mid-Atlantic Sportatorium in Burlington, North Carolina.

=== Postponement of all future events ===
On November 15, 2019, a post was made on the official website for CWF Mid-Atlantic announcing that all future events were postponed. The announcement suggested that "Our future is now going to be much different." The federation did go forward with its Battlecade XX event on December 28, 2019. No announcement or events have happened since, however, leaving the future of the federation in doubt.

== Women's wrestling ==
CWF Mid-Atlantic is a major promotion in the Southeastern United States for women's wrestling. Among the female wrestlers to compete for the promotion have included former WWF Women's Tag Team Champions Desiree Petersen and Leilani Kai as well as independent stars such as Brandi Alexander, Lexie Fyfe, GeeStar, Alexis Laree, Lorelei Lee, MsChif, Amber O'Neal, Persephone, Special K, (later known as Krissy Vaine). O'Neal, a former FWA-Carolinas Women's Champion, was a top contender for Sherri Martel's AWA Women's Championship while competing for CWF Mid-Atlantic and, on occasion, acted as special guest referee and took part in both intergender and mixed tag team matches.

In May 2010, the promotion formed a partnership with Amber O'Neal's Arena Chicks promotion. With its assistance, Arena Chicks was able to produce its first DVD release, ArenaChicks, Volume 1, using matches held at the Mid-Atlantic Sportatorium including mixed tag matches with male CWF wrestlers. On February 5, 2011, CWF Mid-Atlantic's “End of an Era, Part 1″ supercard at the Mid-Atlantic Sportatorium featured an interpromotional match between and Amber O’Neal and Jazz, the latter making her Arena Chicks debut. This match was included on the DVD release of ArenaChicks, Volume 2 that same year.

== Championships and programing ==
Championship	Notes
CWF Mid-Atlantic Heavyweight Championship	The heavyweight title of CWF Mid-Atlantic. It was established in 2000 and remains the promotion's top single's title.
CWF Mid-Atlantic Tag Team Championship	The tag team title of CWF Mid-Atlantic. It was established in 2000 and remains the promotion's main tag team title.
CWF Mid-Atlantic Television Championship	The television title of CWF Mid-Atlantic. It was established as a cruiserweight championship in 2000 and defended until 2004. It was reactivated two years later.
CWF Mid-Atlantic Rising Generation League Championship	The title was established in 2002 under FWA-Carolinas and continues to be defended within CWF Mid-Atlantic.
PWI International Heavyweight Championship	

=== Johnny Weaver Memorial Tournament winners ===
CWF Mid-Atlantic has held an annual open invitational tournament in honor of Johnny Weaver since 2004. It is typically a standard 8 or 16-man single-elimination tournament held annually in early May or late July with the finals ending at the end of August. The event not only showcased many of the younger wrestlers on the Southern independent circuit but also featured guest appearances by stars from the old Mid-Atlantic wrestling territory. Weaver regularly attended these events and would traditionally present the winner with the "Johnny Weaver Cup". Following his death in 2008, it was turned into a memorial tournament and an award ceremony for fellow Mid-Atlantic wrestling legends. At the 2009 Johnny Weaver Cup, brothers Don and Rocky Kernodle, Jimmy Valiant, and Rich Landrum were all honored at the event. Wendi Weaver, the daughter of Johnny Weaver, also attended the event to accept the award on her father's behalf. Their new home arena, the Mid-Atlantic Sportatorium, was dedicated to the memory of the late Johnny Weaver.

Year	Name	Date	Location	Notes
2004	Corey Edsel	July 31-August 28, 2004	Burlington and Thomasville, North Carolina	
2005	Jesse Ortega	June 25-August 27, 2005	Burlington, North Carolina	
2006	Gemini Kid	May 13-August 26, 2006	Greensboro and Burlington, North Carolina	
2007	Mitch Connor	June 23-August 25, 2007	Greensboro and Burlington, North Carolina	Mitch Connor was also awarded a title shot for the CWF Mid-Atlantic Heavyweight Championship.
2008	Brass Munkey	June 21-August 16, 2008	Burlington, North Carolina	The tournament final was a three-way match involving Marcellus King and Ric Converse.
2009	Kamakazi Kid	June 20-August 15, 2009	Oxford and Burlington, North Carolina	
2010	Ric Converse	August 20, 2010	Burlington, North Carolina	
2011	Arik Royal	August 20, 2011	Burlington, North Carolina	
2012	Arik Royal	August 25, 2012	Gibsonville, North Carolina	
2013	Trevor Lee	August 17, 2013	Gibsonville, North Carolina	
2014	Brad Attitude	August 23, 2014	Gibsonville, North Carolina	
2015	Roy Wilkins	August 29, 2015	Gibsonville, North Carolina	

=== Programming ===
Programming	Notes
CWF Championship Wrestling	(2002–2005) Syndicated, also broadcast on UPN and the PAX Network.
CWF Worldwide	(2015–) broadcast every Wednesday at 9pm EST on YouTube.
