= Cotton Bowl Extravaganza =

Professional wrestling supercard promoted by WCCW

- Promotions: World Class Championship Wrestling
- First event: 1984
- Last event: 1988
- Event gimmick: All events were held at the Cotton Bowl in Dallas, Texas.

The Cotton Bowl Extravaganza was an annual professional wrestling supercard event promoted by Fritz Von Erich's World Class Championship Wrestling (WCCW). It was held in October every year from 1984 through 1988. All Cotton Bowl Extravaganza events were held at the Cotton Bowl in Dallas, Texas.

== Events ==
| # | Event | Date | City | Venue | Main event |
|---|---|---|---|---|---|
| 1 | 1st Cotton Bowl Extravaganza | October 27, 1984 | Dallas, Texas | Cotton Bowl | Bobby Fulton, Kerry Von Erich and Mike Von Erich (c) vs. Jake Roberts and The Dynamic Duo (Chris Adams and Gino Hernandez) for the WCCW Six-Man Tag Team Championship |
| 2 | 2nd Cotton Bowl Extravaganza | October 6, 1985 | Dallas, Texas | Cotton Bowl | The Cosmic Cowboys (Kevin Von Erich and Kerry Von Erich) (c) vs. The Dynamic Duo (Chris Adams and Gino Hernandez) in a hair vs. hair no disqualification match for the NWA American Tag Team Championship |
| 3 | 3rd Cotton Bowl Extravaganza | October 12, 1986 | Dallas, Texas | Cotton Bowl | Bruiser Brody vs. Abdullah the Butcher with Fritz Von Erich as the special guest referee |
| 4 | 4th Cotton Bowl Extravaganza | October 17, 1987 | Dallas, Texas | Cotton Bowl | Al Perez (c) vs. Kevin Von Erich for the WCWA World Heavyweight Championship |
| 5 | 5th Cotton Bowl Extravaganza | October 15, 1988 | Dallas, Texas | Cotton Bowl | Kerry Von Erich (c - WCWA) vs. Jerry Lawler (c - AWA) in a title unification Texas Deathmatch for the AWA World Heavyweight Championship and the WCWA World Heavyweight Championship |

== Show results ==
=== 1st Cotton Bowl Extravaganza ===
1st Cotton Bowl Extravaganza
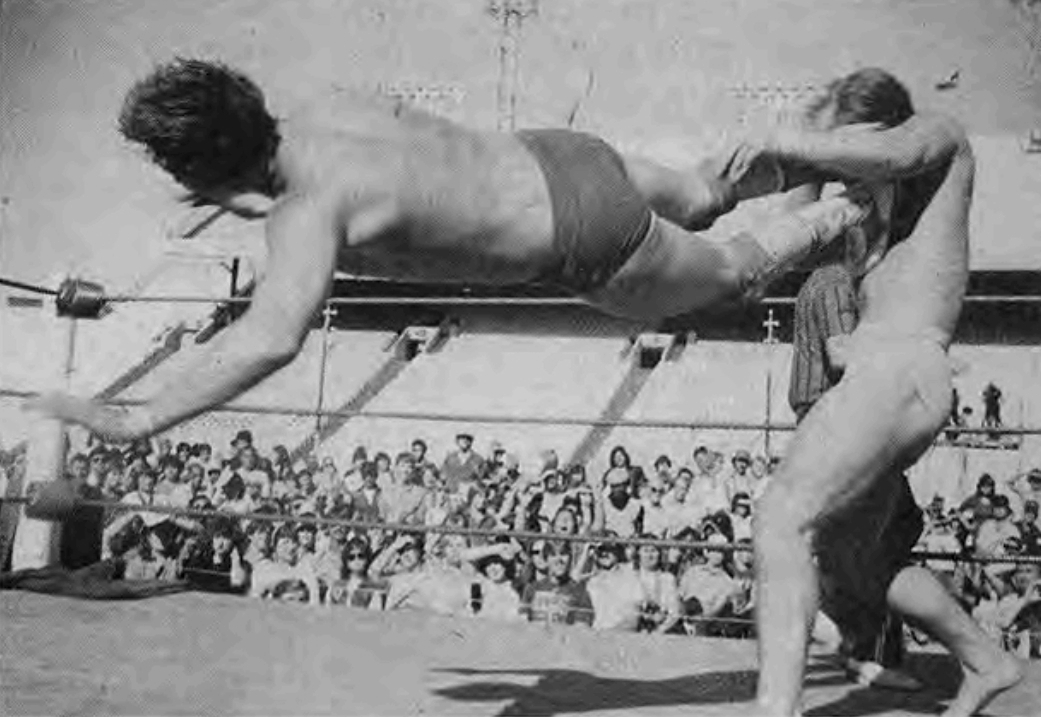
- Promotion: World Class Championship Wrestling
- Date: October 27, 1984
- City: Dallas, Texas
- Venue: Cotton Bowl
- Attendance: 12,000

Event chronology
| ← Previous; Labor Day Star Wars | Next → Thanksgiving Star Wars |

The Cotton Bowl Extravaganza chronology
| ← Previous; First | Next → 2nd Extravaganza |

The 1st Cotton Bowl Extravaganza was a major professional wrestling show held by the Dallas, Texas based World Class Championship Wrestling (WCCW) promotion on October 27, 1984, at the Cotton Bowl football stadium in Dallas. The ninth match of the night between Kevin Von Erich and Chris Adams ended in controversy as Kevin pinned Adams while Adams twice had his shoulder up, while referee David Manning administered the three count. After the match, Adams smashed a wooden chair over Von Erich's head, resulting in a concussion and loss of blood when the chair broken in half, scraping his head. This was used as a storyline excuse to replace Kevin Von Erich in the main event with Bobby Fulton for the six-man tag team match.

| No. | Results | Stipulations | Times |
|---|---|---|---|
| 1 | Iceman Parsons vs. Butch Reed ended in a time-limit draw | Singles match | 15:00 |
| 2 | Killer Khan defeated Jules Strongbow | Singles match | — |
| 3 | Norvell Austin vs. Skip Young ended in a draw | Singles match | — |
| 4 | Buck Zumhofe defeated Koko Ware | Singles match | — |
| 5 | The Missing Link defeated George Weingroff | Singles match | — |
| 6 | Kerry Von Erich defeated Butch Reed | arm wrestling match | — |
| 7 | The Fantastics (Bobby Fulton and Tommy Rogers) (c) defeated El Diablo and Kelly Kiniski | Tag team match for the NWA American Tag Team Championship | — |
| 8 | Mike Von Erich and Stella Mae French defeated Gino Hernandez and Andrea the Lady Giant | mixed tag team match | — |
| 9 | Kevin Von Erich defeated Chris Adams | Singles match | — |
| 10 | The Dynamic Duo (Chris Adams and Gino Hernandez) and Jake Roberts defeated Bobby Fulton (subbing for Kevin Von Erich), Kerry Von Erich and Mike Von Erich (c) | Six-man tag team match for the WCCW Six-Man Tag Team Championship | — |
(c) / – the champion(s) heading into the match

=== 2nd Cotton Bowl Extravaganza ===
2nd Cotton Bowl Extravaganza
- Promotion: World Class Championship Wrestling
- Date: October 6, 1985
- City: Dallas, Texas
- Venue: Cotton Bowl
- Attendance: 26,000

Event chronology
| ← Previous; Labor Day Star Wars | Next → Thanksgiving Star Wars |

The Cotton Bowl Extravaganza chronology
| ← Previous; 1st Extravaganza | Next → 3rd Extravaganza |

The 2nd Cotton Bowl Extravaganza was a major professional wrestling show held by the Dallas, Texas based World Class Championship Wrestling (WCCW) promotion on October 6, 1985, at the Cotton Bowl football stadium in Dallas. The main event saw the team of Kerry and Kevin Von Erich defeated The Dynamic Duo (Chris Adams and Gino Hernandez) when Kerry pinned Adams. After the match, Adams and Hernandez were shaved bald. Gino attempted to escape during the hair-cutting, but was tackled by Chris Von Erich at ringside. Cousin Lance Von Erich made his World Class debut in this match.

| No. | Results | Stipulations |
|---|---|---|
| 1 | Killer Tim Brooks defeated Scott Casey | Singles match |
| 2 | Kelly Kiniski defeated Tommy Montana | Singles match |
| 3 | The Fantastics (Bobby Fulton and Tommy Rogers) defeated Dave Peterson and John Tatum | Tag team match |
| 4 | The Great Kabuki defeated Mark Lewin by disqualification | Singles match |
| 5 | Brian Adias (c) defeated Jack Victory | Singles match for the NWA Texas Heavyweight Championship |
| 6 | Iceman Parsons (c) defeated One Man Gang | Taped Fist match for the NWA American Heavyweight Champion |
| 7 | Kerry and Kevin Von Erich defeated The Dynamic Duo (Chris Adams and Gino Hernandez) | Hair vs. Hair match |
(c) / – the champion(s) heading into the match

=== 3rd Cotton Bowl Extravaganza ===
3rd Cotton Bowl Extravaganza
- Promotion: World Class Wrestling Association
- Date: October 12, 1986
- City: Dallas, Texas
- Venue: Cotton Bowl
- Attendance: 5,835

Event chronology
| ← Previous; Labor Day Star Wars | Next → Thanksgiving Star Wars |

The Cotton Bowl Extravaganza chronology
| ← Previous; 2nd Extravaganza | Next → 4th Extravaganza |

The 3rd Cotton Bowl Extravaganza was a major professional wrestling show held by the Dallas, Texas based World Class Wrestling Association (WCWA) promotion on October 12, 1986, at the Cotton Bowl football stadium in Dallas. Ricky Steamboat who worked on the undercard was under contract with the World Wrestling Federation (WWF) but they allowed him to work the WCCW show.

| No. | Results | Stipulations | Times |
|---|---|---|---|
| 1 | Scott Casey defeated The Grappler | Singles match | 08:10 |
| 2 | Matt Borne and Buzz Sawyer (c) defeated Dingo Warrior and Steve Simpson by disqualification | Tag team match for the WCWA World Tag Team Championship | — |
| 3 | Crusher Yurkoff defeated Brian Adias | Singles match | 09:24 |
| 4 | Mike Von Erich defeated Spike Johnson | Singles match | 06:21 |
| 5 | Chris and Mark Youngblood defeated The Batten Twins (Bart and Brad Batten) | Tag team match | 09:02 |
| 6 | Ricky Steamboat defeated Mighty Zulu | Singles match | — |
| 7 | Kevin Von Erich defeated Black Bart (c) | Singles match for the WCWA World Heavyweight Championship | 06:22 |
| 8 | Bruiser Brody defeated Abdullah the Butcher | Steel cage match with guest referee Fritz Von Erich | — |
(c) / – the champion(s) heading into the match

=== 4th Cotton Bowl Extravaganza ===
4th Cotton Bowl Extravaganza
- Promotion: World Class Wrestling Association
- Date: October 17, 1987
- City: Dallas, Texas
- Venue: Cotton Bowl
- Attendance: 3,700

Event chronology
| ← Previous; Labor Day Star Wars | Next → Thanksgiving Star Wars |

The Cotton Bowl Extravaganza chronology
| ← Previous; 3rd Extravaganza | Next → 5th Extravaganza |

The 4th Cotton Bowl Extravaganza was a major professional wrestling show held by the Dallas, Texas based World Class Wrestling Association (WCWA) promotion on October 17, 1987, at the Cotton Bowl football stadium in Dallas. In the main event it appeared that Kevin Von Erich defeated Al Perez to win the WCWA Heavyweight Championship, but the championship was later returned to Al Perez due to outside interference during the match and Kevin Von Erich was not officially considered the champion.

| No. | Results | Stipulations |
|---|---|---|
| 1 | Mil Máscaras, Al Madril and Manny Villalobos defeated Vince Apollo, Tony Falk and Frankie Lancaster | Six-Man tag team match |
| 2 | Bruiser Brody won | Multi-man battle royal |
| 3 | Eric Embry (c) defeated Shaun Simpson | Singles match for the WCWA Light Heavyweight Championship |
| 4 | Kevin Von Erich defeated Al Perez (c) | Singles match for the WCWA World Heavyweight Championship |
(c) / – the champion(s) heading into the match

=== 5th Cotton Bowl Extravaganza ===
5th Cotton Bowl Extravaganza
- Promotion: World Class Wrestling Association
- Date: October 15, 1988
- City: Dallas, Texas
- Venue: Cotton Bowl
- Attendance: 4,500

Event chronology
| ← Previous; Parade of Champions 5 | Next → SuperClash III |

The Cotton Bowl Extravaganza chronology
| ← Previous; 4th Extravaganza | Next → Last |

The 5th Cotton Bowl Extravaganza was a major professional wrestling show held by the Dallas, Texas based World Class Wrestling Association (WCWA) promotion on October 15, 1988, at the Cotton Bowl football stadium in Dallas. The main event match had both the WCWA World Heavyweight Championship and the AWA World Heavyweight Championship on the line as Kerry Von Erich faced off against AWA Champion Jerry Lawler. Von Erich won the match and left the arena with the AWA Championship it was later returned to Jerry Lawler and not officially recognized by the AWA.

| No. | Results | Stipulations |
|---|---|---|
| 1 | Steve Casey defeated Tug Tyler | Singles match |
| 2 | Jimmy Valiant and The Macho Midget defeated Killer Tim Brooks and The Million Dollar Baby | Tag team match |
| 3 | Chigusa Nagayo (c) defeated Candi Divine | Singles match for the AJW All Pacific Championship |
| 4 | Super Black Ninja defeated Vince Apollo, Tony Torres, Bob Bradley and Tom Jones | 4-on-1 Handicap match |
| 5 | Bill Irwin and Blackjack Mulligan defeated Black Bart and Jimmy Jack Funk | Tag team match |
| 6 | Iceman Parsons (c) and Kendall Windham ended in a double count-out | Singles match for the WCWA Texas Heavyweight Championship |
| 7 | Jeff Jarrett defeated Eric Embry (c) | Singles match for the WCWA Light Heavyweight Championship |
| 8 | Kevin Von Erich defeated Brian Adias by disqualification | Singles match |
| 9 | Terry Gordy vs. The Botswana Beast ended in a no contest | Dog Collar match |
| 10 | Steve Cox and Michael Hayes (w/Harvey Martin) defeated The Samoan Swat Team (Samu and Fatu) (c) | Texas Tornado match for the WCWA World Tag Team Championship |
| 11 | Kerry Von Erich (c - WCWA) defeated Jerry Lawler (c - AWA) | Texas Death match for the WCWA World Heavyweight Championship and the AWA World Heavyweight Championship |
(c) / – the champion(s) heading into the match
