= Scott Braddock =

American professional wrestler

Personal information
- Born: Texas, United States

Professional wrestling career
- Ring name(s): Corporal Braddock; Scott Braddock; Scotty Braddock; Sheik Braddock
- Debut: 1988
- Retired: 1993

Scott Braddock is an American retired professional wrestler who competed in North American regional promotions during the 1980s and early 1990s including the Global Wrestling Federation, the United States Wrestling Association and World Class Championship Wrestling. While in WCCW, he was known under the name "Sheik" Scott Braddock as a member of manager Skandor Akbar's "heel" stable Devastation Inc. and was an early ally of "Stunning" Steve Austin during his feud with former mentor Chris Adams.

He was also part of Robert Fuller's "Stud Stable" with "Rotten" Ron Starr and Cactus Jack, the group being involved in a memorable feud with Matt Borne and Jeff Jarrett, and later won the WCWA World Tag Team Championship with Cactus Jack in 1989. They were the last team to hold the titles when WCCW merged with the Continental Wrestling Association to form the USWA and, as a result, he and Cactus Jack were recognized as the first tag team champions in the new promotion.

== Professional wrestling career ==
=== World Class Championship Wrestling (1988-1990) ===
Braddock began wrestling for promoter Fritz von Erich in World Class Championship Wrestling around 1988. In mid-1989, he became a member of manager Robert Fuller's "Stud Stable", which included "Rotten" Ron Starr and Cactus Jack, and became involved in a heated feud with Matt Borne and Jeff Jarrett. He and Cactus Jack, later stablemates in Skandor Akbar's Devastation Inc., began teaming together eventually winning the WCWA World Tag Team Championship from Borne and Jarrett in Dallas, Texas on August 4, 1989. This was the last WCCW event held at the Dallas Sportatorium. During that time, both WCCW and the CWA merged to form the United States Wrestling Alliance. Braddock and Cactus Jack were recognized by the USWA as the promotion's first tag team champions before losing the titles back to Borne and Jarrett a week later. Braddock won the titles once more, this time with Ron Starr, defeating them in Dallas on September 15. The title was held up in a September 22 rematch with him and Starr losing the titles to Borne and Jarrett the following week. The feud ended after Borne lost a "Loser-Leaves-Town" match in November. Jarrett briefly found an ally in a young Jeff Gaylord, but found more success as a singles wrestler. That same year, he wrestled Jimmy Jack Funk in one of the earliest shows aired on "USWA on ESPN" from the Dallas Sportatorium. Braddock and Starr would also face Jarrett and Funk in a tag team match.

=== United States Wrestling Association (1990-1992) ===
Since the start of 1989, Braddock was one of the WCCW veterans used primarily in "USWA Texas". Like most of the roster however, Braddock would eventually spend much of the next year traveling to and from Dallas and Memphis as the promotion focused on those two areas. One of his earliest matches in Memphis was a 6-man tag team match with Jeff Gaylord and PY Chu Hi against Jimmy Jack Funk, Chico Torres and Chris Adams on January 13, 1990. He also faced, and lost, to Junkyard Dog in Alexandria, Louisiana on January 30. During the next month, Braddock and Gaylord faced Jimmy Jack Funk in tag team matches with Dustin Rhodes and Dutch Mantel. On February 23, Sheik Braddock returned to Dallas where he beat Chico Torres at the Sportatorium. He participated in the main event later that night by teaming with John Tatum, Gary Young and Chris Youngblood to defeat Torres, Jimmy Jack Funk, Dutch Mantell and Kevin Von Erich in an 8-man tag team match. Braddock then went back to Memphis where he and Chris Youngblood unsuccessfully challenged then USWA Tag Team Champions "The Southern Rockers" (Steve Doll & Rex King).

By early-1990, Braddock himself left the tag team division to become a singles wrestler and became one of many veteran brawlers to join manager Skandor Akbar's "heel" stable Devastation Inc. Braddock frequently teamed with "Stunning" Steve Austin during his feud against Chris Adams. They were occasionally joined by Jeff Gaylord in 6-man tag team matches which included a televised bout against Adams, Matt Borne and Eric Embry on March 16. In another high-profile matchup, the trio took on Dustin Rhodes, Jimmy Jack Funk & Chico Torres at the end of the month.

However, Braddock had less luck against Embry who beat him in a singles match on March 23. During the next three months, he would go on to have mixed success in the singles division with wins over Chico Torres but lost important matches to Kevin Von Erich, Jeff Jarrett and Billy Travis. In Memphis, Braddock had better luck managing a title shot against USWA Southern Champion "Superstar" Bill Dundee on June 10. He also formed a regular team with Jeff Gaylord, who were known as "The Wild Things", and challenged Rex King & Joey Maggs for the USWA Tag Team Championship on July 14. Later joined by manager Downtown Bruno, the tag team also faced Ben Jordan & Ken Raper, King Cobra & Big Red, and Kowabunga & Ken Wayne whom they fought to a double-countout at the Mid-South Coliseum on July 30. Braddock also racked up an impressive string of victories over Jeff Jarrett, Ben Jordan and Rex King during this time.

=== Global Wrestling Federation; retirement (1992-1993) ===
In mid-1992, he made a one-time appearance in the Global Wrestling Federation teaming with Khris Germany in a losing effort to Ebony Experience at the Dallas Sportatorium in Dallas, Texas on July 17, 1992. His last year in wrestling was spent in Big D. Pro Wrestling, where he wrestled as "Scotty The Body Braddock", and retired after the promotion closed at the end of the year.

Between 2003 and 2005, many of his matches would be aired by IWA Puerto Rico on its television series IWA Total Impact during its "classic matches" segments. In December 2008, Total Non-Stop Action sent out a mobile text message to subscribers hinting Braddock as one of several men, specifically a former "world champion" and tag team partner of Mick Foley, who would act as a cornerman for Kurt Angle in his upcoming match with Rhyno. Foley was to be the special guest referee. Braddock makes sporadic appearances in Texas for local indy shows.

== Championships and accomplishments ==
- Big D Wrestling
  - Big D Tag Team Championship (1 time) - with Ray Evans
- National Class Wrestling
  - NCW Heavyweight Championship (1 time)
- United States Wrestling Association
  - USWA Tag Team Championship (2 times) - with Cactus Jack (1) and Ron Starr (1)
- World Class Wrestling Association
  - WCWA World Tag Team Championship (1 time) - with Cactus Jack
