= Frankie Lancaster =

American retired professional wrestler (born 1960)

Personal information
- Born: Franklin E. Kirschner II; October 16, 1960 (age 66) Tampa, Florida, United States
- Spouse: Vanessa Kirschner (m. 2004)

Professional wrestling career
- Ring name(s): Frank Lancaster; Frankie Lancaster; Frank Lane; Frank Lang; Heartbreaker Adonis; Headhunter Adonis
- Billed height: 6 ft 1 in (185 cm)
- Billed weight: 239 lb (108 kg)
- Debut: 1982
- Retired: 2019

Franklin E. Kirschner II (born October 16, 1960) is an American retired professional wrestler, best known for his time with World Championship Wrestling (WCW), under the ring name Frankie Lancaster. He appeared with the company as a jobber between 1993 and 2000. He also appeared in the Southern territories, Puerto Rico, Japan and the World Wrestling Federation. He also is known for teaming with Wendell Cooley as the Heartbreakers.

== Professional wrestling career ==
Lancaster made his professional wrestling debut in 1982. Early in his career he worked for Mid-South Wrestling and Championship Wrestling from Florida.

In 1987, Lancaster would make his debut for World Wrestling Council in Puerto Rico where he became a two-time WWC World Junior Heavyweight Champion. The first time he defeated Invader III for the title. The title was vacated on April 18 when his match with Super Medic went to a draw. He had a rematch with Super Medic, defeating Medic to regain the title. Lancaster also had several tours in Japan working for All Japan Pro Wrestling.

Also in 1987 he became a two-time WCWA World Tag Team Champion in Texas with Eric Embry and Brian Adias.

Lancaster from 1988 to 1990 worked in Florida and Memphis.

In 1991, he formed a tag team with Wendell Cooley as the Heartbreakers in Puerto Rico with Cooley as Apollo and Lancaster as Adonis. They won the WWC World Tag Team Championship defeating El Bronco and Invader #1. The Heartbreakers won the title two more times feuding with Rex King and Ricky Santana. When Cooley left Puerto Rico, Lancaster won the titles for the fourth time with Doug Masters.

Lancaster worked for the World Wrestling Federation between 1991 and 1993. He and Cooley lost to The Bushwhackers on a taping for WWF Wrestling Challenge in 1992. He would return to WWF in 1995 losing to Razor Ramon on Monday Night Raw.

Lancaster made his debut for World Championship Wrestling in 1993 where he became a regular jobber on WCW's B-shows such as Saturday Night, WorldWide, Pro and Main Event. His only victories were over Mark Starr. During his time with the company against major stars including Lord Steven Regal, Ricky Steamboat, Dustin Rhodes, Randy Savage, Steve Austin, Brian Pillman, Meng, Goldberg, Alex Wright, Jim Duggan and David Flair. Lancaster left WCW in March 2000.

After Lancaster left WCW in 2000, he would reunite with Cooley as The Heartbreakers in the independent circuit and continued teaming up occasionally.

Later in his career, he continued working in the Florida and Southern promotions as well as a couple of tours in Puerto Rico until retiring in 2019.

== Personal life ==
Lancaster lives in Tampa, Florida with his wife Vanessa. He currently owns and operates his own Pest Control Company: Alec's Pest Control, named after his first-born grandson, Alec.

== Championships and accomplishments ==
- Pro Wrestling Illustrated
  - PWI ranked him # 328 of the 500 best singles wrestlers of the PWI 500 in 1991
  - PWI ranked him # 217 of the 500 best singles wrestlers of the PWI 500 in 1992
  - PWI ranked him # 256 of the 500 best singles wrestlers of the PWI 500 in 1993
- Texas All-Star Wrestling
  - Texas Tag Team Championship (1 time) – with Paul Diamond
- World Class Wrestling Association
  - WCWA World Tag Team Championship (2 times) – with Eric Embry (1) and Brian Adias (1)
- World Wrestling Council
  - WWC World Junior Heavyweight Championship (2 times)
  - WWC World Tag Team Championship (4 times) – with Wendell Cooley (3) and Doug Masters (1)
