= SuperClash III =

Major professional wrestling show

- The PPV logo used for the event
- Promotion: American Wrestling Association
- Date: December 13, 1988
- City: Chicago, Illinois
- Venue: UIC Pavilion
- Attendance: 1,672
- Buy rate: 45,000

SuperClash chronology
← Previous; SuperClash II	Next → SuperClash IV

SuperClash III was the third SuperClash professional wrestling event produced by the American Wrestling Association (AWA). The event was held on December 13, 1988, from the UIC Pavilion in Chicago. It was the only AWA show to be broadcast on pay-per-view (PPV). The Texas-based World Class Wrestling Association (WCWA; formerly known as World Class Championship Wrestling), women's wrestling promotion Powerful Women of Wrestling (POWW), and Memphis-based Championship Wrestling Association (CWA) also provided wrestlers for the show.

Twelve matches were contested at the event. The main event was a tag team match, in which The Rock 'n' Roll Express (Ricky Morton and Robert Gibson) fought The Stud Stable (Robert Fuller and Jimmy Golden) to a double disqualification. The penultimate match was the most important match of the event, in which the AWA World Heavyweight Champion Jerry Lawler defeated the WCWA World Heavyweight Champion Kerry Von Erich in a championship unification match to unify the WCWA World Heavyweight Championship into the AWA World Heavyweight Championship.

The show was poorly received, not a financial success and soon after the WCWA was bought out by Jerry Lawler and Jerry Jarrett and merged with the CWA to become the United States Wrestling Association (USWA). The show was added to the WWE Network in June 2016.

== Event ==
=== Preliminary matches ===
The opening match of the event was a six-man tag team match in which the Guerrero brothers Chavo Guerrero, Mando Guerrero and Hector Guerrero took on Cactus Jack and Rock 'n' Roll RPMs (Mike Davis and Tommy Lane). Chavo hit a moonsault to Lane for the win.

Next, Jeff Jarrett defended the WCWA World Light Heavyweight Championship against Eric Embry. The two reversed several pinfall attempts which ended with Embry pinning Jarrett to win the title.

Next, Jimmy Valiant took on Wayne Bloom. Bloom attacked Valiant from behind but Valiant quickly countered by hitting an elbow drop for the win.

Next, Iceman King Parsons defended the WCWA Texas Heavyweight Championship against Brickhouse Brown. Brown hit a flying bodypress to Parsons and covered him for the pinfall, assuming that he had won the title while Parsons had put his foot on the bottom rope. Parsons then grabbed a foreign object and hit Brown with it to retain the title.

The match was followed by a six-person mixed tag team match pitting The Top Guns (Ricky Rice and Derrick Dukes) and Wendi Richter against Badd Company (Paul Diamond and Pat Tanaka) and Madusa Miceli, where Badd Company's World Tag Team Championship and Richter's World Women's Championship were on the line. Near the end of the match, Madusa held Richter while Tanaka tried to hit a savate kick but Richter ducked and Madusa was accidentally hit with it, allowing Richter to pin Madusa to retain her title. Stipulations for the match said that both the women's title and tag title were on the line but only changed hands depending on who pinned whom. Therefore, Badd Company retained their tag team championship.

Next, Greg Gagne took on Ron Garvin for the vacant International Television Championship. The action spilled to the outside of the ring until Gagne went back to the ring before the ten count to win the match and the vacant title.

The following match was a Lingerie Battle Royal. Syrian Terrorist won the match.

Next, Sgt. Slaughter took on Colonel DeBeers in a Boot Camp match. Slaughter put on a helmet and hit DeBeers with it and applied a cobra clutch for the win. After the match, The Iron Sheik and Shiek Adnan Al-Kaissey attacked Slaughter until the Guerreros made the save.

Next, The Samoan Swat Team (Samu and Fatu) defended the WCWA World Tag Team Championship against Michael Hayes and Steve Cox. A brawl broke out between Samu and Fox and several referees tried to break it, allowing Buddy Roberts to hit Hayes with his wallet and Fatu then pinned Hayes to retain the titles.

Later, Wahoo McDaniel took on Manny Fernandez in an Indian Strap match. McDaniel touched all four corners to win the match. Fernandez attacked McDaniel after the match until Tatsumi Fujinami made the save.

=== Main event matches ===
The title unification match was the major highlight of the event, in which Jerry Lawler's AWA World Heavyweight Championship and Kerry Von Erich's WCWA World Heavyweight Championship were on the line and the match would result in the WCWA title being unified into the AWA title. Near the end of the match, Von Erich applied an Iron Claw on Lawler but the referee stopped the match due to Von Erich's excessive bleeding, rendering him unable to continue and awarding the victory to Lawler, making him the undisputed world champion.

The main event of SuperClash III was a tag team match in which The Rock 'n' Roll Express (Ricky Morton and Robert Gibson) took on Robert Fuller and Jimmy Golden. Near the end of the match, Morton and Gibson hit a double dropkick to Golden and attempted to cover him for the pinfall but Fuller interfered and both teams brawled in the ring, leading the referee to disqualify both teams.

== Reception ==
SuperClash III was very poorly received as the event was not a financial success and Verne Gagne did not pay the visiting talent the agreed amount for their participation, due to low buyrates. Many professional wrestling experts have considered the event to be the downfall of AWA as people refused to work for Gagne after his failure to pay the wrestlers. The most notable criticism came from the AWA World Heavyweight Champion Jerry Lawler, who was not paid for his participation in the event and Gagne ultimately stripped him of the title and buried him on AWA television.

== Results ==
No.	Results	Stipulations	Times
1	Chavo Guerrero, Mando Guerrero, and Hector Guerrero defeated Cactus Jack and The Rock 'n' Roll RPMs (Mike Davis and Tommy Lane)	Six-man tag team match	06:35
2	Eric Embry defeated Jeff Jarrett (c)	Singles match for the WCWA World Light Heavyweight Championship	04:13
3	Jimmy Valiant defeated Wayne Bloom	Singles match	00:24
4	Iceman King Parsons (c) defeated Brickhouse Brown	Singles match for the WCWA Texas Heavyweight Championship	05:41
5	Wendi Richter (Women's) and The Top Guns (Ricky Rice and Derrick Dukes) defeated Badd Company (Paul Diamond and Pat Tanaka) (Tag Team) and Madusa Miceli (with Diamond Dallas Page)	Mixed tag team match for the AWA World Women's and the AWA World Tag Team Championships	05:43
6	Greg Gagne defeated Ron Garvin by count-out	Singles match for the vacant AWA International Television Championship	05:52
7	The Syrian Terrorist defeated Bambi, Peggy Lee Leather, Laurie Lynn, Brandi Mae, Malibu, Nina, Pocohantas and Luna Vachon	Street Fight Lingerie Battle Royal	08:36
8	Sgt. Slaughter defeated Colonel DeBeers (with Diamond Dallas Page)	Boot Camp match	05:45
9	The Samoan Swat Team (Samu and Fatu) (with Buddy Roberts) (c) defeated Michael Hayes and Steve Cox	Tag team match for the WCWA World Tag Team Championship	07:53
10	Wahoo McDaniel defeated Manny Fernandez	Indian Strap match	07:48
11	Jerry Lawler (AWA) defeated Kerry Von Erich (WCWA) due to referee stoppage	Title Unification match for the AWA and WCWA World Heavyweight Championships	18:53
12	The Rock 'n' Roll Express (Ricky Morton and Robert Gibson) vs. Stud Stable (Robert Fuller and Jimmy Golden) (with Miss Sylvia) ended in a double disqualification	Tag team match	07:03
(c) / – the champion(s) heading into the match
