= Shaun Simpson =

Shaun Simpson may refer to:

- Shaun Simpson (motorcyclist)
- Shaun Simpson (wrestler)

== See also ==
- Shawn Simpson, Canadian ice hockey player
