= Gary Young (wrestler) =

American retired professional wrestler (born 1959)

Personal information
- Born: David Harrington; August 26, 1959 (age 66) Houston, Texas, U.S.

Professional wrestling career
- Ring name(s): Gary Young; Gorgeous Gary Young; Super Zodiac; Texas Ranger; Gary Harrington; Gary Starr
- Billed height: 6"2
- Billed weight: 250 lb (110 kg)
- Billed from: Little Rock, Arkansas
- Trained by: Joe Pizza
- Debut: 1977
- Retired: 1998

David Harrington is an American retired professional wrestler under the ring name Gary Young. Best known for his time with World Class Championship Wrestling, Continental Wrestling Association, UWF Mid-South, United States Wrestling Association, and Global Wrestling Federation. He also worked in other Texas promotions.

== Early life ==
Young went to high school with Gino Hernandez, who later teamed together.

== Professional wrestling career ==
Young made his professional wrestling debut in 1977 in St. Louis. In 1980, Young made his debut for World Class Championship Wrestling and won the NWA American Tag Team Championship with his fellow schoolmate Gino Hernandez.

In 1986, Young made his debut for Bill Watts' UWF Mid-South.

In 1988, he made his debut in Memphis for Continental Wrestling Association as part of the Stud Stable. He won the CWA Tag Team Championship four times. Twice with Maxx Payne, once with Don Bass, and once with Cactus Jack. He and Jack lost in a loser leaves town match to Jimmy Golden and Robert Fuller.

Also in 1988, Young returned to World Class and won the NWA American Heavyweight Championship in March 1989 defeating Brickhouse Brown. A month later he dropped the title to Eric Embry. Young disguised himself as the Super Zodiac defeating Embry for the title on May 19, 1989, but a week later dropped it back to Embry. World Class would become United States Wrestling Association and move to Memphis. Young would stay with USWA until 1991.

In 1991, a new promotion in Texas called Global Wrestling Federation started up and Young made his debut there. He worked with GWF until the promotion folded in September 1994.

Young wrestled in independent Texas promotions until retiring in 1998.

== Personal life ==
Young manages a Chili's restaurant in Little Rock, Arkansas.

== Championships and accomplishments ==
- Continental Wrestling Association
  - CWA Tag Team Championship (4 times) – with Maxx Payne (2), Don Bass (wrestler) (3), and Cactus Jack (1)
- Global Wrestling Federation
  - GWF Tag Team Championship (1 time) – with Steven Dane
- United States Wrestling Association
  - USWA Texas Heavyweight Championship (2 times)
- Western States Sports
  - NWA Western States Tag Team Championship (2 times) – with Pete Sanchez
- NWA Big Time Wrestling / World Class Championship Wrestling
  - NWA American Tag Team Championship (1 time) – with Gino Hernandez (1)
- Pro Wrestling Illustrated
  - PWI ranked him # 81 of the 500 best singles wrestlers of the PWI 500 in 1991
  - PWI ranked him # 89 of the 500 best singles wrestlers of the PWI 500 in 1992
  - PWI ranked him # 169 of the 500 best singles wrestlers of the PWI 500 in 1993
