= WCWA World Light Heavyweight Championship =

- The championship belt

Details
- Promotion: World Class Wrestling Association
- Date established: 1987
- Date retired: 1989
Statistics
- First champion: Eric Embry
- Most reigns: Eric Embry (5 reigns)
- Longest reign: Eric Embry (295 days)
- Shortest reign: Cactus Jack (5 days)
- Oldest champion: Eric Embry (29 years, 311 days) (Note: Wrestler's age when they won the championship: Cactus Jack - 23 years, 206 days; Eric Embry - First reign: 28 years, 197 days, last reign: 29 years, 311 days; Jeff Jarrett - first reign: 21 years, 93 days, second reign 21 years, 133 days; Shaun Simpson - 21 years, 126 days)
- Youngest champion: Jeff Jarrett (21 years, 93 days)

The WCWA Light Heavyweight Championship was a professional wrestling championship promoted by the Dallas–Fort Worth metroplex area-based World Class Wrestling Association (WCWA) promotion from September 13, 1987 until May 1989. The championship was for wrestlers under 230 pounds (100 kg) pounds, the maximum limit of the "Light Heavyweight" division at the time. As it is a professional wrestling championship, it is won not by actual competition, but by a scripted ending to a match. (Note: Hornbaker (2016) p. 550: "Professional wrestling is a sport in which match finishes are predetermined. Thus, win–loss records are not indicative of a wrestler's genuine success based on their legitimate abilities – but on now much, or how little they were pushed by promoters")

According to WCWA, inaugural champion Eric Embry won the championship by defeating Peter Vander Graling (or "Vandergraling") on a show in South Africa on September 13, 1987, however no sources have confirmed the validity of the claim, leading to the belief that this was simply a storyline by WCWA to explain how Embry became champion. Embry won WCWA Texas Heavyweight Championship on April 7, 1989, followed by the WCWA World Light Heavyweight Championship being declared vacant in May, after which it was never promoted again. Embry holds the record for most championship reigns, with five in total, the longest individual reign (295 days) and the longest combined reigns (approximately 518 days). Cactus Jack's five day reign, from December 30, 1988 to January 4, 1989, is the shortest reign of any champion.

== Title history ==
Key
No.	Overall reign number
Reign	Reign number for the specific champion
Days	Number of days held

No.	Champion	Championship change			Reign statistics		Notes	Ref.
No.	Champion	Date	Event	Location	Reign	Days	Notes	Ref.
1	Eric Embry	September 13, 1987	Live event	South Africa	1	73	Supposedly defeated Peter Vander Graling, posibibly a fictitious match	
2	Shaun Simpson	November 25, 1987	WCWA Live event	Dallas, Texas	1	30		
3	Eric Embry	December 25, 1987	Christmas Star Wars	Dallas, Texas	2	295		
4	Jeff Jarrett	October 15, 1988	5th Cotton Bowl Extravaganza	Dallas, Texas	1	27	Highlights aired on the October 22 episode of WCCW's weekly television show (E356)	
5	Eric Embry	November 11, 1988	WCWA Live event	Dallas, Texas	3	13		
6	Jeff Jarrett	November 24, 1988	WCWA Live event	Jackson, Tennessee	2	19		
7	Eric Embry	December 13, 1988	SuperClash III	Chicago, Illinois	4	17		
8	Cactus Jack	December 30, 1988	WCWA Live event	Dallas, Texas	1	5		
9	Eric Embry	January 4, 1989	WCWA Live event	Dallas, Texas	5	93		
—	Deactivated	April 7, 1989	—	—	—	—	WCCW Light Heavyweight Championship unified with the Texas Championship.	

== Reigns by combined length ==
Rank	Wrestler	No. of reigns	Combined days
1	Eric Embry	5	491
2	Jeff Jarrett	2	46
3	Shaun Simpson	1	30
4	Cactus Jack	1	5
