= Shaun Simpson (wrestler) =

South African professional wrestler

Personal information
- Born: July 22, 1966 (age 60) Johannesburg, South Africa

Professional wrestling career
- Ring name: Shaun Simpson
- Billed weight: 200 lb (91 kg)
- Trained by: Sammy Cohen
- Debut: 1986
- Retired: 1998

Shaun Simpson (born July 22, 1966) is a retired professional wrestler from South Africa.

== Career ==
Shaun Simpson is the son of professional wrestler Alec Simpson, who wrestled as Sammy Cohen. Shaun made his debut in 1987 for World Class Championship Wrestling. He formed a tag team with his brother, Steve Simpson, subsequently winning the WCWA World Tag Team titles. Their biggest feud was against John Tatum and Jack Victory.

In World Class, the Simpsons were allied (in storylines) with the Von Erich family, and were fan favorites in the territory.

He left WCCW with his brother in late 1989 to wrestle in South Africa but Steve Simpson returned in 1991 to wrestle in Global Wrestling Federation in Texas.

== Championships and accomplishments ==
- Pro Wrestling Illustrated
  - PWI ranked him #376 of the top 500 singles wrestlers in the PWI 500 in 1992
  - PWI ranked him #341 of the top 500 singles wrestlers in the PWI 500 in 1991
- Texas Wrestling Federation

- TWF Light-Heavyweight Championship (1 time)

- Wild West Wrestling

- Wild West Tag Team Championship (2 times) - with Steve Simpson

- World Class Championship Wrestling / World Class Wrestling Association

- WCWA Texas Tag Team Championship (3 times) - with Steve Simpson
- WCWA World Light Heavyweight Championship (1 time)
- WCWA World Tag Team Championship (1 time) - with Steve Simpson
