= World Class Championship Wrestling =

American professional wrestling promotion

- The World Class Championship Wrestling logo. It depicts Kevin Von Erich putting the Iron Claw on Genichiro Tenryu
- Acronym: WCCW
- Founded: 1966
- Defunct: 1990
- Style: American wrestling
- Headquarters: Dallas-Fort Worth, Texas, U.S.
- Founder: Ed McLemore
- Owner(s): Fritz Von Erich (1966–1988); Jerry Jarrett, Kerry, and Kevin Von Erich (1988–1990)
- Parent: Southwest Sports, Inc. (1966–1988); Jarrett Promotions (1988–1990)
- Formerly: NWA Big Time Wrestling (1966-1982); World Class Championship Wrestling (1982–1986); World Class Wrestling Association (1986–1990)
- Merged with: Continental Wrestling Association
- Successor: Initial: United States Wrestling Association; International World Class Championship Wrestling; Later: World Class II; World Class Revolution

World Class Championship Wrestling (WCCW), later known as the World Class Wrestling Association (WCWA), was an American professional wrestling promotion headquartered in Dallas and Fort Worth, Texas. Originally owned by promoter Ed McLemore, by 1966 it was run by Southwest Sports, Inc., whose president, Jack Adkisson, was better known as wrestler Fritz Von Erich. Beginning as a territory of the National Wrestling Alliance (NWA), it went independent in 1986 in a bid to become a major national promotion, but was unsuccessful in its attempts and eventually went out of business in 1990. Rights to the pre-1989 WCCW tape library belong to WWE (the post-1988 rights are owned by International World Class Championship Wrestling) and select episodes from 1982 to 1988 were formerly available on the WWE Network before it was shut down on April 1, 2026.

World Class Championship Wrestling experienced tremendous success from 1981 to 1985, shattering attendance records and achieving global exposure through their syndicated television program. Bookers Ken Mantell, David Von Erich, Gary Hart, Bruiser Brody and Kevin Von Erich provided fans with hard hitting action centered on the popular Von Erich brothers and a cast of devious villains. Storylines during this time followed a consistent theme of friendship and betrayal, with many of the top villains being first presented as friends to the Von Erich Family, only to betray them months or even years later. Talent deals and exchanges helped WCCW bring in future stars such as Chris Adams, The Fabulous Freebirds, Jake Roberts, Mick Foley, a young Shawn Michaels, Gino Hernandez and Iceman King Parsons, and others.

World Class Championship Wrestling was a member of the NWA and was originally known as Big Time Wrestling until 1982, when Adkisson decided that the name of his federation needed to be changed. Mickey Grant, who headed the production of its telecasts (known as Texas Championship Wrestling), suggested the name World Class. WCCW operated its enterprise in Dallas, Texas and held wrestling events at the Reunion Arena, and mostly at the famed Sportatorium, located just south of Downtown Dallas, which was also a well-known boxing and wrestling arena as well as the one-time home to the famous Big D Jamboree.

== History ==
=== Big Time Wrestling (1966–1981) ===
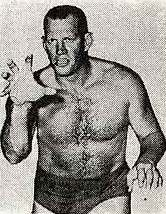
WCCW promoter Fritz Von Erich

WCCW was originally known as Big Time Wrestling and, until the late 1970s, was dominated by its owner, Fritz Von Erich. In 1966, Von Erich and Ed McLemore-owner of the Dallas Sportatorium- bought out the Dallas/Fort Worth Wrestling Office, breaking away from Houston Wrestling Office, which was managed by Paul Boesch. In 1969, Von Erich took sole control over the Office after McLemore died from a heart attack, and also gained ownership of the Dallas Sportatorium. Initially playing his longtime role of a snarling, goose-stepping Nazi monster heel and sometimes teaming with "brother" Waldo, Fritz turned babyface in late 1966 and began feuding with Gary Hart and his stable of wrestlers (which at this time included Karl Von Brauner, Al Costello and the masked Spoilers); the feud between Hart and Fritz (and his sons) would continue off and on for more than two decades. Fritz's other classic rivalries during this early period were with such stars as Johnny Valentine, Stan Stasiak, Professor Toru Tanaka, Lord Alfred Hayes, The Sheik, Bruiser Brody and The Great Kabuki. Babyface wrestlers playing secondary roles in the promotion at various times included Wahoo McDaniel, Pepper Gomez, Red Bastien, Jose Lothario and Lonnie "Moondog" Mayne. Many of these wrestlers were regular mainstays of the Grand Olympic Auditorium wrestling promotion in Los Angeles, who would compete in Dallas regularly, as did Fritz and several Texas-based wrestlers doing the same for Gene and Mike LeBell's promotion in L.A.

As his sons began to launch wrestling careers of their own in the mid-to-late 1970s, Fritz gradually cut back on his in-ring appearances and concentrated on promoting, finally retiring from the ring altogether after a 1982 NWA American Title win over King Kong Bundy at Texas Stadium in Irving. By then, the promotion had switched to the World Class name and was centered on Fritz's sons, Kevin, David, Kerry, and later, Mike Von Erich.

=== Boom years (1982–1986) ===
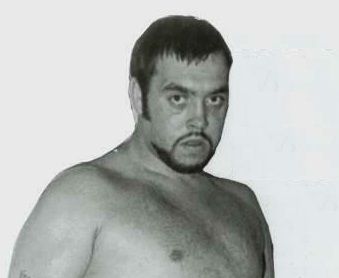
Gary Hart served as a booker and on-screen manager for the promotion

Developed and booked by manager and behind-the-scenes booker Gary Hart, World Class' most storied feud was the legendary and long-running battle between the Von Erichs and the Freebirds, which began on December 25, 1982, during an NWA World title match between Kerry Von Erich and champion Ric Flair at Reunion Arena in Dallas. After several of Flair's title defenses against Kerry ended in controversy with the champion retaining the belt by various illegal means (including an earlier match which involved a corrupt referee, Alfred Neely), the promotion had finally booked a rematch between the two in a steel cage to prevent any interference, and announced a write-in poll in which fans could vote for the wrestler they wanted to serve as special referee for the match. Freebird Michael Hayes, whose popularity in WCCW at that point was second only to the Von Erichs themselves, was selected to officiate, and his tag team partner Terry Gordy was at ringside to guard the cage door. However, when Kerry refused to pin Flair following unwanted interference on his behalf by Hayes, the Freebirds turned on Von Erich, with Gordy slamming the door on Kerry's head. Backup referee David Manning banished Hayes and Gordy to the dressing room, and the match ended shortly thereafter, with Flair retaining the title yet again as Manning stopped the match due to Kerry's inability to continue the match. Shortly after, Gary Hart left WCCW, due to money issues with Von Erich; the Freebirds wanted to follow suit, but Hart persuaded them to stay in WCCW. A year later, Gordy would have his head slammed by the cage door from Fritz Von Erich, in retaliation.

The Freebird-Von Erich rivalry was one of the most violent feuds in modern-day wrestling history and continued off-and-on for much of the decade; Parsons, Adams, "Gorgeous" Jimmy Garvin and members of Skandor Akbar's Devastation Inc. stable were also involved in the Freebird-Von Erich feud directly or indirectly during the course of the angle. The official last match between the Freebirds and the Von Erichs took place in April 1993 in Dallas.

==== 1983 ====
Buddy Roberts was involved in several conflicts in 1983 with "Iceman" King Parsons, including a match in which Roberts lost his hair in a hair vs hair match despite winning the match. Parsons, who lost the match, managed to grab the infamous Freebird Hair Cream (used as a plot device in earlier matches as a fictional hair remover) and rub the contents onto Roberts' head. This prompted Roberts to wear a wig and headgear to cover his bald head, whose hair grew back in a time span of six months.

A secondary feud was born between Jimmy Garvin, who had spent much of 1983 feuding with David Von Erich, against England's Chris Adams. Adams faced Garvin for the first time on August 26, 1983, at the Dallas Sportatorium, both wrestling to a time-limit draw. Afterwards, both Garvin and Adams exchanged insults, calling each other a coward, with Adams challenging Garvin to a title match on October 7, as Garvin was about to face David Von Erich (which proved to be the last-ever match between Garvin and Von Erich). The angle reached new heights on October 21 when Adams disguised himself as The Masked Avenger and faced Garvin. Playing possum, Adams surprised Garvin with some wrestling moves, and then as he threw Garvin to the ropes, Chris superkicked him, which stunned the Sportatorium crowd and announcer Bill Mercer who said '"a thrust kick...HEY that looks like...here it is; 1, 2, 3; a superkick". Afterwards, he unmasked to reveal himself as Chris Adams, which proved to be a turning point in Adams' tenure in World Class; elevating him from mid-card to main-event status. Sunshine, who used to be Garvin's valet, joined Adams' side two weeks later, and with Sunshine in his corner, Adams defeated Garvin for the American title on November 24 at Reunion Arena; the first of five NWA American/World Class heavyweight title reigns for the British star. Adams and Garvin traded the American title on numerous occasions and engaged in mixed tag team matches involving Sunshine and Precious. It was said to be among the first mixed tag-team matches in modern wrestling history and would pave the way for future mixed tag team matches, including one Adams promoted himself six years later involving two of his ex-wives (Jeanie Clark and Toni Adams) and his protégé Steve Austin.

==== 1984 ====
On February 10, 1984, at the height of the Von Erich-Freebird wars, David Von Erich died from an intestinal rupture caused by a stomach ailment just after arriving in Japan for a tour for All Japan Pro Wrestling. Although Ric Flair asserted in his autobiography that most people in wrestling believe David died of a drug overdose, with Bruiser Brody flushing pills down a hotel toilet before the police arrived, David's autopsy report indicated no drugs in his system and that his death was definitely caused by acute enteritis. His death was front-page news in the Dallas-Fort Worth Metroplex, triggering an area-wide outpouring of shock and grief among fans, and was the beginning of the Von Erichs' decline and fall (and WCCW's as well, although attendance levels would remain high for a time).

His death prompted a few changes in upcoming events. The February 10 non-televised card at the Dallas Sportatorium was to have Kamala, The Missing Link and Jimmy Garvin face Chris Adams and Kevin and Kerry Von Erich in the main event. Instead, Brian Adias and King Parsons took Kevin and Kerry's places, and the trio of Adams, Parsons and Adias defeated Kamala, Link and Garvin in an emotional match for all involved. The February 13 card, featured Marc Lowrance and David Manning in the ring alongside Sunshine, Adams, Parsons, Adias, Junkyard Dog, Chief Jules Strongbow, Jimmy Phillips, Bronko Lubich and Johnny Mantell as a ten-bell salute to honor David Von Erich was carried out. David's funeral took place two days later, and an estimated 5,000 people paid tribute to the fallen star; one of the largest funeral gatherings to take place in the Metroplex at the time.

A March 3, 1984 telecast of World Class Championship Wrestling was dedicated exclusively to the life of David Von Erich, with wrestlers Michael Hayes, Jimmy Garvin, Harley Race, Chris Adams and Ric Flair paying tribute to the fallen hero. Bill Mercer and Mickey Grant also provided footage of David's earlier times as a high school basketball standout and had an interview with Fritz, Kevin and Kerry during the broadcast. The Von Erichs, who took David's death extremely hard, did not compete again until February 27, when they teamed with Adams to defeat Butch Reed, Jimmy Garvin, Michael Hayes and Terry Gordy. David had been seen by many in the NWA as potential World Championship material. According to Ric Flair, David had indeed been chosen by the NWA to become the World Heavyweight Champion and Flair also stated in his autobiography To Be The Man that had David lived, he would have had the potential to be a long-term NWA Champion.

On May 6, 1984, as a tribute to his late brother, Kerry Von Erich finally defeated Ric Flair after a hard-fought 14-minute battle to win the title at the first annual David Von Erich Memorial Parade of Champions supercard held at Texas Stadium in Irving. However, because Kerry already had a reputation within the industry for being unreliable due to substance abuse, the NWA only allowed him a brief title reign; he lost the belt back to Flair in Yokosuka, Japan on May 24 (May 23 in the U.S.) in another hard-fought match. The match, which did not air on television initially, allowed World Class to use an angle in which Flair cheated in the match, and claimed the referee was a sumo official who did not understand the rules of pro wrestling. The match, which Flair won with a clean pinfall over Kerry, in fact was officiated by veteran All Japan Pro Wrestling referee Joe Higuchi, who found David Von Erich's body the previous February, and was also the one who alerted David Manning of his death.

Afterwards, the Freebirds left World Class in the summer of 1984, and, except for a few appearances, did not return full-time until December 1985. Jimmy Garvin and Precious also departed WCCW during this time to join the AWA. An unusual three-way feud ensued during the summer of 1984 involving Killer Khan, originally brought in by the Freebirds in their quest to destroy the Von Erichs, fighting the Freebirds and Von Erichs after Khan was bought by General Skandor Akbar. During one match at the Sportatorium, Michael Hayes and Kevin Von Erich took turns attacking Khan, shoving each other away in the process.

One of the top angles of the summer of 1984 was a mixed feud between Gino Hernandez and Nickla Roberts (aka Baby Doll, billed as Andrea The Lady Giant) against Mike Von Erich and Stella Mae French. The angle reached new heights in the fall of 1984 when Sunshine, arriving on a helicopter at the Cotton Bowl, interfered in a match, allowing French to pin Roberts. This angle, which also involved Chris Adams, ended in 1985.

With The Freebirds out of the picture and attempting other angles that proved to be not as highly successful as the Freebirds-Von Erichs wars, World Class decided to turn Chris Adams heel and start a long and legendary war which lasted for over a year, and at the same time, drawing revenues that exceeded the Freebirds-Von Erichs angle. The new angle was developed by Ken Mantell, Gary Hart, Chris Adams and Fritz Von Erich, which was born out of a conversation between Adams and Hart, where Adams wanted to change his image and try his luck as a heel wrestler.

Gary Hart, who left World Class in early-1983 due to a dispute with Fritz Von Erich over the booking of the Freebirds-Von Erich feud, returned to World Class in August to scout the babyface talent, including Adams, Iceman King Parsons, Brian Adias and others. Towards the end of the month, Adams, who had returned from his tenure in Los Angeles during the 1984 Summer Olympics, announced his alliance with Hart, which resulted in some friction between Adams and the babyfaces.

On September 28, 1984, Adams was paired with Kevin Von Erich against Jake Roberts and Gino Hernandez, with Gary Hart and Stella Mae French in Adams and Von Erich's corner. As the match wound down, Hernandez had Adams in a high vertical suplex, with French tripping Hernandez, causing Adams to land on Gino; however he rolled over on top of Chris and pinned him. After the match, an enraged Adams began arguing with French, with Hart and Kevin coming in as peacemakers. Hart later abused Stella Mae, prompting Kevin to shove him to the corner of the heels' side of the ring. Out of nowhere, Adams blasted Kevin with a superkick, which prompted Hernandez and Roberts to throw French out of the ring and attack Kevin, while Adams and Hart walked away. The two-on-one gang-up continued (which included Roberts' patented DDT) until Buck Zumhofe and David Manning ran in to chase Roberts and Hernandez away.

The following Monday in Fort Worth on October 1, 1984; Adams was selected as the mystery partner in a six-man tag match for Hernandez and Roberts in a match against Kerry and Mike Von Erich, with Buck Zumhofe subbing for Kevin. As Adams gave Mike a backdrop from the canvas using his legs, Kevin stormed the ring and attacked Adams, resulting in a brawl between the former friends and tag partners until David Manning, Bronco Lubich, Rick Hazzard and Gary Hart separated the two.

On October 27, Adams and Von Erich squared off at the Cotton Bowl, with Kevin winning the match, amid controversy when Adams lifted his shoulder at the count of one, but referee David Manning counted to three with Adams lifting his shoulder again, believing he was at the count of two. Afterwards, Kevin made a deal with Chris: leave Gary Hart and go on his own and all would be forgiven. Adams responded by attacking Kevin with a chair. Unintentionally, Adams hit Kevin in the head hard enough for the chair to break in half, causing Kevin some bleeding from the head and resulting in his hospitalization for a few days. The Adams-Von Erich feud had been set up in this way because Fritz Von Erich felt that too many fans were siding with Adams, and after the Cotton Bowl incident, Adams still heard cheers from some of the fans. A month later, Kevin returned the favor by smashing a chair into Adams' head after losing to him, and that resulted in Chris being helped out of the arena with a minor concussion and nearly losing his left eye when a piece of the wooden chair lodged onto his nose after the chair shot, very dangerously close to his eye. The wooden chair angle was quickly scrapped at Kevin and Chris' requests due to the legitimate injuries both wrestlers sustained. Adams eventually became World Class' biggest heel; yet at the same time, as the feud with the Von Erichs progressed, he began facing other heels, such as Ric Flair and members of Skandor Akbar's army.

By 1985, Adams began tagging with Hernandez, forming the second and most successful version of The Dynamic Duo (Tully Blanchard and Hernandez formed the original version). Towards the end of the year, Adams and Hernandez used scissors (a gimmick that Brutus Beefcake would use later on in the WWF) to cut hair off opponents after each of their matches, and this resulted in a Cotton Bowl showdown in October 1985, in which Kevin and Kerry Von Erich defeated Adams and Hernandez in a losers-lose-hair match. Adams and Hernandez eventually broke up and began feuding, and faced each other in a January 1986 match where the loser would have his hair removed with Freebird Hair Cream (a gimmick used in a June 1983 match between Iceman Parsons and Freebird Buddy Roberts). Adams had the match won, but picked Hernandez up twice to dish out more punishment, and while he was arguing with the referee, Hernandez grabbed the hair cream and threw the contents in Adams' face, thus "blinding" him. Adams won the match by DQ as a result. However, by the time this angle aired on television a few days later, Hernandez was dead; his death, which was revealed by an autopsy to be the result of a cocaine overdose, ended any prospects of a hot feud between the former partners. The Scotland Yard questioned Adams regarding Hernandez's death, but no charges were ever filed against him. The original plan for the Adams-Hernandez feud was for Chris to return to face Hernandez at the Texas Stadium card after Adams' tour of Japan and visiting relatives in England, and stretch the feud out through much of 1986 which also involved mixed tag team matches.

==== 1985 ====
A brief yet high-profile angle between Chris Adams and Great Kabuki was played out during the summer of 1985 over which wrestler had the most lethal kick: Chris Adams and his superkick or Kabuki and his thrust kick. The angle was born in the spring of 1985 when manager Sunshine brought Kabuki in to battle Adams and Gino Hernandez. Both wrestlers displayed their martial arts talent in their matches, and during one singles match at the Dallas Sportatorium, half of the crowd was chanting for Adams, while the other half was chanting for Kabuki. Both Adams and Kabuki would have sporadic matches, both singles and tag team, through 1986.

In 1985, World Class went on a major tour to the Middle East (including Israel). The tour, which ran from August 3 through August 7, was held mostly in Tel Aviv, and proved to be extremely successful, but was also the start of another tragic episode for the Adkisson family, as it was during this tour that Mike Von Erich suffered a separated shoulder (in a tag team match with Kevin against Gino Hernandez and Chris Adams) that led to his near-fatal bout with toxic shock syndrome following surgery. In an ill-advised desperation move that would later infamously backfire, Fritz brought in Pacific Northwest Wrestling Champion, Ricky Vaughn, as "cousin" Lance Von Erich to fill the gap while Mike was recovering. Fritz billed Lance as the "son" of Waldo Von Erich, with whom Fritz tagged years earlier, but was not related to Fritz in any way. Vaughn made his WCCW debut at the 1985 Cotton Bowl event. To this day, it was considered to be the worst idea that Fritz came up with. The main participants on the Israel tour included Kevin and Mike Von Erich, Chris Adams, Gino Hernandez, Iceman King Parsons, Freebird Buddy Roberts, Scott Casey, Brian Adias, Rip Oliver, Kelly Kiniski and Johnny Mantell.

=== Independence from the NWA (1986–1988) ===
On February 4, 1986, local authorities and friends of Gino Hernandez - now one of the company's major stars - discovered him dead in his apartment. In addition, the NWA President at the time, Jim Crockett, Jr., had also decided that he would no longer book the NWA World Champion at the time, Ric Flair, to wrestle in the state of Texas. World Class, still reeling over the death of Gino Hernandez, withdrew its membership from the NWA on February 18, 1986, became known as the World Class Wrestling Association, yet they retained the "World Class Championship Wrestling" name for its broadcasts and matches after the 1985 Cotton Bowl event were sanctioned by the World Class Wrestling Association. The NWA American Heavyweight Championship, which had been the promotion's top championship for nearly 20 years, was immediately renamed and declared it to be their "World" title and Rick Rude, the holder of the American Heavyweight Championship, was recognized as the promotion's first World champion. While there is no official means of granting a championship "World" title status in professional wrestling, Pro Wrestling Illustrated didn't recognize the championship's status as a "World" title as it had with the American Wrestling Association (AWA), NWA, and World Wrestling Federation (WWF) championships. It was rumored that the NWA didn't want to give Kerry the title back, and the NWA didn't recognize the faster pace of the sport. The new corporation also gained a deal with ESPN to air a weekly show on the network as well. As a result of the NWA withdrawal, the WCWA also introduced a title-change rule in which a champion could lose the belt on a disqualification or a countout, much to the dismay of heel wrestlers, who opt to DQ themselves to keep the championship (most notably Ric Flair). That rule had been in place during the 1984 NWA World Heavyweight Championship match between Flair and Kerry Von Erich, and had been used sporadically before World Class seceded from the NWA, including its TV championship.

The Freebirds-Von Erich war reignited in late 1985, with Hayes, Gordy and Roberts against Kevin, Kerry and Lance Von Erich; reborn following a surprise gang-up on Kevin and Kerry during a match in Fort Worth, with announcer Marc Lowrance exclaiming that The Devil has emerged when returning from the commercial break. John Tatum and Missy Hyatt entered the promotion, and started a feud with The Fantastics and Sunshine. Chris Adams returned in April to do two house shows, and in May received a huge ovation from the crowd at Texas Stadium in his first televised match since the "blinding" angle. Chris did begin an angle with Rick Rude; but not before becoming a full-fledged face. However, when the WCWA was formed Fritz von Erich refused to book his shows outside of Dallas. This move led to a disputes with Fritz von Erich and the company's head booker Ken Mantell, who soon left the WCWA to become the head booker for the newly formed Universal Wrestling Federation(UWF); Referee David Manning took Mantell's place. After Mantell's departure in May 1986, attendance for WCWA shows began to drop greatly; along with Mantell, the new UWF was able to lure away more WCWA talent as well.

During a May 26, 1986 six-man tag match at Will Rogers Coliseum in Fort Worth, Adams was paired with Lance and Kevin Von Erich against Rick Rude, Kabuki and the One Man Gang. It was the first time since September 30, 1984 that Adams (substituting for the injured Bruiser Brody) was partnered with a Von Erich in any tag team match, and there was still some tension between Kevin and Chris in the early-going, but that eventually changed as the match progressed. As the match wound down, the One Man Gang was about to launch a major assault on Kevin with a chain, as Kevin was recovering from a double clothesline by OMG and Rude. As referee Rick Hazzard was trying to separate Rude and Lance, Adams entered the ring and superkicked OMG, then rolled Kevin on top of him and alerted Hazzard of the winning pinfall. After the match, with Chris, Lance and Kevin standing in the center of the ring, Kevin extended his hand, and Chris shook it and the two embraced in the center of the ring, signaling the end of World Class Championship Wrestling's most storied feud. Adams also feuded with Tatum and Hyatt, with Sunshine once again managing Chris, and also began wrestling against Matt Borne and Buzz Sawyer.

Chris evidently continued wrestling against Rude on several occasions, and in one match after a Rude Awakening neckbreaker, Chris "regained his eyesight." With the patch gone, Chris became the number one contender to Rude's World Class heavyweight title, and on July 4, 1986, he won it after a hard-fought and bloody battle at Reunion Arena in Dallas. Adams won with a small package when interference from Rude's manager Percy Pringle backfired. Over the course of the next three months, Chris defended the title almost every week, against challengers like Rude, Kabuki, One Man Gang, Blackjack Mulligan and others. In a non-title match at the Dallas Sportatorium, he lost to the Ultimate Warrior, who was then known as the Dingo Warrior. In that match, Adams used a piledriver on the Warrior, and somehow the force of the piledriver hit Adams' throat; which had been hit earlier due to interference by manager Percy Pringle during a pre-match altercation. Unable to continue, Adams allowed the Warrior to pin him following a flying elbow. Chris gave the Warrior a title shot, and narrowly defeated him. Adams also faced Abdullah the Butcher in some matches, all of which ended either in a countout or a DQ against Abdullah. Mulligan and Bruiser Brody were involved in a three-way feud during that time; while South African Steve Simpson joined World Class as an ally of Adams and the Von Erichs. Between July and September 1986, many of the top stars of World Class, including Adams, Parsons, Hyatt, John Tatum, and the Freebirds, defected to the Universal Wrestling Federation, following longtime WCCW booker Ken Mantell, who had resigned and joined the UWF after a falling-out with Fritz.

World Class heavyweight champion Chris Adams was forced to relinquish his championship on September 17, 1986; one day after being convicted of misdemeanor assault from an incident on June 30, 1986, inflight between San Juan, Puerto Rico and Dallas. According to testimony and accounts from the Dallas Morning News, Adams, who was under the influence, verbally assaulted a stewardess when he became belligerent when it was announced that liquor sales would no longer be available in flight. He then head-butted an American Airlines co-pilot before Kevin Von Erich restrained Adams. He left World Class shortly thereafter and joined Ken Mantell in the UWF, when it was told that Adams would lose the belt to Black Bart on September 19 at the Dallas Sportatorium, a decision that enraged Adams, then-booker Gary Hart and several other wrestlers. Adams was sentenced on October 25 to 90 days in jail and fined $500. He began his sentence on November 1, and was released on January 29, 1987. Kevin Von Erich later defeated Black Bart for the World Class heavyweight title at the Cotton Bowl, and held that belt for nearly a year.

It was also at this point that Kerry Von Erich was involved in a motorcycle accident (June 4, 1986) and suffered injuries that later worsened when he attempted to return to the ring too soon (an attempt said by some observers to have taken place under heavy pressure from Fritz) and would finally necessitate the amputation of his right foot. As a result of this accident, the organization's attendance dropped greatly. WCCW's fortunes declined further in 1986–87 with the Texas oil businesses entering a recession and Mike Von Erich's health and substance abuse problems and eventual suicide. As a result of these multiple catastrophes, attendance in both Dallas and Fort Worth plummeted; according to some former WCCW wrestlers, many fans became disillusioned with the Von Erichs as the supposedly "clean-living" brothers' drug use became harder to cover up, and they frequently no-showed cards the promotion booked in smaller towns. Sportatorium cards, which at the beginning of the year before drew well over 4,000 had dropped to less than 1,000 within a time span of six months.

In an attempt to keep World Class hot, by means of running long-term angles, Brian Adias, who was billed as the childhood friend of the Von Erichs (which is legitimate, since Brian grew up with the Adkissons in Denton and also went to high school with Kerry), began a storyline with them by turning heel against Mike Von Erich during a match, then eventually began feuding with Kevin Von Erich later on. This angle, similar to the one used with Chris Adams in 1984, proved to be unsuccessful, and pairing Adias with Alberto Madril to form a newer version of The Dynamic Duo (and even going so far as using Adams and Hernandez's "Bad to the Bone" as their ring entrance music) made matters worse. Adias lacked the charisma and talent that Adams had during his feud with the Von Erichs, and Kevin and Mike dominated this feud from start to finish. There was one high mark in that feud, when Kevin passed out from concussion complications during an eight-man tag team match. That incident was worked into an angle in which Adias tried to end Von Erich's career by applying the Oriental Spike, a finisher made famous by Terry Gordy. Madril often drew the ire of the crowd by shouting in Spanish, sometimes using obscene language. The Los Angeles native eventually turned babyface and began feuding with Adias by 1987. Late in the year, the promotion briefly added another show to its lineup called Texas Championship Wrestling, which aired nationally on the now defunct cable network Tempo Television, filling a void left by the folding of USA All-Star Wrestling. The new show retained USA All-Star Wrestling's Steve Stack as its host and was taped at Gilley's Club in Pasadena, Texas, the site of its predecessor. The matches and interviews on Texas Championship Wrestling did not acknowledge the ongoing storylines taking place on the territory's other current television shows.

==== 1987 ====
Between late-1986 and the latter part of 1987, World Class was behind the UWF as the top promotion, but things were about to change soon, which would include the return of many major World Class stars by year's end. In April, World Class suffered another death when Mike Von Erich, after being diagnosed with toxic shock syndrome, was found dead near Lewisville Lake, having committed suicide by overdosing on Placidyl. The upcoming Parade of Champions card held in May was renamed in honor of both David and Mike Von Erich. This event, which drew over 20,000 fans the previous three years, drew less than 6,000 for the 1987 event, which featured Kevin Von Erich defending the World Class title against Nord The Barbarian, who in actuality was a protégé of Bruiser Brody's. To make matters worse, the WWF had also reached the pinnacle of its success at WrestleMania III, and began to gain more national exposure. The Dallas Sportatorium received a facelift with a new ring and red, yellow and blue ring ropes with a World Class banner placed at Section D of the arena, with the American flag moved to Section C. By now, attendance for WCCW shows was nearly dead. Gary Hart (who along with Brody were now World Class' main go-to people) formed a new stable alongside wrestler/manager Phil Apollo (who was then known as Vince Apollo) which included Brian Adias, Al Madril, and Al Perez, who would eventually win the World Class heavyweight title by August. Eric Embry, Frankie Lancaster, The Rock 'n' Roll RPMs (Mike Davis and Tommy Lane), and Jason Sterling (the son of The Missing Link) also competed for a time in World Class.

In mid-1987, after the buyout of the UWF by Jim Crockett Promotions, Ken Mantell launched his own Wild West Wrestling promotion with the popular Fort Worth nightspot Billy Bob's Texas as its homebase. Headlining for Mantell's group were such former World Class stars as Fabulous Lance (formerly Lance Von Erich, who by then had walked out on Fritz in a dispute over money), Wild Bill Irwin, The Missing Link, Buddy Roberts, Brian Adias, Jack Victory, Tatum and Parsons. Bill Mercer left World Class to become the ring announcer for Wild West Wrestling. After only a few months, Mantell agreed to return to WCCW as co-promoter with Kevin and Kerry Von Erich, following Fritz's decision to sell out his interest in the promotion; Wild West was absorbed into WCCW, and most of its talent — with the notable exception of Fabulous Lance, who was now considered persona non grata by the Adkissons after his abrupt departure earlier in the year — returned along with Mantell. The organization later co-promoted cards with World Class, including a May 1988 card in Mesquite, Texas which had Marc Lowrance as the ring announcer, and former World Class referee Jerry Usher officiating several matches. Wild West Wrestling continued promoting cards at Billy Bob's until late 1988, with its programming now featuring its Championship Sports broadcasts from the Sportatorium.

Chris Adams, who stayed with the NWA following their buyout with the UWF, abruptly left the NWA over a money dispute (reportedly against the wishes of Michael Hayes to stay), and returned to World Class beginning with the October 3, 1987 card at The Sportatorium. Upon returning, Adams worked an angle with Al Perez and manager Gary Hart, engaging in several matches — including one in which he supposedly won the World Class title following a victory over Perez. The decision was reversed by referee John Keeton who was pushed into Adams's superkick by Perez (backup ref Bronco Lubich made the three-count when Adams surprised Perez with a sunset flip), thus Keeton DQed Adams and Perez retained the championship, a match which fans felt was a Dusty Finish. Al Perez stated in a 2018 interview that the plan was for Adams to regain the World Class belt from him, however Fritz Von Erich ruled against it and told Perez that he was to remain the champion.

Adams also engaged in a brief feud with Brian Adias, mostly out of the rights to use the ring entrance music Bad to the Bone, which Adias used, much to the objection of Adams, who was best known for this ring entrance music with Gino Hernandez. Chris also had some bouts with Eric Embry and Vince Apollo for a short time.

Kerry Von Erich also returned to World Class, wrestling with a prosthetic foot, and during a November card at the Sportatorium, he interfered in a match between his brother Kevin and Brian Adias. Adias, who taunted Kerry to enter the ring, was discus-punched out of the ring by Kerry, and then later Kerry and Kevin Von Erich drop-kicked manager Percy Pringle out of the ring, which brought the Sportatorium patrons to their feet. Kerry even bodyslammed Ted Arcidi during the post-match brawl.

As the UWF/NWA merger was complete, many top names returned to World Class, including Buddy Roberts, Terry Gordy, The Angel of Death Iceman King Parsons, Jason Sterling, and Jeff Raitz. The Iron Sheik also joined the organization later on. Upon Ken Mantell's return, WCCW held its final Christmas Day Star Wars show, during which one of the most infamous incidents in Texas wrestling history — known to wrestling purists as the "Christmas Day Massacre" — occurred. WCWA champion Al Perez and Kerry Von Erich were scheduled to face each other in a steel cage main event for the title, with Gary Hart handcuffed to Fritz to prevent interference. However, before the match began, Terry Gordy ran in and made disparaging remarks about Kerry and his motorcycle accident, which started a fight. Buddy Roberts, Iceman King Parsons and the late Angel of Death stormed the ring and handcuffed Fritz to the cage, delivering a furious beating while Kerry was being ganged up by Gordy. Eventually Kevin stormed the ring to save both Kerry and Fritz. After the attack, Fritz — who was normally seen walking away from vicious attacks under his own power — was assisted out of the ring by Kerry and Kevin. Upon leaving the ring, Fritz staged a seizure by self-collapsing onto the floor of Reunion Arena, and was supposedly rushed to a hospital; local news media reported this as a top story, not realizing until later that the entire incident had been a work. Kerry, after an hour or so, returned to the ring to face Perez but lost the match due to outside interference from Hart. The next day on Championship Sports, announcer Marc Lowrance recapped the incident throughout the course of the two-hour program.

Afterwards, World Class promoted the renewed Freebird-Von Erich rivalry pitting Terry Gordy, Buddy Roberts, King Parsons and The Angel of Death against Kevin and Kerry Von Erich and Chris Adams, with Steve or Shaun Simpson also helping to even the odds. The unusual twist of this feud was the absence of Michael Hayes, who was still in the NWA, but would eventually return to World Class, as a face, wrestling alongside the Von Erichs, starting a civil war between Hayes, Roberts and Gordy. Gordy would eventually join Hayes and the Von Erichs later on, but this occurred only weeks before the angle ran its course.

One high mark in this renewed rivalry was a February 1988 country-whipping match between Kevin and Kerry against Gordy and Roberts. Iceman King Parsons and Chris Adams got involved in the match, and eventually turned into a six-man brawl. David Sheldon, aka The Angel of Death, also got involved, and orchestrated a four-on-two gang up on both Kerry and Adams with Kevin handcuffed to the ring rope. Kevin managed to escape and chase Sheldon, Roberts, Gordy and Parsons away.

Another was a planned match between Adams against Parsons, with Kevin and Gordy seconding their respective partners. This event, which occurred three weeks after the Christmas Day Massacre of 1987, turned into a four-on-two brawl, and eventually erupted into a battle royale. Announcer Marc Lowrance exclaimed during the brawl that 20 men were coming into the ring, which proved to be true as wrestlers from the back tried to end the carnage.

==== 1988 ====
Another hot feud taking place during this period was Chris Adams against both Terry Taylor and Iceman King Parsons, both of whom were brought into WCCW by Mantell. Parsons and Adams resumed their feud that began in the UWF, while Taylor came in during late-January 1988, duping everyone into believing that he was a changed wrestler and wanted to tag-team with Adams again, after a violent feud of their own. This led to a February 12, 1988 angle at the Sportatorium in which Taylor was to have faced Al Perez for the WCWA World title. Adams came in wondering what Taylor was doing in World Class, and then later went on a tirade against Perez, demanding a title shot. Terry Gordy later came in and began fighting with Adams, with Kerry Von Erich running in to battle Perez and Gordy. Taylor, who did not get involved in the carnage, then sucker-punched Adams and broke his left hand with two piledrivers, as Von Erich and Gordy were fighting up the aisle. Adams missed about a month of wrestling as a result, returning with a bandaged left hand. The card itself, which featured the infamous country-whipping match, had at least a half-dozen piledrivers performed in the ring; including two by Taylor on Adams, another by Gordy on Kevin Von Erich, and two from Kerry – one on Gordy and another on Roberts. In another strange angle, Adams wrestled Taylor while wearing a catcher's mask in Fort Worth, in order to protect Chris from legit injuries he sustained during an earlier match in Missouri. Adams lost that match by DQ when he hit Taylor with the mask. In another contest, Adams won by DQ when Taylor brought Mike George and Masahiro Chono in a three-on-one gangup.

Meanwhile, Kerry Von Erich won the World Class title from Perez; and lost it to Iceman Parsons following an infamous incident during a March 1988 card in which the lights at the Sportatorium went out during the match, and when the lights returned, Kerry was down on the mat, with Parsons pinning him. Michael Hayes, who was fighting outside the ring with Buddy Roberts, was also down outside the ring. Many wrestlers believed at one time that Kevin Vaughn, formerly Lance Von Erich, was responsible for the lights being turned off which resulted in the unknown attack on both Hayes and Kerry. Kerry regained the championship the following May at the final Texas Stadium Parade of Champions card.

By May 1988, World Class and the Memphis-based CWA began a working agreement with Renegades Rampage, allowing wrestlers from both organizations to appear either in Dallas or in the Memphis area. Jerry Lawler entered the Sportatorium ring for the first time in late-May and faced Kerry Von Erich for the first time. This bout never took place, as Lawler sucker-punched Kerry in the ring, resulting in Kerry being taken out on a stretcher. Adams and Taylor took their angle to Memphis and competed against each other several times at the Mid-South Coliseum.

In the summer of 1988, the major storyline pitted Michael Hayes and Steve Cox against the Samoan Swat Team, managed by Buddy Roberts; along with a series of bouts between Jerry Lawler and Kerry Von Erich over the World Class and AWA titles. Chris Adams, Terry Gordy and Terry Taylor all left World Class at that time (Adams, who was also a promoter under the L&A Promotions banner, would eventually return towards the end of the year, as a wrestler and trainer). Gary Hart also left World Class during this time, and would not return to Dallas again until 1991 under the Global Wrestling Federation banner. Hart's decision to leave World Class (other than being under contract with the NWA) was mostly due to his concern that the promotion he, Mercer and Grant help build in a time span of eight years, would go out of business. World Class would in fact be defunct two years later. Hart mentioned this in the Heroes of World Class DVD documentary, as well as not liking the idea of Ken Mantell buying a portion of the company, which he also revealed on the Triumph and Tragedy of WCCW DVD.

=== Pro Wrestling USA (1987–1988) ===
Several unsuccessful attempts had been made in 1987–88 to take World Class national; among them was a sparsely-attended Von Erichs over America tour, and a merger between World Class, the AWA and CWA the following year. A major pay-per-view card, AWA SuperClash III, was held in Chicago in December 1988, featuring a world title unification match in which Jerry Lawler defeated Kerry Von Erich. However, SuperClash III was not a hit, and Pro Wrestling USA was dissolved.

=== Final days of the WCCW (1989–1990) ===
After SuperClash III, Ken Mantell and Fritz Von Erich sold WCCW to CWA owner Jerry Jarrett. According to Skandor Akbar, Jarrett got sued by Kevin, although his brother Kerry welcomed Jarrett to the promotion. The combined federation became known as the USWA, originally called the United States Wrestling Alliance. Jarrett would run the new USWA out of two headquarters: one in Dallas (the weekly shows in Fort Worth being discontinued at this point, however several Fort Worth cards were still held), the other in Memphis. The deal made Jarrett 60 percent owner of World Class, with Kevin and Kerry Von Erich being 40 percent owners.

In addition, the Sportatorium began to run free wrestling tapings for its Championship Sports broadcast on KTVT and for several months on its Wild West Wrestling program, which in some markets accompanied its World Class Championship Wrestling broadcasts, featuring its top stars wrestling preliminary wrestlers and up-and-coming stars, very similar to the Memphis Wrestling programs seen there. These broadcasts lasted until August 1990. A few markets, including Las Vegas, included a three-hour block of wrestling from the USWA promotion (two hours from Dallas and one hour from the Memphis' CWA promotion). John Keaton left the promotion soon afterwards and was replaced by former Wild West Wrestling referee Harold Harris.

Following the merger of World Class with the CWA and AWA, the promotion originally developed an angle pitting wrestlers from Texas against wrestlers from Tennessee. This would eventually evolve into a new angle that would bring a return to sellout crowds to the Sportatorium for the first time in over six months: Eric Embry against Devastation Inc.

Embry, who became the promotion's booker and lead babyface, was originally offered a contract by Skandor Akbar to join Devastation Inc., which he refused to join. This resulted in several gangups on Embry by his stable, including Cactus Jack Manson, King Parsons and Gary Young. Jeff Jarrett, who was feuding with Embry over the World Class light heavyweight title, joined Embry's side and helped out fight off Akbar's Army, with Brickhouse Brown and later Chris Adams (returning to World Class after a six-month hiatus) getting involved. On two occasions, Embry duped Akbar, who referred to Embry as "the flamboyant piece of trash", into signing a contract to join Devastation Inc., once in which he took his $5,000 cash bonus and decked Akbar after quitting; and again when Embry and Akbar signed a document which was revealed by matchmaker Frank Dusek to be a wrestling match between the two. The popularity of Embry reached its high point when he lost a loser leaves town match to Gary Young, due to outside interference by Cactus Jack Manson. This prompted the return of Percy Pringle to the promotion, who would later campaign to bring Embry back to World Class, as well as being the victim of several attacks by Akbar and his troops. The campaign led to Embry's reinstatement to World Class, but it would cause Dusek to be temporarily suspended by WCCW Board Member Elmore Hayes.

Among the famous incidents that occurred during this angle include Embry being hit with a baseball bat by Akbar, Cactus Jack and Gary Young (in a mask as The Zodiac) during an April 1989 battle against Akbar; both of whom were hiding under the Sportatorium ring for some three hours. Frank Dusek, who served as the special referee, was also lit up with the baseball bat and piledriven by Young during the melee. Afterwards, Embry induced vomiting in the ring (which was censored on television). Prior to that, another infamous angle occurred when Embry, who was a special referee in a match between Kerry Von Erich and Gary Young, was fighting with Akbar. The battle carried out into the Sportatorium parking lot, when a hand came through the fire door to kidnap Embry (later revealed to be Killer Tim Brooks). Chris Adams, Kerry Von Erich and Jimmy Jack Funk then carried a bloodied Embry out of the parking lot back into the arena following that vicious attack.

Another angle involved the late referee Harold Harris. Harris, who was using a British accent to make people believe he was from England (prompting Frank Dusek to say that if Harris was from England, then Chris Adams was Paul McCartney), drew controversy for favoring the heels, and on a few occasions, like the WWE's Danny Davis and the NWA's Teddy Long, Harris would execute fast three-counts on the heels and slow three-counts on the babyfaces. During one infamous incident, Embry piledrived Harris as he was attempting to get a spot as a referee in some matches. Harris was eventually "fired" by matchmaker Frank Dusek following a controversial Texas heavyweight title match in which Gary Young, dressed as "The Super Zodiac," defeated Eric Embry for the title, when Young grabbed a chain from the pocket of Harris (who took a bump by Embry) and blasted Embry for the win.

Shortly afterwards, during an interview segment in which Akbar introduced Harris as the "sergeant of arms" of Devastation Inc, Harris, Iceman King Parsons, Brickhouse Brown, Gary Young, Cactus Jack Manson and Skandor Akbar orchestrated a six-on-one gangup on Dusek, with Harris smashing a wooden chair over Dusek's head. Marc Lowrance exclaimed the incident as being "absolutely sickening," then later said that he was told not to use those words. Lowrance, outraged by the incident, later told Akbar to "kiss my ass" as the tag team match between Kerry Von Erich and Jeff Jarrett vs. Mick Foley and Gary Young was about to begin; and even walked away from the broadcast table while Akbar was conducting a tirade of his own. Foley and Young won the match, again due to interference by Akbar. Tojo Yamamoto was then introduced as the "President of World Class," who drew the ire of the fans due to his lack of action for the Dusek incident(Even putting the blame on Dusek himself for firing Harris in the first place), then later getting involved in several altercations with various wrestlers, including a vicious attack against Dusek in an empty Sportatorium, resulting in Dusek's left arm being in a cast. Lowrance was also physically restrained by P.Y. Chu-Hi (Phil Hickerson) as manager Tojo Yamamoto berated Lowrance, after Lowrance called Yamamoto a liar and having no respect for him. Embry came out to save Lowrance from any further harm. Prior to that, Lowrance was involved in a heated confrontation against Yamamoto, including one instance in which he started off by calling Yamamoto "a disgrace to wrestling and to himself.", which led to Yamamoto angrily grabbing the mic that Lowrance was holding after Lowrance attempted to cut him off. At the end of that interview, an unusually angry Lowrance said "go to black", signaling for a commercial message.

=== The United States Wrestling Association (1989–1990) ===
With all of these aforementioned occurrences, everything came down to a battle for control of World Class on August 4, 1989, at the Dallas Sportatorium. Embry wrestled Hickerson in a steel cage match, with the winner gaining control of World Class (Embry representing the USWA, and Hickerson representing WCCW). During the match, Yamamoto shouted instructions at Hickerson, with Lowrance grabbing the mike out of his hands on several occasions. Finally, after a 10-minute battle, Embry managed to avoid a body avalanche from Hickerson and pin him to win, thus officially changing World Class into the USWA. This was necessary in reality because the Adkissons owned the World Class name and would no longer allow Jerry Jarrett to continue using the name any further after this event.

After the match, Embry and manager Percy Pringle walked to the D section of the Sportatorium and tore the World Class Championship Wrestling banner off of the wall (in the same spot where the American flag once was displayed). Various wrestlers such as Matt Borne then stomped and spit on it. Lowrance and Chris Adams, who celebrated Embry's victory in the ring, did not partake in the post-match festivities, showing respect to the Adkissons and the World Class name, and neither Kevin nor Kerry were on hand during the celebration. Other World Class banners, all owned by the Adkisson family, above the Sportatorium were later removed, replaced with various World flags. The red World Class ring aprons were covered by the Renegades Rampage logo except for one section of the ring, but all of the aprons would be replaced as well as the ring itself.

The Dallas Sportatorium was refurbished with a new ring, and ring aprons with the Renegades Rampage logo. Section D also had a large yellow banner promoting Renegades, which did not sit well with some longtime patrons who were more used to the American flag or the World Class banner displayed there. The main camera position was also relocated to the Section D area, and the broadcast table returned to its original position on the southern end of the arena. For a time, a USWA wrestling banner was placed above the Section D sign, but was later moved adjacent to the E and F sections of the Sportatorium, or the east corner of the arena. Its syndicated programs, World Class Championship Wrestling and Wild West Wrestling were later renamed USWA Challenge and USWA Main Event respectively. The latter program featured a main event of its Saturday Championship Sports program, with the remainder of the program featuring past World Class cards dating as far back as late-1987. These two programs aired in this format until 1991.

Some of the hot feuds of the era included Chris Adams and Toni Adams vs. Phil Hickerson and Tojo Yamamoto; Kerry Von Erich vs. Tarras Bulba (with Kerry being pinned by Bulba's iron claw); and Eric Embry vs. Billy Travis. Travis later feuded with Chris Adams, Jeff Jarrett and Kevin Von Erich. Kerry later wrestled against Mark Calaway, who was known as The Punisher at that time, while Embry was involved in a blinding angle (similar to the angle used with Chris Adams nearly four years before) involving a white bottle (which may have been Freebird Hair Cream) which Travis used against Embry to blind him. In fact, Billy Travis became the Sportatorium's biggest heel wrestler who would often sing a line of various songs during ringside interviews, heckle the crowd, and on several occasions smash a wooden guitar over the head of several wrestlers. One notable such incident occurred in October 1989 when he cold-cocked Percy Pringle with a guitar during an interview, then claimed that the guitar was given to him by Mick Jagger. During one incident, Travis spanked Toni Adams in the center of the ring at the Sportatorium, with Chris handcuffed on the ring rope; and in another infamous incident, Travis cold-cocked Adams with a coke bottle over his head, prompting announcer Marc Lowrance to announce that Adams may be dead. Chris only received a minor cut on his scalp and returned to wrestle the following day, even disguising himself as another wrestler to gain revenge against Travis.

In December 1989, Adams and Embry began feuding. The angle, developed by Embry and Adams, was brought about when Adams and Embry blamed each other for two significant losses in tag team matches, including one during a tag team tournament between Billy Travis and Gary Young. A few weeks later, a six-man tag match between Adams, Embry and Bill Dundee vs. Travis, Young and Skandor Akbar, was held. After taking punishment for 11 minutes by Young, Travis and Akbar, Adams was thrown out of the ring. Embry and Toni Adams attempted to help Chris, and an argument ensued, which led Embry to shove Toni down to the floor. As Embry attempted to help her back up, Chris attacked him, and a brawl between Adams and Embry ensued. Dundee attempted to help stop the carnage, but was hit by Embry, while Akbar, Young and Travis stood in the ring cheering. The carnage was broken up when wrestlers from the back, including Steve Austin and Matt Borne, came in to help get order restored. Two weeks later, Adams and Embry faced each other in the ring, with the majority of the crowd cheering for Embry in the beginning, and the hint of a possible heel turn by Adams. As the match progressed with no true dominance by either wrestler, Embry hit referee Bronko Lubich during the bout, which resulted in a DQ. As referee Tony Falk came in to stop the fight, Adams hits him, and another brawl between Embry and Adams ensued, with wrestlers again coming out to separate the two. According to Embry, the idea was for Embry to turn heel and start a long feud with Adams, but the crowd would not boo for Embry and turning Adams heel wouldn't work either, since he is a beloved figure in the area himself. The angle was short-lived, and Embry left the organization for a while, but returned a few months later and reteamed with Adams and continued his battles with Akbar's group until the USWA pulled out of Dallas.

Two major feuds erupted in 1990: one between Chris Adams and "Stunning" Steve Austin, and the other between Kerry Von Erich and Matt Borne. The Adams-Austin feud started slow, but eventually picked up huge heat thanks in part to good promoting by Adams, who decided to bring in former girlfriend Jean Clarke (also known as Jeanie Adams for a time, and later married to Austin) and then-wife Toni Adams into the feud; resulting in a mixed tag-team war very similar to the Adams-Sunshine vs. Garvin-Precious battles of the early 1980s. On a few occasions, Jeanie was spanked by Adams in the center of the ring; and on one interview segment, Clarke and Austin showed pictures of Adams with different women, including a 1986 picture with Sunshine and the World Class belt, and another of Adams and Clarke from his early days in England. The angle, which Adams created and wanted to promote initially in 1986 with Jeanie and the late Gino Hernandez, even gained national headlines, as the National Enquirer ran a story on the Adams-Toni-Jeanie-Austin angle. The climax of the Austin-Adams feud occurred just before the USWA/World Class breakup; when Austin wrestled in a come-as-you-are match, with Austin wearing his football gear from his playing days at UNT, and Adams wearing his Judo gi and using a kendo stick.

The Kerry Von Erich-Matt Borne feud began in May 1990 when Borne turned heel by attacking Chris Von Erich during an interview segment with the soon-to-be departed Marc Lowrance at the Sportatorium. A week or so later, Borne and Von Erich battled in a pinfall counts anywhere in the building match, which eventually continued outside the Sportatorium. During the outside confrontation (in a thunderstorm, among other things), Von Erich slammed Borne onto the hood of a parked vehicle and also attempted to attack him with a piece of two-by-four. Minor damage occurred with the vehicles, and the ensuing fight continued until Chris Adams, Jeff Jarrett, and others broke up the brawl. Promoter Max Andrews suspended Kerry for his actions, but no time frame was given as to how long he was suspended. This drew the ire of Borne, who demanded the USWA forfeit Kerry's Texas heavyweight belt. Instead, Kerry was reinstated days later as the two battled for the belt, which Borne won thanks to interference by Percy Pringle. Pringle joined Borne in his feud with Kerry, until June 1990, when Von Erich left for the WWF. Borne also left a short time later to join that organization as Doink The Clown. Percy later joined Austin and Clarke in their feud with Chris and Toni Adams, with Chris Von Erich and at times Kevin Von Erich getting involved. Borne also had a few matches against Kerry's brother Kevin.

Another feud that drew headlines was between "Hollywood" John Tatum and Bill Dundee, with valet Tessa in the middle of the feud. Originally brought in by Tatum, Tessa, like Sunshine years before, turned face and joined Dundee's side. During a match against Tatum, Kevin Von Erich, who beat Tatum, swept Tessa off her feet and carried her into the dressing room much to the dismay of Tatum. During a July 1990 match, Tatum knocked Tessa unconscious following a superkick to the head, resulting in Tessa being carried out on a stretcher. In that same event, Toni Adams was carried out on a stretcher following a flying splash from the top rope onto Toni in the ring by Steve Austin, while Toni was on top of her husband Chris, who was piledrived on the concrete floor by Austin earlier, to protect him. These two incidents resulted in a few stations canceling its USWA broadcasts due to its violent nature.

During this time, other wrestlers such as Terry Taylor made brief appearances, and future GWF wrestling star Rod Price made his debut by attacking Kerry during an interview segment.

Under Jarrett, World Class/USWA Dallas was finally able to turn itself around financially, and became modestly profitable during the 1989–1990 period. However, because of a revenue dispute with the Adkissons (who still owned 40 percent of the Dallas promotion), Jarrett ultimately pulled the promotion out of Dallas after the September 7, 1990 card. A week before Jarrett's departure, KTVT dropped its long-running Saturday night wrestling telecasts; according to some reports, the cancellation was the result of frequent on-air profanity (mostly from Eric Embry), despite multiple warnings from station management, as well as the controversial superkick incident between John Tatum and Tessa.

Kevin Von Erich, without the benefit of television (as the result of KTVT's cancellation of Saturday Night's Championship Sports), the absence of his brother Kerry, and longtime World Class guru Gary Hart (who was starting his Texas Wrestling Federation promotion at the time), began promoting Sportatorium wrestling himself, bringing back the World Class Championship Wrestling name on September 14, 1990. Longtime World Class mainstays Chris Adams, King Parsons, Kevin's brother Chris Von Erich, Percy Pringle, John Tatum, David Sheldon, Steve Austin, Jeanie Clarke and Toni Adams remained, while wrestlers associated with the Memphis end of the USWA left. Steve Simpson and Brian Adias also returned to the promotion, with a few appearances by former WCCW referee David Manning. Initially, the return of World Class proved to be a modest success (which included the return of ring announcer Marc Lowrance and a few appearances by Bill Mercer), but financial sources ran out quickly and attendance at the Sportatorium dropped considerably to sometimes fewer than 500. As a result, on November 23, 1990, Von Erich held its last World Class Championship Wrestling show at the Sportatorium, which featured Kevin winning the Texas heavyweight championship from The Angel of Death in the show's final match. After that match, referee Bronko Lubich announced his retirement from the sport. Lubich would return a few times as a special referee afterwards in the Global Wrestling Federation, with his last appearance in 1994. A month later, the USWA returned to the Sportatorium, but only for a limited basis, as promoters Max Andrews, Joe Pedicino, and Boni Blackstone were getting their Global Wrestling Federation promotion ready to go for the summer of 1991. WCCW veterans went on to compete in other promotions, including Gary Hart's Texas Wrestling Federation group in North Dallas.

=== Legacy ===
Several attempts to revive WCCW since then have been modest at best: in 1991, Kevin Von Erich began a working agreement with Boston-based International Championship Wrestling, which renamed itself International World Class Championship Wrestling. During that brief time in IWCCW, Kevin had a legendary interview in which Tony Rumble, aka The Boston Bad Boy, made derogatory remarks about Kevin and his brothers, after which Kevin ran Rumble out of the interview studio. The following year, Kevin began promoting a few scattered cards under the WCCW banner (featuring Kerry, who had been released from the WWF, and Chris Adams). Finally, in 1997, Gary Hart – with no participation by either Kevin or Fritz—launched a World Class-in-name-only independent promotion at the Sportatorium. This organization, known as World Class II: The Next Generation, featured only a few of the surviving wrestlers from the original WCCW group (most notably Chris Adams, Iceman Parsons and Maniac Mike Davis), as well as Gary's son, Chad Hart; it folded in less than a year. That promotion was also co-owned by Bill Mercer and Mickey Grant, and some believe that Adams was also a silent partner in World Class II. Adams, Mike Davis and Terry Gordy died in 2001, and the Sportatorium, which stood since 1934, was demolished in 2003, but not before Kevin Von Erich toured the damaged arena for the last time, along with filmmaker Brian Harrison. In 2008, Gary Hart died from a heart attack shortly after returning home from an shoot interview. Two years later, Skandor Akbar and Toni Adams had died, and in 2013, Percy Pringle, who was one of the last surviving heel managers in World Class, passed.

Kevin Von Erich released a compilation DVD of classic Von Erichs matches in 2004. Rumors of an impending WWE buyout of the WCCW syndicated broadcast video library began to spread on internet message boards the following year, and on June 5, 2006, the company issued a press release announcing that the purchase had been finalized. Footage from KTVT's "Championship Sports" telecasts was not included in the buyout and is not owned by the WWE. WWE released a DVD titled The Triumph and Tragedy of World Class Championship Wrestling on December 11, 2007. A documentary by Chicago filmmaker Brian Harrison on WCCW and the Von Erichs, Heroes of World Class, was released on DVD on June 15, 2006, to rave reviews from fans and critics alike. An updated "Director's Cut" DVD of Heroes of World Class, 30 minutes longer than the original, was released in December 2006. The documentary featured interviews from several of the key figures in World Class, including Kevin, Mercer, Grant, Hart, Adams, Skandor Akbar, Marc Lowrance, David Manning and Johnny Mantell. On February 14, 2007, WWE 24/7 debuted WCCW on WWE 24/7 hosted by Kevin Von Erich and Michael Hayes.

In 2009, the entire Von Erich family was inducted into the WWE Hall of Fame. World Class' two major venues, Reunion Arena and Texas Stadium, were demolished soon thereafter. Reunion Arena was imploded on November 17, 2009, while Texas Stadium saw the same fate nearly five months later, on April 11, 2010.

In May 2018, Imperial Wrestling Revolution, an Oklahoma-based independent wrestling promotion, announced they had changed their name to World Class Revolution in honor of World Class Championship Wrestling, with the blessing of Kevin Von Erich and the Von Erich family.

A 2023 sports drama film, The Iron Claw, produced by A24 chronicles the history of the Von Erich family and World Class' history as a whole. The film is directed by Sean Durkin, the film stars Zac Efron, Lily James, Jeremy Allen White, Harris Dickinson, Maura Tierney, Maxwell Jacob Friedman, Chavo Guerrero Jr. and Holt McCallany.

== Programming ==
Weekly wrestling shows were staged there on Tuesday nights until August 1978, then were moved to Sunday nights until the early '80s, and finally were held on Friday nights until the promotion's demise. In the early 1980s, WCCW began its hour-long weekly syndicated television show which introduced numerous innovative production techniques, many of which are still commonly used today. The promotion was also the first to use familiar rock songs as entrance music for its wrestlers. The show was syndicated across the United States, and at one point arguably scored higher ratings than Saturday Night Live.

By the fall of 1983, the opening sequence of World Class' syndicated broadcasts began with a NASA photo of Earth, taken during the Apollo 16 mission back in 1972. An animated satellite would beam down over Dallas, and as it moves east, the World Class logo would appear and move across to the upper left hand corner of the picture. Two more satellite beams aired two highlights from World Class: one involving a match between Kerry Von Erich and Michael Hayes, and another between David Von Erich and Jimmy Garvin. Another opening sequence featured one segment with Kevin Von Erich performing a flying splash onto Terry Gordy, and another with Michael Hayes attacking Kerry Von Erich, who was handcuffed onto a ring rope. In late 1984, a different World Class logo was used and two different match sequences: one involving Skandor Akbar urging The Missing Link to head-butt Kerry Von Erich; while the other scene was Kerry Von Erich slamming Kamala to the mat, with his handler Friday outside the ring moving his fist down in disgust, with announcers Marc Lowrance and Ralph Pulley watching. This opening sequence would be used again in 1991 with Boston-based International World Class Championship Wrestling. By 1987, the opening sequence changed; beginning with a dusk photo of Dallas, and other shots of the city, including the Dallas North Tollway, before the World Class logo would appear; then scenes of past wrestling events (mostly from the 1987 Texas Stadium event) would follow before the logo reappeared again.

WCCW's syndicated show was usually taped at the Sportatorium beginning in 1981, with two hour-long shows being recorded every other Friday. These telecasts were, in the beginning, seen in only a few markets and were hosted at various times by Gene Goodson, Steve Harms, and Marc Lowrance; when the show was taken over in 1982 by Continental Productions and went to international syndication, well-known north Texas journalist/sportscaster Bill Mercer (a former play-by-play announcer for the Dallas Cowboys, Texas Rangers and Chicago White Sox along with other Texas-based teams) became the ringside announcer at the Sportatorium. For a few months he co-hosted with Jay Saldi, and by 1983, hosted the hour-long program alone, with Lowrance filling in for Mercer from time to time. After Mercer left in 1987 to join Ken Mantell's Wild West Wrestling promotion, Lowrance returned to the broadcast position, where he would remain until resigning to become a minister in July 1990. Lowrance would later be paired by former wrestler-turned-matchmaker Frank Dusek for one year, then later by "The Beauty" Terrance Garvin. Lowrance left World Class/USWA in May 1990 to become a full-time Methodist minister, after nearly 10 years with the organization. Craig Johnson replaced Lowrance for the final two months of telecasts, due to the unavailability of Bill Mercer, who was a ringside announcer for Gary Hart's wrestling promotion at the Metroplex Arena. Percy Pringle III would replace Garvin, who returned to the wrestling ring. Horton eventually went on to host the USWA and GWF telecasts in later years, and Pringle went on to greater fame in the WWF/WWE as Paul Bearer, the manager of The Undertaker. Lowrance did return to the Sportatorium as ring announcer in September 1990 (as did Mercer, who filled in for Lowrance on a few cards), when World Class seceded from the USWA, and appeared occasionally during the 1990s in other Dallas-based promotions such as the Global Wrestling Federation. Lowrance is no longer in the business, but does appear at vintage pro wrestling conventions on occasion.

The promotion also held matches on Monday nights in Fort Worth at the North Side Coliseum (an indoor rodeo arena, known today as the Cowtown Coliseum), until the mid-1970s, then relocated to the Will Rogers Memorial Center, where it remained until WCCW discontinued its regular Fort Worth shows in 1988, although the promotion did promote Fort Worth house cards on occasion until 1989. These matches aired Saturday nights on local station KTVT, as a 90-minute broadcast entitled Saturday Night Wrestling, which was expanded to two hours in November 1983 and retitled Championship Sports. From late 1988 until the station cancelled wrestling in 1990, KTVT's tapings were held at the Sportatorium on Saturday mornings. Dan Coats, who had served as ring announcer in Fort Worth for many years prior to the Von Erich era, called the action on KTVT from 1966 until 1976, when Bill Mercer was brought in to replace him. When Mercer moved to the syndicated telecasts, Marc Lowrance took over the KTVT show. As he would with the syndicated series, Jon Horton became host of Championship Sports for its last few episodes.

== WCCW personnel ==
=== Announcers ===
Ring Announcer Gene Summers at the Sportatorium in 1981

Lowrance was also the ring announcer at the Sportatorium for several years before moving to TV full-time; he was originally hired in 1980 to replace Boyd Pierce, who had been with the group since the 1960s and left to join Bill Watts' Mid-South Wrestling promotion. Other ring announcers in WCCW included George Preston (1960s), Joe Rinelli (from the 1960s until 1988) and Ralph Pulley (mid-1980s), who also served as a referee for a time. Lowrance, who was 21 at the time, was originally hired for a three-week stint until a permanent replacement was found for Pierce. Soon after, when no one was found, Lowrance's stay with World Class became permanent. Doyle King, and for one week Jim Ross, worked as fill-in announcers for Lowrance for the Fort Worth telecasts. In 1981, Dallas rock 'n roll singer Gene Summers took over the ring announcing duties for both the Dallas and Fort Worth matches. However, his tenure was cut short due to conflicting European music tours. It was during this time period that he released the now famous recording "Ballad of Moon Dog Mayne" under the pseudonym of Ricky Ringside. Summers' brief announcing career in 1981 lasted from March 8 to May 31. Marc Lowrance returned to the ring announcing duties in Dallas, and either Ralph Pulley or Joe Rinelli handled the Fort Worth matches.

- Dan Coates
- George Preston
- Boyd Pierce
- Gene Goodson
- Bill Mercer
- Marc Lowrance
- Ralph Pulley
- Joe Rinelli
- Craig Johnson
- Gene Summers
- Doyle King
- Steve Harms

=== Referees ===
Lubich was also for a time the head booker. Manning held a full-time position as a teacher and wrestling coach at MacArthur High School in Irving.

- Danny Plechas
- Dick Raines
- Marvin Jones
- Tully Blanchard
- David Manning
- Bronko Lubich
- Fred Sinclair
- Rick Hazzard
- John Keeton
- John Renesto
- Harold T. Harris
- James Beard
- Nick Roberts
- Tony Falk
- Ralph Pulley

== Major shows ==
- Fritz Von Erich Retirement Show
- Parade of Champions
- Cotton Bowl Extravaganza
- Wrestling Star Wars
  - 1981
  - 1982
  - 1983
  - 1984
  - 1985
  - 1986
  - 1987
  - 1989

== Championships ==
| Championship | Last Recognized Champion | From | Until | Other names | Notes |
|---|---|---|---|---|---|
| WCWA World Heavyweight Championship | Jerry Lawler | June 6, 1966 | 1990 | NWA United States Heavyweight Championship (1966–1968); NWA American Heavyweight Championship (1968–1986) | |
| WCCW Television Championship | Tony Atlas | 1979 | April 1987 | NWA Television Championship (Texas Version 1979–1982) | |
| WCWA World Tag Team Championship | Scott Braddock and Cactus Jack | January 1967 | 1989 | NWA American Tag Team Championship (1967–1986) | |
| WCWA World Six-Man Tag Team Championship | Michael Hayes, Kevin and Kerry Von Erich | December 25, 1982 | 1988 | WCCW World Six-Man Tag Team Championship (1982–1986) | |
| WCWA World Light Heavyweight Championship | Eric Embry | September 13, 1987 | May, 1989 | | |
| WCCW Middle Eastern Championship | Mike Von Erich | August 7, 1985 | 1986 | | |
| WCCW All-Asia Tag Team Championship | David and Kevin Von Erich | June 4, 1982 | August 15, 1982 | | |
| WCWA Texas Heavyweight Championship | Kevin Von Erich | 1930s | 1991 | Texas Heavyweight Championship (1930s-1948); NWA Texas Heavyweight Championship (1948–1986) | Taken over by the USWA |
| WCWA Texas Tag Team Championship | Steve and Shaun Simpson | May, 1945 | 1989 | NWA Texas Tag Team Championship (1945–1981) | |
| WCWA Brass Knuckles Championship | Tony Atlas | March 6, 1958 | Fall 1987 | | Championship name revived in 1998 |
| NWA World Tag Team Championship (Texas Version) | Kerry Von Erich and Al Madril | July 1957 | April 1982 | | Inactive between 1970 and 1981 |
| CWA Southwestern Heavyweight Championship | John Tatum | October 2, 1989 | July 5, 1990 | | |

== See also ==
- Big Time Wrestling (Boston)
- Big Time Wrestling (Detroit)
- Big Time Wrestling (San Francisco)
