= Lance Von Erich =

American professional wrestler

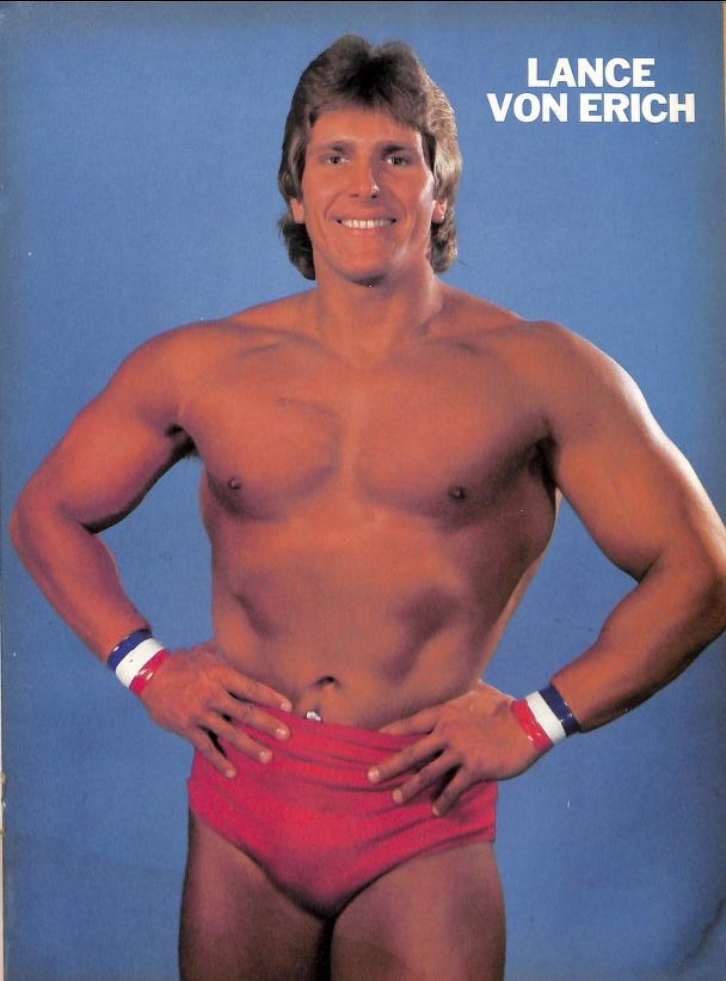
- Von Erich, c. 1986

Personal information
- Born: William Kevin Vaughan; April 24, 1960 (age 66) Arlington, Texas, U.S.

Professional wrestling career
- Ring names: The Fabulous Lance; Lance Von Erich; Ricky Vaughan
- Billed height: 6 ft 2 in (188 cm)
- Billed weight: 265 lb (120 kg)
- Trained by: Dennis Sheldon; Sandy Barr; Buck Zumhofe
- Debut: 1984
- Retired: 1996

William Kevin Vaughan (born April 24, 1960) is an American retired professional wrestler, better known by the ring name Lance Von Erich.

== Professional wrestling career ==
=== Early career (1984–1985) ===
Vaughan was discovered by World Class Championship Wrestling (WCCW) based out of Dallas, Texas in the latter months of 1984. He trained there for a short period of time until Fritz Von Erich sent him to work with Don Owen in Portland, the National Wrestling Alliance (NWA)'s Pacific Northwest territory. There, he wrestled under the name "Ricky Vaughan" and wrestled as a babyface, often teaming with Bobby Jaggers and Billy Jack Haynes. As Ricky Vaughn, he won the NWA Pacific Northwest Tag Team Championship with Billy Jack Haynes on May 11, 1985 when they defeated the team of Mega Maharishi and Kendo Nagasaki; the titles were later vacated when Haynes departed from the territory.

=== World Class Championship Wrestling (1985–1987) ===
In October 1985, when Mike Von Erich was unable to wrestle due to toxic shock syndrome, Vaughan went to World Class Championship Wrestling (WCCW) to take his place in the feud against the Fabulous Freebirds. He adopted the name Lance Von Erich and was billed as the son of Fritz Von Erich's "brother" Waldo. In reality, neither Vaughan nor Waldo were related to the Adkisson family or each other.

Kevin Von Erich, as well as most of the family, was adamantly against bringing Vaughan in as another Von Erich, but Fritz insisted, especially as Kevin and Kerry were wrestling two or three times a day in various places throughout the Texas territory. The deception made the Von Erichs look like liars to their fans, who normally saw them as good guys who could do no wrong.

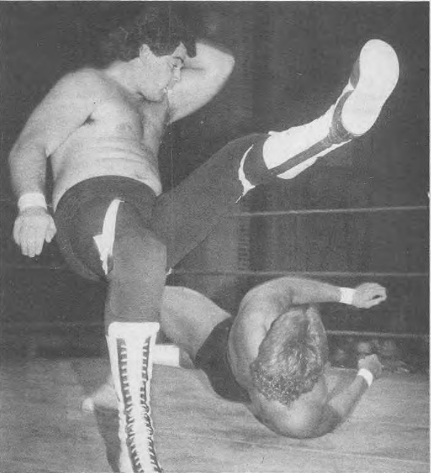
Brian Adias attempts an elbow drop on Von Erich, c. 1987

On October 28, 1985, Vaughan wrestled Ric Flair in Fort Worth, Texas, in the last NWA World title match in the World Class territory. The match ended in a no contest when both men were counted out of the ring; World Class withdrew from the NWA in February 1986. On May 4, 1986 at The 3rd Annual Von Erich Parade of Champions he teamed with Kerry Von Erich and Steve Simpson to defeat The Fabulous Freebirds for the WCWA World Six-Man Tag Team Championship. On September 1, 1986, he entered in a tournament for the vacant WCWA World Tag Team Championship with Chris Adams. The team made it to the finals where they were defeated by Matt Borne and Buzz Sawyer. Lance got his revenge on November 17, 1986, when he teamed with Dingo Warrior to capture the titles back from Borne and Sawyer. In October 1986, he wrestled a tour for New Japan Pro-Wrestling, most notably his disqualification victory against Kengo Kimura on October 9.

=== Late career (1987–1996) ===
When demands for more money in 1987 were not met by Fritz, Vaughan jumped to a rival territory, Wild West Wrestling. In a rare breach of kayfabe, Vaughan's non-relationship to the family was exposed by Fritz on television in retaliation. Because the Von Erich surname was a registered trademark, Vaughan wrestled under the ring name "Fabulous Lance" after leaving World Class. He subsequently wrestled in Puerto Rico's World Wrestling Council after Wild West Wrestling folded.

In May 1993, after a hiatus, Vaughan returned and was back wrestling as Lance Von Erich for promotions such as International Wrestling Federation in Florida and International World Class Championship Wrestling in New York. In December 1993, he wrestled a tour of India. In 1994, he wrestled a tour of South Africa for the United Kingdom's All Star Wrestling. In 1996, he wrestled a tour of Malaysia for the National Wrestling Alliance, before retiring.

== Personal life ==
Prior to becoming a wrestler, Vaughan was a real estate agent and he competed in weightlifting and bodybuilding competitions. Vaughan set various State and national records in powerlifting and bodybuilding tournaments. Vaughan was chosen to represent South Africa in The Mr Universe Competition. After wrestling, he owned health clubs in South Africa. Vaughan sold his health clubs for an estimated five million in 1996. Vaughan's net worth at the time was estimated to be six million dollars.

== Championships and accomplishments ==
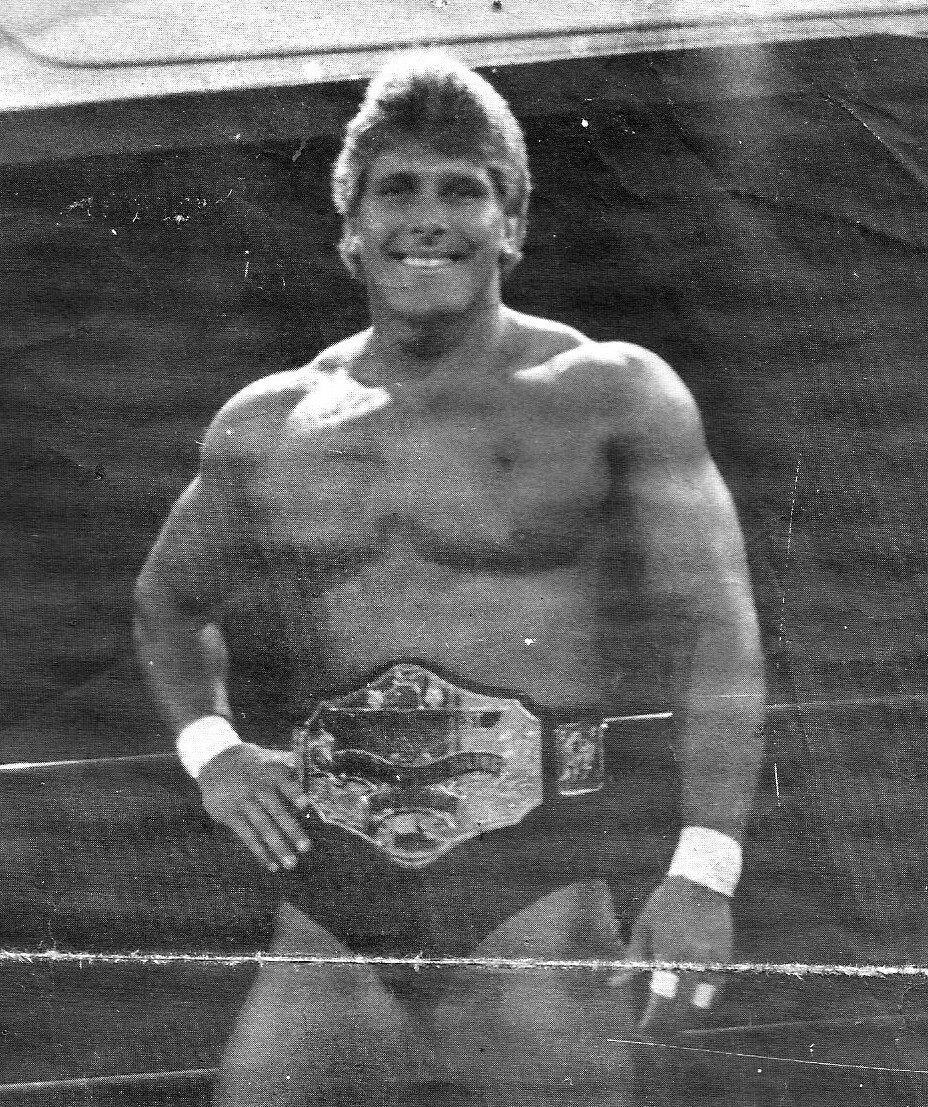
Von Erich as the NWA Pacific Northwest Heavyweight Champion in 1985.

- Pacific Northwest Wrestling
  - NWA Pacific Northwest Heavyweight Championship (1 time)
  - NWA Pacific Northwest Tag Team Championship (1 time) - with Billy Jack Haynes
- Pro Wrestling Illustrated
  - PWI ranked him #311 of the top 500 singles wrestlers in the PWI 500 in 1991
  - PWI ranked him #317 of the top 500 singles wrestlers of the "PWI Years" in 2003
- World Class Wrestling Association
  - WCWA Television Championship (1 time)
  - WCWA World Six-Man Tag Team Championship (2 times) - with Kerry Von Erich and Kevin Von Erich (1 time) and with Mike Von Erich and Kevin Von Erich (1 time)
  - WCWA World Tag Team Championship (1 time) - with Dingo Warrior

== In other media ==
In 2020, Vaughan released an autobiography of his time as a Von Erich and wrestling around the world titled "Lance By Chance".

Lance was portrayed by Maxwell Jacob Friedman in the A24 movie The Iron Claw, in a very brief appearance, based on the life of Kevin and The Von Erich family (listed simply as "Lance" in the credits).

== See also ==
- Von Erich Family
