= WCWA World Tag Team Championship =

Professional wrestling tag team championship

- Championship belt from the WCCW era

Details
- Promotion: Southwest Sports; NWA Big Time Wrestling; World Class Championship Wrestling; World Class Wrestling Association
- Date established: January 1967
- Date retired: 1989

Other names
- NWA United States Tag Team Championship; NWA American Tag Team Championship; WCCW American Tag Team Championship
Statistics
- First champions: The Internationals (Al Costello and Karl Von Brauner)
- Most reigns: Kevin and Kerry Von Erich (5 reigns) (as individual) Kerry Von Erich (10 reigns)
- Longest reign: The Fabulous Freebirds (Terry Gordy and Michael Hayes) (173 days)
- Shortest reign: Steve Cox and Michael Hayes (3 days)

The WCWA World Tag Team Championship was the primary professional wrestling tag team championship promoted by the Dallas–Fort Worth metroplex area–based World Class Wrestling Association (WCWA). The championship was originally introduced as the NWA United States Tag Team Championship in 1967, when the promotion was known as NWA Big Time Wrestling. It was later renamed the NWA American Tag Team Championship in 1969. In 1982 Big Time Wrestling, changed their name to World Class Championship Wrestling and the title became the WCCW American Tag Team Championship. In 1986 WCCW became World Class Wrestling Association and the championship was rebranded as the WCWA World Tag Team Championship. In 1989 the title was won by Cactus Jack and Scott Braddock, where it was transformed into the USWA World Tag Team Championship. As it is a professional wrestling championship, it is won not by actual competition, but by a scripted ending to a match. (Note: Hornbaker (2016) p. 550: "Professional wrestling is a sport in which match finishes are predetermined. Thus, win–loss records are not indicative of a wrestler's genuine success based on their legitimate abilities – but on now much, or how little they were pushed by promoters") The WCWA Texas Tag Team Championship served as the secondary tag team championship in the promotion from 1950 to 1989.

The first confirmed NWA United States Tag Team Champions was The Internationals, the team of Al Costello and Kurt Von Brauner), with their first confirmed title defense took place in January 1967. The Dynamic Duo (Gino Hernandez and Chris Adams) were the last team to hold the WCCW American Tag Team Championship. When WCCW withdrew from the NWA and was renamed WCWA, the promotion decided to introduce the WCWA World Tag Team Championship as the promotions top title. Matt Borne and Buzz Sawyer because the first team to hold the WCWA World Tag Team Championship, defeating Chris Adams and Lance Von Erich in the finals of a tournament. Scott Braddock and Cactus Jack were the last team to hold the title as WCWA merged with the Continental Wrestling Association to form the United States Wrestling Association. The Von Erichs (Kerry and Kevin Von Erich holds the record for most reigns, with 5 as a team, while Kerry Von Erich held the championship a total of 10 times with various partners. The longest reign lasted 448 days as Billy Red Lyons and Fritz Von Erich held the championship from January 30, 1968, to April 22, 1969. Mr. Hito and Mr. Sakurada held the championship for one day, the shortest of all championship reigns.

== Title history ==
Key
No.	Overall reign number
Reign	Reign number for the specific champion
Days	Number of days held
N/A	Unknown information

No.	Champion	Championship change			Reign statistics		Notes	Ref.
No.	Champion	Date	Event	Location	Reign	Days	Notes	Ref.
NWA United States Tag Team Championship
1	The Dusek Family (Ernie and Emil)	December 6, 1942	Show	Houston, Texas	1	(Note: The length of the championship reign is too uncertain to calculate.)	The Duseks were billed as “team match champions of the nation”, listed as a possible predecessor to the American Tag Team Championship	
Championship history is unrecorded from December 6, 1942 to January 1967.
2	The Internationals (Al Costello and Karl Von Brauner)	January 1967 (NLT)	BTW Show	(Note: The location of the championship match was not captured as part of the championship documentation.)	1	(Note: The exact date on which the Internationals won the title is unknown, which means the title reign lasted at least 21 days.)	Won a tournament, unclear on who they defeated in the finals.	
3	The Von Erichs (Fritz and Waldo)	February 21, 1967	BTW Show	Dallas, Texas	1	168		
4	Brute Bernard and Mike Paidousis	August 8, 1967	BTW Show	Dallas, Texas	1	34		
5	The Von Erichs (Fritz and Waldo)	September 11, 1967	BTW Show	Ft. Worth, Texas	2	22		
6	Brute Bernard and Mike Paidousis	October 3, 1967	BTW Show	Dallas, Texas	2	20		
7	Gary Hart and Spoiler #1	October 23, 1967	BTW Show	Ft. Worth, Texas	1	99		
8	Billy Red Lyons and Fritz Von Erich (3)	January 30, 1968	BTW Show	Dallas, Texas	1	448		
NWA American Tag Team Championship
9	The Spoilers (Spoiler #1 (2) and Spoiler #2)	April 22, 1969	BTW Show	Ft. Worth, Texas	1	22	Spoiler #2 lost a match to Apollo on May 17, 1968 and was unmasked to reveal Smasher Sloan under the mask.	
10	Fritz Von Erich (4) and Grizzly Smith	May 14, 1969	BTW Show	Dallas, Texas	1	(Note: The exact date on which Fritz Von Erich and Grizzy Smith lost the title is unknown, which means the title reign lasted between 1 day and 14 days.)		
11	The Spoilers (Spoiler #1 (2) and Spoiler #2)	May 28, 1968 (NLT)	BTW Show		2	(Note: The exact date on which the Spoilers won the title is unknown, which means the title reign lasted between 52 and 65 days.)		
12	Gary Hart (2) and The Spoiler (4)	July 19, 1968	N/A		2	4	Sloan gave his half of the championship to Hart and left the area.	
13	Grizzly Smith (2) and Fritz Von Erich (5)	July 23, 1968	BTW Show	Houston, Texas	2	42		
14	Gary Hart (3) and The Spoiler (5)	September 10, 1968	BTW Show	Dallas, Texas	3	98	Jardine started wrestling without mask in October 1968.	
15	Dan Miller and Fritz Von Erich (6)	December 17, 1968	BTW Show	Dallas, Texas	1	(Note: The exact date on which Curry replaced Miller on the team is unknown, which means the title reign lasted between 1 day and 104 days.)		
16	Fred Curry and Fritz Von Erich (7)	March 1969 (NLT)	BTW Show		1	(Note: The exact date on which Curry replaced Miller and the date the title was vacated are unknown, which means the title reign lasted between 1 day and 190 days.)	Don Miller was injured by Johnny Valentine, Fred Curry replaced him.	
—	Vacated	1969	—	—	—	—	Championship vacated after Curry was injured by Johnny Valentine.	
17	Wahoo McDaniel and Thunderbolt Patterson	June 27, 1969	BTW Show	Houston, Texas	1	(Note: The exact date on which McDaniel and Patterson lost the championship the title is unknown, which means the title reign lasted between 1 day and 63 days.)	Won the championship by winning a tournament.	
18	Dusty Rhodes and Baron von Raschke	1969	BTW Show	Ft. Worth, Texas	1	(Note: The exact date on which Rhodes and Von Raschke lost the title is unknown, which means the title reign lasted between 1 day and 63 days.)		
19	Wahoo McDaniel and Thunderbolt Patterson	August 1969 (NLT)	BTW Show		2	(Note: The length of McDaniel and Patterson's second reign is too uncertain to calculate.)		
—	Vacated	1969	—	—	—	—	Championship vacated for undocumented reasons.	
20	Boris Malenko and Lord Charles Montagne	September 30, 1969 (NLT)	BTW Show		1	(Note: The length of Malenko and Montagne's reign is too uncertain to calculate.)	Records are unclear as to whom they defeated to win the championship.	
21	Wahoo McDaniel (3) and Antonio Pugliese	January 20, 1970	BTW Show	Dallas, Texas	1	45		
22	Killer Karl Kox and Great Malenko (2)	March 16, 1970	BTW Show	Ft. Worth, Texas	1	(Note: The exact date on which Kox and Malenko lost the title is unknown, which means the title reign lasted between 1 day and 169 days.)		
Championship history is unrecorded from March 16, 1970 to 1970.
—	Vacated	1970	—	—	—	—	Championship vacated for undocumented reasons.	
23	Killer Karl Kox (2) and Mike York	September 2, 1970	BTW Show		1	(Note: The exact date on which Kox and York lost the title is unknown, which means the title reign lasted between 1 day and 103 days.)	Defeat Wahoo McDaniel and Mr. Wrestling in tournament final; still champions as of October 8, 1970.	
Championship history is unrecorded from September 2, 1970 to December 14, 1970.
24	The Outlaws (Dick Murdoch and Dusty Rhodes (2))	December 14, 1970 (NLT)	BTW Show		1	(Note: The exact date on which the Outlaws won the title is unknown, which means the title reign lasted between 1 day and 103 days.)	Records are unclear as to whom they defeated to win the championship.	
25	George Scott and Tim Woods	December 15, 1970	Dallas, Texas	N/A	1	(Note: The exact date on which Scott and Woods lost the title is unknown, which means the title reign lasted between 1 day and 44 days.)	BTW Show	
26	Bronko Lubich and Chris Markoff	January 28, 1971 (NLT)	BTW Show		1	(Note: The exact date on which Lubich and Markoff won the title is unknown, which means the title reign lasted between 148 and 191 days.)		
27	Johnny Valentine and Wahoo McDaniel (4)	June 25, 1971	BTW Show	Houston, Texas	1	24		
28	Thunderbolt Patterson (3) and Toru Tanaka	July 19, 1971	BTW Show	Ft. Worth, Texas	1	108		
29	Thunderbolt Patterson (4) and Johnny Valentine (2)	November 4, 1971	BTW Show	Corpus Christi, Texas	1	82	Tanaka gave his half of the championship to Valentine.	
30	Dean Ho and Fritz Von Erich (8)	January 25, 1972	BTW Show	Dallas, Texas	1	(Note: The exact date on which Ho and Von Eric lost the title is unknown, which means the title reign lasted between 1 day and 33 days.)		
Championship history is unrecorded from January 25, 1972 to February 28, 1972.
31	Red Bastien and Dean Ho (2)	February 28, 1972 (NLT)	BTW Show		1			
Championship history is unrecorded from February 28, 1972 to 1972.
32	Brute Bernard (3) and Missouri Mauler	1972 (NLT)	BTW Show		1			
Championship history is unrecorded from 1972 to 1973.
33	Mark Lewin and The Spoiler (6)	1973	BTW Show		1	(Note: The exact date on which Lewin and the Spoiler won and lost the title is unknown, which means the title reign lasted between 1 day and 89 days.)		
Championship history is unrecorded from 1973 to March 1973.
34	Jose Lothario and Ivan Putski	March 1973 (NLT)	BTW Show		1	(Note: The exact date on which Lothario and Putski won the title is unknown, which means the title reign lasted between 130 and 219 days.)	Records are unclear as to whom they defeated to win the championship.	
35	Black Gordman and Great Goliath	August 8, 1973	BTW Show	Ft. Worth, Texas	1	(Note: The exact date on which Black Gordman and Great Goliath lost the title is unknown, which means the title reign lasted between 1 day and 176 days.)		
36	Jose Lothario (2) and Mil Máscaras	1973	BTW Show		1	(Note: The exact date on which Lothario and Mil Mascaras won and lost the title is unknown, which means the title reign lasted between 1 day and 175 days.)		
—	Vacated	January 1974	—	—	—	—	Championship vacated after Curry was also injured by Johnny Valentine.	
Championship history is unrecorded from January 1974 to January 22, 1974.
37	The Blackjacks (Blackjack Lanza and Blackjack Mulligan)	January 22, 1974	BTW Show	Houston, Texas	1	181	Supposedly defeated the Wild Samoans (Afa and Sika) in a tournament final, but the tournament was fictitious.	
38	Tex McKenzie and Ken Patera	July 22, 1974	BTW Show	Ft. Worth, Texas	1	(Note: The exact date on which McKnezie and Patera lost the title is unknown, which means the title reign lasted between 1 day and 153 days.)		
39	The Blackjacks (Blackjack Lanza and Blackjack Mulligan)	1974	BTW Show		2	(Note: The exact date on which the Blackjacks won the title is unknown, which means the title reign lasted between 1 day and 62 days.)		
40	Tex McKenzie (2) and Johnny Valentine (3)	September 23, 1974	BTW Show	Ft. Worth, Texas	1	(Note: The exact date on which the title was abandoned is unknown, which means the title reign lasted between 1 day and 99 days.)		
—	Vacated	1974	—	—	—	—	Championship vacated and abandoned by NWA Big Time Wrestling.	
41	The Von Erichs (David and Kevin Von Erich)	October 15, 1978	BTW Show	Dallas, Texas	1	127	Defeated Dory Funk, Jr. and Terry Funk to win the championship, unclear if it was a tournament final or a match for the vacant championship	
42	Mark Lewin (2) and The Spoiler (7)	February 19, 1979	BTW Show	Ft. Worth, Texas	2	102		
43	El Halcón and Jose Lothario (3)	June 1, 1979	BTW Show	Houston, Texas	1	31		
44	Gino Hernandez and El Gran Markus	July 20, 1979	BTW Show	Houston, Texas	1	35		
45	El Halcón and Jose Lothario (4)	August 24, 1979	BTW Show	Houston, Texas	2	(Note: The exact date on which the team lost the title is unknown, which means the title reign lasted between 69 and −221 days.)		
46	Gino Hernandez and El Gran Markus	November 1979	BTW Show		2	(Note: The exact date on which Hernandez and Gran Markus won the title is unknown, which means the title reign lasted between 1 day and 15 days.)		
47	Jose Lothario (5) and Tiger Conway Jr.	November 16, 1979	BTW Show	Houston, Texas	1	28		
48	Gino Hernandez and El Gran Markus	December 14, 1979	BTW Show	Houston, Texas	3	14		
49	El Halcón and Jose Lothario (6)	December 28, 1979	BTW Show	Houston, Texas	3	14		
50	Mr. Hito and Mr. Sakurada	January 11, 1980	BTW Show	Houston, Texas	1	63		
51	Tiger Conway Jr. (2) and Jose Lothario (7)	March 14, 1980	BTW Show	Houston, Texas	1	101		
52	Mr. Hito and Mr. Sakurada	June 23, 1980	BTW Show	Amarillo, Texas	2	1		
—	Vacated	June 24, 1980	—	—	—	—	Championship vacated after a match against Kerry and Kevin Von Erich that ended inconclusively	
53	Mr. Hito and Mr. Sakurada	July 1, 1980	BTW Show	Amarillo, Texas	3	31	Defeated Kevin and Kerry Von Erich in a rematch.	
54	El Halcón (4) and Kevin Von Erich (2)	August 1, 1980	BTW Show	Dallas, Texas	1	(Note: The exact date on which the team lost the title is unknown, which means the title reign lasted between 61 and 91 days.)		
55	Gino Hernandez (4) and Gary Young	October 1980	BTW Show	Houston, Texas	1	(Note: The exact date on which Hernandez and Young won the title is unknown, which means the title reign lasted between 72 and 102 days.)	Sweet Brown Sugar substituted for El Halcón in the championship match	
56	Bruiser Brody and Kerry Von Erich	January 11, 1981	BTW Show	Dallas, Texas	1	(Note: The exact date on which Brody and Von Erich vacated the title is unknown, which means the title reign lasted between 110 and 140 days.)		
—	Vacated	May 1981	—	—	—	—	Championship vacated after Bruiser Brody stopped working for Big Time Wrestling	
57	Brian Blair and Al Madril	June 1981	BTW Show		1	(Note: The exact date on which Blair and Madril won and lost the title is unknown, which means the title reign lasted between 63 and 121 days.)	Won a tournament to become champions	
58	Killer Tim Brooks and Armand Hussein	September 1981	BTW Show	Ft. Worth, Texas	1	(Note: The exact date on which Brooks and Hussein lost the title is unknown, which means the title reign lasted between 24 and 53 days.)		
Championship history is unrecorded from September 1981 to October 24, 1981.
59	The Great Kabuki and Chan Chung (Note: Chan Chung previously held the title under the name "Mr. Sakurada") (4)	October 24, 1981 (NLT)	BTW Show		1	(Note: The exact date on which Kabuki and Chung won the title is unknown, which means the title reign lasted between 1 day and 53 days.)	Records are unclear as to whom they defeated to become champions.	
60	Terry Orndorff and Kerry Von Erich (2)	October 25, 1981	Wrestling Star Wars	Dallas, Texas	1	(Note: The exact date on which Orndorff and Von Erich lost the title is unknown, which means the title reign lasted between −297 and 167 days.)		
Championship history is unrecorded from October 25, 1981 to 1982.
WCCW American Tag Team Championship
61	Al Madril (2) and Kerry Von Erich (3)	1982	WCCW Show		1	(Note: The exact date on which Madrill and Von Erich won the title is unknown, which means the title reign lasted between 1 day and 100 days.)	Records are unclear as to whom they defeated to win the championship	
62	King Kong Bundy and Bugsy McGraw	April 11, 1982	WCCW Show	Dallas, Texas	1	85		
63	The Von Erichs (Kerry (4) and Kevin (3))	July 5, 1982	WCCW Show	Ft. Worth, Texas	1	69		
64	King Kong Bundy (2) and Bill Irwin	September 12, 1982	WCCW Show	Dallas, Texas	1	75		
65	The Fabulous Freebirds (Terry Gordy and Michael Hayes)	November 26, 1982	WCCW Show	Dallas, Texas	1	202		
66	Bruiser Brody (2) and Kerry Von Erich (5)	June 16, 1983	Wrestling Star Wars	Dallas, Texas	2	(Note: The exact date on which Brody and Von Erich vacated the title is unknown, which means the title reign lasted between 1 day and 135 days.)		
—	Vacated	1983	—	—	—	—	Championship vacated after Bruiser Brody was injured.	
67	Bulldog Brower and Roddy Piper	October 1983	House show	Detroit, Michigan	1	(Note: The exact date on which Brower and Piper lost the title is unknown, which means the title reign lasted between 1 day and 30 days.)	Won a fictitious tournament to become champions	
68	The Super Destroyers; Super Destroyer #1 and Super Destroyer #2)	October 1983	House show	Indianapolis, Indiana	1	(Note: The exact date on which the Super Destroyers won the title is unknown, which means the title reign lasted between 55 and 84 days.)	Fictitious title change	
69	Brian Adias and King Parsons	December 25, 1983	Christmas Star Wars	Dallas, Texas	1	36		
70	The Super Destroyers; Super Destroyer #1 and Super Destroyer #2)	January 30, 1984	WCCW Show	Ft. Worth, Texas	2	97		
71	Rock 'N Soul (King Parsons (2) and Buck Zumhofe)	May 6, 1984	Parade of Champions	Irving, Texas	1	13		
72	The Super Destroyers; Super Destroyer #1 and Super Destroyer #2)	May 19, 1984	WCCW Show	San Antonio, Texas	3	46	Rock 'N Soul unmasked The Super Destroyers after the match, revealing them to be Bill and Scott Irwin.	
73	The Super Destroyers; Super Destroyer #1 and Super Destroyer #2)	July 4, 1984	Independence Day Star Wars	Ft. Worth, Texas	2	86	Parsons defeated Bill Irwin in a singles match.	
74	The Long Riders (Bill and Scott Irwin)	September 28, 1984	WCCW Show	Dallas, Texas	4	24		
75	The Fantastics (Bobby Fulton and Tommy Rogers)	October 22, 1984	WCCW Show	Ft. Worth, Texas	1	81		
76	The Midnight Express (Dennis Condrey and Bobby Eaton)	January 11, 1985	WCCW Episode #161	Dallas, Texas	1	164	Aired on January 26, 1985.	
—	Vacated	March 8, 1985	—	—	—	—	Championship vacated after a match where the Midnight Express' manager Jim Cornette interfere in the match.	
77	The Fantastics (Bobby Fulton and Tommy Rogers)	May 5, 1985	Parade of Champions	Irving, Texas	2	50	Defeated The Midnight Express in a two-ring match despite one of the Midnight Express pinning one of the Fantastics. The count by referee Rick Hazzard ended at 3 just before a count by referee David Manning with a Fantastic pinning the other Midnight Express member started.	
78	Chris Adams and Gino Hernandez (5)	June 24, 1985	WCCW Show	Ft. Worth, Texas	1	81		
—	Vacated	September 13, 1985	—	—	—	—	Championship vacated after a match against Kerry and Kevin Von Erich ended in a double disqualification.	
79	The Von Erichs (Kerry (6) and Kevin (4))	September 20, 1985	WCCW Show	Dallas, Texas	2	28	Defeated Chris Adams and Gino Hernandez in a rematch.	
—	Vacated	October 18, 1985	—	—	—	—	Championship vacated after a match against Chris Adam and Gino Hernandez ended inconclusively	
80	Chris Adams and Gino Hernandez (6)	November 28, 1985	Thanksgiving Star Wars	Dallas, Texas	2	(Note: The exact date on which Adams and Hernandez were stripped of the title is unknown, which means the title reign lasted between 34 and 278 days.)	Defeated Kerry and Kevin Von Erich in a rematch.	
—	Vacated	1986	—	—	—	—	Championship vacated when Adams and Hernandez split up. WCCW would later leave the NWA to become World Class Wrestling Association.	
WCWA World Tag Team Championship
81	Matt Borne and Buzz Sawyer	September 1, 1986	Labor Day Star Wars	Ft. Worth, Texas	1	67	Defeated Chris Adams and Lance Von Erich in a tournament final.	
82	Dingo Warrior and Lance Von Erich	November 17, 1986	WCWA Show	Ft. Worth, Texas	1	14		
83	Brian Adias (2) and Al Madril (3)	December 1, 1986	WCWA Show	Ft. Worth, Texas	1	93		
84	The Fantastics (Bobby Fulton and Tommy Rogers)	March 4, 1987	WCWA Show	Lubbock, Texas	3	33		
—	Vacated	April 6, 1987	—	—	—	—	Championship vacated after a match against The Rock 'n' Roll RPMs (Mike Davis and Tommy Lane)	
85	The Fantastics (Bobby Fulton and Tommy Rogers)	May 4, 1987	WCWA Show	Lubbock, Texas	4	53	Defeated The Rock 'n' Roll RPMs in a rematch.	
86	Eric Embry and Frank Lancaster	June 26, 1987	WCWA Show	Dallas, Texas	1	42		
87	The Simpson Brothers (Shaun and Steve)	September 7, 1987	Labor Day Star Wars	Ft. Worth, Texas	1	36		
88	Brian Adias (3) and Frank Lancaster (2)	September 12, 1987	WCWA Show	Ft. Worth, Texas	1	38	Defeated Shaun Simpson and Skip Young to win the championship	
89	The Von Erichs (Kerry (7) and Kevin (5))	October 20, 1987	WCWA Show	Shreveport, Louisiana	3	(Note: The exact date on which the Von Erichs lost the title is unknown, which means the title reign lasted between 42 and 69 days.)		
90	Iceman Parsons (4) and Terry Taylor	1988	WCWA Show		1	(Note: The exact date on which Parsons and Taylor won the title is unknown, which means the title reign lasted between 1 day and 182 days.)		
91	The Von Erichs (Kerry (8) and Kevin (6))	July 1, 1988	WCWA Show	Dallas, Texas	4	42		
92	The Samoan Swat Team (Fatu and Samu)	August 12, 1988	WCWA Show	Dallas, Texas	1	35		
93	Steve Cox and Michael Hayes (2)	September 16, 1988	WCWA Show	Dallas, Texas	1	3		
94	The Samoan Swat Team (Fatu and Samu)	September 19, 1988	AWA/CWA Show	Memphis, Tennessee	2	26		
95	Steve Cox and Michael Hayes (3)	October 15, 1988	5th Cotton Bowl Extravaganza	Dallas, Texas	2	2		
96	The Samoan Swat Team (Fatu and Samu)	October 17, 1988	WCWA Show	Ft. Worth, Texas	3	(Note: The exact date on which the Samoan Swat Team lost the title is unknown, which means the title reign lasted between 107 and 122 days.)		
97	The Von Erichs (Kerry (9) and Kevin (7))	February 1989	N/A	N/A	5	(Note: The exact date on which the Samoan Swat Team left the promotion is unknown, which means the title reign lasted between 1 day and 16 days.)	Title awarded when The Samoan Swat Team left the promotion.	
98	Robert Fuller and Jimmy Golden	February 17, 1989	WCWA Show	Dallas, Texas	1	23	Won the championship by disqualification.	
99	Jeff Jarrett and Kerry Von Erich (10)	March 12, 1989	WCWA Show	Ft. Worth, Texas	1	68		
100	Cactus Jack and Super Zodiac II (Note: Super Zodiac II previously won the championship under the name Gary Young.) (2)	May 19, 1989	WCWA Show	Dallas, Texas	1	21		
101	Jeff Jarrett (2) and Mil Máscaras (2)	June 9, 1989	WCWA Show	Dallas, Texas	1	14		
102	Robert Fuller (2) and Brian Lee	June 23, 1989	WCWA Show	Dallas, Texas	1	7		
103	Matt Borne (2) and Jeff Jarrett (3)	June 30, 1989	WCWA Show	Dallas, Texas	1	35		
103	Scott Braddock and Cactus Jack (2)	August 4, 1989	WCWA Show	Dallas, Texas	1	0		
—	Deactivated	August 4, 1989	—	—	—	—	Championship was replaced by the USWA World Tag Team Championship, with the WCWA closing shortly thereafter.	

== WCCW American Tag Team Championship Tournament (1986) ==
The main event of the Labor Day Star Wars show was a tag team tournament for the vacant WCCW Tag Team Championship. The title had been vacated by the promotion due to the break up of previous champions Chris Adams and Gino Hernandez earlier that year.

Semifinals
Kevin Sullivan and Mark Lewin	Pin
The Batten Twins (Bart Batten and Brad Batten)	12:15
Buzz Sawyer and Matt Borne	CO
The Von Erichs (Kevin and Mike Von Erich)
The Youngbloods (Chris Youngblood and Mark Youngblood)	DQ
Rick Rude and Jos LeDuc
Dingo Warrior and Socko	W
Killer Brooks and The Grappler

Qualifiers
Kevin Sullivan and Mark Lewin	Pin
Buzz Sawyer and Matt Borne
The Youngbloods	W
The Oates Brothers (Jerry and Ted Oates)
Dingo Warrior and Socko	W
Brian Adias and Scott Casey

Finalists
Buzz Sawyer and Matt Borne	W
The Youngbloods
Dingo Warrior and Socko	Pin
Chris Adams and Lance Von Erich

Finals
Buzz Sawyer and Matt Borne	Pin
Chris Adams and Lance Von Erich

== See also ==
- List of National Wrestling Alliance championships
- National Wrestling Alliance
- World Class Championship Wrestling
- United States Wrestling Association
- USWA Tag Team Championship
