= Eric Embry =

American professional wrestler (born 1959)

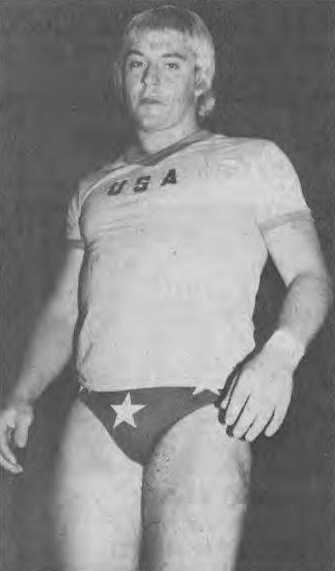
- Embry, c. 1983

Personal information
- Born: Douglas Eric Embry; July 10, 1959 (age 67) Kentucky, U.S.

Professional wrestling career
- Ring name(s): Don Fulton; Don Starr; Eric Embry; Eric Emery
- Billed height: 5 ft 10 in (178 cm)
- Billed weight: 224 lb (102 kg)
- Billed from: Dallas, Texas
- Trained by: Lou Thesz
- Debut: 1977
- Retired: March 28, 1993

Douglas Eric Embry (born July 10, 1959) is an American retired professional wrestler. He is best known for his appearances with Championship Wrestling from Florida, World Class Championship Wrestling, and the United States Wrestling Association.

== Professional wrestling career ==
=== Early career (1977–1987) ===
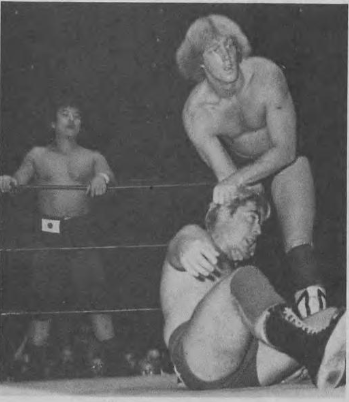
Embry on the ground during a 1981 match with David Von Erich. Mr. Onita is ringside in the background.

Embry wrestled in Southwest Championship Wrestling (later Texas, then USA All Star Wrestling) as one of the Fabulous Blondes, along with Ken Timbs and later Dan Greer. Later, he wrestled for 5 Star Wrestling in Baton Rouge. He would also wrestle in Canada, for Stampede Wrestling in Calgary, Alberta, All Star Wrestling in Vancouver, British Columbia. In 1980 Embry wrestled in Pacific Northwest Wrestling (Portland), as Eric Emery.

In 1985, Embry first joined World Wrestling Council in Puerto Rico. On August 17, 1985, he defeated Super Medico I to win the WWC Puerto Rico Heavyweight Championship. On November 25, 1985, he became a double champion, by defeating Invader III to win the WWC World Junior Heavyweight Championship. On January 18, 1986, Embry lost the Junior Heavyweight title back to Invader III, after nearly two months as champion. On May 17, 1986, after exactly nine months as champion, he lost the Puerto Rico Heavyweight title back to Super Medico I. Embry left WWC in 1987. During Embry's times as a heel, fans (particularly in Puerto Rico) would often chant Erica! Erica! to draw heat, because Eric Embry called the Puerto Rican fans "greasy, slimy Puerto Ricans". He also insulted commentator and former referee from the heel's side, Hugo Savinovich, by calling him "son of a bitch", instead of the correct last name, that led to a heated feud.

=== World Class Championship Wrestling / United States Wrestling Association (1987–1990) ===
Embry joined World Class Championship Wrestling in 1987. Embry was a booker for the Dallas Sportatorium promotion from 1988 until 1991. During his time as booker, Embry lived at the Sportatorium because he had no other place to live. In early 1988, he had a feud with Jason Sterling, where Sterling was offered $100 for every minute he spent in the ring with Embry. Jeff Jarrett won the WCWA World Light Heavyweight Championship from Embry on October 15 of that year, but Embry regained the title in November. After trading the title with Jarrett once more, Embry regained it at SuperClash III on December 13. Two weeks later, he lost the title to Cactus Jack. In 1989, he became a face during his feud with Skandor Akbar and his army before the promotion went out of business.

=== All Japan Pro Wrestling (1990) ===
In the summer of 1990, Embry wrestled a tour for All Japan Pro Wrestling.

=== World Wrestling Council (1990–1991) ===
In late-1990, Embry made his return to WWC and won the WWC Caribbean Tag Team Championship with Rick Valentine twice.

=== United States Wrestling Association (1991–1992) ===
In February 1991, Embry went to Memphis in the United States Wrestling Association, defeating Bill Dundee to win the USWA Texas Heavyweight Championship, turning heel in the process and aligned himself with former rival Tojo Yamamoto. He also teamed up with Tom Prichard and Miss Texas and sparked a Texas vs. Tennessee feud. On May 3, 1991, Embry defeated Jeff Jarrett to win the USWA Southern Heavyweight Championship. His reign didn't last, as he lost the title to Dundee ten days later on May 13, only to regain the title back from Dundee a week later on May 20. On July 15, Embry defeated booker Eddie Marlin and referee Paul Neighbors in a hair vs. hair handicap match, shaving both men bald. On August 12, Embry and Miss Texas lost a hair vs. hair tag team match to Jeff Jarrett (subbing for an injured Dirty White Boy) and the Dirty White Girl, losing Miss Texas' hair as she was the loser of the fall. On November 4, Embry finally lost the Southern title to Tom Prichard, after reigning as champion for nearly six months. Embry and Prichard would switch the title back and forth multiple times until February 1992.

In July 1992, Embry wrestled a tour for Wrestling International New Generations, due to the talent exchange between USWA and W*ING.

=== Retirement ===
On October 30, 1992, Embry's career came to an end due to a road accident in Hawesville, Kentucky, when a big rig truck jack-knifed while coming down a hill hit his vehicle. "I saw it coming, pulled over as close to guardrail as possible, and prayed, please God don't let it be that bad", stated Eric. He was thrown to the back seat. He suffered a badly bruised liver and severe ligament and cartilage damage to his left knee. He said that he took it as a sign from God that it was time to get out of the wrestling business. Fully recovered from his injuries, he attempted a comeback in March 1993, but after one match on March 28, Embry decided to retire after fifteen years.

== Championships and accomplishments ==
- Championship Wrestling from Florida
  - NWA Florida Television Championship (1 time)
- NWA Tri-State
  - NWA Tri-State Tag Team Championship (1 time) – with Chief Frank Hill
- Pro Wrestling Illustrated
  - PWI ranked him #37 of the top 500 singles wrestlers in the PWI 500 in 1992
  - PWI ranked him #32 of the top 500 singles wrestlers in the PWI 500 in 1991
  - PWI Most Inspirational Wrestler of the Year (1989)
- Southwest Championship Wrestling
  - SCW Southwest Junior Heavyweight Championship (3 times)
  - SCW Southwest Tag Team Championship (5 times) – with Ken Timbs (3) and Dan Greer (2)
- Texas Wrestling Federation
  - TWF Light-Heavyweight Championship (1 time)
- United States Wrestling Association
  - USWA Southern Heavyweight Championship (4 times)
  - USWA Texas Heavyweight Championship (3 times)
- Universal Wrestling Association
  - UWA World Junior Light Heavyweight Championship (1 time)
- World Class Wrestling Association
  - WCWA Texas Heavyweight Championship (3 times)
  - WCWA World Light Heavyweight Championship (5 times)
  - WCWA World Tag Team Championship (1 time) – with Frank Lancaster
- World Wrestling Council
  - WWC Caribbean Tag Team Championship (2 times) – with Rick Valentine
  - WWC Puerto Rico Heavyweight Championship (2 times)
  - WWC World Junior Heavyweight Championship (1 time)

=== Lucha de Apuesta record ===
Winner (wager)	Loser (wager)	Location	Event	Date	Notes
Eric Embry (hair)	Eddie Marlin and Paul Neighbors (hair)	Memphis, Tennessee	live event	July 15, 1991	
