= List of World Class Championship Wrestling supercard events =

List of professional wrestling shows by World Class Championship Wrestling

The Dallas–Fort Worth metroplex based professional wrestling promotion World Class Wrestling Association (WCWA) held produced and scripted a number of supercard shows. Matches from some of these shows were taped for future television shows. The World Class Wrestling Association started out under the name "Southwest Sports" from 1940 to 1966, then known as "Big Time Wrestling", a member of the National Wrestling Alliance (NWA), from 1966 until 1982. In 1982 the promotion was renamed World Class Championship Wrestling (WCCW) and grew beyond the limits of the Texas territory, with syndicated television shows available across the United States and internationally. The company was renamed World Class Wrestling Association in 1986 when they left the NWA.

== Southwest Sports ==
| Event | Date | City | Venue | Main Event | Ref(s) |
|---|---|---|---|---|---|
| Parade of Champions | January 31, 1961 | Dallas, Texas | Dallas Sportatorium | Pat O'Connor (c) vs. Dory Dixon in a Two-out-of-three falls match for the NWA World Heavyweight Championship | |
| Parade of Champions | January 29, 1963 | Dallas, Texas | Dallas Sportatorium | Lou Thesz (c) vs. Ray Gunkel in a singles match for the NWA World Heavyweight Championship | |
| Parade of Champions | June 4, 1963 | Dallas, Texas | Dallas Sportatorium | Lou Thesz (c) vs. Dory Dixon in a singles match for the NWA World Heavyweight Championship | |
(c) refers to the champion(s) heading into the match

== NWA Big Time Wrestling ==
| Event | Date | City | Venue | Main Event | Ref(s) |
|---|---|---|---|---|---|
| Parade of Champions | June 24, 1972 | Irving, Texas | Texas Stadium | Dory Funk, Jr. (c) vs. Fritz Von Erich in a singles match for the NWA World Heavyweight Championship | |
| Parade of Champions | March 26, 1974 | Dallas, Texas | Memorial Auditorium | Jack Brisco (c) vs. Clay Spence in a singles match for the NWA World Heavyweight Championship | |
| Parade of Champions | March 27, 1974 | San Antonio, Texas | Municipal Auditorium | Jack Brisco (c) vs. Dory Funk Jr. in a singles match for the NWA World Heavyweight Championship | |
| Superbowl of Wrestling | June 5, 1976 | Irving, Texas | Texas Stadium | Terry Funk (c) vs. Fritz Von Erich in a singles match for the NWA World Heavyweight Championship | |
| Star Wars | June 4, 1981 | Dallas, Texas | Reunion Arena | Bruiser Brody vs. The Great Kabuki | |
| Star Wars | October 25, 1981 | Dallas, Texas | Reunion Arena | Al Madril (c) vs Bill Irwin for the NWA Texas Heavyweight Championship | |
| Christmas Star Wars | December 25, 1981 | Dallas, Texas | Reunion Arena | 14-man, two-ring battle royal | |
(c) refers to the champion(s) heading into the match

== World Class Championship Wrestling ==
| Event | Date | City | Venue | Main Event | Ref(s) |
|---|---|---|---|---|---|
| Star Wars | March 15, 1982 | Ft. Worth, Texas | The Convention Center | Kevin and Kerry Von Erich vs. Gary Hart and King Kong Bundy in a "Texas Death" steel cage match | |
| Fritz Von Erich Retirement Show | June 4, 1982 | Irving, Texas | Texas Stadium | Fritz Von Erich vs. King Kong Bundy (c) for the NWA American Heavyweight Championship | |
| Star Wars | August 15, 1982 | Dallas, Texas | The Convention Center | Ric Flair (c) vs. Kerry Von Erich for the NWA World Heavyweight Championship | |
| Christmas Star Wars | December 25, 1982 | Dallas, Texas | Reunion Arena | Ric Flair (c) vs. Kerry Von Erich in a steel cage match for the NWA World Heavyweight Championship | |
| Star Wars | June 17, 1983 | Dallas, Texas | Reunion Arena | The Fabulous Freebirds (Michael Hayes and Terry Gordy) (c) vs Kerry Von Erich and Bruiser Brody for the WCCW American Tag Team Championship | |
| Independence Day Star Wars | July 4, 1983 | Dallas, Texas | Reunion Arena | Kerry, Kevin, and David Von Erich vs. The Fabulous Freebirds (Michael Hayes, Terry Gordy and Buddy Roberts) | |
| Labor Day Star Wars | September 5, 1983 | Ft. Worth, Texas | The Convention Center | The Fabulous Freebirds (Michael Hayes, Terry Gordy and Buddy Roberts) (c) vs. Kerry, Kevin, and David Von Erich for the WCCW World Six-Man Tag Team Championship | |
| Thanksgiving Star Wars | November 24, 1983 | Dallas, Texas | Reunion Arena | Kerry Von Erich vs. Michael Hayes in a "loser leaves town" steel cage match | |
| Christmas Star Wars | December 25, 1983 | Dallas, Texas | Reunion Arena | Kevin and Mike Von Erich vs. The Fabulous Freebirds (Terry Gordy and Buddy Roberts in a No disqualification, loser leaves town match | |
| Star Wars | January 30, 1984 | Dallas, Texas | Reunion Arena | Jimmy Garvin (c) vs Chris Adams for the WCCW American Championship | |
| 1st Von Erich Memorial Parade of Champions | May 6, 1984 | Irving, Texas | Texas Stadium | Ric Flair (c) vs. Kerry Von Erich in a singles match for the NWA World Heavyweight Championship | |
| Independence Day Star Wars | July 4, 1984 | Ft. Worth, Texas | The Convention Center | Chris Adams and Stella Mae French vs Jimmy Garvin and Precious in a "loser leaves town" steel cage match | |
| Labor Day Star Wars | September 3, 1984 | Ft. Worth, Texas | The Convention Center | The Freebirds (Michael Hayes, Terry Gordy and Buddy Roberts) (c) vs Kerry and Kevin Von Erich in a handicap steel cage loser leaves town elimination for the WCCW World Six-Man Tag Team Championship | |
| Cotton Bowl Extravaganza | October 27, 1984 | Dallas, Texas | Cotton Bowl | Kerry, Kevin and Mike Von Erich vs. Chris Adams, Gino Hernandez, and Jake Roberts for the WCCW World Six-Man Tag Team Championship | |
| Thanksgiving Star Wars | November 22, 1984 | Dallas, Texas | Reunion Arena | Chris Adams vs Kevin Von Erich in a No Disqualification match | |
| Christmas Star Wars | December 25, 1984 | Dallas, Texas | Reunion Arena | Ric Flair (c) vs. Kerry Von Erich for the NWA World Heavyweight Championship | |
| Star Wars | January 28, 1985 | Ft. Worth, Texas | The Convention Center | Mike, Kevin, and Kerry Von Erich vs Chris Adams, Gino Hernandez, and Jake Roberts | |
| 2nd Von Erich Memorial Parade of Champions | May 5, 1985 | Irving, Texas | Texas Stadium | Kerry Von Erich (with Fritz Von Erich) vs. One Man Gang (with Gary Hart), in a Hair vs. One Man Gang facing Fritz Von Erich match | |
| Independence Day Star Wars | July 4, 1985 | Ft. Worth, Texas | The Convention Center | The Dynamic Duo (Chris Adams and Gino Hernandez) vs. Kerry and Kevin Von Erich | |
| Labor Day Star Wars | September 2, 1985 | Ft. Worth, Texas | The Convention Center | One Man Gang, Mark Lewin, and Jack Victory (c) vs. Brian Adias, Kerry and Kevin Von Erich for the WCCW World Six-Man Tag Team Championship | |
| Cotton Bowl Extravaganza | October 6, 1985 | Dallas, Texas | Cotton Bowl | Kerry and Kevin Von Erich vs. The Dynamic Duo (Chris Adams and Gino Hernandez) in a Hair vs. Hair match | |
| Thanksgiving Star Wars | November 28, 1985 | Dallas, Texas | Reunion Arena | The Dynamic Duo (Chris Adams and Gino Hernandez) vs Kerry and Kevin Von Erich in a Steel cage match for the vacant WCCW American Tag Team Championship | |
| Christmas Star Wars | December 25, 1985 | Dallas, Texas | Reunion Arena | Kerry, Kevin, and Lance Von Erich vs The Fabulous Freebirds (Michael Hayes, Terry Gordy and Buddy Roberts) | |
(c) refers to the champion(s) heading into the match

== World Class Wrestling Association ==
| Event | Date | City | Venue | Main Event | Ref(s) |
|---|---|---|---|---|---|
| Star Wars | January 26, 1986 | Ft. Worth, Texas | The Convention Center | Bruiser Brody vs One Man Gang in a steel cage chain match | |
| 3rd Von Erich Memorial Parade of Champions | May 4, 1986 | Irving, Texas | Texas Stadium | Fabulous Freebirds (Michael Hayes, Terry Gordy and Buddy Roberts) (c) vs. Steve Simpson, Kerry Von Erich and Lance Von Erich in a Lumberjack elimination match for the WCWA World Six-Man Tag Team Championship | |
| Independence Day Star Wars | July 4, 1986 | Dallas, Texas | Reunion Arena | Kevin, Mike and Lance Von Erich (C) vs. Butch Reed, Buzz Sawyer and Matt Borne for the WCWA World Six-Man Tag Team Championship | |
| Labor Day Star Wars | September 1, 1986 | Ft. Worth, Texas | The Convention Center | Tournament for the vacant WCWA World Tag Team Championship | |
| Cotton Bowl Extravaganza | October 12, 1986 | Dallas, Texas | Cotton Bowl | Bruiser Brody defeated Abdullah the Butcher in a steel cage match || | |
| Thanksgiving Star Wars | November 27, 1986 | Dallas, Texas | Reunion Arena | Fritz Von Erich vs Abdullah the Butcher | |
| Christmas Star Wars | December 25, 1986 | Dallas, Texas | Reunion Arena | Abdullah the Butcher vs Bruiser Brody in a Loser leaves town steel cage match | |
| Star Wars | February 2, 1987 | Ft. Worth, Texas | The Convention Center | Kerry Von Erich vs. Brian Adias | |
| 4th Von Erich Memorial Parade of Champions | May 3, 1987 | Irving, Texas | Texas Stadium | Kevin Von Erich (c) vs. Nord the Barbarian in a singles match for the WCWA World Heavyweight Championship | |
| Labor Day Star Wars | September 7, 1987 | Ft. Worth, Texas | The Convention Center | Al Perez (c) vs Kevin Von Erich for the WCWA World Heavyweight Championship | |
| Cotton Bowl Extravaganza | October 17, 1987 | Dallas, Texas | Cotton Bowl | Al Perez (c) vs. Kevin Von Erich in a singles match for the WCWA World Heavyweight Championship | |
| Thanksgiving Star Wars | November 26, 1987 | Dallas, Texas | Reunion Arena | Kerry Von Erich vs Al Perez | |
| Christmas Star Wars | December 25, 1987 | Dallas, Texas | Reunion Arena | Al Perez (c) vs Kerry Von Erich in a Steel cage match for the WCWA World Heavyweight Championship | |
| 5th Von Erich Memorial Parade of Champions | May 8, 1988 | Irving, Texas | Texas Stadium | Iceman Parsons (c) vs. Kerry Von Erich in a singles match for the WCWA World Heavyweight Championship | |
| Cotton Bowl Extravaganza | October 15, 1988 | Dallas, Texas | Cotton Bowl | Kerry Von Erich (c - WCWA) vs. Jerry Lawler (c - AWA) WCWA World Heavyweight Championship vs. AWA World Heavyweight Championship Texas Death match | |
| Star Wars | January 27, 1989 | Dallas, Texas | Dallas Sportatorium | Kerry Von Erich vs. Master of Pain | |
| Star Wars | March 12, 1989 | Dallas, Texas | Will Rogers Coliseum | Robert Fuller and Jimmy Golden (c) vs Kerry Von Erich and Jeff Jarrett for the WCWA World Tag Team Championship | |
(c) refers to the champion(s) heading into the match
