= Wrestling Star Wars =

Professional wrestling show series

Wrestling Star Wars, also billed as BTW Star Wars, WCCW Star Wars and WCWA Star Wars was a series of professional wrestling supercard shows promoted by the Dallas, Texas based World Class Championship Wrestling (WCCW) from 1981 until 1988. From 1961 to 1981 the promotion was known as Big Time Wrestling (BTW) and World Class Wrestling Association (WCWA) from 1986 until 1989. WCCW held multiple Star Wars shows throughout the year, especially on or close to Independence Day, Labor Day, Thanksgiving and Christmas. None of the shows were broadcast live, but were instead taped for WCCW's weekly TV shows where several of the matches would air.

== Dates, venues, and main events ==
Event	Date	City	Venue	Main Event	Ref(s)
Star Wars	June 4, 1981	Dallas, Texas	Reunion Arena	Bruiser Brody vs. The Great Kabuki	
Star Wars	October 25, 1981	Dallas, Texas	Reunion Arena	Al Madril (c) vs Bill Irwin for the NWA Texas Heavyweight Championship	
Christmas Star Wars	December 25, 1981	Dallas, Texas	Reunion Arena	14-man, two-ring battle royal	
Star Wars	March 15, 1982	Dallas, Texas	The Convention Center	Kevin and Kerry Von Erich vs. Gary Hart and King Kong Bundy in a "Texas Death" steel cage match	
Star Wars	August 15, 1982	Dallas, Texas	The Convention Center	Ric Flair (c) s. Kerry Von Erich for the NWA World Heavyweight Championship	
Christmas Star Wars	December 25, 1982	Dallas, Texas	Reunion Arena	Ric Flair (c) vs. Kerry Von Erich in a steel cage match for the NWA World Heavyweight Championship	
Star Wars	June 17, 1983	Dallas, Texas	Reunion Arena	The Fabulous Freebirds (Michael Hayes and Terry Gordy) (c) vs Kerry Von Erich and Bruiser Brody for the WCCW American Tag Team Championship	
Independence Day Star Wars	July 4, 1983	Dallas, Texas	Reunion Arena	Kerry, Kevin, and David Von Erich vs. The Fabulous Freebirds (Michael Hayes, Terry Gordy and Buddy Roberts)	
Labor Day Star Wars	September 5, 1983	Ft. Worth, Texas	The Convention Center	The Fabulous Freebirds (Michael Hayes, Terry Gordy and Buddy Roberts) (c) vs. Kerry, Kevin, and David Von Erich for the WCCW World Six-Man Tag Team Championship	
Thanksgiving Star Wars	November 24, 1983	Dallas, Texas	Reunion Arena	Kerry Von Erich vs. Michael Hayes in a "loser leaves town" steel cage match	
Christmas Star Wars	December 25, 1983	Dallas, Texas	Reunion Arena	Kevin and Mike Von Erich vs. The Fabulous Freebirds (Terry Gordy and Buddy Roberts in a No disqualification, loser leaves town match	
Star Wars	January 30, 1984	Dallas, Texas	Reunion Arena	Jimmy Garvin (c) vs Chris Adams for the WCCW American Championship	
Independence Day Star Wars	July 4, 1984	Ft. Worth, Texas	The Convention Center	Chris Adams and Stella Mae French vs Jimmy Garvin and Precious in a "loser leaves town" steel cage match	
Labor Day Star Wars	September 3, 1984	Ft. Worth, Texas	The Convention Center	The Freebirds (Michael Hayes, Terry Gordy and Buddy Roberts) (c) vs Kerry and Kevin Von Erich in a handicap steel cage loser leaves town elimination for the WCCW World Six-man Tag Team Championship	
Thanksgiving Star Wars	November 22, 1984	Dallas, Texas	Reunion Arena	Chris Adams vs Kevin Von Erich in a No Disqualification match	
Christmas Star Wars	December 25, 1984	Dallas, Texas	Reunion Arena	Ric Flair (c) vs. Kerry Von Erich for the NWA World Heavyweight Championship	
Star Wars	January 28, 1985	Ft. Worth, Texas	The Convention Center	Mike, Kevin, and Kerry Von Erich vs Chris Adams, Gino Hernandez, and Jake Roberts	
Independence Day Star Wars	July 4, 1985	Ft. Worth, Texas	The Convention Center	The Dynamic Duo (Chris Adams and Gino Hernandez) vs. Kerry and Kevin Von Erich	
Labor Day Star Wars	September 2, 1985	Ft. Worth, Texas	The Convention Center	One Man Gang, Mark Lewin, and Jack Victory (c) vs. Brian Adias, Kerry and Kevin Von Erich for the WCCW World Six-Man Tag Team Championship	
Thanksgiving Star Wars	November 28, 1985	Dallas, Texas	Reunion Arena	The Dynamic Duo (Chris Adams and Gino Hernandez) vs Kerry and Kevin Von Erich in a Steel cage match for the vacant WCCW American Tag Team Championship	
Christmas Star Wars	December 25, 1985	Dallas, Texas	Reunion Arena	Kerry, Kevin, and Lance Von Erich vs The Fabulous Freebirds (Michael Hayes, Terry Gordy and Buddy Roberts)	
Star Wars	January 26, 1986	Ft. Worth, Texas	The Convention Center	Bruiser Brody vs One Man Gang in a steel cage chain match	
Independence Day Star Wars	July 4, 1986	Dallas, Texas	Reunion Arena	Kevin, Mike and Lance Von Erich (C) vs. Butch Reed, Buzz Sawyer and Matt Borne for the WCWA World Six-Man Tag Team Championship	
Labor Day Star Wars	September 1, 1986	Ft. Worth, Texas	The Convention Center	Tournament for the vacant WCWA World Tag Team Championship	
Thanksgiving Star Wars	November 27, 1986	Dallas, Texas	Reunion Arena	Fritz Von Erich vs Abdullah the Butcher	
Christmas Star Wars	December 25, 1986	Dallas, Texas	Reunion Arena	Abdullah the Butcher vs Bruiser Brody in a Loser leaves town steel cage match	
Star Wars	February 2, 1987	Ft. Worth, Texas	The Convention Center	Kerry Von Erich vs. Brian Adias	
Labor Day Star Wars	September 7, 1987	Ft. Worth, Texas	The Convention Center	Al Perez (c) vs Kevin Von Erich for the WCWA World Heavyweight Championship	
Thanksgiving Star Wars	November 26, 1987	Dallas, Texas	Reunion Arena	Kerry Von Erich vs Al Perez	
Christmas Star Wars	December 25, 1987	Dallas, Texas	Reunion Arena	Al Perez (c) vs Kerry Von Erich in a Steel cage match for the WCWA World Heavyweight Championship	
Star Wars	January 27, 1989	Dallas, Texas	Dallas Sportatorium	Kerry Von Erich vs. Master of Pain	
Star Wars	March 12, 1989	Dallas, Texas	Will Rogers Coliseum	Robert Fuller and Jimmy Golden (c) vs Kerry Von Erich and Jeff Jarrett for the WCWA World Tag Team Championship	
