= WCCW Star Wars (1982) =

Professional wrestling show series

World Class Championship Wrestling (WCCW), based out of Dallas, Texas held a number of major professional wrestling super shows under the name Wrestling Star Wars between 1981 and 1989, with three of these being held in 1982. Promoter Fritz Von Erich held two "Wrestling Star Wars" events, one in March and one in August as well as a special "Christmas Star Wars" on December 25 of that year. The driving storyline behind both the second and third Star Wars show of 1982 was Von Erich's son Kerry Von Erich's quest to defeat Ric Flair for the NWA World Heavyweight Championship, a quest that was ultimately unsuccessful due to the Fabulous Freebirds turning on the Von Erich family, starting the most well known storyline in WCCW as the Von Erichs and the Freebirds fought for years following the December Christmas Star Wars.

== Wrestling Star Wars (March) ==
WCCW Wrestling Star Wars
- Promotion: World Class Championship Wrestling
- Date: March 15, 1982
- City: Ft. Worth, Texas
- Venue: The Convention Center

Event chronology
← Previous; Christmas Star Wars	Next → Fritz Von Erich Retirement Show

WCCW Star Wars chronology
← Previous; Christmas	Next → August 1982

Wrestling Star Wars (March 1982) was a professional wrestling supercard show that was held on March 15, 1982 The show was produced and scripted by the Dallas, Texas based World Class Championship Wrestling (WCCW) professional wrestling promotion and held in their home area, Dallas/Ft. Worth, Texas. Several matches from the show were taped for WCCW's television shows and broadcast in the weeks following the show. The show was the fourth overall show in the "Wrestling Star Wars" event chronology. The show was held at the Fort Worth Convention Center.

=== Results ===
No.	Results	Stipulations
1	Tom Shaft defeated Carlos Zapata	Singles match
2	Jose Lothario vs. Arman Hussein ended in a time-limit draw	Singles match
3	Al Madril defeated Bill Irwin by disqualification	Singles match
4	Bugsy McGraw defeated The Spoiler	Singles match
5	Bill Irwin defeated Frank Dusek	Singles match
6	Fritz Von Erich defeated The Great Kabuki	Singles match
7	Kevin and Kerry Von Erich vs. Gary Hart and King Kong Bundy ended in a double disqualification	"Texas Death" steel cage match

== Wrestling Star Wars (August) ==
WCCW Wrestling Star Wars
- Promotion: World Class Championship Wrestling
- Date: August 15, 1982
- City: Dallas, Texas
- Venue: Reunion Arena
- Attendance: 18,000

Event chronology
← Previous; Fritz Von Erich Retirement Show	Next → Christmas Star Wars

WCCW Star Wars chronology
← Previous; March 1982	Next → Christmas

Wrestling Star Wars (August 1982) was a professional wrestling supercard show that was held on August 15, 1982. The show was produced and scripted by the Dallas, Texas based World Class Championship Wrestling (WCCW) professional wrestling promotion and held in their home area, Dallas/Ft. Worth, Texas. Several matches from the show were taped for WCCW's television shows and broadcast in the weeks following the show. The show was the fifth overall show in the "Wrestling Star Wars" event chronology. The show, held at Reunion Arena, drew 18,000 spectators.

The main event of the show was National Wrestling Alliance (NWA) World Heavyweight Champion Ric Flair defending the championship against Kerry Von Erich in a "Best two-out-of-three" falls match. Flair won the first fall on a DQ after Kerry accidentally hit special appointed NWA referee Alfred Neely with a discus punch, while Von Erich won the second fall by pinfall with the Iron Claw. In the third and final fall Ric Flair and Kerry Von Erich battled to a Double Disqualification.

=== Results ===
No.	Results	Stipulations
1	Jose Lothario defeated Frank Dusek	Singles match
2	The Superfly defeated Brian Adias	Singles match
3	Al Madril defeated Bill Irwin	Singles match
4	Lola Gonzales defeated La Pantera Sureña	Singles match
5	Bugsy McGraw defeated Gary Hart and Armand Hussein	2-on-1 Handicap Match
6	Kevin and David Von Erich defeated The Great Kabuki and Magic Dragon (c)	Tag Team match for the WCCW All-Asian Tag Team Championship
7	King Kong Bundy (c) vs. Harley Race ended in a double disqualification	Singles match for the NWA American Heavyweight Championship
8	Ric Flair (c) vs. Kerry Von Erich ended in a draw They each had one win before being double disqualified in the third fall.	Best two-out-of-three falls match for the NWA World Heavyweight Championship
(c) / – the champion(s) heading into the match

== Christmas Star Wars ==
Christmas Star Wars
- Promotion: World Class Championship Wrestling
- Date: December 25, 1982 (aired December 27 and December 28, 1982)
- City: Dallas, Texas
- Venue: Reunion Arena
- Attendance: 12,000

WCCW Star Wars chronology
← Previous; August 1982	Next → June 1983

World Class Championship Wrestling (WCCW) held their second annual Christmas Star Wars, a major professional wrestling show held on December 25 each year from 1981 through 1987. Some of the matches on the show were taped and later shown on television as part of WCCW's weekly shows. The focal point of the show was promoter Fritz Von Erich's son Kerry Von Erich challenging Ric Flair for the NWA World Heavyweight Championship in the main event. The fifth and the eight match of the night were both shown on WCCW television programs on December 27, 1982 and the main event match between Von Erich and Flair was the focus of the WCCW television show on December 28, 1982. These episodes were later made available as part of the WWE Network. One of the undercard matches was a six-man tag team match to determine the first ever holders of the WCCW Six-Man Tag Team Championship as the team of the Fabulous Freebirds (Michael Hayes, Terry Gordy and Buddy Roberts) were slated to take on the team of Tom Steele Mike and Ben Sharpe representing Canada in the tournament. Prior to the match Michael Hayes announced that due to bad winter weather Buddy Roberts was not in the building. Following that announcement David Von Erich came to the ring and offered to team with the Freebirds. Von Erich and the Freebirds won the match and the championship, after which Von Erich relinquished his part of the championship to Buddy Roberts. The final match of the show was actually shown on TV before WCCW showed the match between Ric Flair and Kerry Von Erich, allowing them to dedicate the entire December 28 episode to the match between Ric Flair and Kerry Von Erich. At the August Wrestling Star Wars Ric Flair had managed to escape the match against Kerry Von Erich with the championship still in his possession. Following that show the storyline was that Ric Flair had offered a bounty to anyone who could injure Kerry Von Erich. The Great Kabuki collected the bounty as he hurt Von Erich's knee, giving them a storyline reason to cover for Von Erich's legitimate knee surgery. The Championship rematch was made into a Steel Cage Match and Fritz Von Erich decided to add a special guest referee to ensure everything was handled fairly. WCCW held a write in vote to determine the referee with the fans choosing Fabulous Freebird member Michael Hayes for the job alongside regular referee David Manning. After the introductions Terry Gordy came to ring side to hold the key that locked the steel cage door, to ensure that no one could get in and attack Von Erich who was a close friend of the Freebirds. During the match Von Erich applied the Iron Claw to Flair and held it for several minutes. During the hold Hayes thought that Flair had his foot under the bottom rope, a call that David Manning disagreed with, but Hayes made Von Erich break the claw hold anyway. Once he realized what he had done Hayes appeared to be upset and struck Ric Flair, knocking him down. When Hayes urged Von Erich to pin Flair Von Erich refused, which upset Hayes greatly. This led to Hayes leaving the cage while Von Erich tried to stop him. Moments later Terry Gordy slammed the door shut on Kerry Von Erich, striking him in the face and cementing that the Freebirds had just turned on their long time friend. Hayes returned moments later and counted Von Erich's shoulders down even though he clearly kicked out at 2. Subsequently David Manning ejected the Freebirds and announced that the match was not over. Minutes later Manning had no choice but to call for the bell as a bloodied Kerry Von Erich was unable to continue. The circumstances around the match was the start of the storyline feud between the Freebirds and the Von Erich family that would last for several years and has been the focal point of several DVD features such as "Heroes of World Class Wrestling: the Story of the Von Erichs" in 2007 and "The Triumph and Tragedy of World Class Championship Wrestling" released in 2011.

No.	Results	Stipulations	Times
1	Brian Adias defeated Frank Dusek	Singles match	09:23
2	Lone Eagle defeated Little Tokyo	Singles match	11:05
3	Jose Lothario and Al Madril defeated Magic Dragon and The Checkmate	Tag team match	14:06
4	David Von Erich (c) defeated Bill Irwin	Singles match for the NWA Texas Heavyweight Championship	09:57
5	David Von Erich and the Fabulous Freebirds (Michael Hayes and Terry Gordy) defeated Tom Steele, Mike and Ben Sharpe	Six-man tag team match for the inaugural NWA World Six-Man Tag Team Championship (Texas version)	18:21
6	Kevin Von Erich (c) defeated King Kong Bundy by disqualification	Singles match for the NWA American Heavyweight Championship	07:30
7	Ric Flair (c) defeated Kerry Von Erich	No Disqualification Steel Cage match for the NWA World Heavyweight Championship	18:43
8	Ken Mantel defeated the Spoiler, Checkmate, Frank Dusek, Ben Sharpe, Tom Steele, King Kong Bundy, "Wild" Bill Irwin, Mike Sharpe, Bugsy McGraw, Al Madril, Jose Lothario, David Von Erich, Brian Adias, and Magic Dragon.	$10,000 on a pole battle royal	11:06
(c) / – the champion(s) heading into the match

Battle Royal order of elimination

#	Eliminated	Way of elimination	Reference
1	David Von Erich	Over the top rope	
2	King Kong Bundy	Over the top rope	
3	Ben Sharpe	Pinned	
4	Jose Lothario	Over the top rope	
5	The Checkmate	Over the top rope	
6	Frank Dusek	Over the top rope	
7	The Spoiler	Over the top rope	
8	Bill Irwing	Over the top rope	
9	Bugsy McGraw	Over the top rope	
10	Magic Dragon	Pinned	
11	Bob Steel	Over the top rope	
12	Al Madrill	Over the top rope	
13	Brian Adias, Johnny Mantell and Mike Sharpe	Survivors	
