= WCCW Star Wars (1983) =

Professional wrestling show series

World Class Championship Wrestling (WCCW), based out of Dallas, Texas held a number of major professional wrestling super shows under the name 'Wrestling Star Wars between 1981 and 1989, with three of these being held in 1983. Promoter Fritz Von Erich held five "Wrestling Star Wars" events, one in March, one in August as well as a special Star Wars show for Independence Day, Thanksgiving and Christmas.

== Wrestling Star Wars (June) ==
Wrestling Star Wars (June 1983)
- Promotion: World Class Championship Wrestling
- Date: June 17, 1983
- City: Dallas, Texas
- Venue: Reunion Arena
- Attendance: 21,000

WCCW Star Wars chronology
← Previous; Christmas	Next → Independence Day

Wrestling Star Wars (June 1983) was a professional wrestling supercard show that was held on June 17, 1983. The show was produced and scripted by the Dallas, Texas-based World Class Championship Wrestling (WCCW) professional wrestling promotion and held in their home area, the Dallas, Texas. Several matches from the show were taped for WCCW's television shows and broadcast in the weeks following the show. The show was the seventh overall show in the "Wrestling Star Wars" event chronology. The show, held at the Reunion Arena, drew 21,000 spectators, announced as a full sellout.

=== Results ===
No.	Results	Stipulations	Times
1	Genichiro Tenryu defeated Johnny Mantell	Singles match	11:35
2	Vicki Carranza defeated Lola Gonzales (c)	Singles match for the Mexican National Women's Championship	11:10
3	José Lothario, Chris Adams, and Chavo Guerrero defeated Bill Irwin, Fishman, and The Mongol	Six-man tag team match	07:03
4	Buddy Roberts defeated Iceman Parsons	"hair vs. hair" match	08:10
5	David Von Erich defeated Jimmy Garvin by disqualification	Singles match, if Von Erich won then Garvin and Sunshine would be his valets for a day.	11:29
6	Jumbo Tsuruta (c) defeated Ted DiBiase	Singles match for the NWA United National Championship	14:07
7	Giant Baba (c) defeated King Kong Bundy	Singles match for the PWF World Heavyweight Championship	05:24
8	Kimala defeated Armand Hussein, Tola Yatsu, and Mike Bond	3-on-1 loser leaves town match	03:39
9	Harley Race (c) defeated Kevin Von Erich by disqualification	Singles match for the NWA World Heavyweight Championship	13:22
10	Kerry Von Erich and Bruiser Brody defeated The Fabulous Freebirds (Michael Hayes and Terry Gordy) (c)	Tag team match for the WCCW American Tag Team Championship	11:14
(c) / – the champion(s) heading into the match

== Independence Day Star Wars ==
Independence Day Star Wars (1983)
- Promotion: World Class Championship Wrestling
- Date: July 4, 1983
- City: Ft. Worth, Texas
- Venue: The Convention Center
- Attendance: 12,000

WCCW Star Wars chronology
← Previous; June 1983	Next → Labor Day

Independence Day Star Wars (1983) was a professional wrestling supercard show that was held on July 4, 1983. The show was produced and scripted by the Dallas, Texas-based World Class Championship Wrestling (WCCW) professional wrestling promotion and held in their home area, Dallas/Ft. Worth, Texas. Several matches from the show were taped for WCCW's television shows and broadcast in the weeks following the show. The show was the eighth overall show in the "Wrestling Star Wars" event chronology. The show, held at the Fort Worth Convention Center, drew 12,000 spectators out if its estimated 18,000 seat capacity when configured for professional wrestling shows.

=== Results ===
No.	Results	Stipulations	Times
1	Michael Hayes defeated Iceman Parsons	"lights out" match	—
2	Bruiser Brody vs. Kimala ended in a double disqualification	Singles match	04:00
3	David Von Erich defeated Jimmy Garvin	Singles match for the vacant WCCW Texas Heavyweight Championship	—
4	Kerry, Kevin, and David Von Erich defeated The Fabulous Freebirds (Michael Hayes, Terry Gordy and Buddy Roberts)	Best two-out-of-three falls Six-man tag team match	—

== Labor Day Star Wars ==
Labor Day Star Wars (1983)
- Promotion: World Class Championship Wrestling
- Date: September 5, 1983
- City: Ft. Worth, Texas
- Venue: The Convention Center
- Attendance: 11,573

WCCW Star Wars chronology
← Previous; Independence Day	Next → Thanksgiving

Labor Day Star Wars (1983) was a professional wrestling supercard show that was held on September 5, 1983. The show was produced and scripted by the Dallas, Texas-based World Class Championship Wrestling (WCCW) professional wrestling promotion and held in their home area, Dallas/Ft. Worth, Texas. Several matches from the show were taped for WCCW's television shows and broadcast in the weeks following the show. The show was the ninth overall show in the "Wrestling Star Wars" event chronology. The show, held at the Fort Worth Convention Center, drew 11,573 spectators out if its estimated 18,000 seat capacity when configured for professional wrestling shows.

=== Results ===
No.	Results	Stipulations	Times
1	Chris Adams defeated Mr. Ebony	Singles match	11:52
2	Kerry Von Erich defeated Michael Hayes	Country whipping match	06:13
3	David Von Erich (c) defeated Terry Gordy – two falls to one	Best two-out-of-three falls match for the WCCW Texas Heavyweight Championship	—
4	Kevin Von Erich defeated Jimmy Garvin (c) by disqualification	Singles match for the WCCW American Heavyweight Championship	11:23
5	Bruiser Brody defeated Kimala by disqualification	Lumberjack match	—
6	Johnny Mantell defeated The Mongol	Singles match	11:32
7	The Fabulous Freebirds (Michael Hayes, Terry Gordy and Buddy Roberts) (c) defeated Kerry, Kevin, and David Von Erich	Six-man tag team match for the WCCW World Six-Man Tag Team Championship	—
8	Iceman Parsons defeated Buddy Roberts	Singles match	—
(c) / – the champion(s) heading into the match

== Thanksgiving Star Wars ==
Thanksgiving Star Wars (1983)
- Promotion: World Class Championship Wrestling
- Date: November 24, 1983
- City: Dallas, Texas
- Venue: Reunion Arena
- Attendance: 18,500

WCCW Star Wars chronology
← Previous; Labor Day	Next → Christmas

Thanksgiving Star Wars (1983) was a professional wrestling supercard show that was held on November 24, 1983. The show was produced and scripted by the Dallas, Texas-based World Class Championship Wrestling (WCCW) professional wrestling promotion and held in their home area, Dallas, Texas. Several matches from the show were taped for WCCW's television shows and broadcast in the weeks following the show. The show was the tenth overall show in the "Wrestling Star Wars" event chronology. The show, held at the Reunion Arena, drew 18,500 spectators out of its approximately 21,000 seat capacity.

=== Results ===
No.	Results	Stipulations	Times
1	Johnny Mantell, Mike Reed, and José Lothario defeated Boris Zurcov, Black Gordman, and Tonga John	Six-man tag team match	—
2	The Missing Link defeated Buddy Roberts	Singles match	—
3	Kevin Von Erich defeated Terry Gordy	Singles match	—
4	David Von Erich (c) defeated Kimala by disqualification	Singles match for the WCCW Texas Heavyweight Championship	—
5	Mike Von Erich defeated Skandar Akbar	Singles match	04:00
6	The Super Destroyers (Super Destroyer I and Super Destroyer II) (c) vs. Junkyard Dog and Iceman Parsons ended in a draw	Tag team match for the WCCW American Tag Team Championship	—
7	Chris Adams defeated Jimmy Garvin (c)	Singles match for the WCCW American Heavyweight Championship	—
8	Kerry Von Erich defeated Michael Hayes	Loser Leaves Town steel cage match	—
(c) / – the champion(s) heading into the match

== Christmas Star Wars ==
Christmas Star Wars (1983)
- Promotion: World Class Championship Wrestling
- Date: December 25, 1983
- City: Dallas, Texas
- Venue: Reunion Arena
- Attendance: 19,675

WCCW Star Wars chronology
← Previous; Thanksgiving	Next → January 1984

Christmas Star Wars (1983) was a professional wrestling supercard show that was held on December 25, 1983. The show was produced and scripted by the Dallas, Texas-based World Class Championship Wrestling (WCCW) professional wrestling promotion and held in their home area, Dallas, Texas. Several matches from the show were taped for WCCW's television shows and broadcast in the weeks following the show. The show was the 11th overall show in the "Wrestling Star Wars" event chronology. The show, held at the Reunion Arena, drew 19,675 spectators out of its approximately 21,000 seat capacity.

=== Results ===
No.	Results	Stipulations	Times
1	The Missing Link defeated Johnny Mantell	Singles match	06:05
2	Iceman Parsons and Brian Adias defeated The Super Destroyers Super Destroyer I and Super Destroyer II) (c)	Tag team match for the WCCW American Tag Team Championship	15:35
3	Kerry Von Erich defeated Kimala by disqualification	Singles match	05:12
4	Mike Reed defeated The Mongol	Singles match	13:49
5	David Von Erich defeated Ric Flair (c) by disqualification	Singles match for the NWA World Heavyweight Championship	23:43
6	José Lothario defeated Black Gordman	Singles match	08:13
7	Kevin and Mike Von Erich defeated The Fabulous Freebirds (Terry Gordy and Buddy Roberts)	No disqualification, loser leaves town match	12:10
8	Jimmy Garvin defeated Chris Adams (c)	Singles match for the WCCW American Heavyweight Championship	14:58
(c) / – the champion(s) heading into the match
