= WCCW Star Wars (1985) =

Professional wrestling show series

World Class Championship Wrestling (WCCW), based out of Dallas, Texas held a number of major professional wrestling super shows under the name Wrestling Star Wars between 1981 and 1989, with five of these being held in 1985.

== Wrestling Star Wars (January) ==
Wrestling Star Wars (January 1985)
- Promotion: World Class Championship Wrestling
- Date: January 28, 1985
- City: Ft. Worth, Texas
- Venue: The Convention Center

Event chronology
← Previous; Christmas Star Wars 1984	Next → 2nd Von Erich Memorial Parade of Champions

WCCW Star Wars chronology
← Previous; Christmas	Next → Labor Day

Wrestling Star Wars (January 1985) was a professional wrestling supercard show that was held on January 28, 1985. The show was produced and scripted by the Dallas, Texas based World Class Championship Wrestling (WCCW) professional wrestling promotion and held in their home area, Dallas/Ft. Worth, Texas. Several matches from the show were taped for WCCW's television shows and broadcast in the weeks following the show. The show was the 17th overall show in the "Wrestling Star Wars" event chronology and held at the Fort Worth Convention Center, with an estimated 18,000 seat capacity when configured for professional wrestling shows.

=== Results ===
No.	Results	Stipulations
1	Billy Jack Haynes defeated Kelly Kiniski	Singles match
2	The Midnight Express (Bobby Eaton and Dennis Condrey) (c) (with Jim Cornette) defeated the Fantastics (Bobby Fulton and Tommy Rogers)	Tag team match for the NWA American Tag Team Championship
3	Kerry Von Erich defeated Kimala by disqualification	Singles match
4	One Man Gang defeated José Lothario	Singles match
5	Kevin Von Erich defeated Rip Oliver	Singles match
6	Chris Adams, Gino Hernandez, and Jake Roberts defeated The Fabulous Freebirds (Michael Hayes, Terry Gordy and Buddy Roberts)	Tag team match
7	Mike, Kevin, and Kerry Von Erich defeated Chris Adams, Gino Hernandez, and Jake Roberts	Six-man tag team match
(c) / – the champion(s) heading into the match

== Independence Day Star Wars ==
Independence Day Star Wars (1985)
- Promotion: World Class Championship Wrestling
- Date: July 4, 1985
- City: Ft. Worth, Texas
- Venue: The Convention Center
- Attendance: 13,000

Event chronology
← Previous; 2nd Von Erich Memorial Parade of Champions	Next → Labor Day Star Wars 1985

WCCW Star Wars chronology
← Previous; January 1985	Next → Labor Day

Independence Day Star Wars (1985) was a professional wrestling supercard show that was held on July 4, 1985. The show was produced and scripted by the Dallas, Texas based World Class Championship Wrestling (WCCW) professional wrestling promotion and held in their home area, Dallas/Ft. Worth, Texas. Several matches from the show were taped for WCCW's television shows and broadcast in the weeks following the show. The show was the 18th overall show in the "Wrestling Star Wars" event chronology. The show, held at the Fort Worth Convention Center, drew 13,000 spectators out if its estimated 18,000 seat capacity when configured for professional wrestling shows.

=== Results ===
No.	Results	Stipulations
1	Scott Casey defeated Jack Victory	Singles match
2	Brian Adias vs. Jim Powers ended in a no contest	Singles match
3	The Fantastics (Bobby Fulton and Tommy Rogers) defeated Rip Oliver and Kelly Kiniski – two falls to none	Best Two-out-of-three falls tag team match
4	Iceman Parsons defeated Killer Tim Brooks	Singles match
5	Kerry Von Erich defeated One Man Gang by knock out	Chicago death match
6	The Great Kabuki defeated Chris Adams	Singles match
7	Sunshine defeated Jim Cornette	Singles match, Cornette was blindfolded and had one arm tied behind his back
8	The Dynamic Duo (Chris Adams and Gino Hernandez) defeated Kerry and Kevin Von Erich	Tag team match

== Labor Day Star Wars ==
Labor Day Star Wars (1985)
- Promotion: World Class Championship Wrestling
- Date: September 2, 1985
- City: Ft. Worth, Texas
- Venue: The Convention Center
- Attendance: 8,000

Event chronology
← Previous; Independence Day Star Wars	Next → 2nd Cotton Bowl Extravaganza

WCCW Star Wars chronology
← Previous; Independence Day Star	Next → Thanksgiving

Labor Day Star Wars (1985) was a professional wrestling supercard show that was held on September 2, 1985. The show was produced and scripted by the Dallas, Texas based World Class Championship Wrestling (WCCW) professional wrestling promotion and held in their home area, Dallas/Ft. Worth, Texas. Several matches from the show were taped for WCCW's television shows and broadcast in the weeks following the show. The show was the 19th overall show in the "Wrestling Star Wars" event chronology. The show, held at the Fort Worth Convention Center, drew 8,000 spectators out if its estimated 18,000 seat capacity when configured for professional wrestling shows.

=== Results ===
No.	Results	Stipulations
1	Kelly Kiniski defeated Jim Powers	Singles match
2	John Tatum (c) defeated Scott Casey	Singles match for the WCCW Television Championship
3	Gino Hernandez defeated Brian Adias (c)	Singles match for the WCCW Texas Heavyweight Championship
4	Bruiser Brody defeated One Man Gang by disqualification	Singles match
5	Kevin Von Erich defeated Chris Adams	Singles match
6	Mark Lewin defeated Iceman Parsons	Singles match
7	Brian Adias, Kerry and Kevin Von Erich defeated One Man Gang, Mark Lewin, and Jack Victory (c)	Six-man tag team match for the WCCW World Six-Man Tag Team Championship
(c) / – the champion(s) heading into the match

== Thanksgiving Star Wars ==
Thanksgiving Star Wars (1985)
- Promotion: World Class Championship Wrestling
- Date: November 28, 1985
- City: Dallas, Texas
- Venue: Reunion Arena
- Attendance: 13,423

Event chronology
← Previous; 2nd Cotton Bowl Extravaganza	Next → Christmas Star Wars 1985

WCCW Star Wars chronology
← Previous; Labor Day	Next → Christmas

Thanksgiving Star Wars (1985) was a professional wrestling supercard show that was held on November 28, 1985. The show was produced and scripted by the Dallas, Texas based World Class Championship Wrestling (WCCW) professional wrestling promotion and held in their home area, Dallas, Texas. Several matches from the show were taped for WCCW's television shows and broadcast in the weeks following the show. The show was the 20th overall show in the "Wrestling Star Wars" event chronology. The show, held at the Reunion Arena drew 13,423 spectators out of its approximately 21,000 seat capacity.

=== Results ===
No.	Results	Stipulations	Times
1	The Missing Link and The Grappler defeated Dave Peterson and Johnny Mantell	Tag team match	—
2	Lance Von Erich defeated Killer Tim Brooks	Singles match	—
3	One Man Gang defeated Gary Hart	Singles match	0:50
4	One Man Gang vs. Kimala ended in a double countout	Singles match	—
5	Brian Adias (c) defeated Jack Victory	Singles match for the WCCW Texas Heavyweight Championship	—
6	Iceman Parsons defeated Rick Rude (c) by disqualification	Singles match for the WCCW American Heavyweight Championship	11:04
7	John Tatum defeated Scott Casey	Steel cage match	—
8	The Dynamic Duo (Chris Adams and Gino Hernandez) defeated Kerry and Kevin Von Erich	Steel cage match for the vacant WCCW American Tag Team Championship. Guest referees: Terry Gordy and Brian Adias	—
(c) / – the champion(s) heading into the match

== Christmas Star Wars ==
Christmas Star Wars (1985)
- Promotion: World Class Championship Wrestling
- Date: December 25, 1985
- City: Dallas, Texas
- Venue: Reunion Arena
- Attendance: 7,840

WCCW Star Wars chronology
← Previous; Thanksgiving	Next → January 1986

Christmas Star Wars (1985) was a professional wrestling supercard show that was held on December 25, 1985. The show was produced and scripted by the Dallas, Texas based World Class Championship Wrestling (WCCW) professional wrestling promotion and held in their home area, Dallas, Texas. Several matches from the show were taped for WCCW's television shows and broadcast in the weeks following the show. The show was the 21st overall show in the "Wrestling Star Wars" event chronology. The event, held at the Reunion Arena, drew 7,840 spectators out of its approximately 21,000 seat capacity.

=== Results ===
No.	Results	Stipulations
1	John Mantell defeated Tommy Montana	Singles match
2	Iceman Parsons and Brian Adias defeated Great Kabuki and The Grappler	Tag team match
3	Tatsumi Fujinami defeated Bob Sweetan	Singles match
4	Lance Von Erich defeated Rick Rude (c) by disqualification	Singles match for the WCCW American Championship
5	The Fabulous Freebirds (Terry Gordy and Buddy Roberts) defeated Mark Youngblood and Dave Peterson	Tag team match
6	The Missing Link defeated Jack Victory	Singles match
7	Kerry and Kevin Von Erich defeated the Dynamic Duo (Chris Adams and Gino Hernandez) (c) by disqualification	Tag team match for the WCCW American Tag Team Championship
8	Scott Casey and Sunshine defeated John Tatum and Missy Hyatt	Mixed tag team match
9	Antonio Inoki (c) defeated "Dr Death" Steve Williams	Singles match for the IWGP Heavyweight Championship
10	Bruiser Brody defeated One Man Gang	Chain match
11	Kerry, Kevin, and Lance Von Erich defeated The Fabulous Freebirds (Michael Hayes, Terry Gordy and Buddy Roberts)	Six-man tag team match
(c) / – the champion(s) heading into the match
