= WCWA Star Wars (1986) =

Professional wrestling show series

World Class Wrestling Association (WCWA), based out of Dallas, Texas held a number of major professional wrestling super shows under the name Wrestling Star Wars between 1981 and 1989, with five of these being held in 1986.

== Wrestling Star Wars (January) ==
Wrestling Star Wars (January 1986)
- Promotion: World Class Championship Wrestling
- Date: January 26, 1986
- City: Ft. Worth, Texas
- Venue: The Convention Center
- Attendance: 8,100

Event chronology
← Previous; Christmas Star Wars	Next → 3rd Von Erich Memorial Parade of Champions

WCWA Star Wars chronology
← Previous; Christmas	Next → Independence Day

Wrestling Star Wars (January 1986) was a professional wrestling supercard show that was held on January 26, 1986. The show was produced and scripted by the Dallas, Texas based World Class Championship Wrestling (WCCW) professional wrestling promotion and held in their home area, Dallas/Ft. Worth, Texas.

Several matches from the show were taped for WCCW's television shows and broadcast in the weeks following the show. The show was the 22nd overall show in the "Wrestling Star Wars" event chronology. The show, held at the Fort Worth Convention Center, drew 8,100 spectators out if its estimated 18,000 seat capacity when configured for professional wrestling shows.

=== Results ===
No.	Results	Stipulations
1	Jerry Allen defeated Tommy Montana	Singles match
2	Chris Adams defeated Gino Hernandez by disqualification	Singles match
3	Mark Youngblood defeated Jack Victory	Singles match
4	Iceman Parsons and The Missing Link defeated Rick Rude and The Grappler	Tag team match

== Independence Day Star Wars ==
Independence Day Star Wars (1986)
- Promotion: World Class Wrestling Association
- Date: July 4, 1986
- City: Dallas, Texas
- Venue: Reunion Arena
- Attendance: 11,500

Event chronology
← Previous; 3rd Von Erich Memorial Parade of Champions	Next → Labor Day Star Wars 1986

WCWA Star Wars chronology
← Previous; January 1986	Next → Labor Day

Independence Day Star Wars (1986) was a professional wrestling supercard show that was held on July 4, 1986. The show was produced and scripted by the Dallas, Texas based World Class Wrestling Association (WCWA) professional wrestling promotion and held in their home area, Dallas, Texas. Several matches from the show were taped for WCWA's television shows and broadcast in the weeks following the show. The show was the 23rd overall show in the "Wrestling Star Wars" event chronology, drawing 11,500 spectators at the Reunion Arena.

=== Results ===
No.	Results	Stipulations
1	Mark Youngblood defeated Jerry Allen	Singles match
2	The Grapplers (Grappler #1 and Grappler #2) defeated The Batten Twins (Brad and Bart Batten)	Tag team match
3	Buzz Sawyer defeated Brian Adias (c)	Singles match for the WCWA Texas Heavyweight Championship
4	Abdullah the Butcher (with Gary Hart) defeated The Great Kabuki (c)	Singles match for the WCWA Texas Brass Knuckles Championship
5	Sunshine defeated The Raven	Singles match
6	Steve Simpson defeated Killer Tim Brooks	Singles match
7	Bruiser Brody vs. Abdullah the Butcher (with Gary Hart) ended in a double disqualification	Singles match
8	Chris Adams defeated Rick Rude (c) (with Percy Pringle)	Singles match for the WCWA World Heavyweight Championship
9	Kevin, Mike and Lance Von Erich (C) defeated Butch Reed, Buzz Sawyer and Matt Borne	Six-man tag team match for the WCWA Six-Man Tag Team Championship
(c) / – the champion(s) heading into the match

== Labor Day Star Wars ==
Labor Day Star Wars (1986)
- Promotion: World Class Wrestling Association
- Date: September 1, 1986
- City: Ft. Worth, Texas
- Venue: The Convention Center
- Attendance: 5,000

Event chronology
← Previous; Independence Day Star Wars	Next → 3rd Cotton Bowl Extravaganza

WCWA Star Wars chronology
← Previous; Independence Day	Next → Thanksgiving

Labor Day Star Wars (1986) was a professional wrestling supercard show that was held on September 1, 1986. The show was produced and scripted by the Dallas, Texas based World Class Wrestling Association (WCWA) professional wrestling promotion and held in their home area, Dallas/Ft. Worth, Texas. Several matches from the show were taped for WCWA's television shows and broadcast in the weeks following the show. The show was the 24th overall show in the "Wrestling Star Wars" event chronology. The show, held at the Fort Worth Convention Center, drew 5,000 spectators out if its estimated 18,000 seat capacity when configured for professional wrestling shows.

=== Results ===
No.	Results	Stipulations
1	Abdullah the Butcher defeated Bruiser Brody by disqualification	WCCW American Tag Team Championship tournament bracket match
2	Chris Adams defeated Rick Rude by disqualification	Singles match
3	Buzz Sawyer and Matt Borne defeated Kevin and Mike Von Erich by count-out	WCWA World Tag Team Championship tournament, first round match
4	Kevin Sullivan and Mark Lewin defeated The Batten Twins (Brad and Bart Batten)	WCWA World Tag Team Championship tournament, first round match
5	Chris and Mark Youngblood defeated Rick Rude and Jos LeDuc by disqualification	WCWA World Tag Team Championship tournament, first round match
6	Dingo Warrior and Socko defeated Killer Tim Brooks and The Grappler	WCWA World Tag Team Championship tournament, first round match
7	Buzz Sawyer and Matt Borne defeated Kevin Sullivan and Mark Lewin	WCWA World Tag Team Championship tournament, quarter-final match
8	Chris and Mark Youngblood defeated Jerry and Ted Oates	WCWA World Tag Team Championship tournament, quarter-final match
9	The Dingo Warrior and Socko defeated Brian Adias and Scott Casey	WCWA World Tag Team Championship tournament, quarter-final match
10	Lance Von Erich and Chris Adams defeated The Dingo Warrior and Socko	WCWA World Tag Team Championship tournament, semifinal match
11	Buzz Sawyer and Matt Borne defeated Chris and Mark Youngblood.	WCWA World Tag Team Championship tournament, semifinal match
12	Buzz Sawyer and Matt Borne defeated Lance Von Erich and Chris Adams	WCWA World Tag Team Championship tournament, final match

== Thanksgiving Star Wars ==
Thanksgiving Star Wars (1986)
- Promotion: World Class Wrestling Association
- Date: November 27, 1986
- City: Dallas, Texas
- Venue: Reunion Arena
- Attendance: 6,000

Event chronology
← Previous; 3rd Cotton Bowl Extravaganza	Next → Christmas Star Wars

WCWA Star Wars chronology
← Previous; Labor Day	Next → Christmas

Thanksgiving Star Wars (1986) was a professional wrestling supercard show that was held on November 27, 1986. The show was produced and scripted by the Dallas, Texas based World Class Wrestling Association (WCWA) professional wrestling promotion and held in their home area, Dallas, Texas. Several matches from the show were taped for WCWA's television shows and broadcast in the weeks following the show. The show was the 25th overall show in the "Wrestling Star Wars" event chronology. The show, held at the Reunion Arena, drew 6,000 spectators out of its approximately 21,000 seat capacity.

=== Results ===
No.	Results	Stipulations	Times
1	Scott Casey defeated Killer Tim Brooks	Singles match	—
2	Crusher Yurkoff (c) vs. Steve Simpson ended in a time limit draw	Singles match for the WCWA Television Championship	15:00
3	Dingo Warrior defeated Master Gee	Chain match	—
4	Mike Von Erich defeated Brian Adias by disqualification	Singles match	—
5	Abdullah the Butcher defeated Tony Atlas by disqualification	Singles match	—
6	Kevin Von Erich (c) defeated Black Bart	Singles match for the WCWA World Heavyweight Championship	—
7	Lance and Mike Von Erich defeated Brian Adias and Matt Borne	Tag team match	—
8	Kevin Von Erich defeated Al Madril	"Lights Out" match	—
9	Fritz Von Erich defeated Abdullah the Butcher by disqualification	Submission match	—
(c) / – the champion(s) heading into the match

== Christmas Star Wars ==
Christmas Star Wars (1986)
- Promotion: World Class Wrestling Association
- Date: December 25, 1986
- City: Dallas, Texas
- Venue: Reunion Arena
- Attendance: 7,000

WCWA Star Wars chronology
← Previous; Thanksgiving	Next → February 1987

Christmas Star Wars (1986) was a professional wrestling supercard show that was held on December 25, 1986. The show was produced and scripted by the Dallas, Texas based World Class Wrestling Association (WCWA) professional wrestling promotion and held in their home area, Dallas, Texas. Several matches from the show were taped for WCWA's television shows and broadcast in the weeks following the show. The show was the 26th overall show in the "Wrestling Star Wars" event chronology. The show, held at the Reunion Arena, drew 7,000 spectators out of its approximately 21,000 seat capacity.

=== Results ===
No.	Results	Stipulations	Times
1	Mark Youngblood defeated Killer Tim Brooks	Singles match	—
2	Steve Simpson defeated The Grappler	Singles match	—
3	Lance Von Erich defeated Master Gee	Singles match	—
4	Dingo Warrior vs. Bob Bradley ended in a double disqualification	Singles match	—
5	Candi Divine defeated Lock	Singles match	—
6	Tony Atlas defeated Matt Borne	Singles match	—
7	Scott Casey defeated Black Bart	"Loser rides a mule" match	—
8	Kevin and Mike Von Erich defeated Brian Adias and Al Madril (c) by disqualification	Tag team match for the WCWA World Tag Team Championship	—
9	Abdullah the Butcher defeated Bruiser Brody	Loser leaves town steel cage match	13:47
(c) / – the champion(s) heading into the match
