= WCCW Star Wars (1984) =

Professional wrestling show series

World Class Championship Wrestling (WCCW) based out of Dallas, Texas held a number of major professional wrestling super shows under the name Wrestling Star Wars between 1981 and 1989, with five of these being held in 1984.

== Wrestling Star Wars (January) ==
Wrestling Star Wars (January 1984)
- Promotion: World Class Championship Wrestling
- Date: January 30, 1984
- City: Ft. Worth, Texas
- Venue: The Convention Center

WCCW Star Wars chronology
← Previous; Christmas	Next → Independence Day

Wrestling Star Wars (January 1984) was a professional wrestling supercard show that was held on January 30, 1984. The show was produced and scripted by the Dallas, Texas-based World Class Championship Wrestling (WCCW) professional wrestling promotion and held in their home area, Dallas/Ft. Worth, Texas. Several matches from the show were taped for WCCW's television shows and broadcast in the weeks following the show. The show was the 12th overall show in the "Wrestling Star Wars" event chronology. The show was held at the Fort Worth Convention Center, with an estimated 18,000 seat capacity when configured for professional wrestling shows.

=== Results ===
No.	Results	Stipulations	Times
1	Junkyard Dog defeated Kimala by disqualification	Singles match	—
2	The Super Destroyers (Super Destroyer I and Super Destroyer II) defeated Iceman Parsons and Brian Adias	Tag team match	—
3	The Fabulous Freebirds (Michael Hayes and Terry Gordy and Buddy Roberts defeated David, Kerry and Mike Von Erich	Tag team match	—
4	Ric Flair vs. Mike Von Erich ended in a time limit draw	Singles match	10:00
5	Chris Adams defeated Jimmy Garvin (c)	Singles match for the WCCW American Championship	—
(c) / – the champion(s) heading into the match

== Independence Day Star Wars ==
Independence Day Star Wars (1984)
- Promotion: World Class Championship Wrestling
- Date: July 4, 1984
- City: Ft. Worth, Texas
- Venue: The Convention Center
- Attendance: 12,721

Event chronology
← Previous; Wrestling Star Wars (January 1984)	Next → 1st Von Erich Memorial Parade of Champions

WCCW Star Wars chronology
← Previous; Wrestling Star Wars	Next → Labor Day

Independence Day Star Wars (1984) was a professional wrestling supercard show that was held on July 4, 1984. The show was produced and scripted by the Dallas, Texas-based World Class Championship Wrestling (WCCW) professional wrestling promotion and held in their home area, Dallas/Ft. Worth, Texas. Several matches from the show were taped for WCCW's television shows and broadcast in the weeks following the show. The show was the 13th overall show in the "Wrestling Star Wars" event chronology. The event, held at the Fort Worth Convention Center, drew 12,721 spectators out if its estimated 18,000 seat capacity when configured for professional wrestling shows.

=== Results ===
No.	Results	Stipulations
1	Killer Khan defeated Mike Reed	Singles match
2	Scott Irwin and The Missing Link defeated José Lothario and Buck Zumhofe	Tag team match
3	Gino Hernandez (c) defeated Jules Strongbow	Singles match for the WCCW American Championship
4	Kelly Kiniski defeated George Weingeroff	Singles match
5	The Fabulous Freebirds (Michael Hayes, Terry Gordy and Buddy Roberts) defeated Kerry, Kevin, and Mike Von Erich) (c)	Six-man tag team match for the WCCW World Six-Man Tag Team Championship
6	Iceman Parsons defeated Bill Irwin	Singles match for the WCCW American Tag Team Championship
7	Gino Hernandez won a battle royal	Check on a pole battle royal
8	Chris Adams and Stella Mae French defeated Jimmy Garvin and Precious	Loser leaves town steel cage match
(c) / – the champion(s) heading into the match

== Labor Day Star Wars ==
Labor Day Star Wars (1984)
- Promotion: World Class Championship Wrestling
- Date: September 3, 1984
- City: Ft. Worth, Texas
- Venue: The Convention Center
- Attendance: 10,000

Event chronology
← Previous; 1st Von Erich Memorial Parade of Champions	Next → 1st Cotton Bowl Extravaganza

WCCW Star Wars chronology
← Previous; Independence Day	Next → Thanksgiving

Labor Day Star Wars (1984) was a professional wrestling supercard show that was held on September 3, 1984. The show was produced and scripted by the Dallas, Texas-based World Class Championship Wrestling (WCCW) professional wrestling promotion and held in their home area, Dallas/Ft. Worth, Texas. Several matches from the show were taped for WCCW's television shows and broadcast in the weeks following the show. The show was the 14th overall show in the "Wrestling Star Wars" event chronology. The show, held at the Fort Worth Convention Center, drew 10,000 spectators out if its estimated 18,000 seat capacity when configured for professional wrestling shows.

=== Results ===
No.	Results	Stipulations
1	George Weingeroff defeated Kelly Kiniski	Singles match
2	Chris Adams defeated Jake Roberts (c)	Singles match for the WCCW Television Championship
3	Jules Strongbow and Buck Zumhofe defeated the Long Riders (Bill and Scott Irwin)	Tag team match
4	Michael Hayes defeated The Missing Link by disqualification	Singles match
5	Kerry Von Erich defeated Bruce Reed by disqualification	Arm wrestling match
6	Iceman Parsons and Skip Young defeated the PYT Express (Koko Ware and Norvell Austin) by disqualification	Tag team match
7	Gino Hernandez defeated Mike Von Erich (c)	Singles match for the WCCW American Championship
8	Killer Khan defeated Terry Gordy	No disqualification "spike" match
9	Kerry and Kevin Von Erich defeated The Freebirds (Michael Hayes, Terry Gordy and Buddy Roberts) (c)	Handicap (2 vs 3), steel cage, loser leaves town, elimination match for the WCCW World Six-Man Tag Team Championship
(c) / – the champion(s) heading into the match

== Thanksgiving Star Wars ==
Thanksgiving Star Wars (1984)
- Promotion: World Class Championship Wrestling
- Date: November 22, 1984
- City: Dallas, Texas
- Venue: Reunion Arena
- Attendance: 15,325

Event chronology
← Previous; 1st Cotton Bowl Extravaganza	Next → Christmas Star Wars

WCCW Star Wars chronology
← Previous; Labor Day	Next → Christmas

Thanksgiving Star Wars (1984) was a professional wrestling supercard show that was held on November 22, 1984. The show was produced and scripted by the Dallas, Texas-based World Class Championship Wrestling (WCCW) professional wrestling promotion and held in their home area, Dallas, Texas. Several matches from the show were taped for WCCW's television shows and broadcast in the weeks following the show. The show was the 15thoverall show in the "Wrestling Star Wars" event chronology. The show, held at the Reunion Arena, drew 15,325 spectators out of its approximately 21,000 seat capacity.

=== Results ===
No.	Results	Stipulations	Times
1	The Missing Link defeated Buck Zumhofe	Singles match	01:37
2	Stella Mae French defeated Nicola Roberts	Singles match	03:20
3	Chic Donovan defeated Skandar Akbar by disqualification	Singles match	08:25
4	Bobby Fulton defeated El Diablo Grande	Singles match	09:48
5	The Fantastics (Bobby Fulton and Tommy Rogers) (c) defeated the PYT Express (Koko Ware and Norvell Austin)	Tag team match for the WCCW American Tag Team Championship	14:51
6	Kerry Von Erich and Iceman Parsons defeated Jake Roberts and Kelly Kiniski	Tag team match	06:02
7	Mike Von Erich defeated Gino Hernandez (c) by disqualification	Singles match for the WCCW Texas Championship	—
8	Terry Gordy defeated Killer Khan	Texas death match, special guest referee Kerry Von Erich	16:00
9	Chris Adams defeated Kevin Von Erich	No disqualification match	08:00
(c) / – the champion(s) heading into the match

== Christmas Star Wars ==
Christmas Star Wars (1984)
- Promotion: World Class Championship Wrestling
- Date: December 25, 1984
- City: Dallas, Texas
- Venue: Reunion Arena
- Attendance: 20,000

WCCW Star Wars chronology
← Previous; Thanksgiving Star	Next → January 1985

Christmas Star Wars (1984) was a professional wrestling supercard show that was held on December 25, 1984. The show was produced and scripted by the Dallas, Texas-based World Class Championship Wrestling (WCCW) professional wrestling promotion and held in their home arna, Dallas, Texas. Several matches from the show were taped for WCCW's television shows and broadcast in the weeks following the show. The show was the 16th overall show in the "Wrestling Star Wars" event chronology. The show, held at the Reunion Arena, drew 20,000 spectators out of its approximately 21,000 seat capacity.

=== Results ===
No.	Results	Stipulations	Times
1	Kelly Kiniski defeated Buck Zumhofe	Singles match	—
2	Rip Oliver defeated Iceman Parsons	Singles match	08:28
3	José Lothario defeated El Diablo Grande	Singles match	10:19
4	The Fantastics (Bobby Fulton and Tommy Rogers) (c) defeated The Midnight Express (Bobby Eaton and Dennis Condrey)	Tag team match for the WCCW American Tag Team Championship	15:10
5	Kerry Von Erich defeated Ric Flair (c) by disqualification	Singles match for the NWA World Heavyweight Championship	18:20
6	Kevin Von Erich defeated Chris Adams	Lumberjack match	06:07
7	Terry Gordy, Buddy Roberts, and Chic Donovan defeated Skandar Akbar, The Missing Link, and Mr. X	loser leaves town elimination match	10:15
8	Mike Von Erich and Billy Jack defeated Gino Hernandez and Jake Roberts	Tag team match	03:38
(c) / – the champion(s) heading into the match
