= WCWA Star Wars (1987) =

Professional wrestling show series

World Class Wrestling Association (WCWA), based out of Dallas, Texas held a number of major professional wrestling super shows under the name Wrestling Star Wars between 1981 and 1989, with five of these being held in 1987.

== Wrestling Star Wars (February) ==
Wrestling Star Wars (February 1987)
- Promotion: World Class Wrestling Association
- Date: February 2, 1987
- City: Ft. Worth, Texas
- Venue: The Convention Center

Event chronology
← Previous; Christmas Star Wars	Next → 4th Von Erich Memorial Parade of Champions

WCWA Star Wars chronology
← Previous; Christmas	Next → Labor Day

Wrestling Star Wars (February 1987) was a professional wrestling supercard show that was held on February 2, 1987. The show was produced and scripted by the Dallas, Texas-based World Class Wrestling Association (WCWA) professional wrestling promotion and held in their home area, Dallas/Ft. Worth, Texas. Several matches from the show were taped for WCWA's television shows and broadcast in the weeks following the show. The show was the 27th overall show in the "Wrestling Star Wars" event chronology and was held at the Fort Worth Convention Center with an estimated 18,000 seat capacity when configured for professional wrestling shows.

=== Results ===
No.	Results	Stipulations
1	Steve Simpson defeated Roberto Soto	Singles match
2	Dingo Warrior defeated Bob Bradley (c)	Singles match for the WCWA Texas Heavyweight Championship
3	Matt Borne defeated Scott Casey	Singles match
4	Red River Jack defeated Killer Tim Brooks	Singles match
5	David Manning defeated Gary Hart	Singles match
6	Kevin Von Erich (c) defeated Al Madril	Singles match for the WCWA World Heavyweight Championship
7	Abdullah the Butcher defeated Tony Atlas via countout	Singles match
8	The Fantastics (Bobby Fulton and Tommy Rogers) vs. The Rock 'n' Roll RPMs (Tommy Lane and Mike Davis) ended in a double count-out	Tag team match
9	Kerry Von Erich defeated Brian Adias	Singles match
(c) / – the champion(s) heading into the match

== Labor Day Star Wars ==
Labor Day Star Wars (1987)
- Promotion: World Class Wrestling Association
- Date: September 7, 1987
- City: Fort Worth, Texas
- Venue: The Convention Center
- Attendance: 6,000

Event chronology
← Previous; 4th Von Erich Memorial Parade of Champions	Next → 4th Cotton Bowl Extravaganza

WCWA Star Wars chronology
← Previous; February 1987	Next → Thanksgiving

Labor Day Star Wars (1987) was a professional wrestling supercard show that was held on September 7, 1987. The show was produced and scripted by the Dallas, Texas-based World Class Wrestling Association (WCWA) professional wrestling promotion and held in their home area, Dallas/Ft. Worth, Texas. Several matches from the show were taped for WCWA's television shows and broadcast in the weeks following the show. The show was the 28th overall show in the "Wrestling Star Wars" event chronology. The show, held at the Fort Worth Convention Center, drew 6,000 spectators out if its estimated 18,000 seat capacity when configured for professional wrestling shows.

=== Results ===
No.	Results	Stipulations
1	The Spoiler defeated Tony Falk	Country whipping match
2	Vince Apollo defeated Vic Steamboat	Singles match
3	Killer Tim Brooks defeated Al Madril	Singles match
4	The Spoiler and Matt Borne defeated Ted Arcidi and Percy Pringle	Tug of war
5	Ted Arcidi (c) defeated Matt Borne	Singles match for the WCWA Texas Heavyweight Championship
6	Steve and Shaun Simpson defeated Eric Embry and Frankie Lancaster (c)	Tag team match for the WCWA World Tag Team Championship
7	Tony Atlas (c) defeated Brian Adias	Singles match for the WCWA Texas Brass Knuckles Championship
8	Al Perez (c) defeated Kevin Von Erich via countout.	Singles match for the WCWA World Heavyweight Championship
(c) / – the champion(s) heading into the match

== Thanksgiving Star Wars ==
Thanksgiving Star Wars (1987)
- Promotion: World Class Wrestling Association
- Date: November 26, 1987
- City: Dallas, Texas
- Venue: Reunion Arena
- Attendance: 7,000

Event chronology
← Previous; 4th Cotton Bowl Extravaganza	Next → Christmas Star Wars 1987

WCWA Star Wars chronology
← Previous; Labor Day	Next → Christmas

Thanksgiving Star Wars (1987) was a professional wrestling supercard show that was held on November 26, 1987. The show was produced and scripted by the Dallas, Texas-based World Class Wrestling Association (WCWA) professional wrestling promotion and held in their home area, Dallas, Texas. Several matches from the show were taped for WCWA's television shows and broadcast in the weeks following the show. The show was the 30th overall show in the "Wrestling Star Wars" event chronology. The show, held at the Reunion Arena, drew 7,000 spectators out of its approximately 21,000 seat capacity.

=== Results ===
No.	Results	Stipulations	Times
1	Killer Tim Brooks defeated Vic Steamboat	Singles match	—
2	Kerry Von Erich defeated The Thing	Singles match	00:57
3	Frankie Lancaster defeated Al Madril	Singles match	—
4	The Spoiler defeated Tony Falk	Singles match	—
5	Chris Adams and Matt Borne defeated The Iron Sheik and The Thing by disqualification	Tag team match	—
6	Shaun Simpson defeated Eric Embry (c)	Singles match for the WCWA World Light Heavyweight Championship	—
7	Kevin Von Erich defeated Al Perez	"Texas death" match	—
8	Kerry Von Erich defeated Brian Adias	Singles match	—
9	Kerry Von Erich defeated Al Perez	Singles match	—
(c) / – the champion(s) heading into the match

== Christmas Star Wars ==
Christmas Star Wars (1987)
- Promotion: World Class Wrestling Association
- Date: December 25, 1987
- City: Dallas, Texas
- Venue: Reunion Arena
- Attendance: 2,623

Event chronology
← Previous; Thanksgiving Star Wars	Next → 5th Von Erich Memorial Parade of Champions

WCWA Star Wars chronology
← Previous; Thanksgiving	Next → January 1989

Christmas Star Wars (1987) was a professional wrestling supercard show that was held on December 25, 1987. The show was produced and scripted by the Dallas, Texas-based World Class Wrestling Association (WCWA) professional wrestling promotion and held in their home area, Dallas, Texas. Several matches from the show were taped for WCWA's television shows and broadcast in the weeks following the show. The show was the 31st overall show in the "Wrestling Star Wars" event chronology. The show, at the Reunion Arena, drew 2,623 spectators out of its approximately 21,000 seat capacity.

=== Results ===
No.	Results	Stipulations
1	The Missing Link defeated Vince Apollo	Singles match
2	The Real Thing defeated Jason Sterling	Singles match
3	Brian Adias vs. Bill Irwin ended in a double count-out	Singles match
4	The Fantastics (Bobby Fulton and Tommy Rogers) defeated Jack Victory and John Tatum	Tag team match
5	Kerry Von Erich won the match	24-man pole battle royal
6	Matt Borne (c) defeated The Iron Sheik	Singles match for the WCWA Texas Heavyweight Championship
7	Jeff Raitz defeated Tony Falk	Singles match
8	Eric Embry defeated Shaun Simpson (c)	Steel Cage match for the WCWA World Light Heavyweight Championship
9	Kevin Von Erich, Chris Adams and Steve Simpson defeated the Fabulous Freebirds (Terry Gordy, Buddy Roberts and Iceman Parsons)	Steel Cage Match for the vacant WCWA World Six-Man Tag Team Championship
10	Al Perez (c) defeated Kerry Von Erich	Steel cage match for the WCWA World Heavyweight Championship
(c) / – the champion(s) heading into the match
