= Big Time Wrestling =

Big Time Wrestling (or NWA Big Time Wrestling) may refer to:

- 50th State Big Time Wrestling, sometimes NWA Hawaii, a defunct professional wrestling promotion headquartered in Honolulu, Hawaii, United States
- All Star Wrestling, an active professional wrestling promotion headquartered in Birkenhead, England which frequently trades under the alternative name Big Time Wrestling
- Big Time Wrestling (Boston), a defunct professional wrestling promotion headquartered in Boston, Massachusetts, United States
- Big Time Wrestling (Detroit), sometimes NWA Big Time Wrestling or NWA Detroit, a defunct professional wrestling promotion headquartered in Detroit, Michigan, United States
- Big Time Wrestling (San Francisco), sometimes NWA San Francisco, a defunct professional wrestling promotion headquartered in San Francisco, California, United States
- NWA All-Star Wrestling, a defunct professional wrestling promotion headquartered in Vancouver, British Columbia, Canada originally known as Big Time Wrestling
- Stampede Wrestling, a defunct professional wrestling promotion headquartered in Calgary, Alberta, Canada originally known as Big Time Wrestling
- World Class Championship Wrestling, a defunct professional wrestling promotion headquartered in Dallas, Texas, United States originally known as Big Time Wrestling (sometimes NWA Big Time Wrestling)
  - Big Time Wrestling Star Wars (1981), a supercard held by World Class Championship Wrestling in 1981
