= Big Time Wrestling Star Wars (1981) =

Professional wrestling show series

NWA Big Time Wrestling (BTW; Later known as World Class Championship Wrestling), based out of Dallas, Texas held their first major professional wrestling super shows under the name Wrestling Star Wars in 1981, an event series that would run until 1989, with at least three of these being held in 1981. Promoter Fritz Von Erich held two "Wrestling Star Wars" events, one in June and one in October as well as a special "Christmas Star Wars" on December 25 of that year.

== Wrestling Star Wars (June) ==
Big Time Wrestling Star Wars
- Promotion: NWA Big Time Wrestling
- Date: June 4, 1981
- City: Dallas, Texas
- Venue: Reunion Arena

Event chronology
← Previous; Big Time Wrestling Parade of Champions	Next → Wrestling Star Wars

Wrestling Star Wars chronology
← Previous; First	Next → October 1981

Wrestling Star Wars (June 1981) was a professional wrestling supercard show that was held on June 4, 1981. The show was produced and scripted by the Dallas, Texas based Big Time Wrestling (BTW) professional wrestling promotion and held in their home area, the Dallas, Texas. Several matches from the show were taped for BTW's television shows and broadcast in the weeks following the show. It is believed that the June 4, 1981 version of "Wrestling Star Wars" was the first overall show in the "Wrestling Star Wars" event chronology. The show was held at the Reunion Arena.

Due to sparse records from 1981 the full show has not been found documented, only three matches on the show have been verified. Kerry Von Erich defeated Ernie Ladd to win the NWA American Heavyweight Championship on the show, Bruiser Brody defeated The Great Kabuki in a Texas Death Steel Cage match and, as a result of the latter, Fritz Von Erich was able to face The Great Kabuki's manager, Gary Hart, for five minutes in the cage in an impromptu match. As of May 2019, all known matches are available as Hidden Gems on the WWE Network.

=== Results ===
No.	Results	Stipulations	Times
1	B. Brian Blair defeated Carlos Zapata	Singles match	—
2	Al Madril defeated Austin Idol	Singles match	—
3	Ten Gu defeated Jesse Barr & Ricky Romero	Handicap match	—
4	Fritz Von Erich and José Lothario defeated Tim Brooks and René Guajardo	Tag team	—
5	Chang Chung defeated The Spoiler	Singles match	—
6	Kerry Von Erich defeated Ernie Ladd (c)	Singles match for the NWA American Heavyweight Championship	—
7	Bruiser Brody defeated The Great Kabuki	"Texas Death" Steel cage match	9:58
8	Fritz Von Erich defeated Gary Hart	Steel cage match	5:00
(c) / – the champion(s) heading into the match

== Wrestling Star Wars (October) ==
Big Time Wrestling Star Wars
- Promotion: NWA Big Time Wrestling
- Date: October 25, 1981
- City: Dallas, Texas
- Venue: Reunion Arena

Wrestling Star Wars chronology
← Previous; June 1981	Next → Christmas

Wrestling Star Wars (October 1981) was a professional wrestling supercard show that was held on October 25, 1981. The show was produced and scripted by the Dallas, Texas based Big Time Wrestling (BTW) professional wrestling promotion and held in their home area, the Dallas, Texas. Several matches from the show were taped for BTW's television shows and broadcast in the weeks following the show. Records are not clear on if this show was the second or third overall show in the "Wrestling Star Wars" event chronology. The show was held at the Reunion Arena.

Big Time Wrestling promoter Fritz Von Erich's son Kevin Von Erich was supposed to team up with Kerry Von Erich on the show, but had to be replaced at the last moment by Terry Orndorff. Kerry Von Erich and Orndorff would go on to defeat the team of the Great Kabuki and Chan Chung to win the NWA American Tag Team Championship.

=== Results ===
No.	Results	Stipulations	Times
1	Frank Dusek defeated Jesse Leon	Singles match	04:47
2	Terry Orndorff defeated Richard Blood	Singles match	12:47
3	Chan Chung defeated Big Daddy Bundy by disqualification	Singles match	05:21
4	Junkyard Dog defeated Armand Hussein	Singles match	10:35
5	Ernie Ladd (c) defeated Jose Lothario	Singles match for the NWA Texas Brass Knuckles Championship	09:22
6	David Von Erich defeated Killer Tim Brooks	Bunkhouse match	04:10
7	Kerry Von Erich and Terry Orndorff defeated the Great Kabuki and Chan Chung (c)	Tag team match the NWA American Tag Team Championship	20:08
8	Al Madril (c) defeated Bill Irwin via DQ	Singles match for the NWA Texas Heavyweight Championship	15:42
(c) / – the champion(s) heading into the match

== Christmas Star Wars ==
Christmas Star Wars
- Promotion: NWA Big Time Wrestling
- Date: December 25, 1981
- City: Dallas, Texas
- Venue: Reunion Arena

Wrestling Star Wars chronology
← Previous; October 1981	Next → March 1982

Christmas Star Wars (1981) was a professional wrestling supercard show that was held on December 25, 1981 The show was produced and scripted by the Dallas, Texas based Big Time Wrestling (BTW) professional wrestling promotion and held in their home area, the Dallas, Texas. Several matches from the show were taped for BTW's television shows and broadcast in the weeks following the show. The show was the third or fourth overall show in the "Wrestling Star Wars" event chronology. The show was held at the Reunion Arena. The show was the first show to be billed as "Christmas Star Wars", starting an annual tradition that would last until 1987.

For the show promoter Fritz Von Erich had brought in El Solitario from the Universal Wrestling Association (UWA) in Mexico to defend the UWA World Junior Light Heavyweight Championship as part of the show. Fritz himself wrestled one of his last high-profile matches of his career as he took on and lost to the Great Kabuki in a "Texas death" match where there were no disqualifications. The main event was a 14-man battle royal featuring wrestlers that had already competed once that night.

=== Results ===
No.	Results	Stipulations	Times
1	El Negro Assassino vs. Richard Blood ended in a time-limit draw	Singles match	15:00
2	Tiny Tom defeated Little Tokyo	Singles match	09:56
3	Jose Lothario defeated Ernie Ladd (c)	Singles match for the NWA Texas Brass Knuckles Championship	06:33
4	Blue Demon and Al Madril defeated Arman Hussein and Carlos Zapata	Tag team match	13:52
5	El Solitario (c) defeated Killer Tim Brooks	Singles match for the UWA World Junior Light Heavyweight Championship	05:32
6	The Great Kabuki defeated Fritz Von Erich	"Texas death" match	14:32
7	Kerry, Kevin, and David Von Erich defeated Frank Dusek, Bill Irwin, and Ten Gu	Six-man tag team match	11:30
8	Big Daddy Bundy defeated Al Madril, Armand Hussein, Bill Irwin, Blue Demon, Carlos Zapata, David Von Erich, Frank Dusek, José Lothario, Kerry Von Erich, Killer Tim Brooks, El Negro Assassino, Richard Blood and Ten Gu	Two-ring battle royal	—
(c) / – the champion(s) heading into the match
