= WCWA Star Wars (1989) =

Professional wrestling show series

World Class Wrestling Association (WCWA), based out of Dallas, Texas held a number of major professional wrestling supercard shows under the name Wrestling Star Wars between 1981 and 1989, with two of these being held in 1989. WCWA held two "Wrestling Star Wars" events, one in January and one in March, the final "Wrestling Star Wars" shows of the series. On August 4, 1989, WCWA merged with Continental Wrestling Association (CWA) to become the United States Wrestling Alliance (USWA), which did not continue the Star Wars series.

== Wrestling Star Wars (January) ==
WCWA Wrestling Star Wars (January 1989)
- Promotion: World Class Wrestling Association
- Date: January 27, 1989
- City: Dallas, Texas
- Venue: Dallas Sportatorium
- Attendance: 3,300

Event chronology
← Previous; 5th Cotton Bowl Extravaganza	Next → Wrestling Star Wars

WCWA Star Wars chronology
← Previous; Christmas	Next → March 1989

WCWA Wrestling Star Wars (January 1989) was a professional wrestling supercard show that was held on January 27, 1989. The show was produced and scripted by the Dallas, Texas-based World Class Wrestling Association (WCWA) professional wrestling promotion and held in their home arena, the Dallas, Texas. Several matches from the show were taped for WCWA's television shows and broadcast in the weeks following the show. The show was the second to last Wrestling Star Wars show and the 31st overall show in the "Star Wars" event chronology. The January 1989 Star Wars was the only show in the series to be held in the Dallas Sportatorium, as they usually took place at the Reunion Arena in Dallas or the Fort Worth Convention Center in Ft. Worth, Texas. The show drew 3,300 spectators in the approximately 4,500-seat arena.

In the main event, WCWA main-stay Kerry Von Erich defeated Master of Pain in a singles match. The eight-match show also featured Eric Embry defeating long-time rival Gary Young and Iceman King Parsons defeating former tag team partner Brickhouse Brown. No championships were defended and only the third match, a First Blood match between Jimmy Jack Funk and Super Black Ninja had a special stipulation.

=== Results ===
No.	Results	Stipulations
1	Cactus Jack defeated Tony Falk	Singles match
2	Chris Adams defeated Killer Tim Brooks	Singles match
3	Jimmy Jack Funk defeated Super Black Ninja	First Blood match
4	Kevin Von Erich defeated Cactus Jack	Singles match
5	The Samoan Swat Team (Fatu and Samu) defeated Jeff Jarrett and Bill Irwin	Tag team match
6	Iceman Parsons defeated Brickhouse Brown	Singles match
7	Eric Embry defeated Gary Young	Singles match
8	Kerry Von Erich defeated Master of Pain	Singles match

== Wrestling Star Wars (March) ==
WCWA Wrestling Star Wars
- Promotion: World Class Wrestling Association
- Date: March 12, 1989
- City: Ft. Worth, Texas
- Venue: Will Rogers Coliseum
- Attendance: Unknown ($15,000 gate)

WCWA Star Wars chronology
← Previous; January 1989	Next → Last

WCWA Wrestling Star Wars (March 1989) was a professional wrestling supercard show that was held on March 12, 1989. The show was produced and scripted by the Dallas, Texas-based World Class Wrestling Association (WCWA) professional wrestling promotion and held in the Will Rogers Coliseum in Ft. Worth, Texas instead of the Reunion Arena where WCWA usually held their Star Wars shows in Ft. Worth. Several matches from the show were taped for WCWA's television shows and broadcast in the weeks following the show. The show was the 32nd and last Wrestling Star Wars show in the "Star Wars" event chronology.

Records only document two results from the show as they were later broadcast on television. The Star Wars shows generally consisted of eight or more matches, but records are unclear on the card for the last Star Wars. In the first of two documented matches Eric Embry defended the WCWA World Light Heavyweight Championship against the 300+ pound Botswana Beast in a match where the weight limit for the championship had been waived. Embry retained the championship. In the second confirmed match of the night Kerry Von Erich and Jeff Jarrett won the WCWA World Tag Team Championship from Robert Fuller and Jimmy Golden in what could have been the main event of the show.

== Results ==
No.	Results	Stipulations
1	Eric Embry (c) defeated The Botswana Beast	Singles match for the WCWA World Light Heavyweight Championship (Weight limit was waived for the match)
2	Kerry Von Erich and Jeff Jarrett defeated Robert Fuller and Jimmy Golden (c)	Tag team match for the WCWA World Tag Team Championship
(c) / – the champion(s) heading into the match
