= WCWA World Six-Man Tag Team Championship =

Professional wrestling trios tag team championship

WCWA World Tag Team Championship
- Championship belt

Details
- Promotion: World Class Championship Wrestling; World Class Wrestling Association
- Date established: December 25, 1982
- Date retired: 1988

Other names
- WCCW World Six-Man Tag Team Championship; NWA World Six-Man Tag Team Championship (Texas version)
Statistics
- First champions: The Fabulous Freebirds; Michael Hayes, Terry Gordy and Buddy Roberts
- Final champions: Michael Hayes, Kevin and Kerry Von Erich
- Most reigns: As team: The Fabulous Freebirds (Hayes, Gordy and Roberts) (5 times); Individual: Kevin Von Erich (11 reigns)
- Longest reign: Kevin, Mike and Lance Von Erich (282 days)
- Shortest reign: Fritz, Kevin and Mike Von Erich (1 hour)

The WCWA World Six-Man Tag Team Championship was a professional wrestling championship promoted by the Dallas–Fort Worth metroplex area-based World Class Wrestling Association (WCWA) from 1982 until 1988. The company was known as World Class Championship Wrestling (WCCW) in 1982 as they introduced the WCWA World Six-Man Tag Team Championship, on occasion billed as the NWA World Six-Man Tag Team Championship (Texas version). As it is a professional wrestling championship, it is won not by actual competition, but by a scripted ending to a match. (Note: Hornbaker (2016) p. 550: "Professional wrestling is a sport in which match finishes are predetermined. Thus, win–loss records are not indicative of a wrestler's genuine success based on their legitimate abilities – but on now much, or how little they were pushed by promoters")

The first champions were The Fabulous Freebirds (Michael Hayes, Terry Gordy and Buddy Roberts), who won the championship on December 25, 1982 as part of WCCW's annual Christmas Star Wars show. For storyline purposes David Von Erich actually substituted for Buddy Roberts in the match, citing "travel difficulties". After winning the match Von Erich gave the belt to Buddy Roberts, which was part of a building storyline feud between the Freebird and The Von Erichs. The Von Erich/Freebird storyline feud played a major part in the history of the championship as various combinations of Freebirds and Von Erichs were involved in 17 of the 19 reigns. Michael Hayes, Kevin Von Erich and Kerry Von Erich were the last team to hold the championship as it was abandoned in 1988.

The Freebird combination of Hayes, Roberts and Gordy held the championship a total of five times, the most of any trio. Kevin Von Erich held the championship 11 times with various partners including his father Fritz Von Erich, brothers Kerry, David and Mike Von Erich, as well as Michael Hayes, Brian Adias, Chris Adams, Steve Simpson and Lance Von Erich. The longest individual reign lasted 282 days as Kevin, Mike and Lance held the title from July 4, 1986 to April 12, 1987. The Freebirds' five reigns combined to at least 581 days, the longest combined of any team. Fritz, Kevin and Mike Von Erich held the championship for a matter of hours, as Fritz gave his third of the championship to Kerry Von Erich at the end of the show where they won it.

== Title history ==
Key
No.	Overall reign number
Reign	Reign number for the specific team—reign numbers for the individuals are in parentheses, if different
Days	Number of days held

No.	Champion	Championship change			Reign statistics		Notes	Ref.
No.	Champion	Date	Event	Location	Reign	Days	Notes	Ref.
WCCW World Six-Man Tag Team Championship
1	The Fabulous Freebirds (Michael Hayes, Terry Gordy and Buddy Roberts)	December 25, 1982	Christmas Star Wars	Dallas, Texas	1	191	Defeated Iron Mike Sharpe, Ben Sharpe, and Tom Steele. David Von Erich worked as a substitute for Buddy Roberts and immediately gave up his share of championship to Roberts	
2	The Von Erichs (Kevin, David and Kerry Von Erich)	July 4, 1983	Independence Day Star Wars	Ft. Worth, Texas	1	39		
3	The Fabulous Freebirds (Michael Hayes, Terry Gordy and Buddy Roberts)	August 12, 1983	WCCW Episode #86	Dallas, Texas	2	112	Aired on August 20, 1983.	
4	The Von Erichs (Kevin, David and Kerry Von Erich)	December 2, 1983	WCCW show	Dallas, Texas	2	(Note: The exact date on which the Von Erich lost the title is unknown, which means the title reign lasted between 30 and 60 days.)	Defeated Gordy, Roberts, and Ric Flair after Hayes loses to loser-leaves-town match to Kerry on November 24, 1983.	
5	The Fabulous Freebirds (Michael Hayes, Terry Gordy and Buddy Roberts)	January 10, 1984	N/A	Georgia	3	(Note: The exact date on which the Freebirds won the title is unknown, which means the title reign lasted between 96 and 126 days.)	Reportedly won the match and the championship by disqualification, no match actually took place.	
6	The Von Erichs (Fritz, Kevin (3) and Mike Von Erich)	May 6, 1984	Parade of Champions	Irving, Texas	1	0	This was a "Badstreet Rules Match" in which there were no rules. The illegal Von Erich made the pinfall.	
7	The Von Erichs (Kevin (4), Kerry (3) and Mike Von Erich (2))	May 6, 1984	N/A	Irving, Texas	1	48	Kerry replaced Fritz who had come out of retirement for one night only.	
—	Vacated	June 23, 1984	WCCW Episode #130	—	—	—	An NWA representative vacated the title due to the illegal Von Erich winning the match	
8	The Fabulous Freebirds (Michael Hayes, Terry Gordy and Buddy Roberts)	July 4, 1984	Independence Day Star Wars	Ft. Worth, Texas	4	61	Won the rematch between the Freebirds and the Von Erichs	
9	The Von Erichs (Kevin (5), Kerry (4) and Mike Von Erich (3))	September 3, 1984	Labor Day Star Wars	Ft. Worth, Texas	2	54	Mike Von Erich did not wrestle in the match due to an injury.	
10	Gino Hernandez, Chris Adams and Jake Roberts	October 27, 1984	Cotton Bowl Extravaganza	Dallas, Texas	1	65	Defeated Kerry, Mike Von Erich, and Bobby Fulton, substituting for Kevin Von Erich.	
11	The Von Erichs (Kevin (6), Kerry (5) and Mike Von Erich (4))	December 31, 1984	WCCW show	Ft. Worth, Texas	3	188		
12	Mark Lewin, Killer Tim Brooks and One Man Gang	July 7, 1985	WCCW show	Reno, Nevada	1	57	Defeated Kevin and Kerry Von Erich with Mike being unable to work the match.	
13	Brian Adias, Kevin (7) and Kerry Von Erich (6)	September 2, 1985	Labor Day Star Wars	Ft. Worth, Texas	1	123	Defeated Mark Lewin, One Man Gang, and Jack Victory.	
WCWA World Six-Man Tag Team Championship
14	The Fabulous Freebirds (Michael Hayes, Terry Gordy and Buddy Roberts)	January 3, 1986	WCCW show	Dallas, Texas	5	121		
15	The Von Erichs (Kevin (8), Kerry (7) and Lance Von Erich)	May 4, 1986	Parade of Champions	Irving, Texas	1	61	Steve Simpson substituted Kevin Von Erich in the championship match.	
16	The Von Erichs (Kevin (9), Mike (5) and Lance Von Erich (2))	July 4, 1986	WCWA show	N/A	1	282	Mike returned from illness and replaced Kerry, who was injured in a motorcycle accident	
—	Vacated	April 12, 1987	—	—	—	—	Vacated after Mike Von Erich committed suicide.	
17	Kevin Von Erich (10), Chris Adams (2) and Steve Simpson	December 25, 1987	Christmas Star Wars	Dallas, Texas	1	10	Defeated Terry Gordy, Buddy Roberts and Iceman Parsons for the vacant championship.	
18	The Fabulous Freebirds (Terry Gordy (6), Buddy Roberts (6) and Iceman Parsons)	January 4, 1988	WCWA show	Dallas, Texas	1	186	Defeated Steve Simpson, Chris Adams, and Matt Borne, substituting for Kevin Von Erich.	
19	Michael Hayes (6), Kevin (11) and Kerry Von Erich (8)	July 8, 1988	WCWA show	Dallas, Texas	1	(Note: The exact date on which the championship was abandoned is unknown, which means the title reign lasted between 1 day and 176 days.)	Defeated Roberts, Parsons, and Kimala, substituting Terry Gordy.	
—	Deactivated	July 22, 1988	—	—	—	—		

== Team reigns by combined length ==
Key

Symbol	Meaning
¤	The exact length of at least one title reign is uncertain, so the shortest possible length is used.

Rank	Team	# of reigns	Combined days
1	The Fabulous Freebirds (Michael Hayes, Terry Gordy and Buddy Roberts)	5	581¤
2	The Von Erichs (Kevin, Kerry and Mike Von Erich)	3	290
3	The Von Erichs (Kevin, Mike and Lance Von Erich)	1	282
4	The Fabulous Freebirds (Terry Gordy, Buddy Roberts and Iceman Parsons)	1	186
5	Brian Adias, Kevin Von Erich and Kerry Von Erich	1	123
6	The Von Erichs (Kevin, David and Kerry Von Erich)	2	69¤
7	Gino Hernandez, Chris Adams and Jake Roberts	1	65
8	The Von Erichs (Kevin, Kerry and Lance Von Erich)	1	61
9	Mark Lewin, Killer Tim Brooks and One Man Gang	1	57
10	Kevin Von Erich, Chris Adams and Steve Simpson	1	10
11	Michael Hayes, Kevin Von Erich and Kerry Von Erich	1	1¤
12	The Von Erichs (Fritz, Kevin and Mike Von Erich)	1	0

== Individual reigns by combined length ==
Key

Symbol	Meaning
¤	The exact length of at least one title reign is uncertain, so the shortest possible length is used.

Rank	Wrestler	# of reigns	Combined days
1	Kevin Von Erich	11	788¤
2	Terry Gordy	6	657¤
3	Michael Hayes	6	582¤
4	Buddy Roberts	5	581¤
5	Mike Von Erich	5	524
6	Kerry Von Erich	8	496¤
7	Lance Von Erich	2	343
8	Iceman Parsons	1	186
9	Brian Adias	1	123
10	Chris Adams	2	75
11	David Von Erich	2	69¤
12	Gino Hernandez	1	65
13	Jake Roberts	1	65
14	Killer Tim Brooks	1	57
15	Mark Lewin	1	57
16	One Man Gang	1	57
17	Steve Simpson	1	10
18	Fritz Von Erich	1	0
