= Gene Petit =

American professional wrestler (1949–2013)

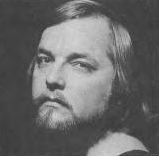
- Petit, c. 1981

Personal information
- Born: May 19 c. 1949 Humphreys County, Mississippi, U.S.
- Died: September 29, 2013 (aged approximately 65)

Professional wrestling career
- Ring name(s): Cousin Luke; The Mongol; Gene Lewis; Texas Red; Bloody Ox Brody; Kharma; Tom Steele
- Billed height: 6 ft 2 in (1.88 m)
- Billed weight: 301 lb (137 kg)
- Trained by: Dale Lewis
- Debut: 1973
- Retired: 2002

Gene Petit (c. May 19, 1949 – September 29, 2013) was an American professional wrestler best known for his portrayal of Cousin Luke in the World Wrestling Federation. He also competed under several other gimmicks and competed for several promotions in the United States as well as Australia, Japan, Nigeria and Puerto Rico.

== Career ==
=== Early career ===
Petit attended the University of Tampa, where he played for the football team. While there, he met former Olympic wrestler Dale Lewis. They became friends, and Lewis paid Petit to drive him to his bookings at professional wrestling events. Petit stated that he began wrestling after spending a couple of weeks practising in a gym.

At one of Lewis' events, the company did not have enough wrestlers and Petit was asked to fill in. He teamed with Lewis and Gypsy Joe Rosario in a six-man match. After his first match, in which he wrestled under his real name, he competed with the ring name Gene Lewis. He and Dale Lewis competed as kayfabe (storyline) brothers due to their similar appearance.

While wrestling in Florida in the 1980s, Petit joined a stable named the Army of Darkness. As a member of the group, which used a devil-worshipping gimmick, he used the ring name Kharma.

=== World Wrestling Federation ===
During a conversation with George Scott, a booker from the World Wrestling Federation, Petit received an unenthusiastic response to his query about joining the promotion. Petit then showed Scott a picture he had taken of himself as a joke, in which he wore "cutoff jeans, overalls, and a floppy hat". After seeing the picture, Scott offered Petit the role of Cousin Luke, a member of the Hillbilly Family led by Hillbilly Jim. As part of this gimmick, Petit was silent and expressionless and portrayed a rural Southerner who did not know how to wrestle.

He joined the other hillbillies in their feud with Roddy Piper, Bob Orton, Jr., and Jesse Ventura. Shortly after joining the company, Petit broke his ankle due to a problem with a defective wrestling ring. He was asked to compete at WrestleMania 2 against Adrian Adonis, the WWF's biggest show of the year, but had to decline due to the injury. Instead Uncle Elmer faced Adonis.

Petit explained the nature of his departure from the World Wrestling Federation in 1986 to SLAM! Wrestling: "Vince [McMahon] told me that they would keep me until the end of the year, leave me off for a few months, and then figure out another gimmick, because they were just going to keep Hillbilly. There was too much back and forth with Hillbilly and he got hurt; they brought Elmer in, and he got fired; Junior left; then I came in, and Hillbilly had a little disagreement with the office, so he took off for a few weeks. We had lost the steam that we had. I finished the year with them, and then started working the independents."

=== Later career ===
After leaving the WWF in 1987, Petit went to work for All Japan Pro Wrestling as Texas Red. For the rest of his career he worked in the independent circuit mainly in New Jersey and the New York City area under the name "Hillbilly Cousin Luke" to avoid confusion from Bushwhacker Luke whom his tag team partner Bushwhacker Butch referred to as "Cousin Luke." His last match was in 2002.

== Retirement and death ==
In 2000, Petit retired from wrestling due to back problems. Petit lived in Bernardsville, New Jersey and was a member of the board of directors for the Professional Wrestling Hall of Fame. He died on September 29, 2013, and was believed to be in his mid-60s.

He had had multiple sclerosis and diabetes in his later years and was residing in a long-term health facility when he died. His son wrestled on the Indy circuit for EPW, UWC and WCW as Big Kuntry aka Darrin Severs, and resides in New Jersey.

== Championships and accomplishments ==
- National Wrestling Alliance
  - NWA Central States Television Championship (2 times)
- World Class Championship Wrestling
  - WCCW Television Championship (1 time)
