= Dallas Sportatorium =

Former arena in Texas, United States

Sportatorium
- Dallas Sportatorium, The Million-Dollar Sportatorium, GlobalDome
- Interactive map of Sportatorium
- Location: 1000 S. Industrial Blvd (now Riverfront Boulevard) (intersection of Industrial Boulevard & Cadiz Street near the I-30/I-35E Interchange); Dallas, Texas 75207
- Coordinates: 32.766319°N 96.803073°W
- Operator: K. R. Adkisson Enterprises, Inc.
- Capacity: 4,500

Construction
- Built: 1935
- Opened: December 9, 1935
- Renovated: September 22, 1953
- Closed: 1998
- Demolished: February 2003
- General contractor: W.T. Cox
- Main contractor: Cox Fence Company

Tenants
- Burt Willoughby (1935–1940); Ed McLemore (1940–1966); Big D Jamboree (1948–1966); Southwest Sports, Inc. (1966–1969); Big Time Wrestling (1969–1981); World Class Championship Wrestling (1982–1989; 1990); United States Wrestling Association (1989–1990; 1991); Global Wrestling Federation (1991–1994); Southwest Airlines (1992); National Wrestling Alliance (1994–1995); Confederate/Continental Wrestling Alliance (1995–1997); World Class II: The Next Generation (1997); Arturo Agis (1998)

The Sportatorium was a barn-like arena in downtown Dallas, Texas, United States. With a seating capacity of approximately 4,500, it was used primarily for professional wrestling events. The building stood at 1000 S. Industrial Blvd, or the intersection of Industrial Boulevard and Cadiz Street, near the I-30/I-35E Interchange.

== Early history ==
Aerial view of original octagonal Sportatorium, 11 March 1949

Built in 1934 by the Cox Fence Company, the original Dallas Sportatorium was constructed in the shape of an octagon, and seated approximately 10,000. Its inaugural wrestling event, promoted by Burt Willoughby, took place on December 9, 1935. Willoughby promoted wrestling at the Sportatorium until 1940, when the company was bought out by its former concessions manager, Ed McLemore.

From 1948 until 1966, the Sportatorium was also the site of the Big D Jamboree, a weekly country music showcase similar in format to the Grand Ole Opry and Louisiana Hayride; portions of the Jamboree were broadcast nationally on the CBS Radio Network.

The Sportatorium was partially destroyed by fire on May 1, 1953, in what was rumored to be an act of arson by a rival wrestling promoter. It was quickly rebuilt at the same location as a rectangular venue (with a modified octagonal seating configuration similar to the original), and reopened on September 22 of that year, billed as "The Million-Dollar Sportatorium".

The arena also hosted boxing events and concerts featuring up-and-coming rock stars over the years, in a manner similar to the Grand Olympic Auditorium in Los Angeles during the same era.

In late 1966, promoter Ed McLemore formed a partnership with wrestler Jack Adkisson, better known as Fritz Von Erich, and acquired the Dallas/Fort Worth Wrestling Office, effectively breaking away from Paul Boesch and the Houston Wrestling Office. In January 1968, McLemore began suffering from a series of heart attacks and could no longer manage daily operations; he died on January 9, 1969, leaving Adkisson in control.

Under Adkisson’s leadership, the promotion—renamed World Class Championship Wrestling in the early 1980s—rose to fame, with his sons featured as the top stars. It became the most successful wrestling federation to regularly operate out of the Dallas Sportatorium.

WCCW ring announcer Gene Summers and referee David Manning at a live event in the Sportatorium, 1981.

The arena was configured with several ring aisles with the majority of the seats (mostly bleachers) set up on the east, south and west portions of the building. The north side of the building, best known as "Section D", was used mostly for a small stage and media area for cameras and reporters, but at least 10 rows of seats were also set up between the main stage/ring and the wall. A United States flag was displayed on the wall of section D for most of the arena's existence, and was changed once when the 48-star U.S. flag was replaced with a 50-star U.S. flag in 1960. The flag was moved to the section C area in 1987, then later above section I in the 1990s when the arena was refurbished for the Global Wrestling Federation.

During wrestling matches, the heel wrestlers came out of the northwest aisle, between sections B & C, while the babyfaces came out of the aisle on the southwest corner, or sections J & A. A broadcast studio was set up adjacent to the heel's locker room area; and an overhead section was later added for wrestling announcers to call the match.

On the Industrial Blvd side of the arena was the offices of Big Time Wrestling/World Class Championship Wrestling (WCCW). Jack Adkisson and his sons each shared office space in the arena. Others like David Manning, Gary Hart, Ken Mantell, Percy Pringle, Skandor Akbar and Chris Adams would also occupy the front offices of the arena.

Eric Embry, who was the Sportatorium's lead booker, lived inside the arena for a time in 1989.

== Decline ==
After WCCW folded in 1990 due to dwindling attendance, fundamental changes in the wrestling industry and tragedies involving a number of its top stars (including all but one of the Von Erichs, Gino Hernandez, and Bruiser Brody), the Sportatorium served as home base for the Global Wrestling Federation from 1991 to 1994 (billing itself for a time as the GlobalDome). Following the GWF's demise, a succession of smaller promotions (including the NWA between 1995 and 1996) attempted to hold shows in the building, each of them running out of money and closing their doors after only a short time.

However, it did gain one last bit of notoriety in March 1992 when Dallas-based Southwest Airlines held an arm-wrestling match between chairman Herb Kelleher and Kurt Herwald, chairman of Stevens Aviation, resulting from controversy over Southwest's use of the slogan "Just Plane Smart" (Stevens claimed that it infringed on its own "Plane Smart" slogan). The match was a publicity stunt designed to raise funds for charity.

The Sportatorium fell into disuse in the late 1990s when local independent wrestling promotions, by now drawing crowds only in the low hundreds, elected to run their shows in dance halls and other smaller venues instead. In addition, the aging arena was seriously dilapidated by this time, was out of compliance with local building codes, and was often used as a shelter by homeless people who entered the building illegally.

In late December 2001 a fire started inside the building. The flames quickly spread and caused major damage to the arena's upstairs offices. The fire proved to be the coup de grâce for the Sportatorium, its long-rumored demolition finally taking place in the spring of 2003. Before its implosion, Kevin Von Erich took off a bench-seat and a few items from the Sportatorium as souvenirs. Kevin took one final tour of the historic arena, which was featured in its famed DVD documentary Heroes of World Class, released in 2006. Exactly 10 years after the death of Kerry Von Erich, February 18, 2003, the "World Famous Sportatorium" Main Entrance sign was saved from demolition by wrestling announcer Doyle King, who retains possession of it to this day. It has been on display at several local wrestling reunions and some local Dallas Fort Worth wrestling events.

Although it had a reputation for being uncomfortable and unsanitary (having inadequate heating and cooling facilities, rodent infestation problems and apparently a large chamber or pit in the foundation), the Dallas Sportatorium is still considered one of pro wrestling's most legendary venues.

The land that had been occupied by the arena is slated to be a part of the new Trinity River Project, which has led to the renaming of Industrial Boulevard to Riverfront Boulevard.
