= José Lothario =

Mexican professional wrestler (1933–2018)

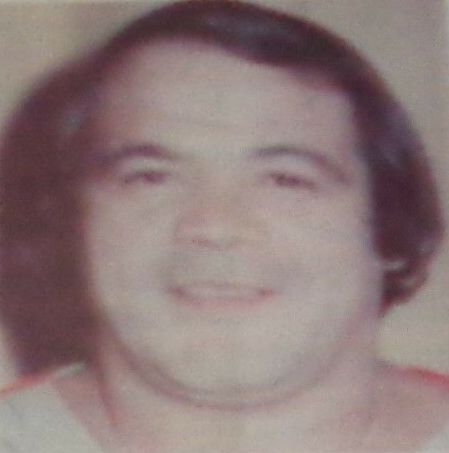
- Lothario in 1975

Personal information
- Born: Guadalupe Robledo; December 12, 1934 Monterrey, Mexico
- Died: November 6, 2018 (aged 83) San Antonio, Texas, U.S.
- Spouse: Jean Robledo(until 2002)
- Children: 3

Professional wrestling career
- Ring name(s): José Lothario; El Gran Lothario; Great Lothario; Supersock
- Billed height: 5 ft 10 in (178 cm)
- Billed weight: 227 lb (103 kg)
- Billed from: San Antonio, Texas
- Debut: 1956
- Retired: 1999

Guadalupe Robledo (December 12, 1934 – November 6, 2018) was a Mexican professional wrestler, best known by the ring name of José Lothario. He performed for such promotions as the National Wrestling Alliance (NWA) and the World Wrestling Federation (WWF, now WWE).

He was one of the first Mexicans to work for the WWF, where he trained Shawn Michaels.

== Professional wrestling career ==
Lothario started his career in the early ’50s in Mexico where he was an accomplished boxer and wrestler. Having already earned success there as a professional wrestler, Lothario was an established commodity when he moved to the US in 1957, working in the Carolinas under the name Joe Garcia. He later made his way into the Gulf Coast territory as "El Gran" Lothario, a nickname that stuck throughout his career. Playing off his strong background in boxing, Lothario would hold a number of brass knucks titles in various territories, with rugged taped fists bouts becoming one of his specialties. Dusty Rhodes, who began his career in Texas while Lothario was a headliner, called him the greatest Latin American wrestler and babyface in the world and one of his top five performers of all time.

Lothario competed in the National Wrestling Alliance for most of his career. He once had a winning streak of over 50 matches. On Christmas Day 1970, Lothario teamed up with Danny Miller to defeat The Infernos and win the NWA Florida Tag Team Championship. In storyline, the previous champions, Dusty Rhodes and Dick Murdoch, had been stripped of the title. Lothario's biggest feuds were with Gino Hernandez, whom he defeated in a hair match in November 1978, and El Gran Marcus. Teaming with the legendary Mil Mascaras, Lothario drew massive crowds in Houston and San Antonio against the heel duo of Black Gordman and Great Goliath. He was also a mainstay in Florida and Texas.

In Florida Lothario shared the Southern tag-team title with Don Curtis, Dory Funk Jr. and Joe Scarpa (aka Chief Jay Strongbow) on three occasions. He held the Florida tag-team belts with Argentina Apollo and Danny Miller. He held the Florida version of the NWA world tag-team title four times — twice with Wahoo McDaniel and once with Eddie Graham and Sam Steamboat. Lothario enjoyed greater success in Texas where he held several major tag titles. He shared the American tag-team belts on three occasions with El Halcon, and also had runs with Mil Mascaras, Tiger Conway Jr. and Ivan Putski. He held the Texas tag-team title six times, with Mil Mascaras, Rocky Johnson, Ivan Putski, Cien Caras and twice with Alberto Madril. Lothario also was a top singles performer in the Lone Star State, holding the Texas heavyweight crown on seven occasions, the Texas brass knucks crown five times, and the World Class Championship Wrestling TV title twice.

Lothario trained Shawn Michaels in the 1980s, with Lothario later becoming Michaels' manager in the WWF in 1996, managing Michaels to winning his first WWF World Heavyweight Championship at WrestleMania XII. At the In Your House 10: Mind Games pay per view in September 1996, Lothario squashed Jim Cornette. He continued to manage Michaels until Royal Rumble in January 1997. He briefly returned to WWF in January 1999 as part of a storyline involving Michaels. Lothario's son Pete was also a professional wrestler in the Texas area. His wife, Jean Lothario, also wrestled with Joe Blanchard's Southwest Wrestling Alliance.They have a daughter, Gina.

== Death ==
Lothario died on November 6, 2018, from natural causes at the age of 83.

== Championships and accomplishments ==
- Big Time Wrestling (San Francisco)
  - NWA World Tag Team Championship (San Francisco version) (1 time) – with Pepper Gomez
- Championship Wrestling from Florida
  - NWA Brass Knuckles Championship (Florida version) (3 times)
  - NWA Florida Tag Team Championship (2 times) – with Argentina Apollo (1) and Danny Miller (1)
  - NWA Southern Tag Team Championship (Florida version) (5 times) – with Don Curtis (1), Joe Scarpa (3) and Dory Funk (1)
  - NWA World Tag Team Championship (Florida version) (4 times) – with Wahoo McDaniel (2), Eddie Graham (1) and Sam Steamboat (1)
- Gulf Coast Championship Wrestling
  - NWA Gulf Coast Heavyweight Championship (1 time)
- L&G Promotions
  - L&G Caribbean Heavyweight Championship (3 times)
- National Wrestling Alliance
  - NWA Hall of Fame (2017)
- NWA Western States Sports
  - NWA World Tag Team Championship (Amarillo version) (1 time) – with Pepper Gomez
- NWA Big Time Wrestling
  - NWA American Tag Team Championship (6 times) – with Ivan Putski (1), Mil Máscaras (1), El Halcon (3) and Tiger Conway Jr. (1)
  - NWA Brass Knuckles Championship (Texas version) (5 times)
  - NWA Texas Heavyweight Championship (7 times)
  - NWA Texas Tag Team Championship (6 times) – with Mil Máscaras (1), Ivan Putski (1), Alberto Madril (2), Rocky Johnson (1) and Cien Caras (1)
  - WCCW Television Championship (2 times)
- NWA Tri-State
  - NWA Louisiana Heavyweight Championship (Tri-State version) (1 time)
- Professional Wrestling Hall of Fame and Museum
  - Class of 2021
