= Al Madril =

American professional wrestler

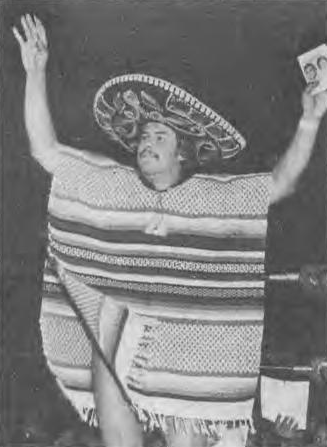

Personal information
- Born: Alberto Madril (Philip Victor Garcia); March 15, 1950 (age 76) San Bernardino, California, U.S.

Professional wrestling career
- Ring name(s): Al Madril; Leo Madril
- Billed height: 6 ft 1 in (1.85 m)
- Billed weight: 231 lb (105 kg)
- Debut: 1970
- Retired: 1993

Alberto Madril (born March 20, 1950) is an American retired professional wrestler.

== Professional wrestling career ==
Madril began his wrestling career in 1970. During the first half of the decade, he competed in Pacific Northwest Wrestling, the Portland, Oregon-based division of the National Wrestling Alliance (NWA). While there, he formed a tag team known as The Compadres with José González and won the NWA Pacific Northwest Tag Team Championship on July 2, 1973. Wrestling under the ring name Leo Madril, he also competed in the Vancouver, British Columbia-based NWA All-Star Wrestling. He held the Vancouver version of the NWA Canadian Tag Team Championship twice, teaming with Flash Gordon for the first win, and Dan Kroffat for the second.

Competing once again under his real name, Madril then moved to Texas to continue his career. In 1975, he won the NWA Texas Heavyweight Championship on three occasions, defeating El Gran Marcus for the first and John Tolos for the others. He also teamed with Jose Lothario that year to win the NWA Texas Tag Team Championship twice. He wrestled for the World Wrestling Federation in 1984.

Late in his career, Madril was a traveling partner of Shawn Michaels, who was trained by his former tag team partner Lothario. Michaels credits Madril with helping him develop an appreciation for the music of Elvis Presley. After adopting his "Heartbreak Kid" gimmick in the early 1990s, Michaels went on to host an interview segment in the World Wrestling Federation named the Heartbreak Hotel, after one of Presley's songs.

Madril was involved in a rather high-profile feud with the Von Erich family in late 1986 and much of 1987, when he formed a tag team sometimes referred to as the "Duo of Doom" with Brian Adias, who turned heel after accusing the Von Erichs of holding him back and preventing him from succeeding on his own merits. During one especially memorable incident, Kerry Von Erich, who was Brian's high school classmate in real life, confronted him regarding his actions. Still on crutches following his June 1986 motorcycle accident, Kerry was attacked by Madril, with Adias standing aside and allowing Madril to hit Kerry with one of the crutches several times before ring announcer Marc Lowrance finally managed to get Kerry out of the ring. Afterwards, Kevin Von Erich ran in and launched an attack on Madril. Adias and Madril would go on to win the World Class Tag Team Championship, while continuing to feud with the Von Erichs through the summer of 1987.

Madril competed until his retirement in 1993. He is currently working as a security guard for a hospital in Los Angeles.

== Championships and accomplishments ==
- Big Time Wrestling (San Francisco)
  - NWA World Tag Team Championship (San Francisco version) (1 time) - with Pepper Gomez
- NWA All-Star Wrestling
  - NWA Canadian Tag Team Championship (Vancouver version) (2 time) - with Flash Gordon (1) and Dan Kroffat (1)
- NWA Big Time Wrestling / World Class Wrestling Association
  - NWA American Tag Team Championship (2 times) - with Brian Blair (1) and Kerry Von Erich (1)
  - NWA Texas Heavyweight Championship (5 times)
  - NWA Texas Tag Team Championship (3 times) - with Jose Lothario
  - NWA World Junior Heavyweight Championship (1 time)
  - NWA World Tag Team Championship (2 times) - with Kerry Von Erich
  - WCCW Television Championship (1 time)
  - WCWA World Tag Team Championship (1 time) - with Brian Adias
- NWA Hollywood Wrestling
  - NWA Americas Heavyweight Championship (1 time)
  - NWA Americas Tag Team Championship (4 times) - with Chavo Guerrero Sr. (1), Mando Guerrero (1), and Tom Prichard (2)
  - NWA World Tag Team Championship (Los Angeles version) (1 time) - with Walter Johnson
- Pacific Northwest Wrestling
  - NWA Pacific Northwest Tag Team Championship (2 times) - with José González (1) and Ricky Santana (1)
  - NWA Pacific Northwest Television Championship (3 times)
- Southwest Championship Wrestling / Texas All-Star Wrestling
  - SCW Television Championship (1 time)
  - TASW Heavyweight Championship (2 times)
  - TASW Texas Tag Team Championship (3 times) - with Chavo Guerrero, Sr. (1), Magnificent Zulu (1), and Mike Golden (1)
