= WCWA World Heavyweight Championship =

Professional wrestling championship

- The WCWA World Heavyweight Championship belt used from 1986 to 1989

Details
- Promotion: World Class Wrestling Association
- Date established: June 6, 1966
- Date retired: 1990

Other names
- NWA United States Heavyweight Championship (Texas version); NWA American Heavyweight Championship; WCCW American Heavyweight Championship
Statistics
- First champion: Fritz Von Erich
- Final champion: Jerry Lawler
- Most reigns: Fritz Von Erich (20 reigns)
- Longest reign: Fritz Von Erich (738 days)
- Shortest reign: Fritz Von Erich (Less than 1 day - June 14, 1982)
- Oldest champion: Fritz Von Erich (52 years)
- Youngest champion: Mike Von Erich (20 years, 5 months, 2 days)
- Heaviest champion: King Kong Bundy 450 lb (200 kg)
- Lightest champion: Mike Von Erich 200 lb (91 kg)

The WCWA World Heavyweight Championship was a professional wrestling world heavyweight championship promoted by the Dallas–Fort Worth metroplex area–based World Class Wrestling Association (WCWA). The championship was originally created in June 1966 by WCWA's predecessor NWA Big Time Wrestling (BTW), billed as the local version of the NWA United States Heavyweight Championship before being renamed the NWA American Heavyweight Championship in May 1968. In 1982, Big Time Wrestling rebranded themselves as "World Class Championship Wrestling" (WCCW) and the championship was renamed the WCCW American Heavyweight Championship. In 1986 WCCW withdrew from the National Wrestling Alliance, creating the World Class Wrestling Association, replacing the WCCW American Heavyweight Championship with the WCWA World Heavyweight Championship, replacing the NWA World Heavyweight Championship as the top title recognized by the promotion. In 1989, the WCWA championship was unified with the AWA World Heavyweight Championship to become the USWA Unified World Heavyweight Championship as WCWA merged with the Continental Wrestling Association (CWA) to become the United States Wrestling Association. In 1990 WCWA split from the USWA, but the promotion folded without determining a WCWA World Heavyweight Champion. As it is a professional wrestling championship, the WCWA World Heavyweight Championship was not won by actual competition, but by a scripted ending to a match. (Note: Hornbaker (2016) p. 550: "Professional wrestling is a sport in which match finishes are predetermined. Thus, win–loss records are not indicative of a wrestler's genuine success based on their legitimate abilities – but on now much, or how little they were pushed by promoters")

The first recognized Texas-based NWA United States Champion was Fritz Von Erich, introducing the championship to his Southwest Sports promotion as the top championship in his territory. (Note: The NWA Worlds Heavyweight Championship was recognized by all NWA territories as the champion would travel the US to visit the promotions.) Fritz Von Erich would go on to win the championship a record setting 20 times. At the time it was not unusual for the promoter, if he was also an active wrestler, to hold the championship multiple times, being that he would always be available to work shows and face off against various "outsiders". Fritz' last reign was on June 4, 1982 – 16 years after his first title victory. Rick Rude was the last WCCW American Heavyweight Champion and announced as the first WCWA World Heavyweight Champion on February 21, 1986. Jerry Lawler was the final champion, winning it on April 14, 1989, followed by the announcement that the championship had been unified with the AWA World Heavyweight Champion in September 1990. The longest confirmed reign, Fritz Von Erich's fifth reign over all, lasted from March 27, 1967 to April 5, 1968 for a total of 375 days. Von Erich's final reign was also the shortest in history, as he vacated moments after winning it in the main event of the Fritz Von Erich Retirement Show. With his last title victory Fritz became the oldest champion, at 52 years of age. Fritz's second-youngest son, Mike Von Erich, was the youngest champion at just (20 years, 5 months, 2 days). At 200 lb (91 kg), Mike was the lightest champion, while King Kong Bundy, tipping the scale at 450 lb (200 kg) was the heaviest.

== Title history ==
Key
No.	Overall reign number
Reign	Reign number for the specific champion
Days	Number of days held

No.	Champion	Championship change			Reign statistics		Notes	Ref.
No.	Champion	Date	Event	Location	Reign	Days	Notes	Ref.
NWA United States Heavyweight Championship (Texas version)
1	Fritz Von Erich	June 6, 1966	House show	Texas	1	3	Defeated Brute Bernard to become the first champion	
	Johnny Valentine	June 9, 1966	House show	Texas	1	56		
3	Fritz Von Erich	August 4, 1966	House show	Texas	2	133		
Championship history is unrecorded from August 4, 1966 to December 15, 1966.
4	Fritz Von Erich	December 15, 1966	House show	Texas	3	90		
4	Brute Bernard	March 22, 1967	House show	Texas	1	5		
5	Fritz Von Erich	March 27, 1967	House show	Ft. Worth, Texas	4	375		
6	The Spoiler	April 5, 1968	House show	Houston, Texas	1	(Note: The length of the reign is uncertain)		
—	Vacated	April 1968	—	—	—	—	Title held up due to interference by manager Gary Hart	
NWA American Heavyweight Championship
7	Fritz Von Erich	June 3, 1968	House show	Ft. Worth, Texas	5		Von Erich won a rematch against The Spoiler	
8	Kenji Shibuya	July 19, 1968	House show	Texas	1	(Note: One of the dates for this championship is uncertain, which means that the reign lasted between 1 and 52 days.)		
9	Fritz Von Erich	July 26, 1968	House show	Houston, Texas	6	258		
10	Baron Von Raschke	April 10, 1969	House show	N/A	1	19		
11	Fritz Von Erich	April 29, 1969	House show	N/A	7	3		
12	Johnny Valentine	May 2, 1969	House show	Houston, Texas	2	(Note: One of the dates for this championship is uncertain, which means that the reign lasted between 30 and 37 days.)		
13	Fritz Von Erich	June 2, 1969	House show	N/A	8			
14	Johnny Valentine	June 9, 1969	House show	Ft. Worth, Texas	3	56		
15	Fritz Von Erich	August 4, 1969	House show	Ft. Worth, Texas	9	1		
—	Vacated	August 5, 1969	—	—	—	—	Title held up after match against Johnny Valentine in Dallas, TX due to interference by Wahoo McDaniel	
16	Fritz Von Erich	October 21, 1969	House show	Dallas, Texas	10	94	Von Erich won a rematch against Johnny Valentine	
17	Johnny Valentine	January 23, 1970	House show	Houston, Texas	4	21		
18	Fritz Von Erich	February 13, 1970	House show	Houston, Texas	11	94		
19	Boris Malenko	May 18, 1970	House show	Ft. Worth, Texas	1	15	Defeated Mil Máscaras in tournament final	
20	Fritz Von Erich	June 2, 1970	House show	Dallas, Texas	12			
21	Baron von Raschke	June 9, 1970	House show	Texas	2			
22	Fritz Von Erich	June 14, 1970	House show	Texas	13	187		
23	Toru Tanaka	December 18, 1970	House show	Houston, Texas	1	66		
24	Fritz Von Erich	February 22, 1971	House show	Ft. Worth, Texas	14	1		
25	Toru Tanaka	February 23, 1971	House show	Dallas, Texas	2	10		
26	Wahoo McDaniel	March 5, 1971	House show	Houston, Texas	1	281		
27	The Spoiler	December 11, 1971	House show	San Antonio, Texas	2	196		
28	Billy Red Lyons	June 24, 1972	Parade of Champions	Irving, Texas	1	14		
29	Johnny Valentine	July 8, 1972	House show	Corpus Christi, Texas	5	237		
30	The Missouri Mauler	March 2, 1973	House show	Chicago, Illinois	1	158	Awarded when Valentine goes to Japan	
31	Fritz Von Erich	August 7, 1973	House show	Dallas, Texas	15	231		
32	The Texan	March 26, 1974	House show	Dallas, Texas	1	21		
33	Fritz Von Erich	April 16, 1974	House show	Dallas, Texas	16	228		
34	Vacant	November 30, 1974	House show	Dallas, Texas		2	After a match against Blackjack Lanza	
35	Blackjack Lanza	December 2, 1974	House show	Texas	1	27		
36	Fritz Von Erich	December 29, 1974	House show	Dallas, Texas	17	736		
37	Bruiser Brody	January 3, 1977	House show	Atlanta, Georgia	1	99		
38	Fritz Von Erich	April 12, 1977	House show	Dallas, Texas	18	1		
39	Bruiser Brody	April 13, 1977	House show	Dallas, Texas	2	103		
40	Captain USA	July 25, 1977	House show	Fort Worth, Texas	1	67		
41	Ox Baker	September 30, 1977	House show	Houston, Texas	1	73		
42	Fritz Von Erich	December 12, 1977	House show	Fort Worth, Texas	19	273		
43	Bruiser Brody	September 11, 1978	House show	Ft. Worth, Texas	3	105		
44	Kevin Von Erich	December 25, 1978	House show	Ft. Worth, Texas	1	97		
45	The Spoiler	April 1, 1979	House show	Puerto Rico	3	42		
46	Wahoo McDaniel	May 13, 1979	House show	Houston, Texas	2	20		
47	The Spoiler	June 2, 1979	House show	Houston, Texas	4	64	Awarded due to injury to Wahoo McDaniel	
48	El Halcón	August 5, 1979	House show	Dallas, Texas	1	63		
49	The Spoiler	October 7, 1979	House show	Dallas, Texas	5	54		
50	Bruiser Brody	November 30, 1979	House show	Houston, Texas	4	33		
51	Ox Baker	January 2, 1980	House show	San Francisco, California	2	10		
52	Kevin Von Erich	January 12, 1980	House show	Dallas, Texas	2	99		
53	Toru Tanaka	April 20, 1980	House show	Dallas, Texas	3	8		
54	Kevin Von Erich	April 28, 1980	House show	Ft. Worth, Texas	3	21		
55	Gino Hernandez	May 19, 1980	House show	Ft. Worth, Texas	1	74		
56	El Halcón	August 1, 1980	House show	Houston, Texas	2	14		
57	Gino Hernandez	August 15, 1980	House show	Houston, Texas	2	127		
—	Vacated	December 20, 1980	—	—	—	—	Title held up after match against Kevin Von Erich	
58	Kerry Von Erich	December 28, 1980	House show	Dallas, Texas	1	(Note: One of the dates for this championship is uncertain, which means that the reign lasted between 4 and 131 days.)	Subbed for injured Kevin and won rematch against Hernandez	
59	Ken Patera	January 1981	House show	Texas	1			
60	The Masked Superstar	February 1981	House show	Texas	1			
61	Kerry Von Erich	March 1981	House show	Texas	2			
62	Ernie Ladd	May 11, 1981	House show	Ft. Worth, Texas	1	24		
63	Kerry Von Erich	June 4, 1981	House show	New Orleans, Louisiana	3	113		
64	The Great Kabuki	September 25, 1981	House show	Lawton, Oklahoma	1	92		
65	Bugsy McGraw	December 26, 1981	House show	Columbus, Ohio	1	72		
WCCW American Heavyweight Championship
66	Kerry Von Erich	March 8, 1982	House show	Ft. Worth, Texas	4	58		
67	King Kong Bundy	May 5, 1982	N/A	Lawton, Oklahoma	1	30		
68	Fritz Von Erich	June 4, 1982	Fritz Von Erich Retirement Show	Irving, Texas	20	0		
—	Vacated	June 4, 1982	—	—	—	—	Fritz won the title in his retirement match and vacated it immediately	
69	King Kong Bundy	June 15, 1982	House show	N/A	2	82	Awarded when Fritz retired	
70	Kevin Von Erich	September 5, 1982	House show	Ft. Worth, Texas	4	138		
71	Terry Gordy	January 21, 1983	House show	Dallas, Texas	1	42		
72	Kevin Von Erich	March 4, 1983	House show	Dallas, Texas	5	129		
—	Vacated	July 11, 1983	House show	—	—	—	Title held up after match against Jimmy Garvin	
73	Jimmy Garvin	July 25, 1983	House show	Ft. Worth, Texas	1	122	Won rematch against Kevin Von Erich	
74	Chris Adams	November 24, 1983	Thanksgiving Star Wars	Dallas, Texas	1	31		
75	Jimmy Garvin	December 25, 1983	Christmas Star Wars	Dallas, Texas	2	36		
76	Chris Adams	January 30, 1984	Wrestling Star Wars	Ft. Worth, Texas	2	63		
77	Jimmy Garvin	April 2, 1984	House show	Ft. Worth, Texas	3	2		
78	Chris Adams	April 4, 1984	House show	Texas	3			
79	Jimmy Garvin	April 1984	House show	Texas	4	18		
80	Gino Hernandez	May 18, 1984	House show	San Juan, Puerto Rico	3	77		
81	Mike Von Erich	August 3, 1984	House show	Dallas, Texas	1	31		
82	Gino Hernandez	September 3, 1984	Labor Day Star Wars	Ft. Worth, Texas	4	56		
83	Kerry Von Erich	October 29, 1984	House show	Ft. Worth, Texas	5	102		
84	Chris Adams	February 8, 1985	House show	Dallas, Texas	4	147	Aired February 16, 1985 on WCCW Episode #164	
85	Iceman King Parsons	July 5, 1985	House show	Dallas, Texas	1	122		
86	Rick Rude	November 4, 1985	House show	Ft. Worth, Texas	1	242	On the March 1, 1986 episode of WCCW (Episode #218), WCWA representative Ken Mantell declares Rude the WCWA World Champion.	
WCWA World Heavyweight Championship (February 21, 1986)
87	Chris Adams	July 4, 1986	Independence Day Star Wars	Dallas, Texas	5	77	Highlights aired on WCCW Episode #237	
88	Black Bart	September 19, 1986	House show	Dallas, Texas	1	23	After Adams leaves WCWA, Bart is awarded the title with kayfabe explanation that he "won the title out on the West Coast" (Los Angeles). Aired on WCCW Episode #248	
89	Kevin Von Erich	October 12, 1986	3rd Cotton Bowl Extravaganza	Dallas, Texas	6	313	Match aired on WCCW Episode #251	
90	Al Perez	August 21, 1987	House show	Dallas, Texas	1	198	Won by forfeit	
91	Kerry Von Erich	March 6, 1988	House show	Dallas, Texas	6	19		
92	Iceman King Parsons	March 25, 1988	House show	Dallas, Texas	2	44		
93	Kerry Von Erich	May 8, 1988	5th Von Erich Memorial Parade of Champions	Irving, Texas	7	168		
94	Jerry Lawler	October 23, 1988	House show	Memphis, Tennessee	1	12		
95	Kerry Von Erich	November 4, 1988	House show	Dallas, Texas	8	35		
96	Tatsumi Fujinami	December 9, 1988	House show	Tokyo, Japan	1	1	Won by TKO when Von Erich was bleeding too heavily to continue	
97	Kerry Von Erich	December 10, 1988	House show	N/A	9	3	Fujinami refuses the title and returned it to Von Erich	
98	Jerry Lawler	December 13, 1988	SuperClash III	Chicago, Illinois	2	113	Lawler, the reigning AWA Champion, defeated WCWA Champion Kerry Von Erich to unify the titles. In January 1989, Lawler was stripped of the AWA title but was continued to be recognized as USWA Unified World Heavyweight Champion by WCWA and CWA.	
—	Vacated	April 5, 1989	House show	—	—	—	WCWA declares the title vacant after a match against Kerry Von Erich.	
99	Jerry Lawler	April 14, 1989	House show	N/A	3	(Note: One of the dates for this championship is uncertain, which means that the reign lasted between 505 and 534 days.)	Lawler defeats Kerry Von Erich in rematch. On April 25, Lawler also regains the USWA title.	
—	Deactivated	September 1990	—	—	—	—	World Class Championship Wrestling ends business relationship with USWA and later closes down.	

== See also ==
- National Wrestling Alliance
- United States Wrestling Association
- World Class Championship Wrestling
