= Brian Adias =

American retired professional wrestler (born 1960)

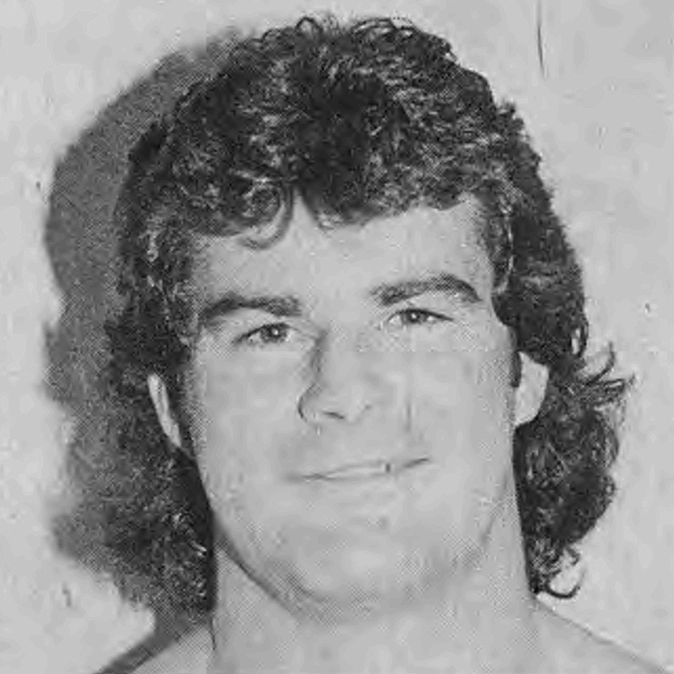

Personal information
- Born: Brian Gower; June 1, 1960 (age 66) Denton, Texas, United States

Professional wrestling career
- Ring name(s): Brian Adias; Brian Adidas; Brian Adidis
- Billed height: 6 ft 1 in (1.85 m)
- Billed weight: 238 lb (108 kg)
- Trained by: Fritz Von Erich
- Debut: 1979
- Retired: 2000

Brian Gower (born June 1, 1960) is an American retired professional wrestler, better known by his ring name, Brian Adias. He is best known for his appearances with World Class Championship Wrestling.

== Early life ==
Gower was a classmate of Kerry Von Erich in high school and a longtime friend of the Von Erich family. Gower was ranked 5th in the nation in High School in 1978 in the shot put and earned a 4-year scholarship to the University of Texas at Arlington where he won the Southland Conference Shot Put title 4 times in a row. Indoor and outdoor in 1981 and 1982. He graduated from U.T.A. in 1982 and began his wrestling career.

== Professional wrestling career ==
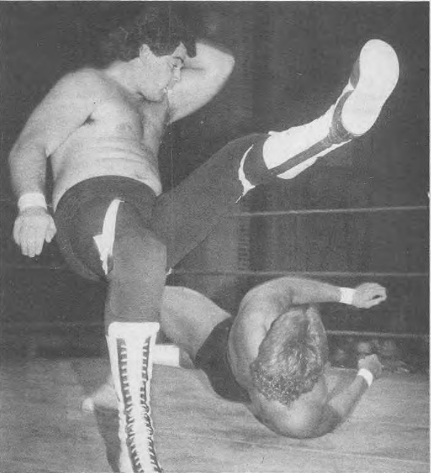
Adias attempts an elbow drop on Lance Von Erich, c. 1987

Gower was trained to wrestle by Texas-based Fritz Von Erich, debuting in 1979. Adias appeared, mistakenly billed as "Brian Adidis", at Starrcade 84 defeating Mister Ito. Fan magazines like Pro Wrestling Illustrated continued to list him in their regional rankings as Adidas for the next two years, but he was referred to as Adias in WCCW. Adias continued his alliance with the Von Erich family until the fall of 1986, when he turned heel against Mike Von Erich in a singles match which was Von Erich's first match back after a near-fatal bout with Toxic Shock Syndrome.

In an angle very similar to the one used with Chris Adams two years before, Adias declared that he wanted to succeed on his own merits, accused the Von Erichs of holding him back, and formed an alliance sometimes called the "Duo of Doom" with Al Madril. During the feud WCCW ran an angle where Kerry Von Erich, who was Brian's classmate in high school, confronted Adias regarding his actions. Still in crutches after his 1986 motorcycle accident, Kerry was attacked by Madril with Brian standing and allowing Madril to hit Kerry with the crutch several times before Marc Lowrance managed to get Kerry out of the ring. Afterwards, Kevin Von Erich came in and launched an attack on Madril. Madril and Adias would go on to win the World Class Tag Team Championship, while continuing to feud with the Von Erichs through the summer of 1987. In one incident, Kevin collapsed during an eight-man tag match involving Adias, which would set up an angle where he would develop his version of the Oriental Spike, a move made famous by Terry Gordy, calling it the "Oriental Tool".

Adias would continue his heel run into the Wild West Wrestling group but reverted to playing the babyface a few years later when the Global Wrestling Federation was launched in 1991. Adias later turned to sales work, only wrestling sporadically for the rest of the decade, before resurfacing for a while in the GWF during its run on ESPN in the early 1990s. Adias retired from wrestling completely in 2000 and is currently selling real estate and owns NTXHOMEZONE with his partner Chad Odom.

== Championships and accomplishments ==
- Continental Wrestling Alliance
  - CWA Tag Team Championship (1 time) - with Mike Blackheart
- Maple Leaf Wrestling
  - NWA Canadian Television Championship (1 time)
- Pacific Northwest Wrestling
  - NWA Pacific Northwest Tag Team Championship (1 time) - with Buddy Rose
- World Class Championship Wrestling / World Class Wrestling Association
  - NWA American Tag Team Championship (1 time)- with Iceman Parsons
  - NWA Texas Heavyweight Championship (2 times)
  - WCWA Texas Tag Team Championship (1 time)
  - WCWA World Six-Man Tag Team Championship (1 time) - with Kerry and Kevin Von Erich
  - WCWA World Tag Team Championship (1 time) - with Al Madril
