= Mike Von Erich =

American professional wrestler (1964–1987)

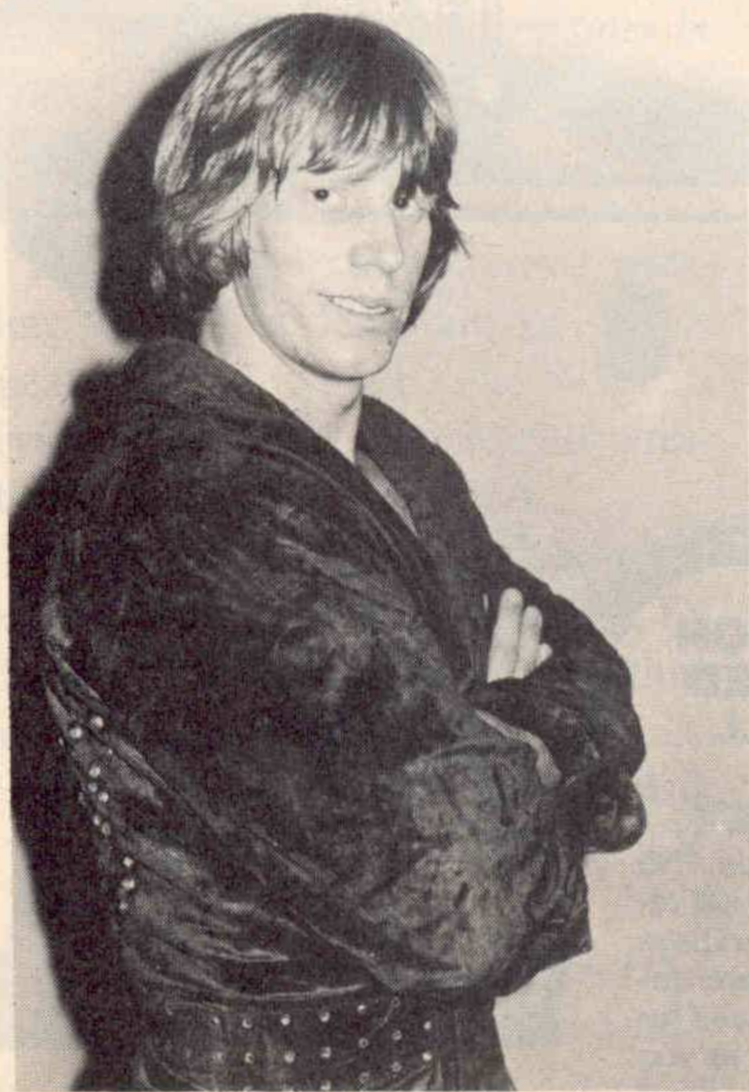
- Von Erich, c. 1985

Personal information
- Born: Michael Brett Adkisson; March 2, 1964 Dallas, Texas, U.S.
- Died: April 12, 1987 (aged 23) Lake Dallas, Texas, U.S.
- Cause of death: Suicide
- Spouse: Shani Garza (m. 1985; div. 1985)
- Family: Von Erich

Professional wrestling career
- Ring name: Mike Von Erich
- Billed height: 6 ft 1 in (185 cm)
- Billed weight: 200 lb (91 kg)
- Trained by: Fritz Von Erich
- Debut: 1983

Michael Brett Adkisson (March 2, 1964 – April 12, 1987) was an American professional wrestler under the ring name Mike Von Erich. His four brothers, David, Kerry, Kevin, and Chris, also wrestled. He was the son of longtime Texas wrestler and wrestling promoter Fritz Von Erich and a member of the Von Erich family.

== Early life ==
Mike had five brothers: David, Kerry, Kevin, Jack and Chris. His father, longtime Texas wrestler and wrestling promoter, Fritz Von Erich, trained all his sons in professional wrestling. Several wrestlers associated with Mike, such as his brother Kevin, King Kong Bundy, "Gentleman" Chris Adams, Gary Hart and Jake Roberts, have all stated that he never wanted to be a wrestler. Instead, he wanted to work for his father's company, World Class Championship Wrestling (WCCW), as a cameraman. He played the guitar and wanted to be a guitarist.

== Professional wrestling career ==
=== World Class Championship Wrestling (1983–1987) ===
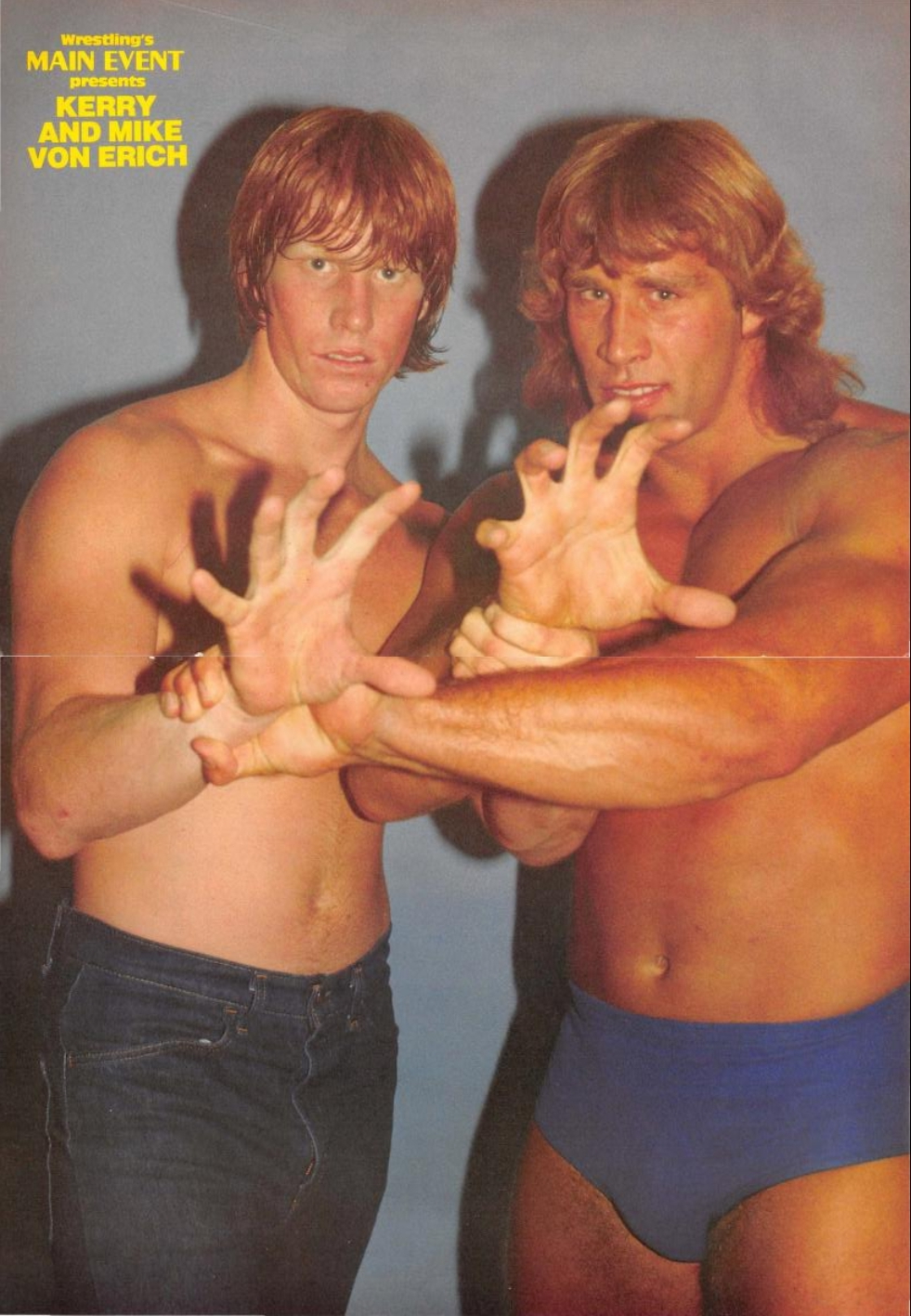
Mike (left) and his brother Kerry Von Erich, c. 1984

Mike made his debut on November 24, 1983, winning a match against Skandor Akbar during "WCCW Wrestling Star Wars" at the Reunion Arena. He was then involved in several encounters with The Freebirds. Von Erich and Michael Hayes brawled on October 17, 1983, in Ft. Worth, after Hayes ripped a jacket given to Mike by his brother Kerry. Mike teamed up with his brother Kevin against Terry Gordy and Buddy Roberts on December 25, 1983. The only time Mike ever teamed up with his brother David was in January 1984 when, along with Kerry, they battled the Freebirds. Mike took David's place teaming with Kerry after David's death in February 1984.

WCCW tried to give Mike a feud of his own against Brian Adias in October 1986, since Kerry was out of wrestling with an ankle injury. Mike and Adias were to battle in a match at Parade of Champions on May 3, 1987, but Mike died on April 12 of that year. His final match took place at the Sportatorium on April 3, 1987, against Mike Williams.

=== New Japan Pro-Wrestling (1987) ===
While wrestling for World Class, Mike ventured to Japan for the first and only time in his career, to wrestle for New Japan Pro-Wrestling in January 1987, during their New Year Dash series tour. Even though he didn't wrestle for very long on that tour, Mike had a strong encounter with then IWGP Junior Heavyweight Champion Shiro Koshinaka, facing him on January 3, in a losing effort. He also teamed with fellow foreigners such as Tony St. Clair, Black Bart, Konga The Barbarian and The Cuban Assassin against the likes of Antonio Inoki, Tatsumi Fujinami, Osamu Kido and Yoshiaki Fujiwara. However, he also enjoyed some success in it, scoring victories against veteran Kantaro Hoshino, young lion Shunji Kosugi and South Korean wrestler Kim Su Hong. After wrestling for 10 days in their tour, Mike returned home to America.

== Personal life ==
Mike was married on February 14, 1985, to Shani Danette Garza. Mike and Shani divorced later that same year. He was a born-again Christian.

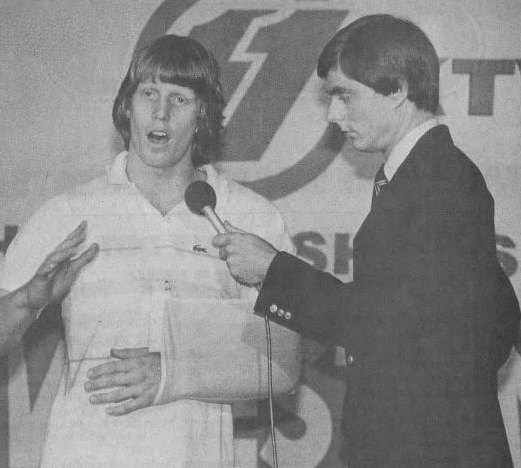
Mike (left) after his life-threatening shoulder injury, c. 1985

He underwent shoulder surgery on August 22, 1985, due to an injury suffered during a wrestling tour of Israel. He was released from the hospital but later he developed a fever of 107 °F (42 °C). He was later diagnosed with toxic shock syndrome. He suffered some brain damage as a result of his illness and lost a great deal of weight.

In 1986, he suffered head injuries from a car accident in which his vehicle overturned after he lost control. In addition, Kevin cited an incident in which Mike attacked a streetlight in frustration over his current condition. Kevin once said that Mike also suffered from the pressure of having to "be David" after his brother's death. Since the beginning of his career, Mike felt pressure to succeed on the same level as his brothers. Several people have said that Mike never wanted to be a wrestler. Instead he wanted to work behind the scenes.

== Death and legacy ==
On April 12, 1987, Mike left a suicide note for his family, then went to Lewisville Lake (originally known as Lake Dallas), where he drank alcohol and overdosed on the sleeping aid Placidyl. A few days before his death, Mike had been arrested for DUI and marijuana possession. His body was found four days later and buried at Grove Hill Memorial Park in Dallas.

Starting in 2001, Von Erich was part of the video game Legends of Wrestling series, first appearing in Legends of Wrestling as an unlockable character and in Legends of Wrestling II (2002).

In 2009, he was inducted into the WWE Hall of Fame along with his family. He was inducted by Freebird Michael Hayes. It was accepted by his surviving brother Kevin.

In 2019, Mike's story was covered as part of the Dark Side of the Ring episode on the Von Erichs.

The 2023 film The Iron Claw depicts the Von Erich family story, with Mike (whose story was fused with brother Chris's) being played by Stanley Simons.

== Championships and accomplishments ==
- Pro Wrestling Illustrated
  - PWI Most Inspirational Wrestler of the Year (1985)
  - PWI Rookie of the Year (1984)
  - PWI ranked him #288 of the top 500 singles wrestlers of the "PWI Years" in 2003
  - PWI ranked him #23 of the top 100 tag teams of the "PWI Years" with David, Kevin, and Kerry Von Erich in 2003
- World Class Championship Wrestling
  - NWA American Heavyweight Championship (1 time)
  - NWA World Six-Man Tag Team Championship (Texas version) (4 times) – with Kerry and Kevin Von Erich (3), Kevin and Lance Von Erich (1)
  - WCCW Middle Eastern Championship (1 time)
- World Wrestling Entertainment
  - WWE Hall of Fame (Class of 2009)
- Wrestling Observer Newsletter
  - Feud of the Year (1983, 1984) with Kerry and Kevin Von Erich vs. The Fabulous Freebirds
  - Match of the Year (1984) with Kerry Von Erich and Kevin Von Erich vs. The Fabulous Freebirds in an Anything Goes match on July 4
  - Worst Wrestler (1986)

== See also ==
- List of premature professional wrestling deaths
