= Have a Nice Day: A Tale of Blood and Sweatsocks =

1999 book by Mick Foley

Have a Nice Day!: A Tale of Blood and Sweatsocks
- First edition
- Author: Mick Foley
- Language: English
- Genre: Autobiography
- Publisher: ReganBooks; WWE Books
- Publication date: October 31, 1999
- Publication place: United States
- Pages: 544 pages
- ISBN: 978-0-06-039299-4
- OCLC: 42072177
- Dewey Decimal: 796.812/092 B 21
- LC Class: GV1196.F64 A3 1999
- Followed by: Foley is Good: And The Real World is Faker Than Wrestling

Have a Nice Day!: A Tale of Blood and Sweatsocks is an autobiography of former wrestler Mick Foley. It details his life all the way from his upbringing in New York to winning the WWF Championship from The Rock in December 1998. Foley had originally wanted the book to be called simply Blood and Sweatsocks, but this was eschewed in favor of his long-time catchphrase Have a Nice Day!, with the former being worked into the sub-title. The book was published on October 31, 1999 and debuted at #3 on the New York Times Best Seller list on November 7, 1999, and reached #1 on December 5.

The book is followed by three sequels. Foley is Good: And The Real World is Faker Than Wrestling released in 2001, wraps up the rest of his career and gives a behind-the-scenes look at the making of Have a Nice Day!. The second sequel and third volume to the Foley autobiography is called The Hardcore Diaries, examining Foley's various returns to WWE and giving an in-depth look at the build to a match at the 2006 ECW One Night Stand pay-per-view event, was released in March 2007; It was followed in 2010 by Countdown to Lockdown: A Hardcore Journal, about Foley's departure from WWE, and giving behind the scenes build to a match at the 2009 TNA Lockdown pay-per-view event.

== History ==
Foley did not make use of a ghost writer, writing the book himself while on the road. He wrote the entire book in longhand (over 760 pages; he claimed his typewriter broke). A ghostwriter, Lou Sahadi, was originally intended, but Foley was not satisfied with his work. The book, which was widely acclaimed following its publication, started a trend that saw several wrestlers including Edge (who also wrote his without the aid of a ghostwriter), Shawn Michaels, The Rock, Stone Cold Steve Austin, Hulk Hogan, Lita, Chyna, Dusty Rhodes, Ric Flair, and Chris Jericho writing their biographies.

In the book, Foley is critical of Ric Flair's booking abilities. In response, Flair wrote negative remarks about Foley in his own autobiography. The real life tension between the two was later translated into a worked feud. Foley stated later on that they became friends following a chance encounter on an airplane.

== Content ==
The book begins with a quick account of his WCW match with Big Van Vader on March 17, 1994, in which Foley's right ear was ripped off. It then goes back to 1983, when Foley was eighteen. From there it details his early life in college and the filming of his notorious short film "The Loved One", as well as a piece called "The Legend of Frank Foley" (Frank because a beautiful girl he had gotten a date with could not remember his real name) in which for the first time he introduced a character called "Dude Love". According to Foley, at the time the Dude was his vision of what he thought a man should be. "The Loved One" was enough to impress wrestler Dominic DeNucci, who would then train Foley to wrestle.

From there, the book goes on to chronologically detail Foley's escapades as "Cactus Jack" on the independent wrestling circuit, as well as his very first match in what was then called the World Wrestling Federation. It then continues to recount his years in World Championship Wrestling, as well as those that he spent in both Japan and Extreme Championship Wrestling. It then goes on to describe his re-entry into the WWF, the creation of his new persona "Mankind", and the reappearance of Dude Love in the WWF. The book details his experience in the "Hell in a Cell" match with The Undertaker that he had at King of the Ring 1998 which truly made him famous as Mankind. Due to the concussion he sustained during the match, he had to watch video clips of it to recall the details and write about it.

Finally, from there, it tells the story of the introduction of his stinky sock puppet, "Mr. Socko", and ends with his eventual WWF Championship win over The Rock.

Foley also breaks chronological history at a point during the book, writing about Owen Hart's death on the night it happened, rather than editing the news into a later chapter to fit in with chronology.

== Sources ==
- Mick Foley (2000). Have A Nice Day: A Tale of Blood and Sweatsocks. HarperCollins. p. 511. ISBN 0-06-103101-1.
- Mick Foley (2001). Foley is Good: And The Real World is Faker Than Wrestling. HarperCollins. p. 481. ISBN 0-06-039300-9.
