= WWE Books =

Subsidiary of WWE which publishes autobiographies/fiction based on WWE personalities

- Company type: Subsidiary
- Industry: Publishing
- Founded: 2002; 23 years ago in Stamford, Connecticut, United States
- Headquarters: Stamford, Connecticut, United States
- Key people: Executive vice president and publisher Louise Burke; Vice president and associate publisher Scott Shannon
- Products: Books
- Owner: TKO Group Holdings
- Parent: WWE

WWE Books is a subsidiary of World Wrestling Entertainment, a division of TKO Group Holdings, a majority-owned subsidiary of Endeavor Group Holdings, created in 2002 to publish autobiographies of and fiction based on WWE personalities, behind-the-scenes guides to WWE, illustrated books, calendars, young adult books, and other general nonfiction books. The majority of WWE Books are published by Pocket Books, part of the Simon & Schuster Adult Publishing Group. Simon & Schuster UK and Simon & Schuster Australia are the publishers of WWE books in the United Kingdom and Australia. Simon & Schuster publish multiple titles yearly, based on the personalities, programming, storylines, and other topics of interest to WWE and its fans.

In 2014, WWE Books and DK Publishing entered a multi-year publishing partnership to distribute and market WWE book releases on a global scale. The agreement also included digital and various subsidiary rights. DK has published a variety of titles including commemorative books, sticker books, historical guides, autobiographies and encyclopedias.

WWE Books are published in hardcover and large print editions, trade and mass market paperback, in audio on cassette and compact disc, and in eBook editions.

== Books published ==
=== Fiction ===
- Journey into Darkness: An Unauthorized History of Kane
- Big Apple Take Down

==== Novelizations ====
- See No Evil
- The Marine
- The Condemned
- 12 Rounds
- The Marine 2

==== Children's books ====
- Mick Foley's Christmas Chaos
- Mick Foley's Halloween Hijinx
- Tales From Wrescal Lane
- A Most Mizerable Christmas

=== Encyclopedias ===
- WWE Encyclopedia: The definitive guide to World Wrestling Entertainment (released 2009)
- WWE Encyclopedia Updated & Expanded: The definitive guide to WWE (released 2013)
- WWE Encyclopedia Of Sports Entertainment (released 2016)
- WWE Encyclopedia of Sports Entertainment New Edition (released 2020)

=== Autobiographies ===
Title	Author
Adam Copeland on Edge	Edge
Batista Unleashed	Batista
Cheating Death, Stealing Life: The Eddie Guerrero Story	Eddie Guerrero
It's True! It's True!	Kurt Angle
The Rock Says	The Rock
If They Only Knew	Chyna
"Classy" Freddie Blassie: Listen, You Pencil Neck Geeks	Freddie Blassie
Controversy Creates Ca$h	Eric Bischoff
Have a Nice Day: A Tale of Blood and Sweatsocks	Mick Foley
Foley Is Good: And the Real World Is Faker Than Wrestling	Mick Foley
The Hardcore Diaries	Mick Foley
Cross Rhodes	Goldust
The Hardy Boyz: Exist 2 Inspire	Matt & Jeff Hardy
Heartbreak & Triumph: The Shawn Michaels Story	Shawn Michaels
Hollywood Hulk Hogan	Hulk Hogan
It's Good to Be the King...Sometimes	Jerry Lawler
Lita: A Less Traveled R.O.A.D.--The Reality of Amy Dumas	Lita
The Stone Cold Truth	Stone Cold Steve Austin
Superstar Billy Graham: Tangled Ropes	Superstar Billy Graham
Tajiri: The Japanese Buzzsaw (Japan release only)	Yoshihiro Tajiri
Ted DiBiase: The Million Dollar Man	Ted DiBiase
To Be the Man	Ric Flair
Walking a Golden Mile	William Regal
The Unauthorized History of DX	Triple H & Shawn Michaels
Rey Mysterio: Behind the Mask	Rey Mysterio
YES!: My Improbable Journey to the Main Event of WrestleMania	Daniel Bryan
Accepted: How the First Gay Superstar Changed WWE	Pat Patterson
Second Nature: The Legacy of Ric Flair and the Rise of Charlotte	Charlotte Flair and Ric Flair
There's No Such Thing as a Bad Kid: How I went from Stereotype to Prototype	Titus O'Neil
Mayor Kane: My Life in Wrestling and Politics	Kane
A Chosen Destiny	Drew McIntyre

=== Miscellaneous ===
- Are We There Yet?: Tales from the Never-Ending Travels of WWE Superstars
- Divas Uncovered
- Making the Game: Triple H's Approach to a Better Body
- JR's Cookbook
- Main Event: WWE in the Raging 80s
- WWE Unscripted
- The Rise & Fall of ECW: Extreme Championship Wrestling
- Signature Moves
- The Ultimate World Wrestling Entertainment Trivia Book
- WWE Legends
- Have More Money Now by John "Bradshaw" Layfield
- Can You Take The Heat? (Cookbook)
- WWE Presents Comic Series
- My Favorite Match: WWE Superstars Tell the Stories of Their Most Memorable Matches
- The WWE Championship: A Look Back at the Rich History of the WWE Championship
- WWE 50
- 30 Years of WrestleMania
- Ultimate Warrior: A Life Lived Forever – The Legend of a WWE Hero
- WWE Ultimate Superstar Guide
- WWE: 100 Greatest Matches
- The WWE Book of Top 10s
- Undertaker: 25 Years of Destruction
- WWE: The Attitude Era
- Hustle, Loyalty & Respect: The World of John Cena
- WWE Book of Rules: And How to Break Them
- NXT: The Future Is Now
- WWE Absolutely Everything You Need to Know
- The Book of Booty: Shake It. Love It. Never Be It.
- WWE RAW: The First 25 Years
- Creating the Mania: An Inside Look at How WrestleMania Comes to Life
- WWE Ultimate Superstar Guide, 2nd Edition
- The World of The Rock
- WWE: The Official Cookbook
- WWE SmackDown 20 Years and Counting
- WWE Greatest Rivalries
- WWE 35 Years of Wrestlemania
- WWE Kicking Down Doors: Female Superstars Are Ruling the Ring and Changing the Game!
- WWE Beyond Extreme

== See also ==
- WWE Heroes
- WWE Magazine
