= Controversy Creates Cash =

2006 book by Eric Bischoff

- Author: Eric Bischoff; Jeremy Roberts
- Language: English
- Genre: Autobiography
- Publisher: WWE Books; Pocket Books
- Publication date: October 17, 2006
- Publication place: United States
- Media type: Hardcover and paperback
- Pages: 400
- ISBN: 1-4165-2729-X
- OCLC: 70708122
- Dewey Decimal: 796.81209 22
- LC Class: GV1195 .B52 2006

Controversy Creates Cash (stylized as Controversy Creates Ca$h) is the autobiography of professional wrestling promoter and personality Eric Bischoff, written with Jeremy Roberts and published by WWE Books. It was released on October 17, 2006, and debuted at #16 on the New York Times Best Seller list, making it the highest-ranked WWE book since Ric Flair's To Be the Man in 2004. It was also #83 on USA Today's best-selling books for the week of its release.

== Promotion ==
On the September 25, 2006, edition of Raw, Bischoff delivered a worked shoot, claiming that before being unceremoniously and unjustly fired, he signed a book deal with World Wrestling Entertainment (WWE) and that his book was finished. Reflecting on the Monday Night War, he stated, "I tell the truth about a lot of things, most of which will piss off Vincent Kennedy McMahon." He then claimed that Raw in its then-current form would not be possible without him and that D-Generation X would not exist without the New World Order. Jonathan Coachman (in kayfabe) then cut off Bischoff and had him escorted out as Bischoff hinted at "the truth about Vince McMahon".

== Content ==
The book's prologue details Bischoff's July 15, 2002, debut on Raw as its new general manager, and it offers some background on how Raw came to be influenced by his work on WCW Monday Nitro. Topics covered in the book include Bischoff's childhood, his involvement in the American Wrestling Association, his work as vice president and president of WCW, and his take on the Monday Night War and working for WWE. The book focuses more on the business side of WCW as opposed to details regarding the on-camera action. Bischoff also addresses the problems and politics within WCW, and how he believes that "dirtsheets" have blown them out of proportion and misguided some readers.
