= Foley Is Good =

2001 autobiography by Mick Foley

Foley Is Good: And the Real World Is Faker Than Wrestling
- First edition
- Author: Mick Foley
- Language: English
- Genre: Autobiography
- Publisher: ReganBooks; WWE Books
- Publication date: May 8, 2001
- Publication place: United States
- Pages: 481 pages
- ISBN: 0-06-039300-9
- OCLC: 46472055
- Dewey Decimal: 796.8/12/092 B 21
- LC Class: GV1196.F64 A32 2001
- Preceded by: Have a Nice Day: A Tale of Blood and Sweatsocks
- Followed by: The Hardcore Diaries

Foley Is Good: And the Real World Is Faker Than Wrestling is the second autobiography (2001) of wrestler Mick Foley, then retired from active wrestling in WWE. It details his career from January 1999 until his retirement in April 2000 at WrestleMania 2000. The book was released on May 8, 2001.

== History ==
As in his first book, Foley wrote this one without the aid of a ghostwriter.

== Plot ==
The book covers the last years of Mick Foley's in-ring wrestling career up until the birth of his second son, Michael Francis Foley, Jr., which he mentions in the book's epilogue. It has a more celebratory tone than his first book, as he is writing about the time of his career where he has already achieved success. The book alternated between in-ring wrestling activities and Foley's life away from the ring. In the book, he also describes his obsessions, such as theme parks and Christmas.

He also writes about his experience writing his first book without the aid of a ghostwriter. He defends himself against being misquoted by news program 20/20, and explains the events surrounding his "I Quit" match with The Rock at the Royal Rumble in January 1999, which can also be seen in the documentary Beyond the Mat.

The book also heavily defends the World Wrestling Federation against accusations of being violent. Foley made an effort to pointedly refute claims made by detractors, citing statistical data and other evidence he compiled himself. He criticizes the actions of the Parents Television Council. Foley's extensive research project on the Parents Television Council's controversial views on the WWE at that time immediately follows the end of the book as an epilogue of sorts.

== Promotion ==
To promote the book, Foley appeared on The Howard Stern Show and did a ten-city book signing tour.

After three press runs, the book had approximately 230,000 copies in print. In May 2001, the book was the number one nonfiction book on The New York Times bestseller list.

== Sources ==
- Mick Foley (2001). Foley is Good. ReganBooks. p. 481. ISBN 0-06-039300-9.
