= The Hardcore Diaries =

2007 autobiography by Mick Foley

- First edition
- Author: Mick Foley
- Language: English
- Genre: Autobiography
- Publisher: Pocket Books; WWE Books
- Publication date: March 6, 2007
- Publication place: United States
- Pages: 371 pages
- ISBN: 1-4165-3157-2
- OCLC: 85481357
- Dewey Decimal: 796.812 22
- LC Class: GV1196.F64 A33 2007
- Preceded by: Foley Is Good: And the Real World Is Faker than Wrestling
- Followed by: Countdown to Lockdown: A Hardcore Journal

The Hardcore Diaries is the third autobiography of New York Times best-selling author and former WWE wrestler Mick Foley. The book was published on March 6, 2007.

== History ==
Foley's original idea for the book was a more behind the scenes look into Vince McMahon and the lead-up to WrestleMania. Foley, however, thought it would be difficult to write about the event without actually having a match in it, so he opted to write a journal-entry based book instead.

== Content ==
The book is the third installment of Mick Foley's autobiographical series and begins where the first two books – Have a Nice Day: A Tale of Blood and Sweatsocks and Foley Is Good: And the Real World Is Faker than Wrestling – leave off. Unlike his other two books, The Hardcore Diaries is set up in a journal or diary-type format. He focuses mainly on his involvement with WWE in 2006, including his match at One Night Stand with Edge against Terry Funk and Tommy Dreamer. It also includes the creative process surrounding the match.

Some of the topics Foley also talks about are his trips with WWE to Iraq and Afghanistan and his work with the Christian Children's Fund, as well as talking about his sons Mickey and Hughie who were born since Foley finished writing Foley Is Good in 2001 and 2003. He also mentions considering joining Total Nonstop Action Wrestling at the behest of his friend Scott Levy in 2005. He also does not shy away from criticizing WWE management.

== Reception ==
The book debuted in the number seven spot on the New York Times' bestseller list in the nonfiction category.

The book had mostly positive reviews. Ryan Nation of SLAM! Wrestling stated, "Overall, the book accomplishes what wrestling is supposed to do, which is to tell a story good enough that leaves fans satisfied yet wanting more." Steve Hughes, however, graded the book a C+ and stated, "Like a real diary, Foley goes from one thought to another. However, some of his thoughts aren't worth the proverbial penny, let alone 2,400 of them."
