= Tietam Brown =

- First edition (US)
- Author: Mick Foley
- Language: English
- Genre: Novel
- Publisher: Alfred A. Knopf (US); Jonathan Cape (UK)
- Publication date: 2003
- Publication place: United States
- Media type: Print Hardback and Paperback)
- Pages: 243 pp (paperback edition)
- ISBN: 0-09-945028-3 (paperback edition)

Tietam Brown is a novel written by American professional wrestler Mick Foley. This was Foley's first novel, published in 2003.

== Plot introduction ==
The book is about a period of time in the life of Antietam (Andy) Brown V and his father Antietam (Tietam) Brown IV (the names span across five generations, being taken from the Battle of Antietam). After 16 years of being tossed from foster home to foster home, and spending time in Juvenile Detention for killing a teenager who tried to rape him, his father then shows up to take him home.

Andy was molested by his foster father, who was also a member of the KKK, and physically abused by his father. He puts up with cruel treatment from adults and older students at school. Every now and then in his life he cracks, and in a rage causes terrible harm to his tormentors. He draws strength from the love he gets from Terri, a beautiful girl in his grade at school.

== Film adaptation ==
On WWE.com, the author Mick Foley wrote in his blog Foley is Blog that Paul Haggis, the director of the Oscar-winning movie Crash, was interested in making Tietam Brown into a feature film.
