= Mick Foley =

American professional wrestler and author (born 1965)

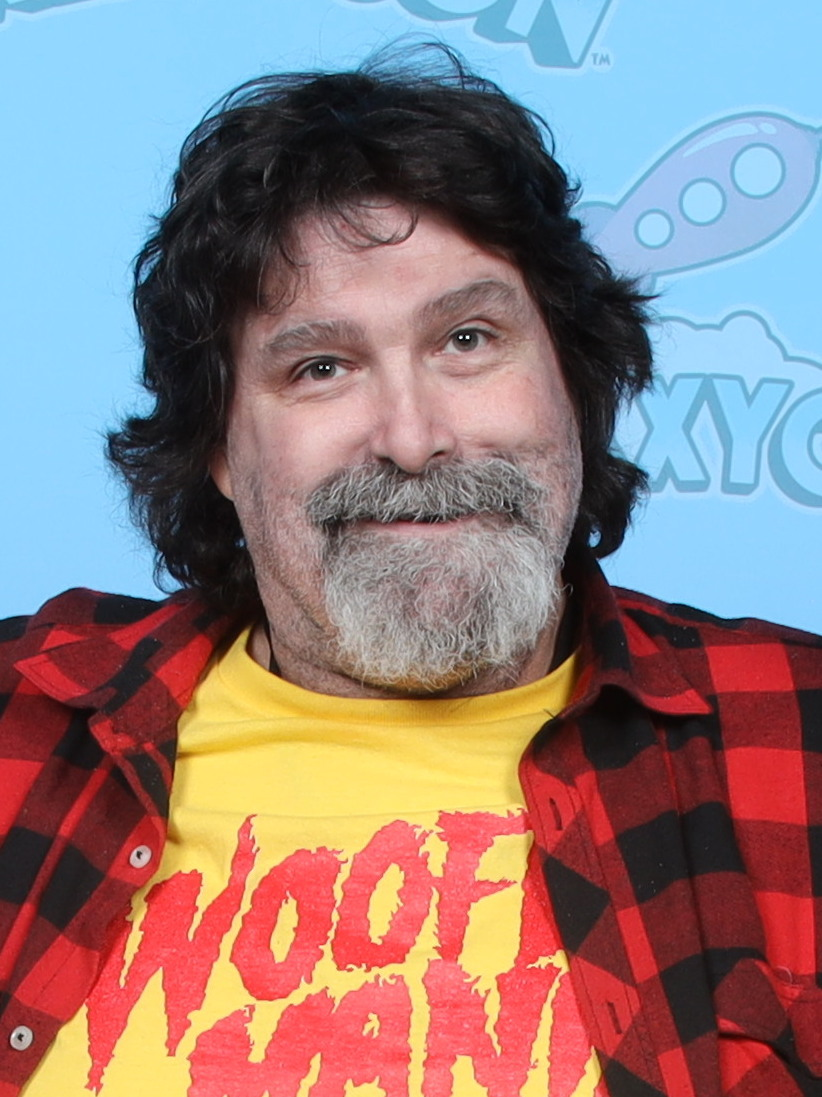
- Foley in 2024
- Born: Michael Francis Foley; June 7, 1965 (age 61); Bloomington, Indiana, U.S.
- Education: State University of New York at Cortland
- Occupations: Professional wrestler; author; actor; color commentator
- Years active: 1985–2012 (wrestler); 1999–present (author, actor)
- Spouse: Colette Christie (m. 1992)
- Children: 4
- Professional wrestling career
- Ring names: Cactus Jack; Cactus Jack Foley; Cactus Jack Manson; Dude Love; Jack Foley; Mankind; Mick Foley; Nick Foley; Zodiac #2
- Billed height: 6 ft 2 in (188 cm)
- Billed weight: 287 lb (130 kg)
- Billed from: Bloomington, Indiana (as Jack Foley); "The boiler room" (as Mankind); Long Island, New York (as Mick Foley); Truth or Consequences, New Mexico (as Cactus Jack / Dude Love)
- Trained by: Dominic DeNucci
- Debut: June 23, 1986
- Retired: January 29, 2012
- Website: realmickfoley.com

Michael Francis Foley (born June 7, 1965) is an American comedian, author, and retired professional wrestler. He is signed to All Elite Wrestling (AEW).

Over the course of his career, Foley worked for many wrestling promotions, including the World Wrestling Federation (WWF, now WWE), World Championship Wrestling (WCW), Eastern Championship Wrestling / Extreme Championship Wrestling (ECW), and Total Nonstop Action Wrestling (TNA), as well as numerous promotions in Japan. He is widely regarded as one of the biggest stars of the WWF's Attitude Era and headlined the 16th edition of its premier annual event, WrestleMania. He was inducted into the WWE Hall of Fame class of 2013.

Foley has wrestled under his real name and various personas. His main persona during his time in WCW and ECW from 1991 to 1996 was Cactus Jack, a dastardly, bloodthirsty and uncompromisingly physical brawler from Truth or Consequences, New Mexico, who wore cowboy boots and often used sharp metallic objects, such as barbed wire, thumbtacks, and trashcans. When Foley first appeared in the WWF in 1996, he debuted the persona known as Mankind, an eerie, masochistic, mentally deranged lunatic who was masked and spent his spare time dwelling in mechanical rooms. The following year, Foley debuted Dude Love, a relaxed, fun-loving, jive-talking, tie-dyed shirt-wearing hippie. These personas were known as the "Three Faces of Foley", with Cactus Jack making his debut in the WWF also in 1997. All three characters appeared in the 1998 Royal Rumble, making Foley the only competitor to enter the same Royal Rumble match three times under different personas.

Championships held by Foley include the WWF Championship, TNA World Heavyweight Championship, WWF Tag Team Championship, ECW (World) Tag Team Championship, WCW World Tag Team Championship, TNA Legends Championship, and WWF Hardcore Championship. Foley's Hell in a Cell match against The Undertaker is regarded as one of his most memorable and controversial matches and widely acknowledged as the greatest Hell in a Cell Match of all time. Foley's dedicated and physical style of wrestling led him to often participate in violent and brutal matches that involved him taking dangerous bumps and putting his body through a considerable physical toll, eventually earning him the moniker "the Hardcore Legend".

== Early life ==
Michael Francis Foley was born in Bloomington, Indiana, on June 7, 1965. He is of Irish descent, and has an older brother named John. Shortly after his birth, he moved with his family to the Long Island town of East Setauket, about 40 miles east of New York City, where he attended Ward Melville High School. At school, he wrestled and played lacrosse, and was a classmate and wrestling teammate of actor Kevin James. In October 1983, while a student at the State University of New York at Cortland, Foley hitchhiked over 200 miles to Madison Square Garden to see his favorite wrestler, "Superfly" Jimmy Snuka, in a steel cage match against Don Muraco. He has said that Snuka's flying body splash from the top of the cage inspired him to pursue a career in professional wrestling. He had a seat close to the front row and is visible in the video of the event. Foley graduated from SUNY Cortland in 1987 with a degree in communications.

== Professional wrestling career ==
=== Early career (1986–1989) ===
Foley formally trained at Dominic DeNucci's wrestling school in Freedom, Pennsylvania, driving several hours weekly from his college campus in Cortland, New York. He debuted on June 23, 1986, in Clarksburg, West Virginia, under the ring name "Cactus Jack Foley". In addition to appearing on DeNucci's cards, Foley and several other students also took part in some squash matches as jobbers for World Wrestling Federation TV tapings of Prime Time Wrestling, WWF Wrestling Challenge and Superstars of Wrestling, where Foley wrestled under the ring names "Jack Foley" and "Nick Foley." In another match (the second episode of Superstars), Foley and Les Thornton faced the British Bulldogs, during which the Dynamite Kid (who had a long earned reputation as a stiff worker in the ring) clotheslined Foley with such force that he was unable to eat solid food for several weeks. During these squash matches, Foley also faced other top-level talents at the time, such as Hercules Hernandez. His run would not last long, as he had not signed a contract with the promotion at the time. During this run, he was also billed from different hometowns and at different weights.

After two years of relative obscurity on the independent circuit, Foley began receiving offers from various regional promotions, including Bill Watts' Universal Wrestling Federation (UWF). In 1988, he joined the Memphis, Tennessee–based Continental Wrestling Association (CWA), where he teamed with Gary Young as part of the Stud Stable. Cactus and Young briefly held the CWA Tag Team Championship in late 1988. In November 1988, Foley left the CWA for the Texas-based World Class Wrestling Association (WCWA). In the WCWA, "Cactus Jack", billed as "Cactus Jack Manson", was a major part of Skandor Akbar's stable (the addition of "Manson" to Foley's name, due to its implied connection to Charles Manson, made him uncomfortable). Foley also won several titles, including the WCWA World Light Heavyweight Championship and WCWA World Tag Team Championship. He left the company in August 1989 after losing a loser leaves town match to Eric Embry in nine seconds. He then briefly competed in Alabama's Continental Wrestling Federation.

=== World Championship Wrestling (1989–1990) ===
In November 1989, Foley began wrestling for World Championship Wrestling (WCW) as "Cactus Jack Manson". His debut match, which aired on NWA World Championship Wrestling, saw him partnered with a one-time jobber named Rick Fargo to face the rising tag team of brothers Rick Steiner and Scott Steiner – two of the stiffest and toughest workers in wrestling at the time. After taking brutal bumps from both Steiner brothers and losing the match, Cactus then began fighting with Fargo, and then jumped nearly 12 feet (3.7 m) off the apron to elbow Fargo in the abdomen, per Kevin Sullivan's instructions. Lead WCW booker Ric Flair, Sullivan, and other WCW executives were impressed with this to the point that they offered Foley a contract, and Foley finally found some financial stability after years of hardship. Over the following months, Cactus Jack would generally team with jobbers. When the jobber would lose the match for the team, Cactus Jack would attack his partner, throw them out of the ring, and deliver his infamous ring apron flying elbow drop onto the concrete floor.

Foley's biggest match to date came in February 1990 against Mil Máscaras at Clash of the Champions X: Texas Shootout, where he took a particularly brutal bump backward off the 3 feet (0.91 m) high apron and landed on the concrete floor, with his head and back taking the impact. Later that month, he formed the villainous "Sullivan's Slaughterhouse" stable with Kevin Sullivan, Bam Bam Bigelow, and Buzz Sawyer and began a long feud with Norman the Lunatic and Mike Rotunda. At WrestleWar '90: Wild Thing that month, Jack lost to Norman the Lunatic. At the Capital Combat pay-per-view in May 1990, the Slaughterhouse lost to Norman the Lunatic and the Road Warriors in a six-man tag team match. It was during this period that Foley was involved in a car accident that resulted in the loss of his two front teeth, adding to the distinctive look for which he is famous. Foley left WCW in June 1990 after a conversation with booker Ole Anderson in which Anderson critiqued his style.

=== Various promotions; All Japan Pro Wrestling (1990–1991) ===
After leaving WCW in June 1990, Foley briefly returned to the United States Wrestling Association in Dallas, where he wrestled both as "Cactus Jack" and under a mask as "Zodiac #2". In July 1990, he wrestled for Tommy Dee at the Riverhead Raceway in Riverhead, New York, where he met his future wife Colette Christie. In September 1990, he began appearing with the Philadelphia, Pennsylvania–based Tri-State Wrestling Alliance (TWA), the precursor to Eastern Championship Wrestling, whose high-impact and violent wrestling style fit Foley well. In the same month he began wrestling for Herb Abrams' Reseda, California–based Universal Wrestling Federation (UWF), appearing on its UWF Fury Hour program. Foley wrestled for both the TWA and the UWF until March 1991.

In March 1991, Foley (as Cactus Jack) made his first excursion to Japan, wrestling for Giant Baba's All Japan Pro Wrestling (AJPW) promotion as part of its Champion Carnival round-robin tournament. He scored zero points in the tournament, losing to Jumbo Tsuruta, Danny Spivey, Johnny Smith, Toshiaki Kawada, Akira Taue, and Danny Kroffat. In addition to competing in the tournament, Foley and Texas Terminator Hoss wrestled several tag team matches, facing opponents including André the Giant, Dory Funk Jr., Terry Funk, and Johnny Ace. During one bout, Foley accidentally broke the elbow of Ace – the favorite wrestler of Giant Baba's wife – which Foley attributes to his not being invited back to AJPW, coupled with Baba's reservations about Foley's dress sense and wrestling style (which had drawn unwelcome comparisons to Frontier Martial-Arts Wrestling, regarded by Baba as garbage wrestling).

Returning to the United States in April 1991, Foley resumed wrestling for TWA and the UWF. In May 1991 at the TWA's "Spring Spectacular II" event, Foley faced Eddie Gilbert in a barbed wire match – a sight not often seen in professional wrestling in the United States, and an object Foley would often be associated with. Barbed wire would be wrapped with the ropes all around the ring, and Cactus and Gilbert both bled heavily; the match ended when Gilbert threw Cactus into the ring ropes and he did a hangman — a planned move where a wrestler's head is tangled between the top two ring ropes – only this time his head was tangled with the ring ropes and barbed wire. The following month, at UWF's Beach Brawl pay-per-view, Foley teamed with Bob Orton in a loss to Wet 'n' Wild (Steve Ray and Sunny Beach).

In July and August 1991, Foley appeared with the Dallas-based Global Wrestling Federation, where he formed a short-lived tag team with Makhan Singh known as "Cartel". Cartel took part in a tournament for the newly created GWF Tag Team Championship, losing to Chris Walker and Steve Simpson in the semi-finals. Foley also competed in a tournament for the GWF North American Heavyweight Championship, losing to Terry Gordy in the quarter-finals.

In August 1991 at TWA's Summer Sizzler event, Cactus Jack and Eddie Gilbert had three matches in one night: Cactus won a falls count anywhere match, lost a stretcher match, and then fought to a double disqualification in a cage match. These matches caught the attention of World Championship Wrestling promoters, in large part due to widespread photo circulation, and in August 1991, Foley re-joined WCW.

=== Return to World Championship Wrestling (1991–1994) ===
==== Early years (1991–1992) ====
Foley returned to WCW in August 1991 as "Cactus Jack", wrestling on house shows. On September 5, 1991, at Clash of the Champions XVI: Fall Brawl, Cactus Jack burst out of a giant box and attacked Sting, the then-WCW United States Heavyweight Champion. Unlike Jack's first stint in WCW, where his personality was more quiet, he was now outwardly maniacal; laughing hysterically, shrieking into the air while choking his opponents, and yelling his signature catchphrase, "Bang-Bang!". Over the following months, Jack and his ally, Abdullah the Butcher, feuded with Sting, with Jack frequently challenging Sting for the WCW United States Heavyweight title at house shows. At Halloween Havoc in October 1991, Sting, El Gigante, and the Steiner Brothers defeated Jack, Abdullah, Big Van Vader and The Diamond Studd in a Chamber of Horrors match. In November 1991 on WCW Power Hour, Sting defeated Jack in a "Submit or Surrender" match by referee's decision, ending their feud.

Jack subsequently began feuding with Van Hammer. At Starrcade '91: Battlebowl – The Lethal Lottery in December 1991, Jack and Buddy Lee Parker lost to Ricky Steamboat and Todd Champion in a "Battlebowl" qualifying match. In January 1992 at Clash of the Champions XVIII, Jack defeated Van Hammer in a falls count anywhere match. That same month, Jack's alliance with Abdullah ended after a series of miscommunications, leading to a series of matches between them. At SuperBrawl II in February 1992, Jack lost to Ron Simmons. At Beach Blast in June 1992, Jack faced Sting in a non-title falls count anywhere match, which Sting won; for a long time, Foley considered this the best match he ever worked.

At Clash of the Champions XX in September 1992, Cactus Jack unsuccessfully challenged Ron Simmons for the WCW World Heavyweight Championship. During the match, Jack suffered a torn abdominal muscle upon executing his diving elbow drop from the ring apron to the concrete floor. Jack - known for his pain tolerance - described it as the most painful injury he had ever suffered. Jack subsequently formed a short-lived stable with The Barbarian, Butch Reed, and Jake "The Snake" Roberts; Reed and Roberts left WCW soon over, but Jack spent several weeks acting as The Barbarian's manager, including accompanying him to ringside when he challenged Simmons for the WCW World Heavyweight Championship at Halloween Havoc in October 1992. At Starrcade '92: Battlebowl – The Lethal Lottery II in December 1992, Jack and Johnny B. Badd lost to Dan Spivey and Van Hammer in a "Battlebowl" qualifying match.

==== Feud with Big Van Vader (1993–1994) ====
After spending a year and a half with WCW as a heel, in January 1993 Cactus Jack transitioned into a fan favorite after engaging in a feud with Paul Orndorff, Harley Race, and Big Van Vader. Jack and Orndorff wrestled each other in a match for a spot on WCW World Heavyweight Champion Vader's team at Clash of the Champions XXII. After the match, Race and Orndorff beat up Jack. At the following Clash of Champions event, Cactus Jack helped Sting's team win the match. He engaged in a feud with Orndorff, winning a falls-count-anywhere match against Orndorff at SuperBrawl III. He then moved on to face Big Van Vader.

Cactus Jack wrestled Big Van Vader on April 6, 1993, winning by count-out after being severely beaten. Although talented and athletic, the 400 lb (180 kg) Vader was a notoriously stiff wrestler who had been trained in the Japanese "strong" style, and he hit so hard that most other wrestlers outright refused to work with him, out of fear of severe injury. However, Foley decided to continue his program with Vader, and as a result of Cactus's victory, in a rematch with Vader on April 24, the two executed a dangerous spot to sell a storyline injury. Harley Race removed the protective mats at ringside and Vader powerbombed Cactus onto the exposed concrete floor, causing a legitimate concussion and causing Foley to temporarily lose sensation in his left foot. While Foley was away, WCW ran an angle where Cactus Jack's absence was explained with a farcical comedy storyline in which he went crazy, was institutionalized, then escaped, and then developed amnesia. Foley had wanted the injury storyline to be serious and generate genuine sympathy for him before his return. The comedy vignettes that WCW produced instead were so bad that Foley jokes in Have a Nice Day that they were the brainchild of WCW executives who regarded a surefire moneymaking feud as a problem that needed to be solved. The angle was awarded "Most Disgusting Promotional Tactic" by the Wrestling Observer Newsletter.

In one of WCW's most violent and brutal matches of all time, Cactus Jack faced Vader in a Texas Deathmatch at Halloween Havoc in New Orleans in October 1993 after having a wheel being spun and the wheel stopping at this match choice. After 15 minutes of brawling and brutal spots which left both Cactus and Vader covered in blood, Race won the match for Vader by using a stun gun on Cactus, knocking him out. The level of violence and brutality involved in this match left the crowd and commentators Tony Schiavone and Jesse Ventura in stunned disbelief; both did not commentate much throughout the second half of the match. It also caused WCW, a promotion marketing itself as family friendly, to refuse to book Cactus Jack against Vader on a pay-per-view again.

Jack subsequently began teaming with Maxx Payne. At Battlebowl in November 1993, Jack was randomly paired with Vader to face Charlie Norris and Kane in a "Lethal Lottery" qualifying match; Jack and Vader defeated Kane and Norris to qualify for the Battlebowl battle royal, which was won by Vader. At Starrcade '93: 10th Anniversary, Jack and Payne defeated Shanghai Pierce and Tex Slazenger. At SuperBrawl IV in February 1994, Jack and Payne challenged WCW World Tag Team Champions the Nasty Boys, winning by disqualification (meaning the titles did not change hands).

Jack revived his feud with Vader in the spring of 1994. On March 16, 1994, during WCW's "Battle Stars 1994" tour of Germany, Cactus and Big Van Vader had one of the most infamous matches in wrestling history as part of WCW's European Cup tournament. Cactus began a hangman, but neither wrestler was aware that the ring ropes had been drawn extra tight before the event, and Cactus could barely move. When Cactus finally freed himself from the ropes and fell out of the ring, his right ear was badly split at the back. When Cactus re-entered the ring, the two wrestlers began trading blows. During this time, Vader smacked Cactus's face, causing the upper half of his ear to fall to the mat below. The two men continued wrestling as the referee picked up the ear and gave it to the ring announcer. Vader claimed for years after that the ear had come off during the botched Hangman maneuver, however in a WWE Network video, Vader admits that after seeing footage that he had indeed removed Cactus's ear.

Cactus Jack and Vader wrestled their final match in WCW – a Texas death match – in April 1994, a year to the day since their first match. During the bout, Vader once again powerbombed Cactus Jack on the floor, mirroring his actions of the prior year. Upon watching the match on WCW WorldWide, Foley was disgruntled by the commentary of Tony Schiavone and Bobby Heenan, which failed to reference the events of the prior year. Frustrated with new WCW boss Eric Bischoff and head booker Ric Flair's reluctance to work a storyline with Vader around losing his ear, Foley opted not to renew his contract when it expired, and he departed WCW for a second time in September 1994.

==== World Tag Team Champion; departure (1994) ====
At Spring Stampede in April 1994, Cactus Jack and Maxx Payne again challenged WCW World Tag Team Champions the Nasty Boys, this time in a violently brutal and chaotic tag team Chicago Street Fight, where Cactus Jack lost the match after he was shoved off a 3 feet (0.91 m) high stage and landed back first on the concrete. Later that month, Cactus Jack parted ways with Payne and formed a tag team with Kevin Sullivan, with the duo feuding with the Nasty Boys. Cactus Jack and Sullivan were scheduled to win the WCW World Tag Team Championship at Slamboree '94: A Legends' Reunion in May 1994. Foley had to choose between surgically reconstructing his ear or wrestling at the pay-per-view and winning the titles. Foley opted to wrestle and won his only championship in WCW, defeating the Nasty Boys in a "Broad Street Bully match" with Dave Schultz as the special guest referee.

During Cactus Jack's reign as WCW World Tag Team Champion, WCW shared a brief co-promotion with ECW during this time in which Cactus Jack represented WCW on ECW Hardcore TV as the WCW Tag Team Champion, culminating in a bout against Sabu at Hostile City Showdown on June 24, 1994. During a promo, Cactus Jack spat on his title belt and threw it to the ground to appeal to the ECW fans who shunned the mainstream promotions, an act for which he was later forced to apologize to booker Ric Flair.

Following successful defenses against the Nasty Boys and Harlem Heat, Cactus Jack and Sullivan lost the WCW World Tag Team Championship to Pretty Wonderful at Bash at the Beach in July 1994. After turning on Sullivan, Foley wrestled his final match for the company at Fall Brawl '94: War Games in September 1994, losing to Sullivan in a "loser leaves WCW" match.

=== Smoky Mountain Wrestling (1994) ===
In October 1994, Foley joined Smoky Mountain Wrestling (SMW) as Cactus Jack, causing Boo Bradley to lose the SMW Beat the Champ Television Championship. He often teamed with Brian Lee to feud with Bradley and Chris Candido. Cactus then began a crusade to rid Bradley of his valet Tamara Fytch. He ignited a feud between Candido and Bradley when he accused Candido of having sexual relations with Fytch. Cactus Jack left SMW in December 1994 before the feud was resolved.

=== Eastern Championship Wrestling / Extreme Championship Wrestling (1994–1996) ===
Cactus Jack's first appearance for the NWA-affiliated Eastern Championship Wrestling (ECW) promotion came on the May 31, 1994, episode, with Cactus revealed as Sabu's opponent for the Hostile City Showdown event on June 24 at the ECW Arena in Philadelphia, Pennsylvania. After being part of a talent exchange between ECW and WCW, Foley brought his WCW World Tag Team Championship belt and spit on it for a recorded ECW TV segment. Foley continued with ECW and began a feud with Sabu. Foley then began working the ECW tag team division on teams with Terry Funk, Mikey Whipwreck, and Kevin Sullivan. Cactus had two ECW World Tag Team Championship reigns with Whipwreck while in ECW, while at the same time he was training the young Whipwreck.

After a stint in Smoky Mountain Wrestling, Foley returned to ECW to feud with The Sandman. Funk returned to team up with Sandman, and during a particularly violent spot, the pair hit Cactus Jack with a kendo stick forty-six times in a barbed wire rope match. Cactus then defeated Funk at Hostile City Showdown 1995. Later, he repeatedly fought Sandman for the ECW World Heavyweight Championship. During their match at Barbed Wire, Hoodies & Chokeslams, Cactus knocked Sandman unconscious and was declared the winner. Referee Bill Alfonso, however, reversed his decision because the title cannot change hands by knockout. Foley then continued to have a series of violent encounters with the Sandman while challenging him and claiming that he had never been beaten in a Falls Count Anywhere match. He then started to team with Tommy Dreamer. According to Heyman, the hardcore style differentiated Foley from other traditional wrestlers, so in ECW, Foley was right at home. However, Foley did not enjoy working with Sandman, as Sandman was often intoxicated during matches and could not perform properly; drinking large amounts of beer and smoking cigarettes made up a large part of Sandman's overall gimmick.

But 1995 proved to be an interesting year for Foley, particularly during his time in ECW. Two incidents caused him to change his opinion of a promotion that most thought made him feel like he was at home. There was a sign in the front of the audience one night that said "Cane Dewey" with Foley's permission - a reference to using a Singapore cane on Foley's real-life eldest son, who was three years old then (Foley would sometimes mention his family in his promos). Foley then witnessed a botch in the opening match of Wrestlepalooza on August 5, 1995, where J. T. Smith did a dive, slipped off the ring apron and landed head-first on the concrete. Smith was so severely concussed that his head began swelling on the spot, and the audience's response to Smith's botch was "you fucked up". These incidents angered the normally jovial Foley so much that he furiously cut several memorable and scathing promos during this period to channel his intense frustration and anger toward ECW fans, who he felt asked too much from him and the ECW roster. Foley then began a gimmick where he criticized hardcore wrestling and sought to renounce his status as a hardcore wrestling icon, instead using a slow and technical wrestling style as a way to punish the audience. He said that he was on a mission to save his partner from making the mistake of trying to please bloodthirsty fans. Foley later admitted in an interview in 2015 that after Wrestlepalooza he became indifferent toward ECW and its fanbase.

The mismatched partnership between Cactus Jack and Dreamer lasted until Wrestlepalooza, when Cactus turned on Dreamer while they were teaming with the Pitbulls against Raven, Stevie Richards and the Dudley Brothers (Dudley Dudley and Big Dick Dudley). Cactus DDT'ed his partner and joined Raven's Nest, as he wished to serve Raven's "higher purpose". He remained one of Raven's top henchmen for the remainder of his time in ECW. On August 28, Cactus beat the previously undefeated 911. As part of Foley's heel gimmick, he began praising WWF and WCW on ECW television, which angered ECW fans. Their anger intensified once word began to spread that Foley was leaving to join the WWF (In Have a Nice Day, Foley recounted an incident where he asked an ECW roadie to sell T-shirts for him at an event held in a Queens, New York venue where he had been popular even as a heel; the man came back after being spat upon numerous times by angry fans, who made him fear for his life). Even when he tried to give sincere good-byes to the fans, Foley was met with chants of "You sold out" by the ECW fanbase everywhere he went. In February 1996 at CyberSlam, Cactus Jack was booked to face WWF hater Shane Douglas, who won after he handcuffed Cactus and then hit him with no fewer than ten consecutive chair shots. When he put Jack into a figure four leglock, this allowed Mikey Whipwreck to get into the arena and land one last hard chair shot to Cactus's face, knocking him unconscious.

Foley's last ECW match was against Whipwreck on March 9, 1996, at Big Ass Extreme Bash, and he recounts that he was not looking forward to it due to the increasingly hostile reactions he got even when he wasn't in character. The ECW fans, who knew that this was Foley's last match, finally returned his affection. They cheered him throughout the match and chanted, "Please don't go!". After the match, Foley told the audience that their reaction made everything worthwhile and made his exit by dancing with Stevie Richards and The Blue Meanie to Frank Sinatra's song "New York, New York". Foley has said that this exit was his favorite moment in wrestling.

=== International Wrestling Association of Japan (1995–1996) ===
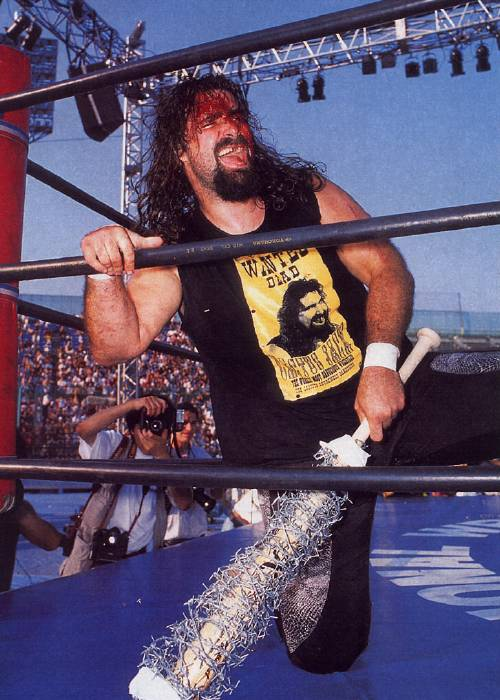
Foley as Cactus Jack at the IWA Kawasaki Dream, Tokyo, Japan in August 1995

In January 1995, Foley debuted in Víctor Quiñones's International Wrestling Association of Japan (IWA Japan). During his stint in Japan, Foley had the nickname "Tsunami Stopper". The level of violence and brutality in hardcore wrestling matches in Japan was at a much higher level than in Western promotions (except for ECW), something Western wrestlers were not accustomed to.

In his debut match on January 2, Jack teamed with Tracy Smothers to defeat Shoji Nakamaki and Terry Funk in a "No Ropes Barbed Wire Deathmatch" in Tokyo's Korakuen Hall. On January 6, Jack faced Funk in a "No Ropes Barbed Wire Scramble Bunkhouse Deathmatch" in Saitama, Saitama, just north of Tokyo in front of 150 people in a match that involved barbed wire as the ring ropes and objects set on fire. This turned out to be a particularly chaotic and brutal match where Foley and Funk mostly brawled in the seating area amongst the crowd, with folding chairs flying everywhere. After several brutal spots involving flaming chairs, flaming iron rods, Funk Hip-tossing Cactus into a flaming chair and Funk slamming Cactus's head into a wooden table, Funk reversed a Spinebuster by Cactus into a DDT and pinned him to win the match. In 2010 Foley wrote that, "looking back that match in Honjo is probably the performance I'm proudest of."

In April 1995, Jack began a feud with the chainsaw-wielding Leatherface, whom he had betrayed during a tag team match.

Perhaps the most notable matches of Foley's time in Japan were on August 20, 1995, where IWA organized a King of the Death Match tournament at their Kawasaki Dream event at the outdoor Kawasaki Stadium in its namesake city, which featured some of the bloodiest, most violent and most brutal matches of Foley's career. The tournament was seen live by tens of thousands of people, and each level of the tournament featured a new and deadly gimmick: Cactus Jack's first-round during the day was a barbed-wire baseball bat, thumbtack deathmatch, in which he defeated Terry Gordy; the second round was a barbed-wire board, bed of nails deathmatch where Cactus Jack defeated Shoji Nakamaki. At night against Terry Funk, the final was a barbed-wire rope, exploding barbed wire boards and exploding ring time bomb deathmatch, which Cactus Jack won with help from Tiger Jeet Singh. After the match, both men were covered in blood, ravaged by flesh cuts from the wire, and badly burned by the C-4 explosions. Foley later said that he only received $300 (equivalent to $634 in 2025) for the entire night.

On September 29, 1995, Jack and Tracy Smothers defeated the Headhunters for the IWA World Tag Team Championship in Yokohama. Their reign lasted until October 1, when they lost to Mr. Gannosuke and Tarzan Goto in Akita. Jack went on to unsuccessfully challenge Goto for the IWA World Heavyweight Championship.

In November to December 1995, Jack and Tiger Jeet Singh entered a round-robin tournament for the vacant NWA World Tag Team Championship. The tournament ended on December 9, when Jack and Singh lost to Gannosuke and Goto in Toda, Saitama.

Jack wrestled his final match for IWA Japan on June 4, 1996, teaming with Hiroshi Itakura, Keisuke Yamada, and Takashi Okano to defeat Gannosuke, Goto, Akinori Tsukioka, and Flying Kid Ichihara in Tokyo's Korakuen Hall.

=== World Wrestling Federation (1996–2001) ===
==== Feud with The Undertaker (1996–1997) ====
In 1996, at the persistence of Jim Ross, whom Foley had known in his days in WCW, WWF head Vince McMahon had Foley sign a contract with WWF, and this time it wasn't to use Foley as "enhancement talent". Ross insisted to hire Foley since WWF needed a new opponent for The Undertaker and Ross wanted to change the culture in the locker room. McMahon was not a fan of Cactus Jack and wanted to cover up Foley's face, so he was shown several designs for a new heel character–a man with a leather mask and chains, called "Mason the Mutilator". However, WWF decided that character as a whole was too dark and only kept the mask. Although interested in the concept of the character, Foley did not like the name, so he came up with the new name "Mankind", which McMahon liked and approved of.

Mankind was an eerie and mentally deranged miscreant who dwelled in the boiler rooms of buildings, constantly squealed (even throughout his matches), randomly shrieked "Mommy!", spoke to a rat named George, and regularly took to acts of masochism (such as by pulling out his hair). He donned a mask seemingly constructed of oddly shaped pieces of leather that were patched together with rivets. Mankind's finishing move was the "Mandible Claw". The move is based on the "Mandibular Nerve Pinch", a finishing move developed and utilized by former osteopathic physician and neurosurgeon-turned-wrestler, Sam Sheppard. The maneuver is a nerve hold applied when the aggressor plunges their middle and ring fingers into the opponent's mouth, under their tongue and into the soft tissue at the bottom of the mouth, while simultaneously forcing their jaw upwards with the thumb or palm of the same hand; clamping pressure is then applied between the fingers inside the mouth, and the thumb or palm under the jaw. If applied genuinely and correctly, it purportedly compresses the two nerves within the tissues of the mandible which render the opponent's jaw paralyzed - thus preventing the opponent from potentially breaking the hold by biting the aggressing wrestler's fingers. Its proper application is said to cause a significant amount of legitimate pain intense enough to inhibit the opponent's vision, and if cinched long enough, can force the opponent to black out. The creatively-inclined and dedicated Foley initially would prepare for playing Mankind by researching the character, often spending the night in the respective arena's boiler room and sometimes under the wrestling ring for the first few months. Some time after that, he could get into character almost instantly.

His catchphrase, ever perplexing, was "Have a nice day!". His association with boiler rooms led to his specialty match, dubbed the boiler room brawl. This specialty match is chaotic and dangerous with significant violent use of weaponry all taking place inside an arena's mechanical/boiler room. Combatants involved made use of everything from foreign objects to exposed metal piping with large bolts, concrete flooring, and solid electrical equipment - all allowed by the match's no disqualification and no count-out rules. The objective of the match, in most cases, was to escape the boiler room first.

On the April 1, 1996, episode of Monday Night Raw in San Bernardino, California, the day after WrestleMania XII, Mankind debuted on television and defeated Bob "Spark Plug" Holly, quickly moving into a feud with The Undertaker. At In Your House 7: Good Friends, Better Enemies later that month, The Undertaker defeated Mankind in a dark match. The two wrestlers then faced one another in a series of dark matches and house show matches until their first broadcast match against one another at King of the Ring in June 1996, where Mankind defeated The Undertaker using the Mandible Claw after The Undertaker's manager Paul Bearer accidentally struck The Undertaker with an urn. The feud culminated in the first-ever Boiler Room Brawl at SummerSlam 1996, and in addition to escaping the arena's boiler room, the winner would also have to reach the ring and take the urn from Paul Bearer. In more than 20 minutes of brawling in the boiler room, the backstage corridors, and the entrance ramp, both men taking some damage involving metal trash cans, tables, ladders, metal poles, hot coffee, and the exposed concrete floor. The Undertaker appeared to have won, but Paul Bearer refused to hand him the urn, allowing Mankind to win, thus (for the time being) ending the relationship between Bearer and The Undertaker. While Paul Bearer was Mankind's manager, Mankind referred to him as "Uncle Paul". Mankind then became the number one contender to face the then-WWF Champion Shawn Michaels at In Your House: Mind Games. Michaels won by disqualification via interference by Vader and The Undertaker.

The Mankind and Undertaker rivalry continued with the first-ever buried alive match at In Your House 11: Buried Alive. Undertaker won the match, but Paul Bearer, the Executioner, Mankind and other heels attacked The Undertaker and buried him alive. Afterward, The Undertaker challenged Mankind to a match at Survivor Series 1996, which the Undertaker won. The feud continued after another match at In Your House 14: Revenge of the 'Taker for the WWF World Heavyweight Championship, which Undertaker had won at WrestleMania 13. Undertaker was victorious in the match while Bearer would take a leave of absence.

==== Three Faces of Foley (1997–1998) ====
In April to May 1997, Jim Ross conducted a series of sit-down interviews with Mankind. During the interviews, Ross brought up the topic of Foley's home videos, the hippie-inspired character he played in them - Dude Love - and his tormented journey in wrestling. The interviews also affected the fans, who began cheering Mankind even though he was still a heel at this point.

On May 26, 1997, Stone Cold Steve Austin and Shawn Michaels won the WWF Tag Team Championship from Owen Hart and the British Bulldog, but the following month Michaels was injured and could no longer compete. Mankind tried to replace him, but Austin said he wanted "nothing to do with a freak" and resigned himself to facing Hart and the Bulldog alone on July 14. Halfway into the match, however, Foley debuted a new face persona known as "Dude Love", who helped Austin take the victory, becoming the new Tag Team Champions. Dude Love had some new and renamed moves, such as the "Love Handle" (a renamed Mandible Claw) and "Sweet Shin Music" (a simple kick to the shins, a play on Shawn Michaels's superkick finishing move). Austin and Foley vacated their tag team titles when Austin suffered a neck injury in a match at SummerSlam in East Rutherford, New Jersey.

In August 1997, Dude Love began feuding with Hunter Hearst Helmsley. That month, at SummerSlam, Mankind defeated Helmsley in a steel cage match. The feud led to a falls count anywhere match on the September 22, 1997 episode of Raw is War. One of Foley's most memorable vignettes aired before the match began, in which Dude Love and Mankind discussed who should wrestle the upcoming match. Eventually, "they" decided that it should be Cactus Jack, and Foley's old character made his WWF debut as a face. Cactus Jack won the match with a piledriver through a table. At WWF One Night Only later that month, Helmsley defeated Dude Love.

In September 1997, Foley (as Mankind) wrestled Sabu at Terry Funk's WrestleFest, an event organized to mark the retirement of Foley's friend Terry Funk. Funk, however, broke his retirement soon after the event.

At Survivor Series in November 1997, Mankind lost to Kane in Kane's debut match.

In December 1997, Funk joined the WWF as "Chainsaw Charlie", aligning himself with Foley. At the 1998 Royal Rumble, Foley participated under all three personas, Cactus Jack (1st entrant), Mankind (16th), and Dude Love (28th). Charlie and Cactus defeated the New Age Outlaws at WrestleMania XIV in a dumpster match to win the tag team titles (which was originally supposed to be a barbed-wire rope match- but this often violent and bloody match was scrapped due to the high-profile appearance of Mike Tyson taking place at the event). The next night, however, Vince McMahon stripped them of the belts, citing that Charlie and Cactus had put the Outlaws in a random backstage dumpster and not the original dumpster brought ringside. He scheduled a rematch in a steel cage, which the Outlaws won with help from their new allies D-Generation X (DX).

On April 6, 1998, Foley turned heel when Cactus explained that the fans would not see him anymore because they did not appreciate him, and only cared about Stone Cold Steve Austin. In the midst a hard-fought match with Terry Funk in Albany, fans started to leave the arena a minute or so before it finished. Ring announcer Howard Finkel announced that Austin, who was the hottest wrestler in the WWE at the time, would be making an appearance. The crowd exploded at the news, and many rushed back to their seats. Foley later admitted that this crowd reaction emotionally hurt him, feeling that his hard work could not compete with Austin's popularity and that he would be just another wrestler to face the company's megastar. Vince McMahon explained to Austin the next week that he would face a "mystery" opponent at Unforgiven: In Your House. That opponent turned out to be Dude Love, who won the match by disqualification, meaning that Austin retained the title. McMahon, displeased with the outcome, required Foley to prove he deserved another shot at Austin's title with a number one contender's match against his former partner, Terry Funk. The match was both the WWF's first-ever "hardcore match" and the first time that Foley wrestled under his real name. Foley won, and after the match, a proud McMahon came out to Dude Love's music and presented Foley with the Dude Love costume. At Over the Edge: In Your House, Dude Love took on Austin for the title. McMahon designated his subordinates Gerald Brisco and Pat Patterson as the timekeeper and ring announcer respectively and made himself the special referee. However, the Undertaker came to ringside to ensure McMahon called the match fairly, and with his presence Dude Love lost the match. Foley, wearing street clothing as himself, was ultimately "fired" by McMahon on the June 1 episode of Raw.

Subsequent episodes of Raw saw a change in Foley, who had now reverted to a version of his Mankind persona (albeit, less deranged). This saw him adopt new ring attire – pairing untucked, collared shirts with his original Mankind tights. On June 15, 1998, teaming with Kane in a Tag Team Royal Rumble match, Mankind debuted his now-familiar white dress shirt with a loose necktie look. The character would subsequently reignite his feud with The Undertaker. At King of the Ring 1998 in Pittsburgh's Civic Arena on June 28, the two performed in the third Hell in a Cell match, which became one of the most notable matches in professional wrestling history. Foley received numerous injuries and took two dangerous and highly influential bumps – the first being tossed off the top of the 16 feet (4.9 m) high Cell by The Undertaker, crashing through the Spanish announcer's wooden table and landing on the arena's concrete floor. Barely five minutes after the first fall, Foley, with a separated shoulder, climbed back up to the top of the Cell structure after Terry Funk and others tried to stop him. The second bump, which was an unplanned mishap, occurred when The Undertaker chokeslammed Foley and the fenced panel Foley landed on broke and gave way. Foley then plunged 13 feet (4.0 m) through the Cell and landed on the ring mat, losing a tooth. Mankind lost the match to conclude their storyline.

==== WWF Champion (1998–2000) ====
In summer 1998, Mankind teamed with Kane - collectively securing the WWF Tag Team Championship on two separate occasions - and engaged in various feuds with Kane, Stone Cold Steve Austin, and The Undertaker. Foley decided that crowds might respond better if Mankind were more of a comedy character, and so he abandoned the tortured soul characteristics and became more of a goofy, broken-down oaf. He began the transition into this character following SummerSlam in 1998 after Kane turned on him and the two lost the tag team championships.

The following month, Foley began an angle with Vince McMahon, with Mankind trying to be a friend to the hated Mr. McMahon character. On the October 5 episode of Raw is War, while McMahon was in a hospital nursing wounds suffered at the hands of The Undertaker and Kane, Mankind arrived with a female clown called Yurple in an attempt to cheer him up. Having succeeded only in irritating McMahon, Mankind then took a disgusting sock off his foot and placed it on his hand to create a sock puppet named "Mr. Socko". Intended to be a one-time joke and suggested by Al Snow, Socko became an overnight sensation. Mankind began putting the sock on his hand before applying his finisher, the Mandible Claw, stuffing a smelly sock in the mouths of opposing wrestlers. Mankind also acted as a puppeteer, having the sock “speak” in a high-pitched voice. The sweatsock became massively popular with the fans, mainly because it was marketed (mostly by Jerry "The King" Lawler during the events) as being dirty, smelly, sweaty, repulsive, and vile. McMahon manipulated Mankind, who saw the WWF owner as a father figure, into doing his bidding. McMahon created the WWF Hardcore Championship and awarded it to Mankind, making him the first-ever champion of the hardcore division. Mankind was then pushed as the favorite to win the WWF Championship at Survivor Series, as McMahon appeared to be influencing the tournament so that Mankind would win. He and The Rock both reached the finals, where McMahon showed his true colors. As The Rock placed Mankind in the Sharpshooter, McMahon ordered the timekeeper to ring the bell even though Mankind did not submit, a reference to the infamous Montreal Screwjob occurring just the year prior. As a result of the Survivor Series, Mankind officially turned face, while The Rock turned heel and became the crown jewel in McMahon's new faction, The Corporation.

After weeks of trying to get his hands on The Corporation, Mankind received a title shot against The Rock at Rock Bottom: In Your House. Mankind won the match by using his mandible claw hold (with the Mr. Socko prop on his hand) and the referee declared The Rock had become unresponsive. But McMahon overruled the title change because Mankind didn't keep his pre-match promise to make The Rock submit. After several weeks of going after The Corporation, Mankind defeated The Rock to win his first WWF Championship on December 29 in Worcester, Massachusetts. The taped show was broadcast on January 4, 1999; thus that is the date WWE recognizes as beginning the title run. Having title changes on broadcast television rather than pay-per-view was uncommon in professional wrestling, but because of the Monday Night War, television ratings became more important. The head of rival promotion WCW Eric Bischoff, attempting to take advantage of the fact that their show Monday Nitro aired live while Mankind's title victory was taped the week before, had announcer Tony Schiavone reveal the ending of the Mankind-Rock match before it aired. He then added sarcastically, "That's gonna put some butts in the seats." The move backfired for WCW, as Nielsen ratings showed that Raw won the ratings battle that night, despite the Hulk Hogan vs. Kevin Nash main event which led to the reformation of the New World Order (nWo). Foley took personal pride in observing that ratings indicate large numbers of viewers switched from Nitro to Raw to see him win the title. It was a significant turn of direction between the warring companies as WCW would never beat the WWF in the television ratings again going forward.

Mankind lost the WWF Championship to The Rock in an "I Quit" match (a type of submission match) 20 days later at the Royal Rumble at the Arrowhead Pond in Anaheim, California, near Los Angeles, in what is regarded as one of the company's most brutal matches. During the match, Foley took several violent and dangerous attacks from The Rock all over the arena, including repeated steel chair shots to the head and a fall from the stands onto solid electrical objects, which sparked upon impact. Although chair shots to the head were commonplace in the Attitude Era, the most a wrestler would take in a single ten-minute match was two, or sometimes three, with their hands in front of their head to ease the blow and lessen a chance of a concussion. However, Foley had taken eleven in the span of two and a half minutes, all unprotected, because he had been handcuffed just before The Rock began his repeated onslaught. Foley was originally supposed to take five chair shots to the head with the final match-ending shot being two-thirds up the entrance ramp. After the sixth shot, Foley was still at ringside and, even after Foley signaled to The Rock to hit him in the back, The Rock decided to keep to the match's brutal tone based on Foley's previous on-the-fly calling of similar shots on the spot. He bludgeoned Foley five more times in the head until they got to the two-thirds mark. This match is featured in Barry Blaustein's documentary Beyond the Mat, which shows the impact the match had on Foley, his family, and even the rest of the audience at ringside. At one point Foley's wife Colette and five-year-old daughter Noelle both cried and screamed in horror, with Noelle believing her father was dying as The Rock pummeled Foley with repeated chair shots. The match at this point had become so brutal that some people in the audience sitting in the front furiously showed signs of disapproval at The Rock and shouted at him and the referee to stop the match. The match ended after Mankind lost consciousness, and The Rock's allies played a recording of Mankind saying "I Quit" from an earlier interview he did with Shane McMahon.

Mankind won the title back in a rematch a week later on Halftime Heat, which aired during halftime of Super Bowl XXXIII, in the WWF's first-ever empty arena match in Tucson, Arizona, on January 31. After 20 minutes of brawling in the ring, the empty grandstands, a kitchen, the arena's hallways, an office, and the catering hall, Mankind took a sock off his foot and stuffed it into The Rock's mouth. He eventually used a forklift to pin a subdued Rock in a basement loading area. The two then competed in a Last Man Standing match at St. Valentine's Day Massacre: In Your House, which ended without either being able to respond to a ten count, meaning that Mankind retained the title. The next night, Mr. McMahon booked a ladder match for the championship, which The Rock won with help from The Big Show. Mankind would go on to WrestleMania XV to defeat The Big Show and again at Backlash a month later in a violent and brutal Boiler Room Brawl (the first in the WWF since July 1996), where the objective of the match had been simplified from the 1996 match to only having to escape the boiler room. Foley briefly reverted to his Cactus Jack persona for a hardcore handicap match against Ministry of Darkness members Viscera and Mideon on May 10, 1999, which Cactus won, entering wielding two basketballs as weapons. In that same month, Big Show would align with fellow former Corporation members Mankind, Test, and Shamrock in a collective known as "The Union". They took on part of the newly fused Corporate Ministry at Over the Edge. Foley took some time away to undergo knee surgery and was written off television with a kayfabe blow dealt by Triple H.

In August 1999, Foley returned after a three-month absence recovering from knee surgery to resume his feud with Triple H, who had kayfabe injured Foley's left knee with his sledgehammer. On an episode of Raw is War, Mankind drew with Triple H in a match for the number one contender for the WWF Championship, which resulted in a Triple Threat match between Steve Austin, Triple H and Mankind at SummerSlam where Mankind won the WWF Championship for a third time by pinning the reigning champion Austin. Mankind's win led to an enraged Triple H to assault Austin, justifying Austin's absence while he healed a knee injury. The next night on Raw is War, Triple H defeated Mankind to win his first WWF championship. A feud then developed between Mankind and Triple H. This included Triple H defeating Mankind in another Boiler Room Brawl on the September 23 edition of SmackDown!, as part of a five-match "gauntlet" challenge set upon Triple H by Vince McMahon. It was around this time that Foley began to realize he was going to have to retire soon. In addition to the massive physical toll he had inflicted on his body, Foley began to develop cognitive problems such as forgetting simple bodily motions and trouble remembering how to write and spell basic words. Foley's last match was meant to be a tag team bout with Al Snow in November 1999. With the WWF having to go on devoid of their biggest star Stone Cold Steve Austin at the time (who was out with a broken neck), Foley felt that the company would suffer too badly if another one of its top talents disappeared from the roster, although The Rock was surging in popularity. Foley, even in the poor condition he was in, decided to endure for a few more months until Austin returned.

Around the latter part of the year, Foley and The Rock patched up their friendship and teamed up to form a comedy duo titled the Rock 'n' Sock Connection, becoming one of the most popular acts during that time. The pair won the tag team titles on three occasions. One notable match was a Buried Alive encounter in September that pitted the Rock 'n' Sock Connection against The Undertaker and The Big Show, who were out for revenge after losing the tag titles one week earlier. The Big Show tossed Mankind off the stage, landing him hard on the dirt and falling into the grave with Mankind travelling nearly 25 feet (7.6 m) in total. Foley then helped Raw is War achieve its highest ratings ever with a segment featuring himself (as Mankind) and The Rock. The "This Is Your Life" segment aired on September 27, 1999, and received an 8.4 rating, with Yurple the Clown making another appearance.

Mankind received a title shot against Triple H on an episode of Raw is War on October 25, 1999. Mankind appeared to have the title won after he forced Triple H to pass out by ramming a sock down his gullet, but Val Venis interfered and cost Mankind the match. Mankind continued his feud with Triple H when he was slated to have the last Boiler Room Brawl match with "Santa Claus". He ended up being attacked by the Mean Street Posse, Billy Gunn and Road Dogg, all of whom dressed up as Santa Claus. Mankind defeated all five of the Santa Clauses until Triple H appeared as a sixth Santa Claus and brought down Mankind, escaping the Boiler Room and winning as the eponymous character. On the December 27, 1999, episode of Raw is War, Mick Foley and the Rock had a "Pink Slip on a Pole match", where whoever was first to grab the pink slip first stayed in WWF and the loser having to leave. Foley would lose before then showing up as Mankind on the January 13, 2000, edition of SmackDown!. He then fell back into his Cactus Jack persona in front of the crowd to promote Cactus Jack facing Triple H for the WWF Championship at Royal Rumble, in a Street Fight. Cactus used a 2x4 wrapped in barbed wire and thumbtacks - trademark weapons from his pre-WWF days - but Triple H won the match after delivering two Pedigrees, the second slamming Cactus face-first onto a pile of tacks. The feud culminated with a rematch at No Way Out in a Hell in a Cell match, where stipulations held that Cactus could not use foreign metallic objects he utilized at the Royal Rumble. It was also stated that if he did not win the title, Foley had to retire from wrestling. During the match, they had made their way onto the top of the cell and Cactus was preparing to piledrive Triple H onto a barbed wire 2x4 on fire, but Triple H reversed it into a backdrop. It caused the cage to break, and Cactus fell through the canvas. Triple H then pinned an exhausted Cactus, winning the match and ending Foley's career. Foley left for a few weeks, but returned at the request of Linda McMahon to wrestle for the title by replacing Chris Jericho's spot at the main event of WrestleMania 2000 against Triple H, The Rock and Big Show. Triple H won the match - pinning Foley in a third consecutive pay-pay-view main event - and Foley did not wrestle again for four years.

==== Commissioner and departure (2000–2001) ====
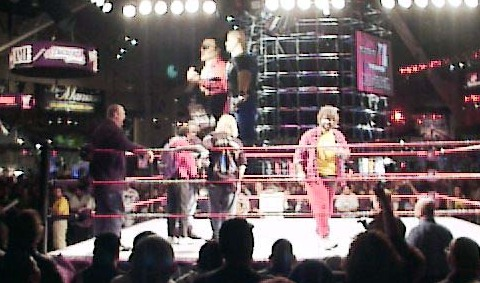
Foley at WrestleMania X-Seven Fan Axxess in 2001

After retiring from active competition, Foley served as storyline WWF Commissioner under his real name rather than one of his personas. Foley has said that he intended for his Commissioner Foley character to be a "role model for nerds," cracking lame jokes and making no attempt to appear tough or scary. He also had a knack during this time to have no one spot for his office; rather, Foley would have an office in all sorts of odd places (for example, closets). Foley turned getting cheap pops into something of a catchphrase, as he shamelessly declared at each WWF show that he was thrilled to be "right here in (whatever city in which he was performing (e.g., New York))!" punctuated with an intentionally cheesy thumbs-up gesture. During this time, Commissioner Foley engaged in rivalries with Kurt Angle, Edge and Christian, and Vince McMahon without actually wrestling them. He left the position in December 2000 after being "fired" onscreen by McMahon during which he received a brutal beat down at the hands of Angle, Edge and Christian.

Foley made a surprise return on the Raw just before WrestleMania X-Seven and announced that he would be the special guest referee in the match between Mr. McMahon and his son Shane at WrestleMania. After WrestleMania, Foley made sporadic appearances on WWF programming throughout the middle of the year, at one point introducing Minnesota Governor Jesse Ventura during a taping of Raw in the state as a foil to Mr. McMahon, as well as serving as the guest referee for the Earl Hebner versus Nick Patrick referee match and a tag-team bra and panties match between WWF wrestlers Lita and Trish Stratus vs. WCW wrestlers Stacy Keibler and Torrie Wilson at the Invasion pay-per-view. Foley returned as commissioner in October 2001, near the end of The Invasion angle. During this brief tenure, Foley had the opportunity to shoot on the WWF's direction and how dissatisfied he was with it. Saying that there were far too many championships in the company, he booked unification matches before the final pay-per-view of the storyline, Survivor Series. After Survivor Series, he ended his commissionership at Vince McMahon's request and left the company.

=== Frontier Martial-Arts Wrestling (1996, 1997) ===
While under contract to the WWF, Foley appeared with Atsushi Onita's Frontier Martial-Arts Wrestling promotion on May 5, 1996, at the FMW 7th Anniversary Show. He defeated W*ING Kanemura in a "Caribbean barbed wire barricade glass deathmatch" in Kawasaki Stadium.

Foley returned to FMW on April 29, 1997, for the FMW 8th Anniversary Show, which took place in Yokohama Arena. He teamed with Funk Masters of Wrestling (Terry Funk and The Gladiator) in a loss to Onita, Kanemura, and Masato Tanaka in a "Western Texas Tornado Street Fight".

=== Various promotions; Ring of Honor (2003–2005) ===
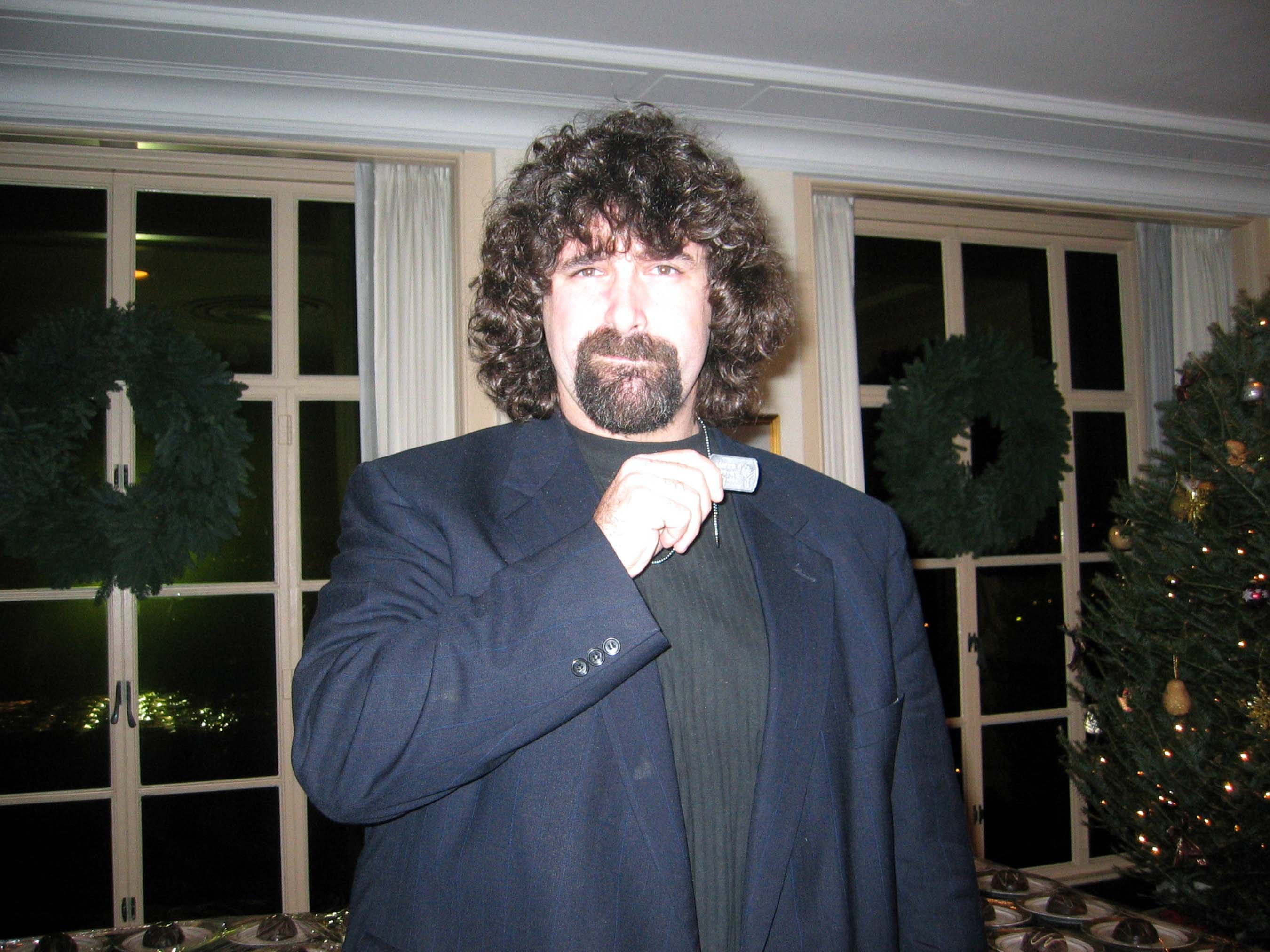
Mick Foley in 2004

On December 12, 2003, Foley served as the special guest referee for a Terry Funk vs. Dusty Rhodes match promoted by the International Wrestling Cartel.

On May 8, 2004, Foley returned to Japan for the first time in seven years. He lost to Toshiaki Kawada for the Triple Crown title at Hustle's Hustle 3 pay per view in Yokohama.

On September 11, 2004, Foley made his debut for Ring of Honor (ROH) and cut a promo, praising ROH and referring to it as "Ring of Hardcore", thus establishing himself as a face. On October 15, Foley returned to ROH where he confronted Ricky Steamboat, who claimed that traditional wrestling was better than hardcore wrestling. During this confrontation Foley also cut a scathing promo on Ric Flair, as part of his real-life animosity over Flair referring to Foley as a "glorified stuntman" in his autobiography. The next day, both Foley and Steamboat cut promos on each other, leading to a match between two teams of wrestlers handpicked by both men, with Nigel McGuiness and Chad Collyer representing Steamboat and Dan Maff and B. J. Whitmer representing Foley, which was won by McGuiness and Collyer. On November 6, Foley teased a heel turn when he called ROH Champion Samoa Joe "softcore". On December 26 at ROH's Final Battle event, Foley returned to ROH and had his final confrontation with Ricky Steamboat, where the two made peace. On January 15, 2005, Foley turned heel after being confronted by Samoa Joe and hit Joe over the head with a steel chair. On February 19, Foley resumed his feud with Samoa Joe in ROH, teasing a return to the ring but instead choosing Vordell Walker to fight Joe. After Joe defeated Walker, Foley introduced his "backup plan" New Cactus Jack to fight Joe in a second match, which Joe won as well. On July 8, Foley returned to ROH as a face, confronting ROH Champion CM Punk, who had turned heel and mocked ROH and the championship after he had signed with WWE and threatened to take the title with him to WWE. Foley acted as a direct line to Vince McMahon, attempting to convince Punk to defend his title one last time on McMahon's orders before he departed from ROH. On August 20, Foley returned to ROH again, as a face, to rescue Jade Chung from Prince Nana. Foley was then attacked from behind by Alex Shelley and The Embassy until Austin Aries and Roderick Strong chased them off. Foley made his final regular appearance with ROH on September 17, when he was in A.J. Styles' corner in a match against Embassy member Jimmy Rave, which Styles won. Afterward, Foley spoke highly of Ring of Honor.

Foley teamed up with Shane Douglas on May 7, 2005, when they defeated Al Snow and D'Lo Brown for the Tri-Cities Tag titles at the Mark Curtis Memorial Reunion in Johnson City, Tennessee. On August 27, 2005, Foley teamed with Terry Funk and his brother Dory Jr. as they lost to The Midnight Express, Bobby Eaton, Dennis Condrey and Stan Lane at WrestleReunion 2.

On November 12, 2005, Foley worked in England for Universal Uproar in Coventry teaming with The Sandman, Steve Corino and Paul Travell as they defeated Alex Shane, Martin Stone, Iceman and Stixx in a Hardcore Elimination match.

=== Return to WWE (2003–2008) ===
==== Feud with Randy Orton (2003–2004) ====
Foley returned to WWE to referee the Hell in a Cell match between Triple H and Kevin Nash at Bad Blood on June 15, 2003. On the June 23 episode of Raw broadcast from Madison Square Garden, he was honored for his achievements in the ring and presented with the retired WWE Hardcore Championship belt. The evening ended with Foley taking a beating and kicked down a flight of stairs by Randy Orton and Ric Flair. On the December 1 episode of Raw, Foley returned to replace Stone Cold Steve Austin as co-general manager of the Raw brand. He soon grew tired of the day-to-day travel and left his full-time duties to write and spend time with his family. In the storyline, Foley was afraid to wrestle a match with WWE Intercontinental Champion Randy Orton on the December 15 episode of Raw and walked out of the match rather than face him, the result of the match was ruled a draw. After Foley walked backstage, Orton confronted him asking why he walked out of the match and calling him a coward before spitting in his face. Foley walked out of the arena afterward.

Foley returned briefly to wrestling, competing in the Royal Rumble match at the Royal Rumble on January 25, 2004, and eliminating both Orton and himself with his trademark Cactus Jack clothesline. He and The Rock reunited as the Rock 'n' Sock Connection and lost a handicap match to Evolution at WrestleMania XX on March 14. Foley and Orton continued to feud, culminating in a hardcore match for the WWE Intercontinental Championship at Backlash on April 18, where a thumbtack-covered Orton defeated Foley, as his Cactus Jack persona, to retain the title after hitting Foley with his signature move, the RKO onto a barbed-wire covered baseball bat. Foley regards this match as possibly the best of his career.

==== Various feuds (2005–2006) ====
Foley appeared as a color commentator at WWE's ECW One Night Stand on June 12, 2005, and subsequently renewed his contract with WWE. Foley returned in a match where fans were able to vote on which persona he would appear as—Mankind, Dude Love, or Cactus Jack—against Carlito at Taboo Tuesday on November 1. The fans voted for Mankind, who went on to defeat Carlito- this was the last time Foley ever wrestled as Mankind. On the February 16, 2006 episode of Raw, Foley returned to referee the WWE Championship match between Edge and John Cena. After Cena won, Edge attacked Foley, and the following week, Foley (who from now on would resemble Cactus Jack in his wrestling show appearances and matches, but would still wrestle under his own name) challenged Edge to a hardcore match at WrestleMania 22 on April 2. In the intensely brutal match, the heavily bloodied and thumbtack-covered Edge defeated Foley after spearing him through a flaming table, where both performers suffered second-degree burns after anti-flame material was sweated off of both performers and was not applied to the flaming table, at their own request. In the weeks after the match, an "impressed" Foley aligned himself with Edge against the newly rejuvenated ECW on the May 8 episode of Raw, turning heel in WWE for the first time since 1998. At ECW One Night Stand on June 11, Foley, Edge and Lita defeated Terry Funk, Tommy Dreamer and Beulah McGillicutty in a violent and brutal tag-team hardcore match, which included a spot where Funk hit Foley with a barbed wire 2x4 plank lit on fire, and the flame latched onto Foley, and he then fell onto a plywood board covered in more barbed wire.

Foley then engaged in a storyline rivalry with Ric Flair, inspired by real-life animosity between them. In Have a Nice Day!, Foley wrote that Flair was "every bit as bad on the booking side of things as he was great on the wrestling side of it." In response, Flair wrote in his autobiography that Foley was "a glorified stuntman" and that he was able to climb the ladder in the WWF only because he was friends with the bookers. The two had a backstage confrontation at a Raw event in December 2004 in Huntsville, Alabama, but Foley has said that they have largely reconciled. To spark the feud, Flair again called Foley a "glorified stuntman" and Foley called Flair a "washed-up piece of crap" and challenged him to a match. The result was a Two-out-of-Three Falls match at Vengeance on June 25, where Flair beat Foley in two straight falls. The two then wrestled in an intensely brutal and bloody "I Quit" match at SummerSlam on August 20. In the beginning of the match, Foley stuffed his smelly gym sock, Mr. Socko, down Flair's gullet to apply the Mandible claw. Flair nearly passed out from the sock's foul smell, but since the match was an "I Quit" match, Foley was unable to capitalize. Flair, who was covered in blood, thumbtacks and cuts from barbed wire, won the match when he forced Foley to quit by threatening Melina with a barbed-wire bat. On the August 21 episode of Raw, Foley kissed Vince McMahon's buttocks as part of McMahon's "Kiss My Ass Club" gimmick after he threatened to fire Melina. Shortly thereafter, Melina betrayed Foley and announced that he was fired.

==== Sporadic appearances, SmackDown color commentator and second departure (2007–2008) ====
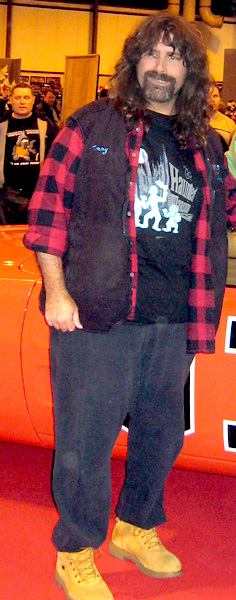
Mick Foley in 2007

Seven months later, Foley returned on the March 5, 2007 episode of Raw with the storyline being that he tricked McMahon into giving him his job back, turning face once again. At Vengeance on June 24, Foley wrestled in a WWE Championship Challenge match involving WWE Champion John Cena, Randy Orton, King Booker, and Bobby Lashley. Cena retained by pinning Foley. On the October 29 episode of Raw, Foley made an appearance on as the special guest referee for a match between Jonathan Coachman and Mr. McMahon's storyline illegitimate son Hornswoggle. Foley then made an appearance on SmackDown! the same week, where he defeated Coachman with Hornswoggle as the special guest referee. On the January 7, 2008, episode of Raw, Foley and his tag team partner Hornswoggle qualified for the Royal Rumble on January 27 by defeating The Highlanders, but Foley was eliminated by Triple H during the Royal Rumble match.

Foley debuted as a color commentator for SmackDown alongside Michael Cole at Backlash on April 27, replacing Jonathan Coachman. On the August 1 episode of SmackDown, Foley was kayfabe attacked by Edge during Edge's promo for his Hell in a Cell match against The Undertaker at SummerSlam on August 17. Foley sat out the August 8 SmackDown to sell his recovery from the injuries. Tazz filled in for Foley as a color commentator on SmackDown, while Raw wrestler Matt Striker filled in for Tazz on ECW. Foley told Long Island Press pro wrestling columnist Josh Stewart in August 2008 that "creatively, the announcing job wasn't working out too well". He expanded with Dave Meltzer on the Observer radio show that the environment was creatively frustrating. Foley allowed his contract with WWE to expire on September 1, 2008, and quietly left the company.

=== Total Nonstop Action Wrestling / Impact Wrestling (2008–2011, 2020) ===
==== Championship reigns (2008–2009) ====
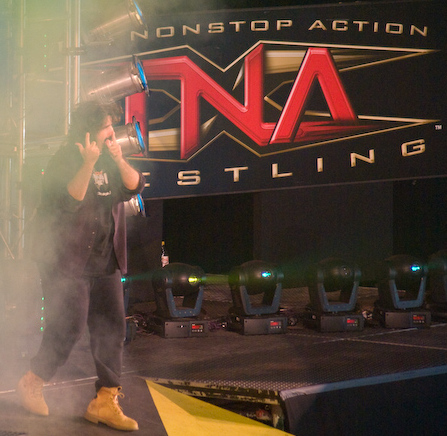
Foley at Bound for Glory IV

On September 3, 2008, Foley's agency, Gillespie Talent, issued a press release that stated Foley had signed a short-term deal with Total Nonstop Action Wrestling (TNA). Foley claimed in the statement to be "very excited about the specifics of this agreement and the potential it holds". Foley made his TNA debut on September 5, at a TNA house show giving a short speech about how he loved the product, in which he also belittled WWE. The official TNA Wrestling website featured an image of a smiley face with a variation of Foley's catchphrase, "Have a nice day!" (and, before No Surrender on September 14, "Have a nice Sunday!").

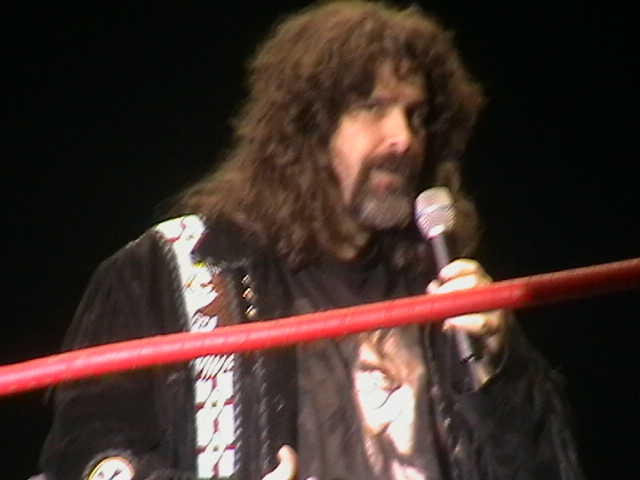
Foley at a TNA house show in Dublin, Ireland in January 2009

On the September 18 edition of Impact!, Foley made his first televised appearance for TNA, where Jeff Jarrett introduced him to the audience on the arena's video wall. Two weeks later, Foley made his full television debut in a promo making comments about the WWE roster, Vince McMahon and Kurt Angle. At Bound for Glory IV on October 12, he was the special guest enforcer for Jarrett and Angle's match. Later, on Impact!, Foley said goodbye, but was then approached by Jeff Jarrett with a new offer; he later indicated that they had come to terms on a new contract and would make a major announcement the next week. On the October 23 episode of Impact!, Foley announced that he was now co-owner of TNA along with Jarrett, just after Kurt Angle headbutted him.

On the November 27 episode of Impact!, TNA presented the Turkey Bowl. Alex Shelley ended up being pinned by Rhino, and Foley handed Rhino the check. Afterward, the defeated Shelley had to put on a Turkey Suit in compliance with the match rules, albeit with much refusal. However, Shelley "flipped off" Foley and proceeded to beat him up. In the aftermath, Mick mentioned that Shelley is lucky he still has his job. The Main Event Mafia's Kevin Nash, Booker T, and Scott Steiner were going to take on Brother Devon, A.J. Styles, and Mick Foley in his debut matchup at Genesis on January 11, 2009. Nash, however, suffered a legitimate staph infection and missed Genesis. He was replaced by Cute Kip. Foley got the pin when he hit Scott Steiner with a double arm DDT onto a chair.

At Lockdown on April 19, he defeated Sting to win the TNA World Heavyweight Championship for his first-ever championship in TNA, and his fourth World title overall. At Sacrifice on May 24, Foley put his title on the line against Kurt Angle, Jeff Jarrett and Sting. During the match, Foley stuffed a dirty old sock into the mouths of Jarrett and Sting, but Sting pinned Angle to become the new leader of the Main Event Mafia. Due to the rules of the match, Foley retained the title.

Foley had also stated on Impact! tapings that if he retained the TNA World Heavyweight Title at the King of the Mountain match at Slammiversary on June 21, he would only put the title up in a match once a year. However, he lost the title to Kurt Angle in the King of The Mountain match at Slammiversary. He received a rematch at Victory Road on July 19, commenting he had only submitted once in his career (to Terry Funk, in a spinning toe hold) and swore he'd never do it again. He lost the match when Angle forced him to submit again with the ankle lock.

On July 30, on the 200th episode of Impact!, Foley won the TNA Legends Championship by pinning champion Kevin Nash in a tag team match where Nash teamed with Angle and Foley with Bobby Lashley. At Hard Justice on August 16, Nash defeated Foley to regain the title, following interference from Traci Brooks.

==== Various storylines (2009–2011, 2020) ====
On the September 24 episode of Impact! Foley turned heel when he attacked Abyss during and after a TNA World Tag Team Championship match against Booker T and Scott Steiner. Foley revealed Abyss as the one who tore up his picture and attacked him with a videotape and the baseball bat wrapped in barbed wire. Abyss then challenged Foley to a Monster's Ball match which Foley accepted. At Bound for Glory on October 18, Abyss defeated Foley in the match. Two weeks later on the October 29 episode of Impact!, Foley turned on Dr. Stevie and saved Abyss from him, turning face once again. The following week he explained that he had played Dr. Stevie all along and had challenged Abyss to a match at Bound for Glory to see how tough he was. On the edition of November 12 of Impact! Raven returned to TNA and saved Stevie's future in the company by costing Abyss a match and throwing a fireball in Foley's face.

After this, Foley turned his attention away from Abyss and Dr. Stevie and concentrated on Hulk Hogan's arrival in TNA, appearing to be paranoid about Hogan taking over TNA. On the edition of December 3 of Impact! Foley teased another heel turn by booking face Kurt Angle in a handicap match, after Angle refused to give him information on who Hogan is bringing to TNA. At Final Resolution on December 20, Abyss and Foley defeated Stevie and Raven in a "Foley's Funhouse" tag team match. On the live January 4, 2010 episode of Impact!, the day of Hulk Hogan's debut for TNA, Foley was assaulted by the reunited Kevin Nash, Scott Hall and Sean Waltman, when trying to get a meeting with Hogan. On the January 21 episode of Impact! new Executive Producer Eric Bischoff fired Foley, after claiming to have been attacked by him. On the February 11 episode of Impact!, Bischoff and Foley "talked it over", as Hogan had suggested two weeks prior, and Foley was entered in the 8 Card Stud Tournament at Against All Odds on February 14. The match was a No Disqualification match against Abyss, who won the match and advanced. On the March 15 episode of Impact! Bischoff announced that he would be shaving Foley bald as a punishment for trying to help Jeff Jarrett in a handicap match the previous week. At first, Foley was seemingly going along with the plan, but at the last second he shoved Mr. Socko down Bischoff's throat, put him on the barber's chair and shaved him nearly bald. On the following edition of Impact!, Foley lost to Jarrett in a No Disqualification Career vs. Career match set up by Bischoff, forcing Foley to kayfabe leave TNA. In reality, Foley was taken off television due to him being on his way to exceed the maximum number of dates per year on his contract, at the pace he was making appearances.

Foley returned to TNA on the July 15 episode of Impact!, leading an invasion of fellow ECW alumni TNA World Heavyweight Champion Rob Van Dam, Tommy Dreamer, Raven, Stevie Richards, Rhino, Brother Devon, Pat Kenney and Al Snow forming the team of EV 2.0. The following week, TNA president Dixie Carter agreed to give the ECW alumni their own reunion pay–per–view event, Hardcore Justice: The Last Stand on August 8, as a celebration of hardcore wrestling and a final farewell to ECW. At Hardcore Justice, Foley refereed a Final Showdown match between Tommy Dreamer and Raven. On the following edition of Impact!, the ECW alumni, known collectively as Extreme, Version 2.0 (EV 2.0), were assaulted by A.J. Styles, Kazarian, Robert Roode, James Storm, Douglas Williams and Matt Morgan of Ric Flair's Fourtune stable, who thought they didn't deserve to be in TNA. In August, Foley began writing a weekly column for TNA's website. On the October 7, 2010, live edition of Impact!, Foley defeated Ric Flair in a Last Man Standing match. the Last Man Standing match with Flair turned out to be Foley's last match in TNA. At Bound for Glory on October 10, Foley was in EV 2.0's corner, when Dreamer, Raven, Rhino, Richards and Sabu defeated Fourtune members Styles, Kazarian, Morgan, Roode and Storm in a Lethal Lockdown match. After not appearing for two months, Foley returned on the December 23 episode of Impact!, confronting Fortune and Immortal. After Genesis on January 9, 2011, Foley once again disappeared from TNA television, but kept making regular appearances at TNA house shows. At the tapings of the May 12 episode of Impact Wrestling, Foley made his return to television as he was revealed as the "Network" consultant, who had been causing problems for Immortal for the past months. On May 23, Foley, who had expressed frustration with TNA and said that he did not plan to renew his contract with TNA once it would expire in the fall of 2011, made a joke on Twitter, comparing his Empty Arena match with The Rock to a TNA house show. On the following edition of Impact Wrestling on June 2, Hulk Hogan announced that Foley had been fired as the Network Executive. This was done to write Foley, who had asked for his release from TNA, off television. His departure from TNA was confirmed on June 5, 2011.

On October 24, 2020, Foley made a brief return to Impact Wrestling at the 2020 Bound for Glory via video message to congratulate Ken Shamrock for his induction into the Impact Hall of Fame.

=== Second return to WWE (2011–2026) ===
==== Last matches and final retirement (2011−2012) ====
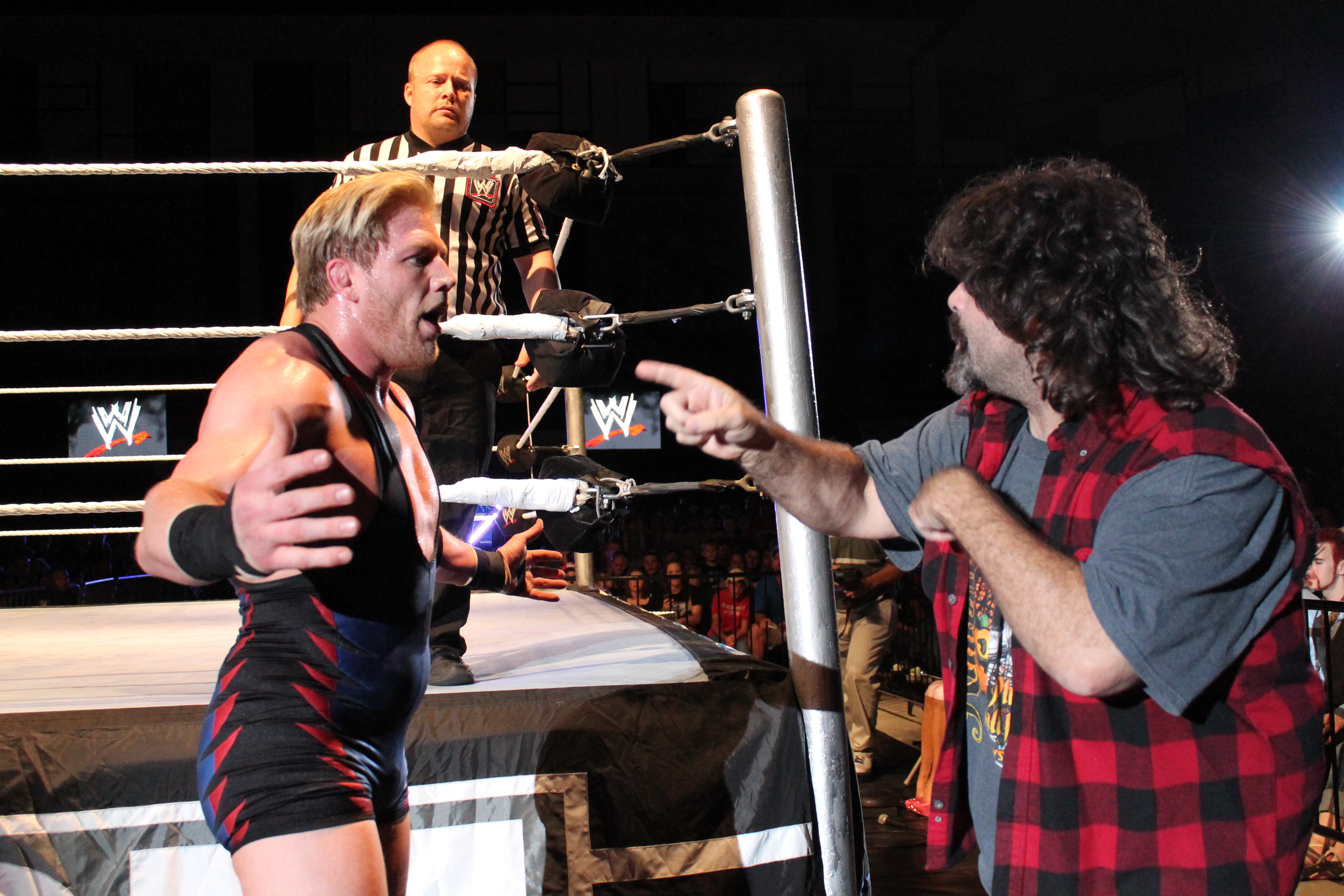
Foley returned to WWE in November 2011 at a house show in Dublin, Ireland

Foley returned to WWE at a house show in Dublin, Ireland, taking a break from his UK comedy tour, on November 2, 2011, making an in-ring promo with The Miz and R-Truth and then guest refereed the tag team match, appearing again in Manchester on November 5. Foley returned to television on the November 14 episode of Raw SuperShow, which featured him presenting a "This Is Your Life" celebration for John Cena (he presented a similar segment for The Rock 12 years earlier). Among those brought out were Cena's former tag team partner Bull Buchanan, his former baseball coach (kayfabe), and his father; however the segment was interrupted by The Rock, who delivered a Rock Bottom to Foley before leaving the ring, ending the segment. Foley was the special guest host on the live edition of SmackDown on November 29.

Foley appeared on the January 16, 2012 episode of Raw SuperShow to announce his intentions to participate in the Royal Rumble match at the 2012 Royal Rumble pay-per-view, later in the night during a six-man tag team match CM Punk needing a tag Foley came down to the ring and got tagged in the match; he defeated David Otunga but John Laurinaitis reversed the decision because Foley was not an official participant of the match. The next week, he also appeared, wishing Zack Ryder good luck in his match against Kane that night. Foley participated in the Royal Rumble match at the 2012 Royal Rumble pay-per-view where he entered at number 7 and eliminated Justin Gabriel (with the help of Ricardo Rodriguez), Epico, and Primo, eventually being eliminated by Cody Rhodes after 6 minutes and 34 seconds. The match was ultimately won by Sheamus. This was Foley's last night as an active wrestler. Foley later appeared in a segment alongside Santino Marella at WrestleMania XXVIII. On April 10, 2012, Foley made an appearance on WWE SmackDown: Blast from the Past. He returned on the June 18 episode of Raw SuperShow announcing that he would be serving as the temporary general manager of both Raw and SmackDown for the week. On July 23, at the 1000th episode of Raw, he appeared as Dude Love, danced with Brodus Clay and performed the mandible claw on Jack Swagger with a tie dyed Mr. Socko. In 2012, he hosted the WWE: Falls Count Anywhere – The Greatest Street Fights and other Out of Control Matches DVD. On the September 24, 2012, episode of Raw, Foley made an appearance to confront CM Punk, telling him to accept a match against John Cena. Later in the show, however, Punk attacked Foley backstage. At Hell in a Cell, CM Punk successfully retained his WWE Championship against Ryback due to interference from the referee, Brad Maddox. The next day on Raw, CM Punk announced he would be facing Team Foley at Survivor Series in a traditional Survivor Series Tag Team Elimination match for which Foley had accepted the challenge. However Punk had been removed from the match the following week. On the November 12, 2012, episode of Raw, Foley was appointed the Special Guest Enforcer in the match between CM Punk and John Cena. Foley's hand-picked Survivor Series team of The Miz, Randy Orton, Kofi Kingston and Team Hell No failed to defeat Team Ziggler in the Traditional 5-on-5 Survivor Series Elimination Tag Match. Foley portrayed Santa Claus on the December 24 pre-taped edition of Monday Night Raw. Foley as Santa was run over by Alberto Del Rio. However, he managed to recover later in the night and help Cena defeat Del Rio in a Miracle on 34th Street Fight match.

In August 2012, Foley was originally scheduled to have a match with the debuting Dean Ambrose at SummerSlam. However, doctors could not medically clear Foley, so Foley announced his final retirement from in-ring competition.

==== Hall of Famer and various appearances (2013−2016) ====
On January 11, 2013, WWE.com announced that Foley would be inducted into the WWE Hall of Fame class of 2013 by his longtime friend Terry Funk. The official announcement was made on the 20th Anniversary of Raw on January 14. At the February 26 taping of Saturday Morning Slam (that aired March 16), Foley was named as the new general manager for the show. Foley returned on April 22 episode of Raw to confront Ryback until he was saved by John Cena. Foley appeared as part of the Extreme Rules post-show to provide an analysis. On the December 18 episode of Main Event he appeared As 'Foley Claus', helping The Miz defeat Curtis Axel. In April 2014, Foley didn't re-sign his Legends contract with WWE.

On the October 20, 2014, episode of Raw, Foley returned during a segment with Dean Ambrose and Seth Rollins where he discussed the cases of their match at Hell in a Cell. Throughout December 2014, Foley appeared in segments on Raw as Saint Mick alongside his daughter Noelle. In 2015, Foley appeared at SummerSlam, where he kicked off the event with host Jon Stewart. Foley returned to Raw on March 14, 2016, in a backstage segment with Dean Ambrose, in which he gave him a pep talk for his upcoming WrestleMania 32 match against Brock Lesnar and a passing of the torch in the form of his iconic barbed wire baseball bat, "Barbie". On April 3, 2016, at WrestleMania 32, Foley returned in-ring alongside Shawn Michaels and Stone Cold Steve Austin in a post-match interruption where the trio of Hall of Famers took on The League of Nations after they had defeated The New Day and proclaimed "No three people can ever defeat us." Foley brought out Mr. Socko and executed the Mandible Claw two times during the fight, once on Sheamus and once on King Barrett. The latter was part of a three-way finishing move sequence where Barrett was first hit with Sweet Chin Music by Shawn Michaels, staggered and fell into Mr. Socko, and finally hit with a Stone Cold Stunner.

==== Raw General Manager (2016–2017) ====
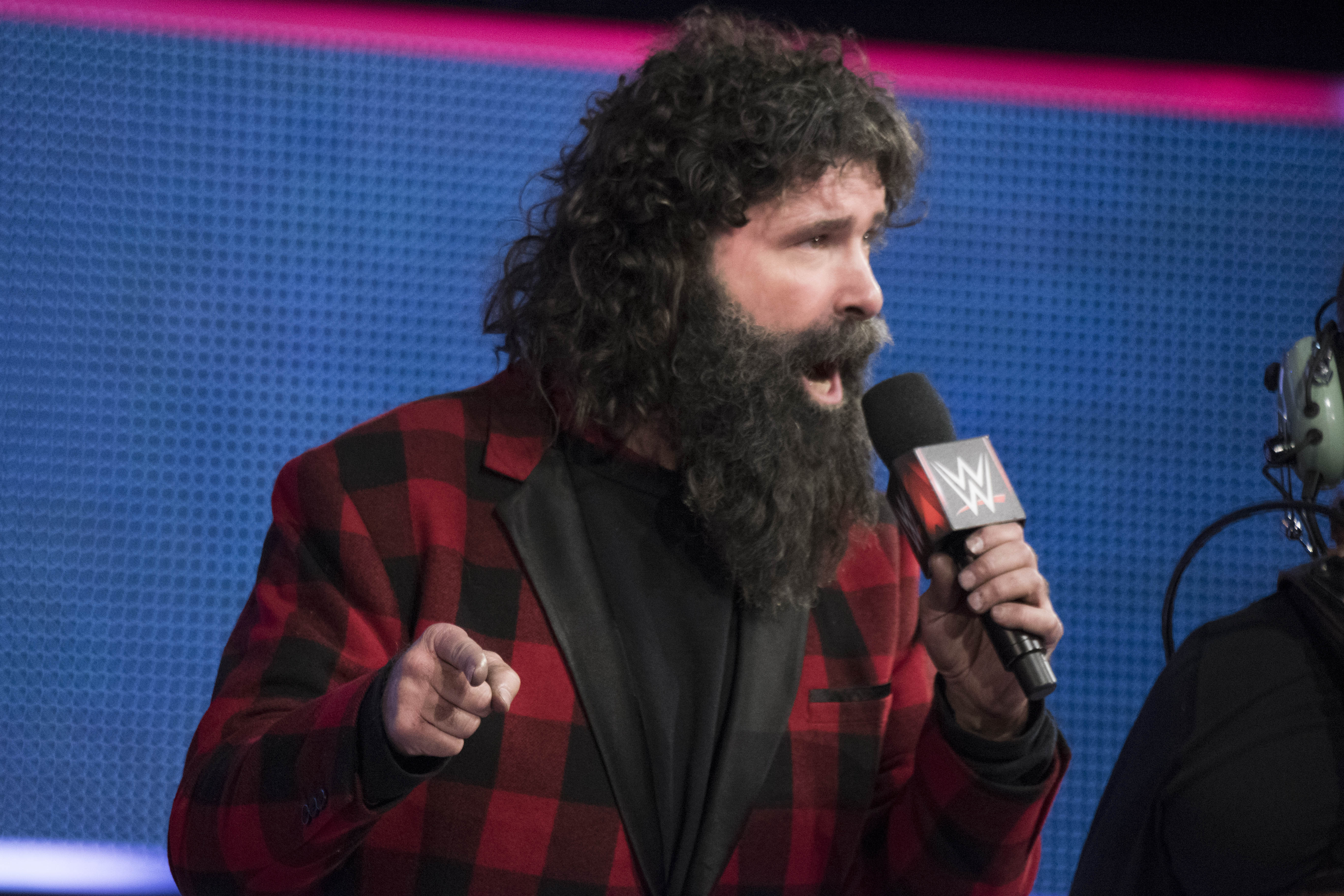
Foley at WWE Tribute to the Troops in December 2016

On the July 18, 2016, episode of Raw, Foley was appointed by Stephanie McMahon as the general manager of Raw. Foley unveiled new titles exclusive to the Raw brand, while also making fair decisions to favor the faces and occasionally disagreeing with Stephanie McMahon. One of Foley's first decisions as Raw General Manager was pitting the feuding Sheamus and Cesaro against one another in a Best of 7 series. Going into Clash of Champions the duo were tied 3–3. At Clash of Champions, both men would be counted out resulting in a draw and the best of seven series being declared a draw. On the next night's episode of Raw Foley who had promised the victor a championship opportunity would put the two in a tag team. This would lead to the creation of The Bar. On the November 21 episode of Raw, Foley would place Sami Zayn in a match against Braun Strowman after Zayn failed to defeat The Miz at Survivor Series for the WWE Intercontinental Championship to bring the title to Raw. During the match, Foley would order the match to be stopped, deeming Zayn unable to continue. The following week on Raw, Zayn would demand a rematch against Strowman, but Foley would decline, telling Zayn he could not beat him, making Zayn storm off in anger. On the December 12 episode of Raw, Zayn would once again ask for a rematch with Strowman but was once again rejected by Foley. Zayn would then tell Foley he was pondering going to SmackDown because Foley did not believe in him. Later that night, after Zayn defeated Jinder Mahal, Foley would tell him he has arranged a trade with SmackDown for him in exchange for Eva Marie. Zayn would angrily refuse the trade and once again demanded a rematch with Strowman. Foley would yield, giving Zayn his match with Strowman at Roadblock: End of the Line with a ten-minute time limit.

On the March 13, 2017, episode of Raw, Stephanie McMahon forced Foley to fire a member of the Raw roster by the end of the night. Foley chose to fire Stephanie McMahon herself, which prompted Triple H to come out and confront Foley. After being insulted and ordered to leave the ring, Foley instead attacked Triple H, stuffing a stinky sock in Triple H's mouth via Mr. Socko before being low blowed by McMahon. Seth Rollins would then come out to aid Foley, only to be attacked by Triple H. On the March 20 episode of Raw, Stephanie McMahon would fire Foley for his actions the previous week. A few weeks later Foley made an appearance at the WWE Hall of Fame class of 2017 ceremony.

==== Sporadic appearances (2018–2026) ====
On the September 10, 2018, episode of Raw, Foley interrupted Elias with the announcement that in speaking with Stephanie McMahon regarding the upcoming 20th anniversary of his Hell in a Cell match with The Undertaker at King of the Ring that he would be appointed special guest referee for the WWE Universal Championship match between Roman Reigns and Braun Strowman at the September Hell in a Cell PPV event. At Hell in a Cell, Brock Lesnar would interfere in the contest with Paul Heyman spraying Foley in the eyes with pepper spray, as a result; the match was ruled a no-contest. Following the show, a Mick Foley 20 Years of Hell special was aired on the WWE Network. On the May 20, 2019, edition of Raw, Foley returned to unveil a new championship. He unveiled the 24/7 Championship announcing a scramble for the title. In July, he announced that he wanted to challenge R-Truth for the championship. However, that didn't occur due to being attacked by "The Fiend" Bray Wyatt on Raw.

On the November 7, 2023, episode of NXT, Foley announced who would be in the qualifiers for the Iron Survivor Challenge at NXT Deadline.

In December 2025, Foley announced that, in light of his concerns about WWE's relationship with President of the United States Donald Trump, particularly in the context of Trump's "cruel" comments on the death of Rob Reiner, he would not make any further appearances for WWE during Trump's time in office, and he would not renew his WWE Legends deal upon its expiration in June 2026.

=== All Elite Wrestling (2026–present) ===
Foley made his first appearance for All Elite Wrestling (AEW) as the co-host for the buy-in show for Double or Nothing on May 20, 2026. During the show, AEW owner and head booker Tony Khan announced that Foley had officially signed with the promotion.

== Professional wrestling style and persona ==
Throughout his career, Foley primarily portrayed one of three characters:

- Cactus Jack, a ruthless brawler from Truth or Consequences, New Mexico who wore cowboy boots.
- Mankind, a deranged, masochistic former piano prodigy wearing a strange leather mask. Mankind originally wore brown clothing decorated with a mysterious symbol; in 1998, he began wearing a dress shirt and tie. In his early appearances, he wore a guard over the fingers of his right hand, which his character was described as having smashed with a hammer to escape having to play the piano. Originally a sinister character, over time Mankind evolved to be a more comical and loveable figure.
- Dude Love, a dancing, jive talking hippie who wore tie-dyed clothing decorated with hearts. Originally a comical babyface, in 1998 Foley introduced a villainous, "corporate sell-out" version of the character. Foley originated the Dude Love character for his 1985 short film The Loved One, in which he portrayed a wrestler who used that name.

In the early 2000s, Foley started wrestling under his real name without any of the gimmicks, and typically wore a flannel shirt in the ring and utilized moves from all three personae.

By his own admission possessing limited innate technical wrestling skills, Foley's wrestling style emphasized bumps, brawling, and psychology.

As Cactus Jack, Foley's original finishing move was a diving elbow drop delivered from the ring apron to a supine opponent on the floor. He later adopted the double arm DDT, which he borrowed from Kenta Kobashi. He also utilized the Cactus Clothesline, a running clothesline that would propel both Foley and his opponent over the top rope to the floor below. After adopting his Mankind persona, Foley began using the Mandible Claw, a nerve pinch originally used by the wrestler and former physician Sam Sheppard suggested to him by Jim Cornette. In 1998, Foley began donning a sock puppet, dubbed Mr. Socko, before executing the Mandible Claw. As "Dude Love", Foley adopted Sweet Shin Music (named in parody of Shawn Michaels's Sweet Chin Music superkick), a kick to his opponent's shin that would leave them vulnerable to a double arm DDT.

== Writing career ==
Foley is a multi-time New York Times bestselling author, particularly known for his ongoing series of memoirs. His writing has generally received favorable reviews.

From May 7 to July 1, 1999, Foley wrote his autobiography – without the aid of a ghostwriter, as he noted in the introduction – in almost 800 pages of longhand. The book, Have a Nice Day: A Tale of Blood and Sweatsocks was released on October 31, 1999, and topped The New York Times' non-fiction bestseller list for several weeks. The follow-up, Foley Is Good: And the Real World Is Faker than Wrestling, was released on May 8, 2001.

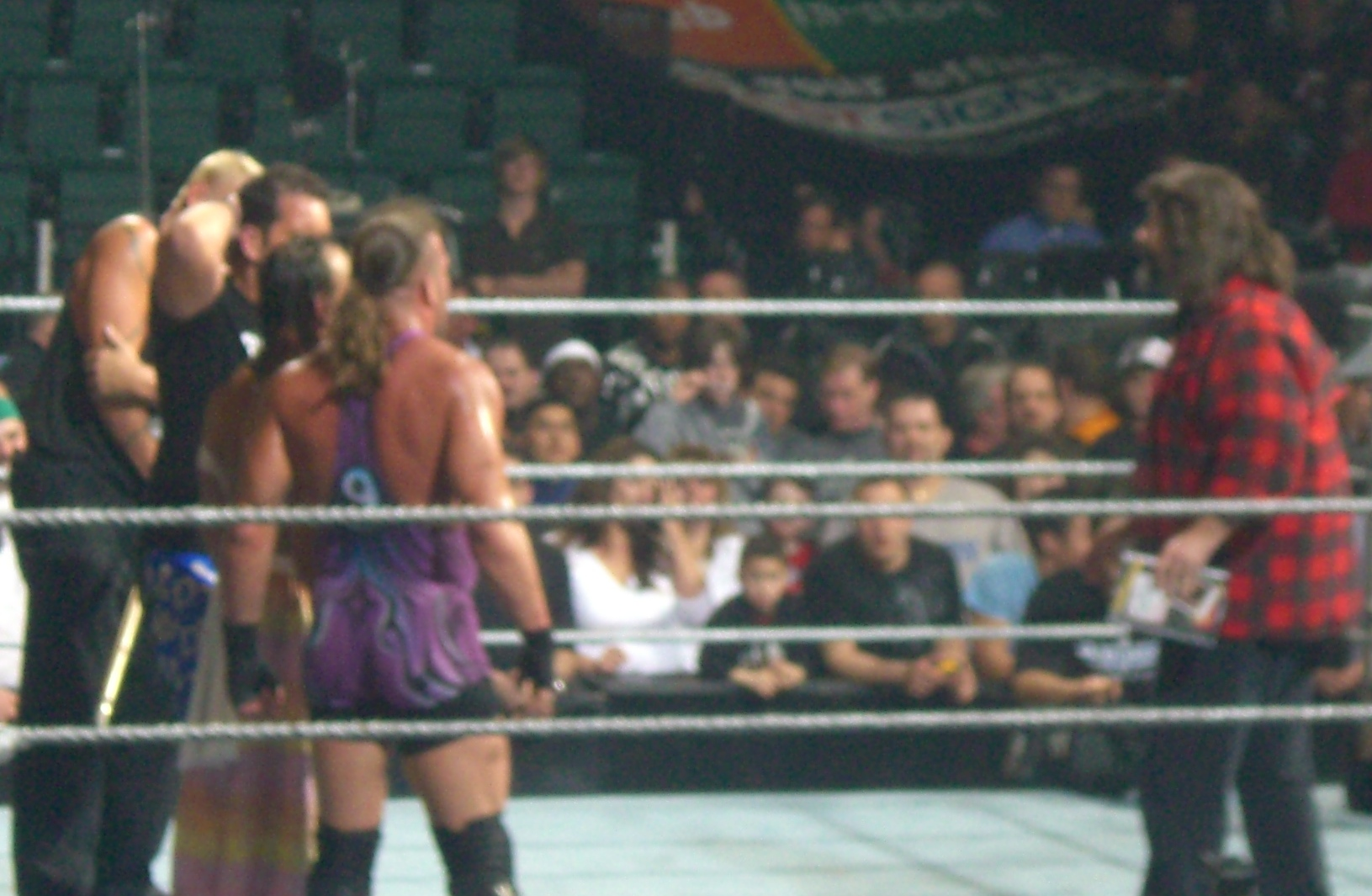
Foley promoting his book on WWE ECW brand

The third part of his autobiography, The Hardcore Diaries, highlights his 2004 feud with Randy Orton, his match and later partnership with Edge, and program with Ric Flair in 2006. The Hardcore Diaries was released on March 6, 2007, also spent time on the New York Times bestseller list. Foley's Countdown to Lockdown was released on October 1, 2010. On September 30, 2010, Joey Styles interviewed Foley on WWE.com – even though Foley was under contract with TNA – about his new book, while Michael Cole plugged the book on the edition of September 27 of Raw and a piece was published by Foley in Slate of which portions were adapted from Countdown. WWE's promotion of a product released by an employee of a rival company was a quite unusual move and a welcome surprise for Foley, who has since stated that he was delighted at the respect shown by his former employer. On November 10, 2010, Foley appeared on The Daily Show and Off the Record to discuss the book and his charity work. Countdown to Lockdown became Foley's first memoir to not make the New York Times bestseller list.

His fifth autobiography, Saint Mick, was released on October 17, 2017.

Foley has also written four children's books, Mick Foley's Halloween Hijinx, Mick Foley's Christmas Chaos, Tales from Wrescal Lane and A Most Mizerable Christmas, in addition to two novels: Tietam Brown, a coming-of-age story which was nominated for the WHSmith People's Choice Award in 2004 and Scooter, was published in August 2005.

=== List of works ===
Memoirs

- (1999) Have a Nice Day: A Tale of Blood and Sweatsocks. ReganBooks. ISBN 0-06-039299-1. (credited as Mankind/Mick Foley)
- (2001) Foley Is Good: And the Real World Is Faker than Wrestling. ReganBooks. ISBN 0-06-103241-7.
- (2007) The Hardcore Diaries. PocketBooks. ISBN 1-4165-3157-2
- (2010) Countdown to Lockdown: A Hardcore Journal. Grand Central Publishing. ISBN 0-446-56461-3
- (2017) Saint Mick: My Journey From Hardcore Legend to Santa's Jolly Elf . Polis Books. ISBN 1943818754

Children's fiction

- (2000) Mick Foley's Christmas Chaos. ReganBooks. ISBN 0-06-039414-5.
- (2001) Mick Foley's Halloween Hijinx. HarperCollins Publishers. ISBN 0-06-000251-4.
- (2004) Tales From Wrescal Lane. World Wrestling Entertainment. ISBN 0-7434-6634-9.
- (2012) A Most Mizerable Christmas DK Publishing, Inc. ISBN 9781465403452.

Contemporary fiction

- (2003) Tietam Brown. Knopf. ISBN 0-375-41550-5.
- (2005) Scooter. Knopf. ISBN 1-4000-4414-6.

== Personal life ==
Foley's father, former Ward Melville High School Athletic Director Jack Foley, died on September 13, 2009, at the age of 76.

Foley married his wife, Colette (née Christie), in 1992. They have four children: Dewey, Noelle, Michael Jr. (Mickey), and Hughie. As of June 2018, Dewey works for WWE. Mickey and Hughie operate their own YouTube channel, MickeyFoley0105. Foley himself occasionally appears in Mickey's videos, including one parodying the 2010 LeBron James special The Decision in which Foley teases announcing Al Snow as being his WWE Hall of Fame inductee before announcing the real inductee, Terry Funk. Michael is on the autism spectrum and Mick is a strong advocate for autism acceptance, believing they are the most passionate wrestling fans.

Foley is a longtime fan of women's professional wrestling and has campaigned for their equality with men.

Foley is a fan of the Stony Brook Seawolves college basketball team and frequently attended home games. Foley's father taught at Stony Brook University's school of professional development.

== Film, television and radio ==
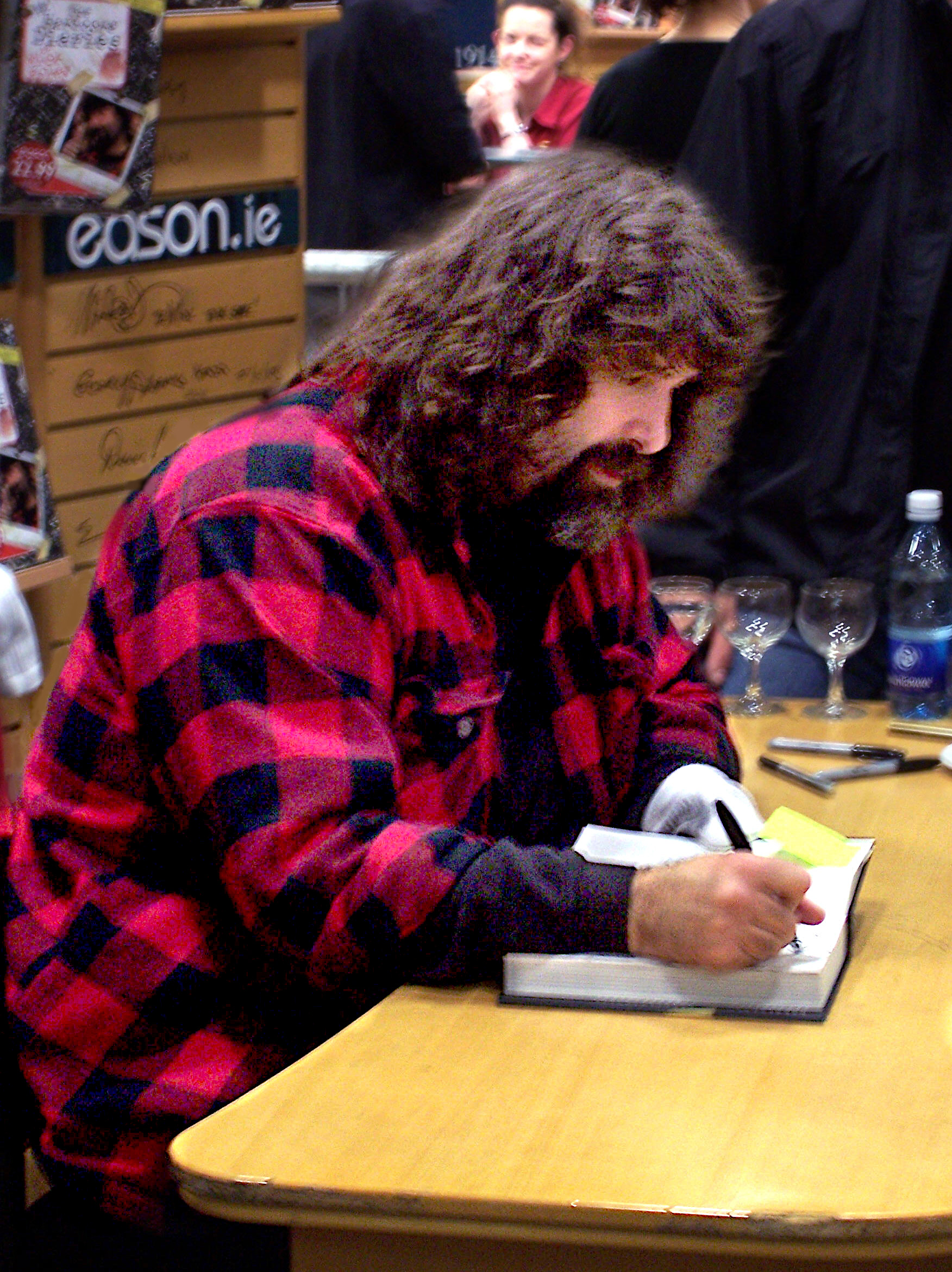
Foley signing autographs

One of Foley's earliest acting roles was in 1996. Shortly before he joined the WWF, Foley appeared in Atlanta filmmakers Barry Norman and Michael Williams' short subject Deadbeats as "Bird", an armed robber turned debt collector. One of Foley's first TV guest appearances was as a wrestler on USA Network's short-lived action-comedy G vs E. He also featured prominently in the documentary Beyond the Mat. As Mankind, he also starred in a series of commercials for Chef Boyardee's beef ravioli. He appeared in the Insane Clown Posse vehicle Big Money Hustlas as Cactus Sac, which was the same character as his Cactus Jack persona.

In late 2001, Foley hosted a series of Robot Wars dubbed "Extreme Warriors." He also provided a guest voice for two episodes of the Nickelodeon animated series Avatar: The Last Airbender, in which he portrayed a satirical earthbending wrestler named The Boulder, and provided the voice for Gorrath in the pilot episode of Megas XLR. Foley appeared in an episode of Boy Meets World as Mankind, advising to Eric Matthews before giving Eric the mandible claw and an airplane spin. Foley was also a voice in an episode of Celebrity Deathmatch where he was an animated version of Mankind doing a stunt from the ceiling, and later in the same episode he fought and defeated Ernest Hemingway. Foley also had a small role in the 2007 thriller movie Anamorph starring Willem Dafoe.

Foley has frequently appeared on Air America Radio's Morning Sedition, including several stints as a guest host and has appeared on The Rachel Maddow Show. He also hosted WWE's radio show. Foley also occasionally appeared on the Opie and Anthony. He appeared in the 2009 wrestling documentary, Bloodstained Memoirs.

In 2009, Foley had a guest voice appearance on Adult Swim show Squidbillies as Thunder Clap, a former pro-wrestler (strongly resembling Hulk Hogan in appearance and speech), who had recently gone through some tough times, during the Season 4 episode "Anabolic-holic". On August 22, 2009, Foley made his stand-up debut at The Improv in Los Angeles. The event was billed the "Total Xtreme Comedy show" and also featured comedians Brad Williams, Bret Ernst and Ring of Honor's Colt Cabana, who was also making his stand-up debut. The money Foley made from the event went to Wrestler's Rescue, which creates awareness and helps raise money to support retired professional wrestlers' health care needs. In October 2009, Foley was guest DJ on E Street Radio, a Satellite radio station dedicated to the music of Bruce Springsteen.

On November 19, 2009, Foley made his first appearance on The Daily Show. Deemed the "Senior Ass Kicker", Foley defended the pro-gay rights views of Will Phillips. He showed up again on March 15, 2010, to help correspondent Wyatt Cenac compare politics to pro wrestling, giving speeches for and against the use of the filibuster. Due to his charitable work and for standing up for Will Phillips, Foley was awarded a "Medal of Reasonableness" by Jon Stewart at the 2010 Rally to Restore Sanity and/or Fear. On June 18, 2013, Foley again appeared on the Daily Show, now hosted by temporary host John Oliver. On this appearance, he defended immigration reform in response to the WWE's character Zeb Colter's comments on the June 17 episode of Raw.

In mid-2010, Foley appeared at Chicago Comic Con, where he had his own booth promoting TNA. He was also interviewed by Victory Records, mentioning his interest in Swedish hard rock band Sister Sin.

On September 27, 2010, it was announced that Union Square Agency and American Original would be producing a feature film based on Foley's life.

In November 2010, Foley was a contestant on an all TNA week of Family Feud, teaming with Jay Lethal, Matt Morgan, Mr. Anderson and Rob Van Dam against Angelina Love, Christy Hemme, Lacey Von Erich, Tara and Velvet Sky.

Foley and his family appeared on ABC's Celebrity Wife Swap on January 31, 2012. His wife Colette traded places on the show with Antonio Sabàto, Jr.'s fiancé, Cheryl Moana Marie Nunes.

Foley appeared in a CollegeHumor video entitled "Mick Foley Mystery" as himself.

In 2014, a documentary starring Foley was released by Virgil Films entitled, I Am Santa Claus. The film was produced by Foley and Morgan Spurlock. It chronicles the lives of members of the Fraternal Order of Real Bearded Santas.

In 2018, Foley's infatuation for all things Christmas was documented in musical form with the song Mandible Claus by the B+ Players.

Foley had a small role as a wrestling referee in the 2019 film The Peanut Butter Falcon.

Since 2022, Foley hosts a podcast with Conrad Thompson titled Foley is Pod.

=== Filmography ===
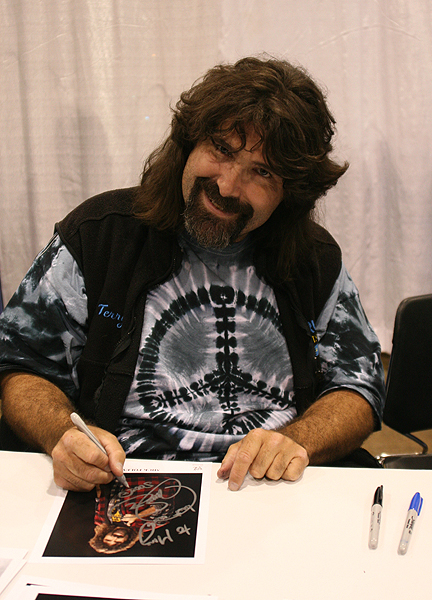
Foley at a signing in 2008

Film work by Mick Foley
Year	Title	Role
1999	Beyond the Mat	Himself
2000	Big Money Hustlas	Cactus Sac
2007	Anamorph	Antique Store Owner
2009	Bloodstained Memoirs	Himself
2015	Dixieland	Himself
2016	Chokeslam	Patrick
2019	The Peanut Butter Falcon	Jacob
2020	12 Hour Shift	Nicholas
2020	You Cannot Kill David Arquette	Himself

Television work by Mick Foley
Year	Title	Role	Notes
1999	Total Request Live	Mankind	1 episode
1999	Boy Meets World	Mankind	1 episode
1999	G vs E	Himself	1 episode
1999	The Howard Stern Show	Himself	1 episode
1999	The Martin Short Show	Himself	1 episode
1999	Late Night with Conan O'Brien	Himself	1 episode
1999–2001	The Howard Stern Radio Show	Himself	3 episodes
2000	Celebrity Deathmatch	Mankind	1 episode
2000	Now and Again	Charlie	1 episode
2000	Saturday Night Live	Himself	1 episode
2001	Who Wants to Be a Millionaire	Himself	Contestant
2001	The Tonight Show with Jay Leno	Himself	1 episode
2001–2002	Robot Wars: Extreme Warriors	Himself	Host
2003	Jimmy Kimmel Live!	Himself	Guest co-host, 5 episodes
2006–2007	Avatar: The Last Airbender	The Boulder	Voice, 2 episodes
2008	Kitchen Nightmares	Himself	1 episode
2009	Squidbillies	Thunderclap	1 episode
2009–2013	The Daily Show	Himself	3 episodes
2010	Family Feud	Himself	5 episodes
2010	Warren the Ape	Himself	1 episode
2012	30 Rock	Mankind	1 episode
2012	Celebrity Wife Swap	Himself	1 episode
2016–2017	Holy Foley!	Himself	Main cast, reality series
2019	Dark Side of the Ring	Himself / narrator	1 episode
2019	Say Yes to the Dress	Himself	1 episode
2020	The Big Show Show	Himself	1 episode
2021	Pawn Stars	Himself	1 episode
2021	Heels	Dick Valentine	1 episode

Video game work by Mick Foley
Year	Title	Role	Notes
2007	Avatar: The Last Airbender – The Burning Earth	The Boulder	Voice

== Activism ==
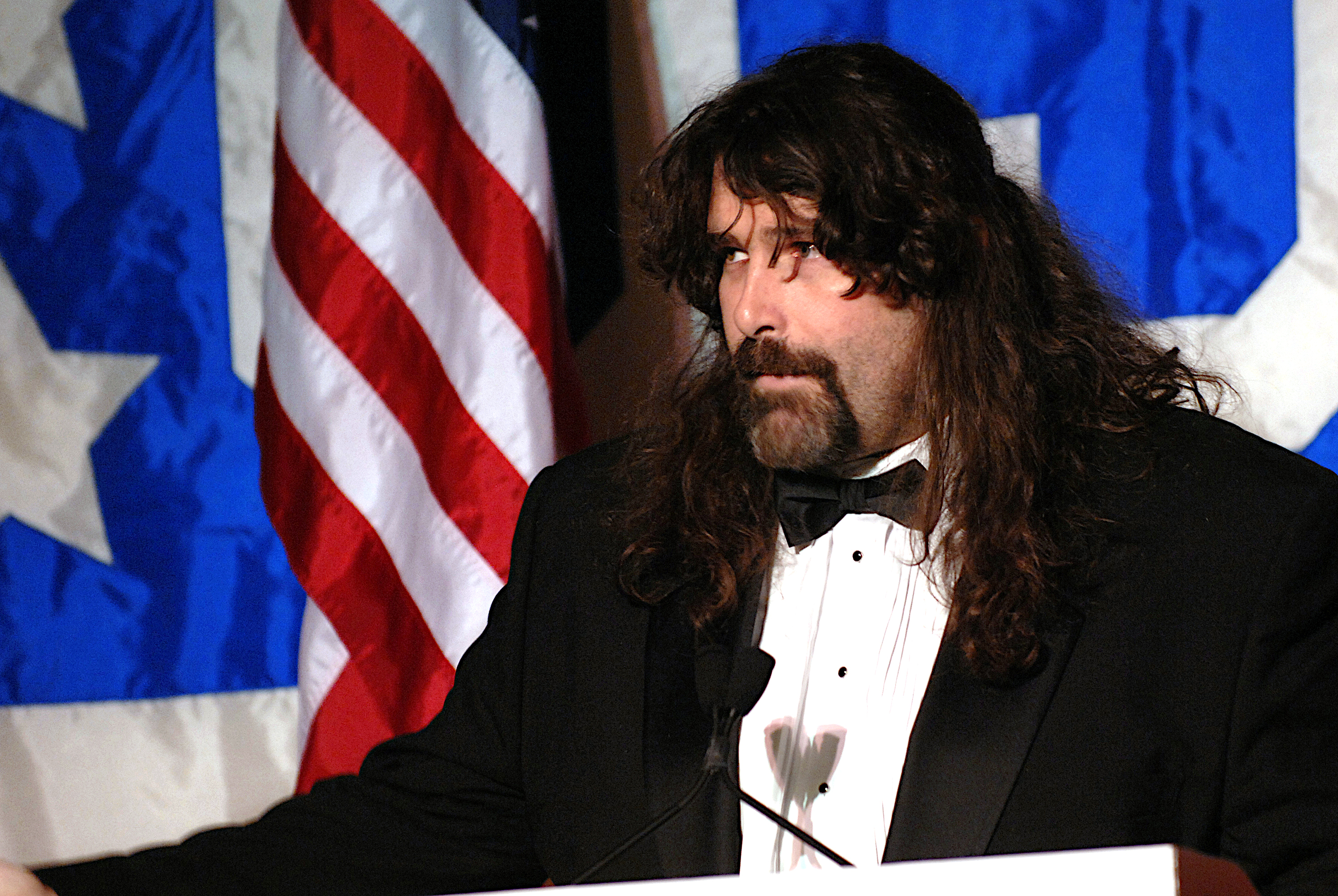
Foley speaking at the USO Metro awards in March 2008

Much of Foley's charitable work revolves around children. Among his involvement, Foley has volunteered with "Camp Adventure" helping kids coping with cancer, has participated in numerous Make-a-Wish Foundation events, has made surprise visits to children in hospitals, and has visited schools and libraries to talk to students about the value of education and the importance of reading. Foley sponsors seven children with ChildFund International (formerly Christian Children's Fund), a group he has been affiliated with since 1992. In recent years, he has become one of the fund's leading donors, helping fund childhood education centers in the remote areas of the Philippines and Mexico, as well as four small community schools in the West African nation of Sierra Leone. After visiting the country in November 2008, an experience he called "one of the best experiences of my life; maybe the best," Foley committed to funding a larger primary school, which was completed in September 2009.

Foley has visited U.S. troops at various military bases and military hospitals. For several years Foley visited wounded soldiers at Washington, D.C.–based military hospitals on almost a monthly basis, becoming known as a "Legend among hurt troops," according to a Washington Times article.

Having become a devoted fan of Tori Amos's music in 1993, (particularly the song "Winter" from the Little Earthquakes album), and following a meeting with Amos at the 2008 San Diego Comic-Con, Foley became involved with the Rape, Abuse & Incest National Network (RAINN), a group Amos co-founded in 1994. Since then, he has worked as a volunteer on their online hotline and as a member of their National Leadership Council. During a 15-month period ending in April 2011, Foley logged more than 550 hours talking to victims online. The same month, Foley offered to mow anyone's lawn who donated at least $5,000 to the organization, stating, "If you want to help survivors of sexual assault, or just want to see a big guy with long hair mowing your lawn in front of your friends, please take part..."

Continuing his campaign for the organization, in May 2011, Foley auctioned off on eBay two famous items associated with his wrestling career: his Cactus Jack lace-up "leopard skin" boots (still embedded with 149 thumbtacks from his Impact match with Ric Flair); and the white shirt that he wore as Mankind during 1998's "Hell in a Cell" match, among other items.

Foley has been outspoken in his support for the Democratic Party. During the 2004 election cycle, Foley argued the Democratic point of view in a WWE-sponsored debate against John "Bradshaw" Layfield, who spoke for the Republican side. He was a contributor to Barack Obama's campaign for the U.S. presidency in 2008. In a video uploaded to his official YouTube channel on October 23, 2024, Foley endorsed Kamala Harris for the 2024 presidential election after denouncing Donald Trump's threats to deploy the military to purge "the enemy from within".

== Championships and accomplishments ==
- Cauliflower Alley Club
  - Art Abrams Lifetime Achievement Award (2011)
  - Iron Mike Mazurki Award (2025)
  - The Mick Foley Philanthropy Award
- Continental Wrestling Association
  - CWA Tag Team Championship (1 time) – with Gary Young
- Eastern Championship Wrestling / Extreme Championship Wrestling
  - ECW Tag Team Championship / ECW World Tag Team Championship (2 times) – with Mikey Whipwreck
- George Tragos/Lou Thesz Professional Wrestling Hall of Fame
  - Frank Gotch Award (2010)
- International Wrestling Association of Japan
  - IWA World Tag Team Championship (1 time) – with Tracy Smothers
  - King of the Deathmatch (1995)
- Memphis Wrestling Hall of Fame
  - Class of 2018
- Mid-South Championship Wrestling
  - MSCW North American Championship (3 times)
- North American Wrestling
  - NAW Heavyweight Championship (1 time)
- National Wrestling League
  - NWL Heavyweight Championship (1 time)
- Ozark Mountain Wrestling
  - OMW North American Heavyweight Championship (1 time)
- Pro Wrestling Illustrated
  - Inspirational Wrestler of the Year (1993)
  - Match of the Year (1998) vs. The Undertaker in a Hell in a Cell match at King of the Ring
  - Match of the Year (1999) vs. The Rock in an "I Quit" match at Royal Rumble
  - Ranked No. 19 of the top 500 singles wrestlers in the PWI 500 in 1999
  - Ranked No. 46 of the 500 best singles wrestlers of the PWI Years in 2003
- Professional Wrestling Hall of Fame
  - Class of 2017
- Setup Thailand Pro Wrestling
  - Setup 24/7 Championship (1 time)
- Steel City Wrestling
  - SCW Heavyweight Championship (1 time)
  - SCW Tag Team Championship (1 time) – with The Blue Meanie
- Sports Illustrated
  - Ranked No. 19 of the 20 Greatest WWE Wrestlers Of All Time
- Suffolk Sports Hall of Fame
  - Class of 1999 (Wrestling category)
- Total Nonstop Action Wrestling
  - TNA World Heavyweight Championship (1 time)
  - TNA Legends Championship (1 time)
- World Championship Wrestling
  - WCW World Tag Team Championship (1 time) – with Kevin Sullivan
- World Class Championship Wrestling / United States Wrestling Association
  - USWA World Tag Team Championship (1 time) – with Scott Braddock
  - WCWA World Light Heavyweight Championship (1 time)
  - WCWA World Tag Team Championship (2 times) – with Super Zodiak II (1) and Scott Braddock (1)
- World Wrestling Federation / WWE
  - WWF Championship (3 times)
  - WWF Hardcore Championship (1 time, inaugural)
  - WWF Tag Team Championship (8 times) – with Stone Cold Steve Austin (1), Chainsaw Charlie (1), Kane (2), The Rock (3) and Al Snow (1)
  - Tag Team Royal Rumble (1998) – with Kane
  - WWE Hall of Fame (Class of 2013)
  - Slammy Award (1 time)
    - Loose Screw (1997)
- Wrestling Observer Newsletter
  - Best Brawler (1991–2000)
  - Best on Interviews (1995, 2004, 2006)
  - Best Pro Wrestling Book (2010) for Countdown to Lockdown
  - Feud of the Year (2000) vs. Triple H
  - Most Disgusting Promotional Tactic (1993) – Cactus Jack amnesia angle
  - Readers' Favorite Wrestler (1998)
  - Wrestling Observer Newsletter Hall of Fame (Class of 2000)
- Other championships
  - Tri-Cities Tag Team Championships (1 time) – with Shane Douglas
