= To Be the Man =

2004 autobiographical book by Ric Flair

- Author: Ric Flair; Keith Elliot Greenberg
- Language: English
- Genre: Autobiography
- Publisher: WWE Books; Pocket Books
- Publication date: July 6, 2004
- Publication place: United States
- Media type: Hardcover and paperback
- Pages: 352
- ISBN: 0-7434-5691-2
- OCLC: 55518495
- Dewey Decimal: 796.812/092 B 22
- LC Class: GV1196.F59 A3 2004

To Be the Man is an autobiographical book written by professional wrestler Ric Flair and Keith Elliot Greenberg, and edited by Mark Madden. It was published by both WWE Books and Pocket Books and distributed by Simon & Schuster on July 6, 2004. The book's title was taken from Flair's famous catchphrase: "To be the man, you gotta beat the man!".

== Content ==
The book discusses Flair's birth and adoption through the Tennessee Children's Home Society (whose adoption practices would later be discovered to involve child selling; the opening chapter is titled "Black Market Baby") and beginnings that lead him to stardom in promotions such as American Wrestling Association, National Wrestling Alliance, World Championship Wrestling, and World Wrestling Federation/Entertainment.

== Reception ==
Dave Meltzer of The Wrestling Observer stated that it was the best written wrestler autobiography at the time, but that he felt that Flair's comments accusing Bret Hart of using his brother Owen's death to further his own agenda deeply disturbing and out of line as well as "unnecessary and offensive".

To Be the Man reached No. 5 on the hardback, non-fiction New York Times Best Seller list. It reached No. 10 for nonfiction best-sellers in Publishers Weekly. Upon its release, Flair held a successful book signing at a Borders in his hometown of Charlotte, North Carolina. Nearly 13,000 copies sold between July 4 and 11, according to Nielsen BookScan.
