= Blade Runners (professional wrestling) =

Professional wrestling tag team

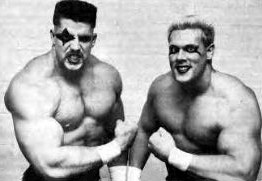
- Blade Runner Rock (left) and Blade Runner Sting (right)

Tag team
- Name(s): Powerteam USA; The Freedom Fighters; The Blade Runners
- Members: Blade Runner Rock/Freedom Fighter Justice; Blade Runner Sting/Freedom Fighter Flash
- Billed heights: Rock: 6 ft 2 in (1.88 m); Sting: 6 ft 3 in (1.91 m)
- Combined billed weight: 530 lb (240 kg; 38 st)
- Debut: 1985
- Disbanded: 1986
- Years active: 1985–1986, 1998
- Trained by: Rick Bassman; Red Bastien

The Blade Runners were a professional wrestling tag team consisting of future superstars Steve Borden and Jim Hellwig that existed in 1985 and 1986. Their look was from the new wave music scene with black eye paint and spiked hair with a rattail (Borden's bleached blonde and Hellwig's dyed black). The two men would go on to individual success under the ring names of Sting and Ultimate Warrior, respectively.

== History ==
Steve Borden and Jim Hellwig originally teamed as part of Powerteam USA, a group of four wrestlers who debuted in 1985 after being trained by Red Bastien and Rick Bassman. In addition to Borden and Hellwig, the group consisted of Garland Donoho and Mark Miller. The team was managed by Bassman as they tried to break into the wrestling business. After only a short time in the business both Donoho and Miller quit due to lack of success and business savvy.

Initially, Hellwig and Borden wrestled as The Freedom Fighters (Justice and Flash, respectively) in Jerry Jarrett's Continental Wrestling Association initially as fan favorites then later as villains, first led by "coach" Buddy Wayne, then later under manager Dutch Mantel. Because they were essentially bodybuilders and lacked thorough training, the team was raw and brutal, easily hurting opponents with their stiff maneuvers which led to their stay in Memphis being a short one.

On December 28 1985, the duo gave a TV interview with Lance Russell in which they wore black makeup and announced that they would henceforth be known as The Blade Runners (Hellwig was called Rock and Borden became Sting). Shortly afterwards the team began working for Bill Watts' Mid-South Wrestling (renamed the Universal Wrestling Federation soon after) in early 1986. The Blade Runners were managed by "Hot Stuff" Eddie Gilbert and as part of "Hot Stuff International, Inc." the team feuded with Ted DiBiase and Steve Williams.

Less than six months after arriving in Mid-South, Hellwig and Borden split up with Hellwig moving on to World Class Championship Wrestling, where he became known as Dingo Warrior, later turning face and laying the foundation for his famous Ultimate Warrior gimmick in the World Wrestling Federation. Borden remained in the UWF and under the tutelage of Eddie Gilbert for a while before also turning face. As Sting, Borden was among the wrestlers whose contracts were acquired by Jim Crockett Promotions when it bought the UWF in 1987.

In 1990, the Warrior and Sting respectively won the WWF Championship from Hulk Hogan and the NWA World Heavyweight Championship from Ric Flair. For several months, the two former tag team partners sat atop the wrestling business as World champions of each of the two major league promotions before losing their titles eight days apart in January 1991. Warrior would never regain his title although Sting would enjoy multiple further World championships in World Championship Wrestling, World Wrestling All-Stars, and Total Nonstop Action Wrestling.

== Reunion ==
The two men reunited for one match on WCW Monday Nitro on October 12, 1998, against Hollywood Hogan and Bret Hart of nWo Hollywood. However, the Blade Runners name was not used for this appearance. Sting and Warrior won the match via disqualification due to interference from the nWo.
