= The Self-Destruction of the Ultimate Warrior =

- DVD cover
- Directed by: Kevin Dunn
- Produced by: Lori Calabrese; Steve Cooney; Vince McMahon
- Starring: Ultimate Warrior
- Edited by: Cory Poccia
- Music by: Jim Johnston
- Production company: World Wrestling Entertainment
- Distributed by: WWE Home Video
- Release date: September 27, 2005
- Running time: 90 minutes
- Country: United States
- Language: English

The Self-Destruction of the Ultimate Warrior is a 2005 American documentary film released by World Wrestling Entertainment (WWE) that chronicled the career of the Ultimate Warrior, a professional wrestler who rose to fame during the 1980s professional wrestling boom. At the time, Warrior was retired from wrestling and was not involved in the documentary's production. The documentary received mixed reviews on its release, with significant criticism coming from the overall negative portrayal of Warrior. The Self-Destruction of the Ultimate Warrior was released by WWE Home Video on September 27, 2005.

== Overview ==
The documentary focuses on the professional wrestling career of Jim Hellwig, known professionally for much of his career as Ultimate Warrior. Throughout the documentary, which is composed mostly of archive footage of Warrior, numerous other professional wrestlers and WWE employees are interviewed. Many of these individuals share negative opinions of Warrior and criticize many aspects of the person, including his in-ring capabilities as a wrestler, his nonsensical promos, and his general unprofessional behavior.

Beginning in the mid-1980s, Warrior worked for the Continental Wrestling Association and Universal Wrestling Federation with tag team partner Steve Borden (better known as Sting). Warrior eventually pursues a singles career in World Class Championship Wrestling before joining the World Wrestling Federation (WWF, now WWE) in the late 1980s. In the WWF, Warrior became one of the most popular wrestlers in the promotion, headlined multiple pay-per-views, and won both the Intercontinental Championship and the WWF Championship. However, after failing a drug test, Warrior was fired from the company in 1992. In 1996, Warrior is rehired, but is fired several months later after missing several shows. Throughout the 1990s, Warrior engages in several lawsuits with the WWF, including over the 1996 firing and over the intellectual copyright to his character. In 1998, Warrior signed with competing promotion World Championship Wrestling, though his time with the company is short-lived after a poorly rated pay-per-view match against Hulk Hogan and disagreements over pay. Following this, he permanently retires from in-ring action.

== Production ==
The idea for a retrospective on Ultimate Warrior began in 2005 as a way for the company to take advantage of its large video library. According to some people who worked on the project, Warrior was invited to contribute to the project, but he declined. The documentary was the first WWE production to significantly feature Warrior since his departure from the company in 1996. In addition to the main documentary, the DVD release contains several of Warrior's wrestling matches as bonus features, as well as other anecdotes and personal stories that interviewees had regarding Warrior.

== Release and reception ==
The documentary was released on DVD on September 27, 2005. Following the release of the DVD, Warrior sued WWE, though his case was dismissed.

Overall, the documentary received mixed reviews from critics. In a 2005 review, professional wrestling website 411Mania gave the film a "mild recommendation", saying, "it's not that great as a DVD, but it is a pretty good example of the locker room culture in the late 1980s WWF". A later reappraisal on 411Mania in 2008 gave the film a rating of 7.2 out of 10, highlighting the bonus feature matches and the overall look at Warrior's career as highlights, while criticizing the long runtime and overall negative portrayal of the subject. In 2013, the documentary received a negative review from WrestleCrap, a professional wrestling website that chronicles, in its own words, "the very worst of professional wrestling".

Many reviewers criticized the documentary for its overall negative portrayal of Warrior. WWE executive Bruce Prichard addressed this in a 2016 episode of his podcast Something to Wrestle with Bruce Prichard, where he stated that the intent of the documentary was not to smear Warrior's name, but that, during the course of the production, many of the interviewees and people involved held very poor opinions of Warrior, which influenced the overall tone of the project. A 2021 review on the website The Sportster calls the film "a one-sided attempt at character assassination" and described it as a hit piece. In the same review, they state that "regardless of what Warrior was truly like as a person, the fact that his former employers released a whole film about how much everyone hated him is truly bizarre." By 2014, the relationship between Warrior and WWE had improved to the point that he was inducted into the 2014 WWE Hall of Fame. During his induction speech, Warrior mentioned the documentary several times, including saying, "The DVD was just wrong, that's all. And it did make me angry but it also, it was hurtful".
