= In Your House 7: Good Friends, Better Enemies =

1996 World Wrestling Federation pay-per-view event

- VHS cover featuring various WWF wrestlers
- Promotion: World Wrestling Federation
- Date: April 28, 1996
- City: Omaha, Nebraska
- Venue: Omaha Civic Auditorium
- Attendance: 9,563
- Buy rate: 165,000

Pay-per-view chronology
← Previous; WrestleMania XII	Next → In Your House 8: Beware of Dog

In Your House chronology
← Previous; 6	Next → Beware of Dog

In Your House 7: Good Friends, Better Enemies was a 1996 professional wrestling pay-per-view (PPV) event produced by the World Wrestling Federation (WWF, renamed WWE in 2002). It was the seventh In Your House and took place on April 28, 1996, at the Omaha Civic Auditorium in Omaha, Nebraska. It was the first In Your House to originally carry a subtitle; the previous events had their subtitles added retroactively. The name of the show was based on the rivalry between friends turned enemies Shawn Michaels and Diesel.

The event consisted of nine professional wrestling matches, five of which were broadcast live on pay-per-view. The main event of the show saw Shawn Michaels defeat Diesel in a No Holds Barred match to retain the WWF Championship. Other matches on the card included The Bodydonnas (Skip and Zip) retaining the WWF Tag Team Championship by defeating The Godwinns (Henry O. Godwinn and Phineas I. Godwinn) and Ultimate Warrior defeating WWF Intercontinental Champion Goldust by countout; however, as titles do not change hands by countout unless stipulated, Warrior did not win the title.

The event marked the last televised WWF appearances of Kevin Nash and Scott Hall (as Diesel and Razor Ramon, respectively) before their departure for World Championship Wrestling (WCW); the two would return to the WWF in 2002.

== Background ==
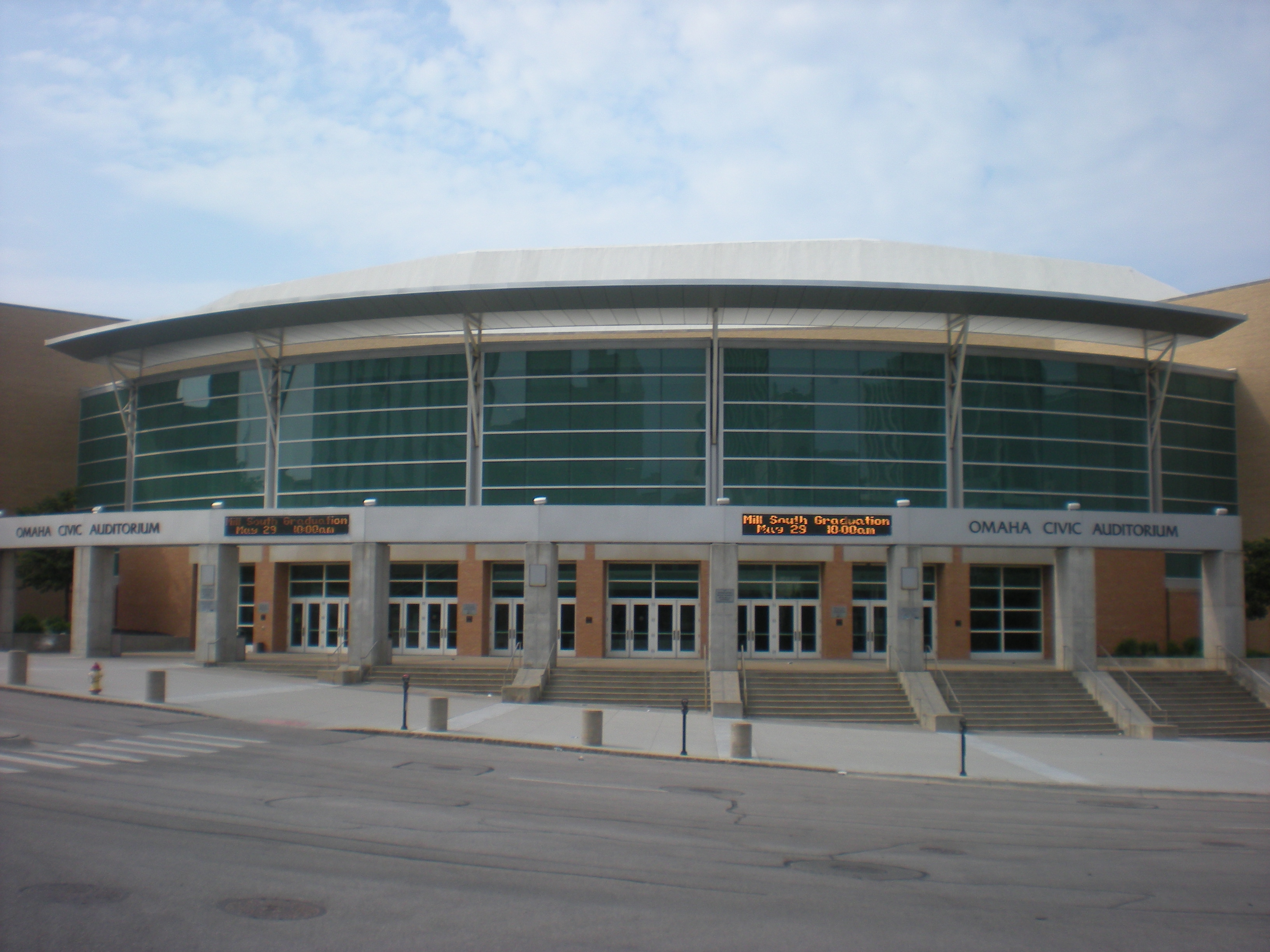
The seventh In Your House was held at the Omaha Civic Auditorium in Omaha, Nebraska.

In Your House was a series of monthly professional wrestling pay-per-view (PPV) events first produced by the World Wrestling Federation (WWF, renamed WWE in 2002) in May 1995. They aired when the promotion was not holding one of its then-five major PPVs (WrestleMania, King of the Ring, SummerSlam, Survivor Series, and Royal Rumble) and were sold at a lower cost. In Your House 7: Good Friends, Better Enemies was scheduled for April 28, 1996, at the Omaha Civic Auditorium in Omaha, Nebraska. It was the first In Your House to originally carry a subtitle; the previous ones had subtitles retroactively added at a later time. The name of the show was based on the rivalry between friends turned enemies Shawn Michaels and Diesel.

== Event ==
Before the event aired live on pay-per-view, Marc Mero (with Sable) wrestled The 1–2–3 Kid (Sean Waltman) (with Ted DiBiase) in a standard wrestling match on WWF Free for All. The 1–2–3 Kid was disqualified when Hunter Hearst Helmsley interfered and attacked Mero.

=== Preliminary matches ===
The first match to air live on pay-per-view was scheduled to be a singles match between The British Bulldog and Jake "The Snake" Roberts. Bulldog was accompanied by Owen Hart, Jim Cornette and Cornette's storyline attorney Clarence Mason, while Roberts entered the ring with his pet python. It had been revealed the previous weekend that Bulldog was extremely afraid of snakes and because of this, Mason presented the referee with a document ordering the snake to be placed backstage. Roberts tore the paper to shreds, took the snake out of its bag, and charged at Mason and Cornette before taking the snake to the locker room. Roberts returned to the ring with Ahmed Johnson and the match became a tag team match pitting Bulldog and Hart against Roberts and Johnson. Jake and Ahmed controlled much of the match until the Bulldog and Hart gained the upper-hand when Bulldog distracted the referee, allowing Hart to choke Roberts. Bulldog and Hart took turns wearing down Roberts until he countered a sleeper hold by Owen and tagged Ahmed. Johnson came in strong and soon tagged Roberts back in. Shortly afterwards, all four participants were scattered around the ring area. The referee focused on Hart fighting with Johnson outside of the ring, while Bulldog struck Roberts multiple times in the knee with Cornette's tennis racquet. Bulldog then grabbed Roberts' leg and applied pressure to the knee, forcing Roberts to submit.

Next, Goldust defended his WWF Intercontinental Championship against Ultimate Warrior. The match began with Goldust being chased out of the ring by Warrior, where he stayed for the next several minutes while his valet Marlena and bodyguard attempted to distract Warrior. Warrior took possession of Goldust's robe and Marlena's director's chair, which prompted the two to return to the ring and retrieve the items. Goldust put on his robe, sat in the chair and presented his hand for Warrior to kiss. Instead, Warrior took Marlena's lit cigar, burned Goldust's hand and then clotheslined him out of the chair. Goldust ran from the ring and was counted-out. Because championships cannot change hands on a countout, Goldust retained the title.

After the match, the British Bulldog was shown backstage, attempting to enter Shawn Michaels' locker room, as officials Dave Hebner and Tony Garea were trying to hold him back as Dok Hendrix reported that Michaels had said something about his wife Diana.

In the next match, Vader (with Jim Cornette) squared off against Razor Ramon. Vader controlled much of the match until Ramon attempted a "Razor's Edge" but was countered with a back drop. Vader then performed a seated senton, in which he jumped and sat onto Ramon's chest and covered him for the pinfall. Following the match, Vader was informed that because of his victory he would be allowed to wrestle Yokozuna, whose leg he had injured on Raw three weeks prior, at the next month's In Your House pay-per-view.

The following match was a tag team match for the WWF World Tag Team Championship between the challengers, The Godwinns (Henry O. Godwinn and Phineas I. Godwinn) and the champions, The Bodydonnas (Skip and Zip) accompanied by Sunny. The action was back and forth until Sunny went to the locker room and returned to ringside with a framed, autographed portrait of herself and gave it to Phineas, who believed that Sunny genuinely liked him. Meanwhile, Henry performed the "Slop Drop" on Skip and then attempted to get Phineas away from Sunny. This led to the referee being distracted with the situation and allowed Zip to enter the ring, rolling Skip out and pretending to be him. Henry turned his attention back to who he thought was a knocked-out Skip, when Zip rolled Henry into a small package for the pinfall to retain the championship. Because Skip and Zip's appearance were similar and sometimes hard to tell apart from a rear view, the referee did not realize the illegal man made the pin.

Other on-screen personnel
Role:	Name:
Commentator	Vince McMahon
Commentator	Jerry Lawler
Interviewer	Dok Hendrix
Interviewer	Curt Hennig
Ring announcer	Howard Finkel
Referee	Tim White
Referee	Jack Doan
Referee	Mike Chioda
Referee	Earl Hebner

=== Main event ===
In the final match to air live on pay-per-view, Diesel challenged WWF Champion Shawn Michaels in a No Holds Barred match. During Diesel's entrance, Maurice "Mad Dog" Vachon, who lives in Omaha, was shown at ringside in the audience. The match began with Michaels entering the ring quickly, ducked a clothesline from Diesel, and nailed him with multiple right and left hands to the chin until Diesel connected hard with a high knee to his chest. Michaels recovered and knocked Diesel outside the ring and performed a moonsault from the top rope to Diesel while still out of the ring. Shawn then snatched a boot off of Spanish commentator Hugo Savinovich, climbed the top rope, and hit Diesel in the head with it. Diesel soon got the upper-hand by knocking Shawn into the steel ringside barricade. Diesel controlled the match for several minutes before turning the match up a notch by taking the belt off the pants of referee Earl Hebner and choked Michaels with it. His next weapon of choice was a steel chair. Diesel continued his assault on Michaels when he powerbombed him through a ringside announcers table. Back-and-forth action started after Michaels managed to grab a fire extinguisher and sprayed Diesel in the face. Diesel eventually turned his sights to Vachon. He grabbed Vachon out of his chair and threw him to the floor. He then pulled off Vachon's artificial leg and attempted to hit Michaels with it, but was hit with a low blow which allowed Michaels to grab the leg and nail Diesel with it. This set up sweet chin music and Michaels pinned Diesel to retain the WWF World Heavyweight Championship.

Backstage, Dok Hendrix interviewed Paul Bearer and The Undertaker and announced that at next month's In Your House, Goldust would defend the WWF Intercontinental Championship against Undertaker. After an interview of Hunter Hearst Helmsley, Gorilla Monsoon announced that Shawn Michaels would defend his WWF World Heavyweight Championship against the British Bulldog at next month's PPV. During this announcement, Bulldog entered the room and shouted, "That dirty rotten pervert Shawn Michaels! He wants to sleep with my wife? I can't wait for May 26! I'm gonna finish him right now!", before storming off as the pay-per-view ended.

=== Dark matches ===
After the event went off the air, three dark matches took place, all of which were standard singles matches. Savio Vega defeated Steve Austin;The Undertaker defeated Mankind; Hunter Hearst Helmsley defeated Marc Mero.

== Reception ==
The WWF earned $120,668 in ticket revenue with an attendance of 9,563.

== Aftermath ==
The event was notable for being the last televised WWF event for Diesel (Kevin Nash) and Razor Ramon (Scott Hall) until 2002. Both men would sign with main competitor World Championship Wrestling (WCW) shortly thereafter and form the New World Order with Hulk Hogan in July.

Prior to leaving WWF, Nash and Hall alongside Shawn Michaels and Hunter Hearst Helmsley were involved in a controversial incident on May 19, 1996 during a live event at Madison Square Garden that would be known as The MSG "Curtain Call", where after a match between Michaels and Diesel had ended, both Hall and Helmsley entered the ring and they alongside Michaels and Diesel would embrace in a group hug despite Michaels and Hall being fan favourites and Diesel and Helmsley being heels.

Shawn Michaels immediately began a heated rivalry with the British Bulldog. As a result of the match made for the following month's In Your House between the two, Goldust began a feud with The Undertaker. In the weeks leading up to their Casket match at In Your House, and during the match itself, Mankind assisted Goldust by continually attacking Undertaker which then led to a feud between Mankind and Undertaker. Vader restarted his feud with Yokozuna. The Godwinns went on to win the WWF Tag Team Championship from The Bodydonnas in a rematch on May 19.

The dark match between the Undertaker and Mankind was included as part of the WWE's Attitude Era Volume 3 - Unreleased DVD and Blu Ray sets.

== Results ==
No.	Results	Stipulations	Times
1^{F}	Marc Mero (with Sable) defeated The 1–2–3 Kid (with Ted DiBiase) by disqualification	Singles match	7:17
2	Owen Hart and The British Bulldog defeated Ahmed Johnson and Jake Roberts by submission	Tag team match	13:47
3	Ultimate Warrior defeated Goldust (c) (with Bodyguard and Marlena) by countout	Singles match for the WWF Intercontinental Championship	7:38
4	Vader (with Jim Cornette) defeated Razor Ramon	Singles match	14:49
5	The Bodydonnas (Skip and Zip) (c) (with Sunny) defeated The Godwinns (Henry O. Godwinn and Phineas I. Godwinn) (with Hillbilly Jim)	Tag team match for the WWF Tag Team Championship	7:17
6	Shawn Michaels (c) (with José Lothario) defeated Diesel	No Holds Barred match for the WWF Championship	17:53
7^{D}	Savio Vega defeated "Stone Cold" Steve Austin (with Ted DiBiase)	Singles match	10:38
8^{D}	The Undertaker defeated Mankind (with Paul Bearer)	Singles match	13:24
9^{D}	Hunter Hearst Helmsley defeated Marc Mero (with Sable)	Singles match	14:10
(c) / – the champion(s) heading into the match; F / – the match was broadcast prior to the pay-per-view on Free for All; D / – this was a dark match
