= Ultimate Warrior =

American professional wrestler and bodybuilder (1959–2014)

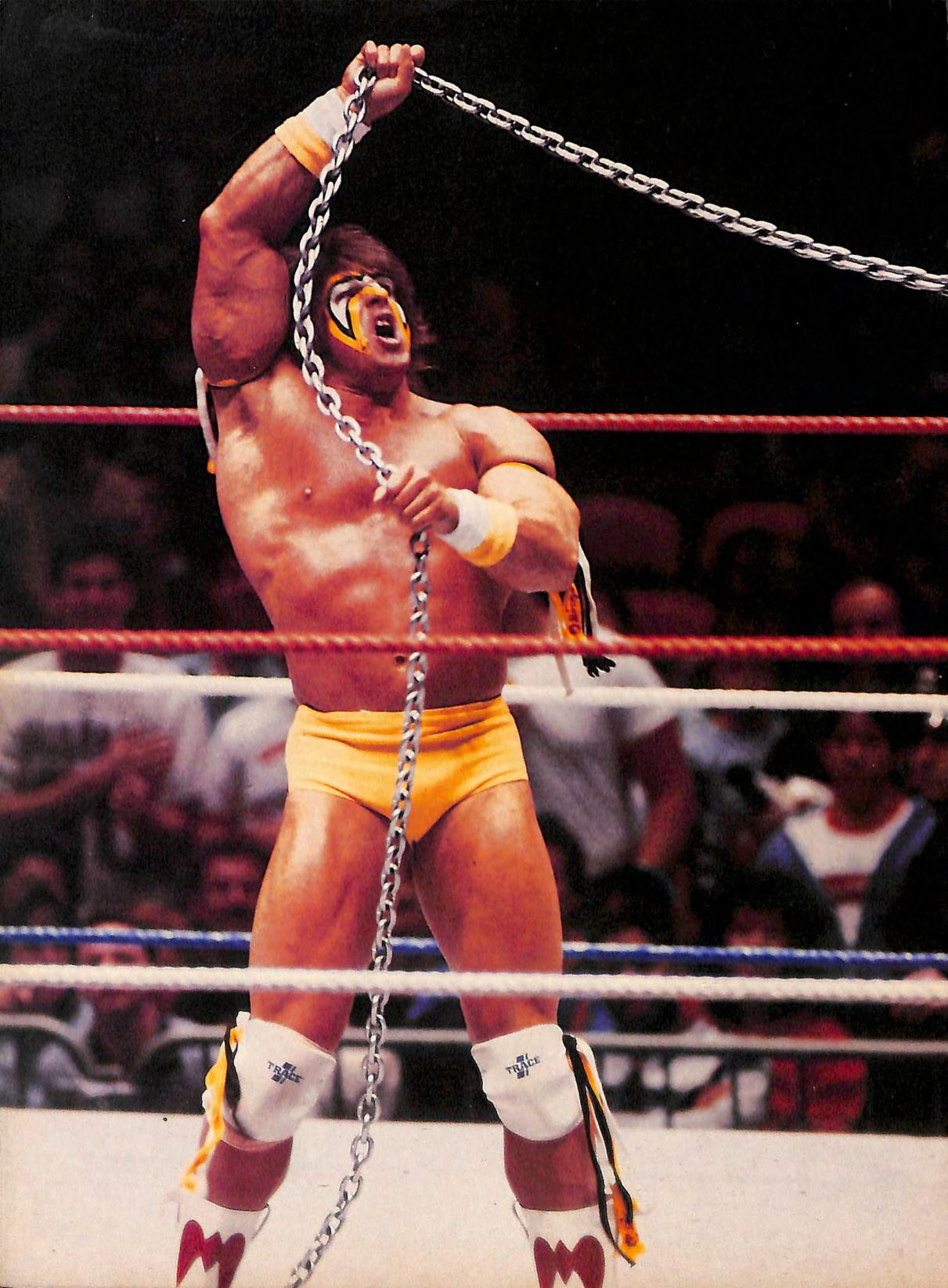
- Ultimate Warrior in 1988

Personal information
- Born: James Brian Hellwig; June 16, 1959 Crawfordsville, Indiana, U.S.
- Died: April 8, 2014 (aged 54) Scottsdale, Arizona, U.S.
- Spouses: Shari Tyree (m. 1982; div. 1991); Dana Warrior (m. 1999)
- Children: 2

Professional wrestling career
- Ring names: Blade Runner Rock; Dingo Warrior; Jim Hellwig; Jim Justice; Ultimate Warrior; Warrior
- Billed height: 6 ft 2 in (188 cm)
- Billed weight: 280 lb (127 kg)
- Billed from: "Parts unknown" Queens, New York "One Warrior Nation"
- Trained by: Billy Anderson; Rick Bassman; Red Bastien
- Debut: November 23, 1985
- Retired: June 25, 2008

Warrior (born James Brian Hellwig, June 16, 1959 – April 8, 2014), better known by his ring name, Ultimate Warrior, was an American professional wrestler, bodybuilder and motivational speaker. He wrestled for the World Wrestling Federation (WWF, now WWE) from 1987 to 1992, where he was a WWF Intercontinental Champion and WWF Champion. He had a short stint back in the WWF in 1996, as well as a few months in World Championship Wrestling (WCW) in 1998, in which he was simply known as the Warrior.

After a career in bodybuilding, he turned to professional wrestling. From 1985 to 1986, he was paired with fellow former bodybuilder Steve Borden, later known as Sting, as the Blade Runners. The two split when he left to pursue a singles career in the World Class Wrestling Association (WCWA). Under the ring name Dingo Warrior, he was a one-time WCWA Texas Heavyweight Champion.

In 1987, he joined the World Wrestling Federation, and became a two-time WWF Intercontinental Heavyweight Champion within two years. In the main event of WrestleMania VI, in 1990, the Warrior won the WWF Championship in a title vs. title match over Hulk Hogan, making him the first wrestler to hold both titles concurrently. Positioned as the new face of the company, he had a falling out with chairman Vince McMahon over a pay dispute, and unsuccessfully attempted to leave the WWF, with which he was under contract. Warrior returned at WrestleMania VIII, but by November 1992, he had been released; it was later revealed that this was due to steroid use.

In 1993, James Hellwig legally changed his name to the mononym "Warrior" and was credited as a co-writer for a comic book based on his name and likeness. Warrior returned to the WWF at WrestleMania XII, but lasted four months, as he began no-showing events. Two years later, he joined World Championship Wrestling (which had tried to hire him in 1995), being used in a much-maligned storyline with Hogan, which culminated at Halloween Havoc. Warrior retired from professional wrestling and subsequently embarked on a public speaking career, but wrestled one final match in Spain in 2008.

Warrior died on April 8, 2014, at the age of 54 in Scottsdale, Arizona. On the preceding three nights in New Orleans, he had been inducted into the WWE Hall of Fame, appeared at WrestleMania XXX, and made his final public appearance on Monday Night Raw, returning to the promotion after his acrimonious separation in 1996.

== Early life ==
Warrior was born in 1959 as James Brian Hellwig, in Crawfordsville, Indiana, about 50 miles (80 km) northwest of Indianapolis. He was the oldest of five children and was raised by his mother (along with, later, his stepfather) after his father left his family when he was 12. His father died at 57 and a grandfather died at 52. The family moved and he graduated from Veedersburg's Fountain Central High School and attended Indiana State University for a year.

== Bodybuilding career ==
Prior to his career in professional wrestling, Jim Hellwig was an amateur bodybuilder, competing in a number of NPC contests and winning the 1984 NPC Mr. Georgia crown. He started training with weights when he was 11 years old and described himself as "the small, insecure kid who wasn't into any sports". He moved to California where, after seeing bodybuilder Robby Robinson, he decided to take up the sport. His first contest took place in Florida, where he placed 5th.

Later, while he was attending Life University in Marietta, Georgia, he won the Junior Atlanta contest and placed 5th at the 1981 AAU Collegiate Mr. America. In 1983, he won the AAU Coastal USA, before taking the Mr. Georgia title the following year. His last bodybuilding contest was 1985's Junior USAs, which was won by future IFBB Pro, Ron Love; Hellwig finished 5th.

In 1985, after spending six weeks in California training for a bodybuilding contest, he was invited to join a group of bodybuilders – Garland Donoho, Mark Miller, and Steve Borden – to form a professional wrestling team. He accepted the invitation and abandoned his bodybuilding career as well as his plans to become a chiropractor.

== Professional wrestling career ==
=== Continental Wrestling Association (1985–1986) ===
Hellwig began his professional wrestling career as Jim "Justice" Hellwig of Powerteam USA, the group of bodybuilders trained by Red Bastien and Rick Bassman. Hellwig and fellow trainee Steve Borden (who later had success as "Sting") formed a tag team called the Freedom Fighters, with Hellwig adopting the ring name "Justice" and Borden the ring name "Flash".

The Freedom Fighters debuted in the Memphis, Tennessee-based Continental Wrestling Association (CWA) promotion, run by Jerry Jarrett, in November 1985. The team played babyfaces at first, but fans were actually slow to take to the hulking duo in a territory that had featured sympathetic "good guy tag teams" like the Rock 'n' Roll Express and the Fabulous Ones. They were quickly turned heel under "coach" Buddy Wayne and soon afterwards manager Dutch Mantel.

In January 1986, the Freedom Fighters entered a tournament for the vacant AWA Southern Tag Team Championship, defeating Phil Hickerson and The Spoiler in the quarterfinals but losing to eventual tournament winners the Fantastics in the semifinals. They left the CWA later that month.

=== Universal Wrestling Federation (1986) ===
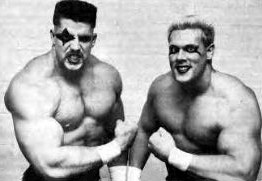
Warrior (left) with Blade Runner Sting as the Blade Runners, c. 1986

In March 1986, Warrior and Borden joined Bill Watts' Oklahoma-based Universal Wrestling Federation (UWF), where they joined "Hotstuff" Eddie Gilbert's Hotstuff International group and feuded with Steve Williams and Ted DiBiase. The former Freedom Fighters were rebranded the Blade Runners, with Hellwig being "Blade Runner Rock" and Borden being "Blade Runner Sting". According to Road Warrior Animal, Watts created the Blade Runners as a parody of the Road Warriors.

In May 1986, Blade Runner Rock entered a tournament for the newly created UWF Heavyweight Championship, but was eliminated by Ted DiBiase in the first round. On June 14 at the "Superdome Extravaganza" event in the Louisiana Superdome, the Blade Runners lost to the Fabulous Freebirds. Hellwig subsequently left the UWF, disbanding the Blade Runners.

=== World Class Wrestling Association (1986–1987) ===
In June 1986, he debuted in the Dallas, Texas-based World Class Wrestling Association (WCWA) promotion, where he wrestled for $50 a night (equivalent to $147 in 2025). He has stated that he adopted the ring name "Dingo Warrior" after a member of the WCWA locker room remarked that he looked like "a warrior". This stood in contrast with a claim made by Road Warrior Animal, who stated that the Dingo Warrior was a recreation of the Blade Runner gimmick and was an attempt to present himself as an offspring of the Road Warriors. Animal even noted how the Dingo Warrior face-paint design bore great resemblance to that which Road Warrior Hawk used at the time.

Initially, Warrior was a heel in the territory, managed by Gary Hart, although he was cheered during a heel versus heel feud with WCWA World Heavyweight Champion Rick Rude after the two fell out during a tag match. After switching managers to Percival Pringle III, Warrior turned babyface in September 1986 after a falling out with fellow Pringle proteges Buzz Sawyer and Matt Borne after a six-man tag match. In October 1986 at the 3rd Cotton Bowl Extravaganza, Warrior teamed with Steve Simpson to unsuccessfully challenge WCWA World Tag Team Champions Matt Borne and Buzz Sawyer. On November 17, 1986, Warrior and Lance Von Erich defeated Borne and Master Gee (substituting for Sawyer) to win the Championship. They held the Championship until December 1 of that year, when they lost to Al Madril and Brian Adias.

In 1987, Warrior began competing for the WCWA Texas Heavyweight Championship, losing to Bob Bradley in a tournament final on January 12. He won the title from Bradley on February 2 of that year. At Wrestling Star Wars in February 1987, Warrior successfully defended the title against Bradley. The title was held up in April 1987 after Warrior left the WCWA. He was reinstated as champion upon returning, but vacated it once more upon resigning from the WCWA to join the World Wrestling Federation. Warrior made his final appearance with the WCWA in June 1987.

=== World Wrestling Federation (1987–1992) ===
==== Early push (1987–1988) ====
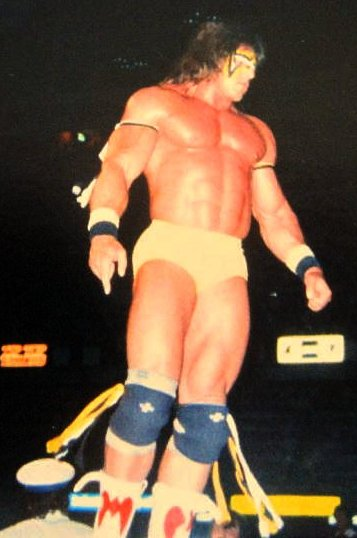
Ultimate Warrior in 1987

Hellwig joined the World Wrestling Federation (WWF) in June 1987. He was initially billed as Dingo Warrior in house card promos by Gene Okerlund, but soon had his name modified. There is a dispute over who created the full Ultimate Warrior name. Bruce Prichard stated that Vince McMahon did not know what a "Dingo Warrior" was, but because there was the "Modern Day Warrior" Kerry von Erich and The Road Warriors there should not be one more simple warrior, but an Ultimate Warrior. Hellwig claimed after one of his first matches, McMahon had him do a pre-taped promo. It was there Vince said "we want you to do Warrior, but we don't want Dingo." He then proceeded to cut the promo and stated that he was not this warrior or that warrior, he was the "Ultimate Warrior".

He defeated a series of jobbers, including Steve Lombardi, Barry Horowitz and Mike Sharpe. He made his television debut as Ultimate Warrior on the October 25 episode of Wrestling Challenge, in which he defeated another jobber, Terry Gibbs. As the Ultimate Warrior character, Warrior became known for his impassioned babbling, incomprehensible commentary and high-energy ring entrances, which featured him racing into the arena full speed, bursting into the ring, and violently shaking the ring ropes up and down. He was also known for his distinctive pattern of face paint.

After several months of defeating jobbers, Ultimate Warrior was pinned for the first time in the WWF by fellow WWF rookie/future rival Rick Rude on December 28, 1987. In January 1988, he competed in the inaugural Royal Rumble, being eliminated by Dino Bravo and One Man Gang.

In early 1988, Warrior entered into his first real WWF feud with fellow strongman Hercules Hernandez. The two faced off on the February 7, 1988, airing of Wrestling Challenge, during which Hercules was disqualified for using his steel chain. Warrior then grabbed ahold of the chain and in the midst of a tug of war over it, the chain snapped. This led to a match at WrestleMania IV, at which Warrior was victorious in his pay-per-view debut.

Warrior lost twice by pinfall shortly thereafter: cleanly to André the Giant in April in Italy, and to Dino Bravo, who put his feet on the ropes for leverage, in Montreal in June. In the summer of 1988, he wrestled Bobby Heenan in a series of "weasel suit" matches, in which Warrior typically won by sleeper hold.

==== Intercontinental Heavyweight Champion (1988–1990) ====
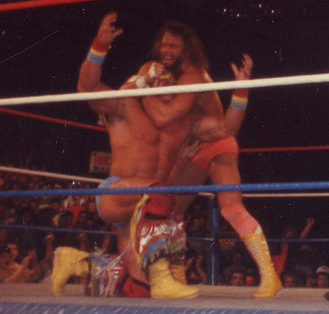
Warrior wrestling Randy Savage on March 7, 1989, at the El Paso Civic Center. Ultimate Warrior would go on to "retire" Savage at WrestleMania VII.

Less than a year after his WWF television debut, Warrior, a surprise substitute for the injured Brutus Beefcake, won the WWF Intercontinental Heavyweight Championship, defeating The Honky Tonk Man in a 27-second squash match at the inaugural SummerSlam on August 29, 1988, and ending The Honky Tonk Man's long reign at 454 days. At Saturday Night's Main Event XVIII on November 16, he successfully defended the title against Super Ninja. As champion, he captained a team at Survivor Series, where he was the sole survivor, pinning "Outlaw" Ron Bass and Greg Valentine in succession to win the match for his team. At Saturday Night's Main Event XIX on December 7, he successfully defended the WWF Intercontinental Heavyweight Championship against The Honky Tonk Man.

As 1989 began, Ultimate Warrior entered a feud with Rick Rude over the Intercontinental Championship. The feud was sparked at the 1989 Royal Rumble, where the two met in a "super pose down". After Warrior drew the support of the live crowd in their judging of the contest, Rude attacked Ultimate Warrior and choked him with a steel bar. At The Main Event II, Ultimate Warrior successfully defended the Intercontinental Championship against Greg Valentine. At WrestleMania V, Ultimate Warrior defended the title against Rude; Rude pinned Warrior to win the title with the help of his manager Bobby Heenan, who held down Warrior's foot from outside the ring as he was being pinned. At SummerSlam, Warrior defeated Rude to regain the title and become a two-time Intercontinental Heavyweight Champion.

In September 1989, Warrior began a feud with André the Giant, leading to a number of house shows in which Warrior defeated André in short squash matches, establishing Warrior as a main event level talent. At Saturday Night's Main Event XXIV on October 31, Warrior defeated André by disqualification after Bobby Heenan attacked Warrior. In November 1989 at Survivor Series Showdown, Warrior defeated Heenan Family member Tully Blanchard by disqualification. The feud culminated later that month at Survivor Series, where the two captained opposing teams. Warrior eliminated André by knocking him out of the ring, where he was counted out. Warrior was again the sole survivor, pinning Arn Anderson and Bobby Heenan to win the match.

In December 1989, Ultimate Warrior began a feud with Dino Bravo over the Intercontinental Heavyweight Championship, including a dark match at the No Holds Barred: The Match/The Movie pay-per-view event in December 1989. The feud culminated in a bout at The Main Event III in February 1990 which was won by Ultimate Warrior.

==== WWF Champion (1990–1991) ====
Ultimate Warrior received a push as WWF's main event level successor to Hulk Hogan, who had remained wrestling's biggest star throughout the 1980s. At Saturday Night's Main Event XXV on January 3, 1990, Ultimate Warrior teamed with Hogan to defeat Mr. Perfect and The Genius. Following a few interactions with Hogan, most notably at the 1990 Royal Rumble, the Warrior was named Hogan's opponent in the main event for WrestleMania VI at the SkyDome in Toronto. The match was billed as "The Ultimate Challenge", as both Hogan's WWF Championship and Warrior's Intercontinental Heavyweight Championship were on the line. Warrior pinned Hogan after a Warrior Splash to become the only wrestler to hold both championships simultaneously. Warrior vacated the Intercontinental Heavyweight Championship (which Mr. Perfect then won in a tournament), as WWF rules prohibited a wrestler from holding both titles.

At the WWF/AJPW/NJPW Wrestling Summit in the Tokyo Dome on April 13, Ultimate Warrior successfully defended the WWF Championship against Ted DiBiase. He went on to successfully defend the championship against challengers such as Haku and Mr. Perfect. At SummerSlam, he retained the title over Rick Rude in a steel cage match. "Macho Man" Randy Savage was also introduced as a potential rival after interfering in a The Main Event IV title match at the behest of DiBiase.

Warrior was inserted into the feud between the Legion of Doom and Demolition, leading to victories for the Warrior and the Legion of Doom in six-man tag team matches in house shows as well as the October 13, 1990, airing of Saturday Night's Main Event XXVIII. The feud culminated at Survivor Series, where "the Warriors" (Ultimate Warrior, Legion of Doom, and Kerry Von Erich) defeated "the Perfect Team" (Mr. Perfect and Demolition). For the third consecutive year, Warrior was the sole survivor for his team. He later survived the "Grand Finale Match of Survival" with Hulk Hogan.

In January 1991, Warrior faced Sgt. Slaughter at the Royal Rumble. Slaughter's gimmick at the time was a traitor who had betrayed America by aligning himself with an Iraqi (kayfabe) military general, General Adnan. In the context of the Gulf War, this made Slaughter one of the most hated heels at the time. After rejecting an earlier request to grant a title shot to Savage, Sensational Sherri interjected herself in the Warrior's championship match to distract him. Her interference eventually led to a Savage sneak attack, where he struck Warrior over the head with a metal scepter and allowed Slaughter to pin Warrior to win the title. Following the Royal Rumble, Warrior faced Slaughter in a series of rematches, but was unable to regain the title.

==== Various feuds; contract dispute (1991) ====
Ultimate Warrior (left) facing Randy Savage in a cage match in January 1991

Following his loss to Sgt. Slaughter, Warrior went on to feud with Randy Savage. On the January 21, 1991 episode of WWF on MSG Network, Warrior faced Savage in a cage match; Savage won the bout by escaping the cage following interference from Sherri. The rivalry culminated in a "Career-Ending" match at WrestleMania VII which Warrior won, forcing Savage to retire. On March 30, 1991, at the Wrestlefest in Tokyo Dome event jointly promoted by the WWF and Super World of Sports, Warrior defeated Sgt. Slaughter.

The next chapter of Warrior's career was an encounter with The Undertaker, after Undertaker and his manager, Paul Bearer, locked Warrior in a coffin on the set of Bearer's Funeral Parlor on the April 13, 1991 episode of WWF Superstars. WWF officials worked feverishly to break the casket open, finally revealing Warrior's seemingly lifeless body, and the torn fabric inside of the coffin indicating Warrior's desperate struggle to get out. Warrior was finally revived by the officials performing CPR. (It was later revealed in a 2010 interview with Bearer that, in preparation for the segment, he and his team had to remove the airtight rubber seal or "gasket" from around the coffin's lid and drill air holes in said lid to allow for breathable space, so that Warrior would not suffocate because "he had enough brain damage as it was, and we wouldn't want to give him any more", implying that Warrior had been faking his own death the whole time.) This led to Jake "The Snake" Roberts offering to give Warrior "the knowledge of the dark side" in order to prepare Warrior to take his revenge on the Undertaker. This involved Roberts giving Warrior three "tests" shown on WWF television in consecutive weeks. For the first test, Roberts locked Warrior once again inside the same coffin as previously. For the second test, Warrior was "buried alive" by Roberts. For the third and final test, which aired on the August 17, 1991 episode of WWF Superstars, the Warrior entered a room full of snakes, to find "the answer" in a chest in the middle of the room. Waiting inside the chest was a spitting cobra which bit Warrior in the face. As Warrior, weakened from the effects of the cobra's strike, Roberts made a heel turn and was joined by the Undertaker and Paul Bearer, revealing the three were working together all along. Roberts then uttered, "Never trust a snake." The stage was now set for a feud between the Warrior and Roberts, which ultimately never took place.

On July 10, 1991, Warrior sent a letter to McMahon requesting inclusions in his new WWF contract. He wanted $550,000 (equivalent to $1,300,000 in 2025) for performing at WrestleMania VII, a guaranteed number of working days, travel accommodations and a higher percentage of merchandise sales. He remarked that $550,000 "was fair", and that "[Warrior] meant as much or more to the show than Hulk [Hogan]". He ended his letter with "Whatever your decision, I can and will live with it. Till then I remain home with one who cares". The WWF responded on July 13, agreeing to $550,000 for WrestleMania VII, a higher royalty rate and promising no other WWF performer would be paid more than him on WWF pay per views. McMahon personally ended the letter by saying, "I would like to express my deepest appreciation and admiration for you as a performer, as a member of the WWF family, as a man, and as my friend".

At SummerSlam on August 26, 1991, Warrior teamed with Hulk Hogan in a handicap match against Sgt. Slaughter, Colonel Mustafa, and General Adnan. Following the event, Warrior was handed a letter dated August 26, 1991, from McMahon, saying Warrior was suspended effective immediately. Among other things, McMahon said, "You threatened to stay at home thereby not even appearing at Titan's major summer pay-per-view event SummerSlam. I had no choice but to accede to your exorbitant demands. This was a serious mistake on your part". McMahon later testified that the only reason the company agreed to the contract was to "acquiesce to his demands temporarily" to ensure Warrior would perform at the SummerSlam event. Upon receiving the letter, Warrior refused the suspension and left the WWF. Warrior formally sent a letter of resignation to the WWF in October 1991. The WWF refused to accept the letter since Warrior was under contract until September 1992.

==== Ultimate Maniacs; departure (1992) ====
With Hulk Hogan about to leave the WWF, McMahon contacted Warrior about returning. He made his comeback in April 1992 at WrestleMania VIII, rescuing Hulk Hogan from a beat down at the hands of Sid Justice and Papa Shango. Upon his return, he received a degree of creative control over his bookings. One storyline involved Papa Shango, a "witch doctor", casting a spell over Warrior, causing him to convulse and vomit in very odd colors, though Warrior says he hated that story and had no control over it.

Due to the drastic change in his appearance (shorter, blonder hair and a smaller physique), rumors began circulating that a new wrestler was playing the role. At the time it was rumored to be Kerry Von Erich, who was then under contract to the WWF. Some said Warrior died from liver failure due to years of steroid abuse or that his signature arm tassels cut off his blood circulation. WWE claims that the theory that a different man returned to portray Ultimate Warrior at WrestleMania VIII remains "perhaps the longest standing urban legend in WWE history". WWE announcer Tom Phillips claims that the rumors likely originated from Gene Okerlund's WCW Hotline as well as the WCW debut of Warrior doppelgänger The Renegade.

At SummerSlam Spectacular in August 1992, Ultimate Warrior teamed with WWF Champion Randy Savage to face the Nasty Boys; after Warrior and Savage failed to cooperate, the Nasty Boys won the bout by count-out. Later that month, Ultimate Warrior challenged Savage for the WWF Championship at SummerSlam; he won the match by count-out, but not the title. At Saturday Night's Main Event XXXI in October 1992, Ultimate Warrior and Savage again joined forces as the "Ultimate Maniacs" to challenge WWF Tag Team Champions Money Inc.; they won the bout by count-out, meaning the titles did not change hands. The Ultimate Maniacs were scheduled to face Ric Flair and Razor Ramon at Survivor Series in November 1992.

Warrior left the WWF on November 21, 1992, with his last match being a victory over Kamala on November 8 in Orlando, Florida; Mr. Perfect substituted for him at Survivor Series. The initial plan for Warrior's 1992 return was to eventually give him another run with the WWF Championship. Indeed, WWF writers had originally intended that Ultimate Warrior should be the one to accept Mr. Perfect's services - up for offer to either SummerSlam main event competitor - turning heel in the process of winning the title. However these plans were scrapped at a late stage due to the Warrior's refusal to turn heel after considering the collapse in merchandise sales which would have resulted. Furthermore, his return coincided with the government's crackdown on steroids in wrestling. Warrior was admittedly a heavy user of steroids during his professional wrestling career. In his book Sex, Lies and Headlocks, ESPN writer Shaun Assael stated that Canadian chemist Mauro Di Pasquale, who had been hired in June to monitor the WWF's new drug testing program and was known for being tough towards anyone who failed a drug test, nailed Warrior for steroid use in September and was able to successfully persuade McMahon, who was under federal scrutiny at the time for allegations of illegally supplying steroids to some of his wrestlers, to release Warrior from the company. However, in Warrior: The Ultimate Legend, McMahon claims that it was Warrior's experimenting with growth hormone which led to his departure; Warrior was suspended and, in return, skipped dates as he took offense to McMahon's actions.

=== Semi-retirement (1992–1996) ===
Between November 1992 and July 1995, Warrior was semi-retired. During his time away from the WWF, Warrior opened the short-lived "Warrior University", a professional wrestling school based in Scottsdale, Arizona.

In January 1993 he wrestled as the Dingo Warrior, defeating Hercules Hernandez in Billerica, Massachusetts, for Killer Kowalski's International Wrestling Federation.

In April 1993, he toured Europe for World Wrestlings Superstars in Germany.

On July 22, 1995, he returned to the ring for the National Wrestling Conference (NWC) promotion in Las Vegas, defeating The Honky Tonk Man. He had also wrestled a tour of Germany for Otto Wanz's Catch Wrestling Association (CWA) promotion where he defeated Ulf Herman.

On February 10, 1996, he defeated Jimmy Garvin in an independent show in Princeton, West Virginia.

=== World Wrestling Federation (1996) ===
Warrior returned to the WWF on March 31, 1996, defeating Hunter Hearst Helmsley at WrestleMania XII. He made his first appearance on Monday Night Raw on April 8, where he gave an in-ring interview and credited the "voices" of the "warriors" (his name for members of the WWF audience) for his return; he was then interrupted by Goldust. Warrior challenged for Goldust's Intercontinental Championship at In Your House 7: Good Friends, Better Enemies; Warrior won the match by count-out after Goldust fled the ring, but did not win the title. The following night on Monday Night Raw, Warrior defeated Isaac Yankem, DDS. At In Your House 8: Beware of Dog on May 26, Warrior defeated Owen Hart in a dark match. A rematch with Intercontinental Champion Goldust, on the May 27 episode of the show, ended in a double count-out, thus eliminating both men from the King of the Ring tournament and eventually giving Vader a bye into the semi-finals. Warrior defeated Jerry Lawler at King of the Ring on June 23 in a match that came about after Lawler criticized his comic book. He defeated Owen Hart by disqualification on the July 8 episode of Monday Night Raw. In his final match with the WWF, he defeated Vader in a dark match at a June 25 taping of WWF Superstars.

Warrior was scheduled to team with Shawn Michaels and Ahmed Johnson to face Owen Hart, Vader, and Davey Boy Smith at In Your House 9: International Incident on July 21, 1996, but the WWF terminated Warrior's contract when he missed several house shows, taking time off allegedly to grieve the death of his father. WWF owner Vince McMahon claimed that Warrior had not seen his father in ten years and did not care much for him; therefore, he did not take Warrior's excuse for missing house shows at face value. Warrior disputes McMahon's explanation, claiming that the real reason why he did not show up to those events was a breach of contract by McMahon, in which WWF sold Warrior's merchandise without giving him a percentage. He was replaced by the returning Sycho Sid at the pay-per-view.

=== World Championship Wrestling (1998) ===
WCW signed Warrior "at great expense" in May 1998. He formed a stable opposing Hollywood Hulk Hogan's New World Order (nWo): the "One Warrior Nation" using the initialism oWn as a play on the name nWo. Highlights of the storyline included Warrior kidnapping and "converting" The Disciple and frequent instances of "magic smoke" knocking out all of the nWo members except for Hollywood Hogan and covering Warrior's movement through a trapdoor in the ring. The trapdoor was responsible for nearly paralyzing Davey Boy Smith, when he awkwardly fell on it during a match at Fall Brawl 98. Though Alex Wright, who was also hurt in that match, didn't blame Warrior for the accident, he did blame management for not warning them about the trapdoor. Warrior's debut promo lasted 13 minutes, though Eric Bischoff would claim it unexpectedly lasted over 27 minutes, which was more than 20 minutes over its allotted time and forced Eric to do a massive rewrite of Nitro on the spot, including re-adding a commercial break that was supposed to take place during the promo.

Warrior only participated in three matches in WCW. The first was the WarGames match at Fall Brawl, where he competed as a member of Team WCW, competing against 8 other wrestlers for a shot at Goldberg's WCW World Heavyweight Championship at Halloween Havoc. Diamond Dallas Page won the match by pinning Stevie Ray. On the October 12 edition of Monday Nitro, he teamed with Sting to defeat Hogan and Bret Hart by disqualification. The third was his loss to Hogan at Halloween Havoc, in what is considered by many to be one of the worst wrestling matches ever staged. During the bout, Hogan attempted to "blind" The Warrior using flash paper, but was unable to light it properly, and as a result The Warrior was forced to briefly sell the move despite the flames clearly not touching him in any way. The match came to an end when Horace Hogan hit Warrior in the back with a chair, allowing Hogan to score the pinfall.

WCW claimed that attempts were made to save the storyline, though Warrior claimed in interviews and convention appearances that the only reason he was brought back was so Hogan could get a win over Warrior in return for Hogan's WrestleMania job. Warrior's last appearance in WCW was on the November 9, 1998, episode of Monday Nitro, when he came to the rescue of The Disciple who was being attacked by members of The nWo. Warrior retired from wrestling that year.

=== Late career and WWE Hall of Famer (2008–2014) ===
After retiring in 1998, Warrior only wrestled a single match on June 25, 2008, against Orlando Jordan in Barcelona, Spain. Warrior won the match and the Nu-Wrestling Evolution World Heavyweight Championship, but immediately vacated the title.

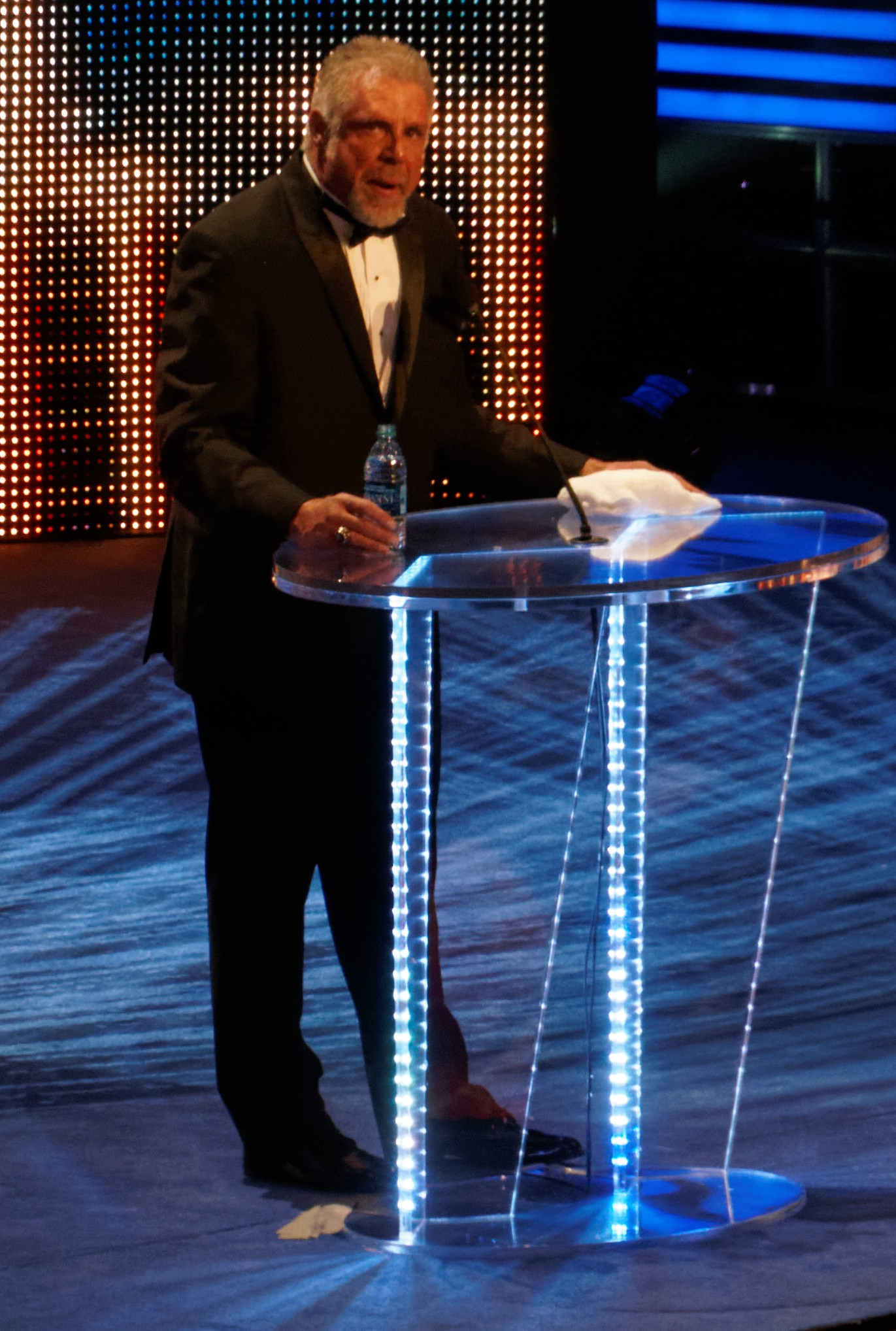
Warrior during his speech of induction at the WWE Hall of Fame in April 2014

On February 20, 2013, Warrior confirmed on his official YouTube channel that he would appear at "WrestleCon" on April 7, 2013. In the same clip he spoke positively about Vince McMahon for the first time on his channel. His appearance was so popular that a second print run of tickets had to be ordered.

On July 15, 2013, Warrior was featured in a WWE 2K14 game trailer and revealed he was in the roster as a pre-order bonus.

On April 5, 2014, Warrior was inducted into the WWE Hall of Fame Class of 2014. The next day, Warrior appeared at WrestleMania XXX, and the following night delivered a promo on Raw, his first appearance on the show since his final televised WWF match in 1996. During what turned out to be his final public appearance, Warrior gave a speech to the fans and wrestlers past and present as his Ultimate Warrior character.

== Public speaking career ==
Warrior formally retired from wrestling in 1999 and had a short-lived career as a conservative speaker and commentator, partnering with conservative spokesman Daniel Pinheiro, denouncing left-wing politics. In one instance, he mentioned that "queering doesn't make the world work" at the University of Connecticut.

== Personal life ==
=== Family and relationships ===
Warrior married Shari Lynn Tyree on October 2, 1982. They remained together for the majority of Warrior's WWF career before divorcing on March 22, 1991, two days before WrestleMania VII. Warrior married for the second time to Dana Viale on January 31, 1999. The couple had two daughters together.

=== Legal issues ===
In 1993, Hellwig legally changed his name to the mononym Warrior. This one-word name appears on all legal documents pertaining to Warrior, and his children carry the Warrior name as their legal surname. Warrior and the WWF engaged in a series of lawsuits and legal actions in 1996 and 1998, where both parties sought a declaration that they owned the characters, Warrior and Ultimate Warrior, under both contract and copyright law. The court ruled that Warrior was legally entitled to use the gimmick, costuming, face paint designs, and mannerisms of the "Warrior" character.

On September 27, 2005, WWE released a DVD documentary focusing on Warrior's wrestling career, titled The Self-Destruction of the Ultimate Warrior. The DVD featured clips of his more notable feuds and matches along with commentary from WWE stars past and present (most of which are unflattering), with Triple H (by this point one of WWE's top main eventers and the husband of Vince McMahon's daughter Stephanie McMahon) adding that his WrestleMania debut loss against Warrior at WrestleMania XII left him with mixed emotions, saying that Warrior "ruined the experience" for him and was "one of the most unprofessional guys" he's ever performed with. The DVD provoked some controversy due to Warrior's own allegations of slander by WWE against him. Originally, Warrior was asked to help with the production of the DVD, but as he refused to work with WWE (citing he did not want to be associated with their promotion), there had been some resulting animosity between Warrior and WWE over the Warrior claiming bias on the part of WWE. In January 2006, Warrior filed another lawsuit against WWE in an Arizona court over the depiction of his wrestling career in The Self-Destruction of the Ultimate Warrior DVD. On September 18, 2009, Warrior's lawsuit in Arizona was dismissed.

== Death and legacy ==
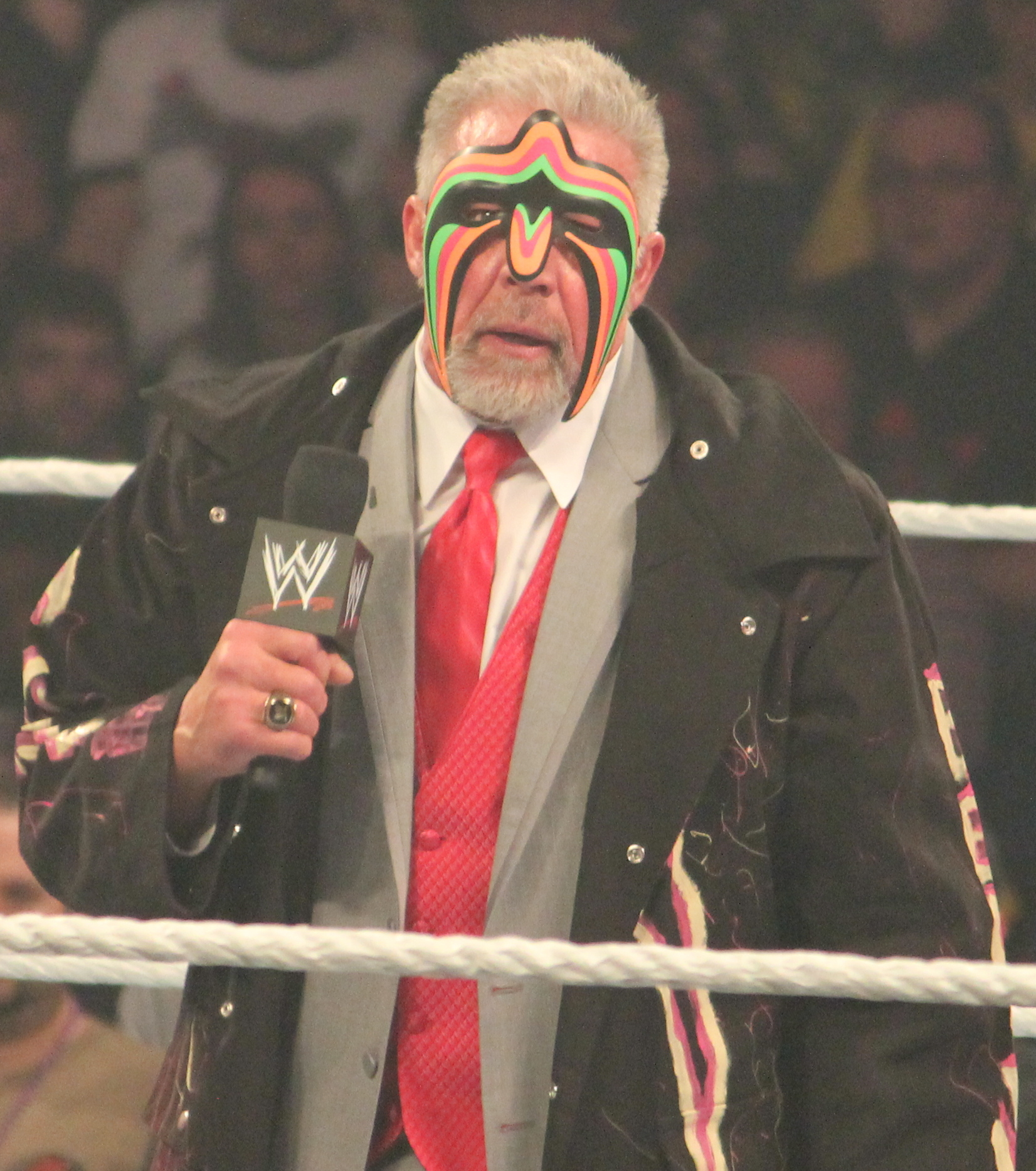
Warrior in a mask depicting his trademark face paint, on what would prove to be his final public appearance (the April 7, 2014 edition of Raw) one day before his death

According to reports, on April 8, 2014, Warrior clutched his chest and collapsed at 5:50 p.m. while walking to his car with his wife outside of their hotel in Arizona. He was rushed to the hospital where he was pronounced dead at the age of 54. Warrior's colleagues said Warrior appeared frail during WrestleMania weekend, and said that he was sweating profusely and breathing heavily backstage.

An autopsy revealed Warrior died of a heart attack. He is buried in West Point Cemetery in West Point, Indiana.

Warrior had been inducted into the WWE Hall of Fame on April 5, appeared at WrestleMania XXX on April 6, and made his first Raw appearance in almost 18 years on April 7, the day before his death. His final line on the program was "You are the Ultimate Warrior fans and the spirit of Ultimate Warrior will run forever."

=== Legacy ===
Although Warrior's relationship with WWE was strained at times, more recently WWE has recognized him as one of the company's most popular legends. WWE described him as being "As devastating and intense as any Superstar who stepped through the ropes...", further saying that "Ultimate Warrior may be the most enigmatic man to ever hold the WWE Championship." In 2011, WWE called him "one of the most recognizable" wrestlers in WWE history, praising his ability to draw power from "the WWE Universe", and further spoke of his impact as having "brought Hulkamania to its knees" at WrestleMania VI, "retired the Madness at WrestleMania VII and press slammed a slew of the greatest legends of his era".

WWE paid tribute to Warrior on the April 14 episode of Raw with a ten bell salute and a video. The WWE Network aired a lineup dubbed "Warrior Week" in Warrior's memory. The lineup included a four-part special. A wrestling themed episode of The Goldbergs, which aired on May 6, was dedicated in Warrior's memory. The 2015 film The Flintstones & WWE: Stone Age SmackDown!, which stars The Flintstones and WWE Superstars and Divas, was dedicated to Warrior's memory.

At the UFC Fight Night 40 weigh-ins, fighter Lorenz Larkin wore an Ultimate Warrior mask, tassels and wristbands as a tribute.

Warrior was awarded a posthumous Slammy Award for Return of the Year in December 2014. The WWE-sponsored biography Ultimate Warrior: A Life Lived Forever: The Legend of a WWE Hero was released in 2015.

In WWE All Stars, in which Ultimate Warrior appears as one of the "Legends", WWE stated that he was the "ultimate archetype of strength and intensity", and further stated that "without question, the Ultimate Warrior has etched his name in the pantheon of WWE greats".

=== Warrior Award; Unleash Your Warrior ===
During his April 2014 Hall of Fame speech shortly before his death, Warrior proposed that the "Jimmy Miranda Award" should be created to honor WWE's behind-the-scenes employees. Miranda, who died in 2002, was part of the WWE merchandise department for more than 20 years.

In 2015, WWE introduced the Warrior Award for those who have "exhibited unwavering strength and perseverance, and who lives life with the courage and compassion that embodies the indomitable spirit of the Ultimate Warrior." Former WWE ring announcer Justin Roberts expressed disappointment at how WWE used portions of Warrior's Hall of Fame speech to promote the award, but left out Warrior's intentions of honoring WWE's off-screen employees. WWE responded, "It is offensive to suggest that WWE and its executives had anything but altruistic intentions in honoring Connor and his legacy with the Warrior Award", adding that "moving forward the award will be given annually to acknowledge other unsung heroes among WWE's employees and fans." As of 2019, Sue Aitchison would be the first WWE employee to be given the warrior award.

In 2017, WWE started promoting the "Unleash Your Warrior" breast cancer awareness campaign in partnership with the Susan G. Komen Foundation, where Warrior's likeness was promoted on television by WWE wrestlers and breast cancer survivors. WWE has been criticized for using Warrior as the inspirational "emblem" of the campaign. Pro Wrestling Torch described Warrior in real-life having made public "vile, bigoted, hateful, judgmental comments about a cancer victim, Hurricane Katrina victims, homosexual people, a woman defending a gay man, and even Martin Luther King Jr." For example, when Bobby Heenan contracted cancer, Warrior said, "Karma is just a beautiful thing to behold." Vice wrote that "completely whitewashing his past and elevating his likeness to a bland symbol of corporate altruism is shockingly tone-deaf, especially for a company that's at least outwardly trying to appear progressive, inclusive and diverse". In response, WWE said that the Unleash Your Warrior campaign and the Warrior Award "recognize individuals that exhibit the strength and courage of WWE's legendary character the Ultimate Warrior. Any attempt to distract from the mission of these initiatives and take the spotlight away from the honorees is unfortunately misguided."

== In media ==
Ultimate Warrior

YouTube information
- Channel: Ultimate Warrior
- Years active: 2012–2022
- Genre: Podcasting
- Subscribers: 46.8 thousand
- Views: 5.5 million
- Last updated: June 28, 2025

Between 1987 and 1989, he appeared in several TV ads for Westway Ford, a car dealership in Irving, Texas. Warrior interacted in full wrestling costume with Westway's wacky character, "Mean Joe Greed."

In 1993, Warrior played the role of "The Swordsman" in the action movie Firepower.

In 1996, Warrior published a comic book titled Warrior, featuring himself as the main character. The series was co-written with Jim Callahan and illustrated by the Sharp Brothers.

Warrior (as "Ultimate Warrior") appeared as a character in the video games WWF Superstars (1989), WWF WrestleMania Challenge (1990), WWF Superstars (1991), WWF WrestleFest (1991), WWF WrestleMania (1991), WWF European Rampage Tour (1992), WWF Super WrestleMania (1992), WWF WrestleMania: Steel Cage Challenge (1992), WWF In Your House (1996), WWE All Stars, WWE Legends of WrestleMania, WWE 2K14, WWE 2K15, WWE 2K16, WWE 2K17, WWE 2K18, WWE 2K19, WWE 2K20, WWE 2K22, WWE 2K23, and WWE 2K24.

In 2005, WWE released a DVD titled The Self-Destruction of the Ultimate Warrior, which portrayed Warrior in a negative light. Warrior claimed that if WWE wanted to induct him into the WWE Hall of Fame they would have "to tell the right story" opposite of the one depicted in the 2005 DVD. WWE released Ultimate Warrior: the Ultimate Collection, a 3-DVD, 540 minute-compilation of matches and stories, which portrayed Warrior far more positively, on April 1, 2014.

Warrior maintained a blog on his personal website titled "Warrior's Machete", where he discussed his personal life, his personal views on politics, sexuality, patriotism, and his legacy as a wrestler, amongst other topics. There were numerous instances where Warrior used his blog to address his viewpoint on members of his wrestling past (Vince McMahon, Road Warrior Animal, The British Bulldog, Owen Hart, Hulk Hogan, Lex Luger); Warrior depicted celebrities who were newsworthy at the time of his blog (Heath Ledger and Paris Hilton). Warrior occasionally referenced his respect for the Founding Fathers of the United States, and also enjoyed books like Homer's Odyssey and James Allen's As a Man Thinketh. In 2012, he started selling "Weapons of Wisdom", inspirational 6×9 pieces of watercolor paper with drawings, quotes, and doodles on them by the Warrior himself. He also used the blog to post replies to letters from fans.

In 2021, Warrior's life was chronicled on A&E's Biography: WWE Legends and Viceland's Dark Side of the Ring.

Warrior appeared in the Mattel Legends action figures line in both Series 4 and Series 6. He was also chosen as one of six legends to be included in the Defining Moments series of action figures. Subsequently, he was one of a number of figures in the WWE Superstars line of Mattel action figures in an assortment called "World Champions".

== Championships and accomplishments ==
Ultimate Warrior as WWF Intercontinental Champion, c. 1988

- Nu-Wrestling Evolution
  - NWE World Heavyweight Championship (1 time)
- Pro Wrestling Illustrated
  - Comeback of the Year (1992)
  - Feud of the Year (1991) vs. The Undertaker
  - Match of the Year (1990) vs. Hulk Hogan at WrestleMania VI
  - Ranked No. 9 of the top 500 singles wrestlers in the PWI 500 in 1992
  - Ranked. 101 of the top 500 singles wrestlers of the "PWI Years" in 2003
- World Class Wrestling Association
  - WCWA Texas Heavyweight Championship (1 time)
  - WCWA World Tag Team Championship (1 time) – with Lance Von Erich
- World Wrestling Federation/WWE
  - WWF Championship (1 time)
  - WWF Intercontinental Championship (2 times)
  - WWE Hall of Fame (Class of 2014)
  - WWE Bronze Statue (2015)
  - Slammy Award (1 time)
    - Surprise Return of the Year (2014)
- Wrestling Observer Newsletter
  - Most Embarrassing Wrestler (1998)
  - Most Overrated (1989–1991)
  - Readers' Least Favorite Wrestler (1989–1990)
  - Worst Feud of the Year (1989) vs. André the Giant
  - Worst Feud of the Year (1992) vs. Papa Shango
  - Worst Feud of the Year (1998) vs. Hulk Hogan
  - Worst on Interviews (1989–1992, 1998)
  - Worst Worked Match of the Year (1989) vs. André the Giant on October 31
  - Worst Worked Match of the Year (1998) vs. Hulk Hogan at Halloween Havoc
  - Worst Wrestler (1988, 1998)

== Bibliography ==
- Warrior (1996). "Issue 1". Warrior Comic. ISSN 1521-4875.

== See also ==
- List of premature professional wrestling deaths – People associated with professional wrestling who died before age 65
