= In Your House 8: Beware of Dog =

1996 World Wrestling Federation pay-per-view event

- Promotional poster featuring Vader
- Promotion: World Wrestling Federation
- Date: May 26, 1996; May 28, 1996
- City: Florence, South Carolina; North Charleston, South Carolina
- Venue: Florence Civic Center (May 26); North Charleston Coliseum (May 28)
- Attendance: 6,000 (Florence); 4,500 (North Charleston)
- Buy rate: 117,000
- Tagline: It's Vader Time

Pay-per-view chronology
← Previous; In Your House 7	Next → King of the Ring

In Your House chronology
← Previous; Good Friends, Better Enemies	Next → International Incident

In Your House 8: Beware of Dog was a 1996 professional wrestling pay-per-view (PPV) event produced by the World Wrestling Federation (WWF, renamed WWE in 2002). It was the eighth In Your House and was originally scheduled to only take place on Sunday, May 26, 1996, from the Florence Civic Center in Florence, South Carolina, but a second night of the event also took place on Tuesday, May 28, 1996, at the North Charleston Coliseum in North Charleston, South Carolina. The name of the show was based on the rivalry between Shawn Michaels and The British Bulldog.

Due to a severe thunderstorm, the power went out during the broadcast on May 26, resulting in only two matches being shown on pay-per-view and a series of matches where the building had very little power. As a result, a second night titled "Beware of Dog 2" was scheduled for May 28. The two matches televised from the May 26 broadcast were shown again at the beginning of the rescheduled pay-per-view. The event was available to stream on the WWE Network as one singular event. To date, this is the promotion's only pay-per-view event to be held in South Carolina.

The match between Shawn Michaels and The British Bulldog was the originally scheduled main event, which ended in a draw as both wrestlers were pinned simultaneously, resulting in Michaels retaining the WWF Championship. This was one of the two matches that was shown during the original broadcast on May 26. This event marked the end and disbanding of the Million Dollar Corporation with Ted DiBiase leaving for rival company World Championship Wrestling and joining its New World Order stable.

== Background ==
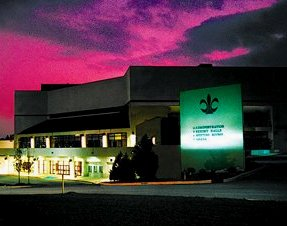
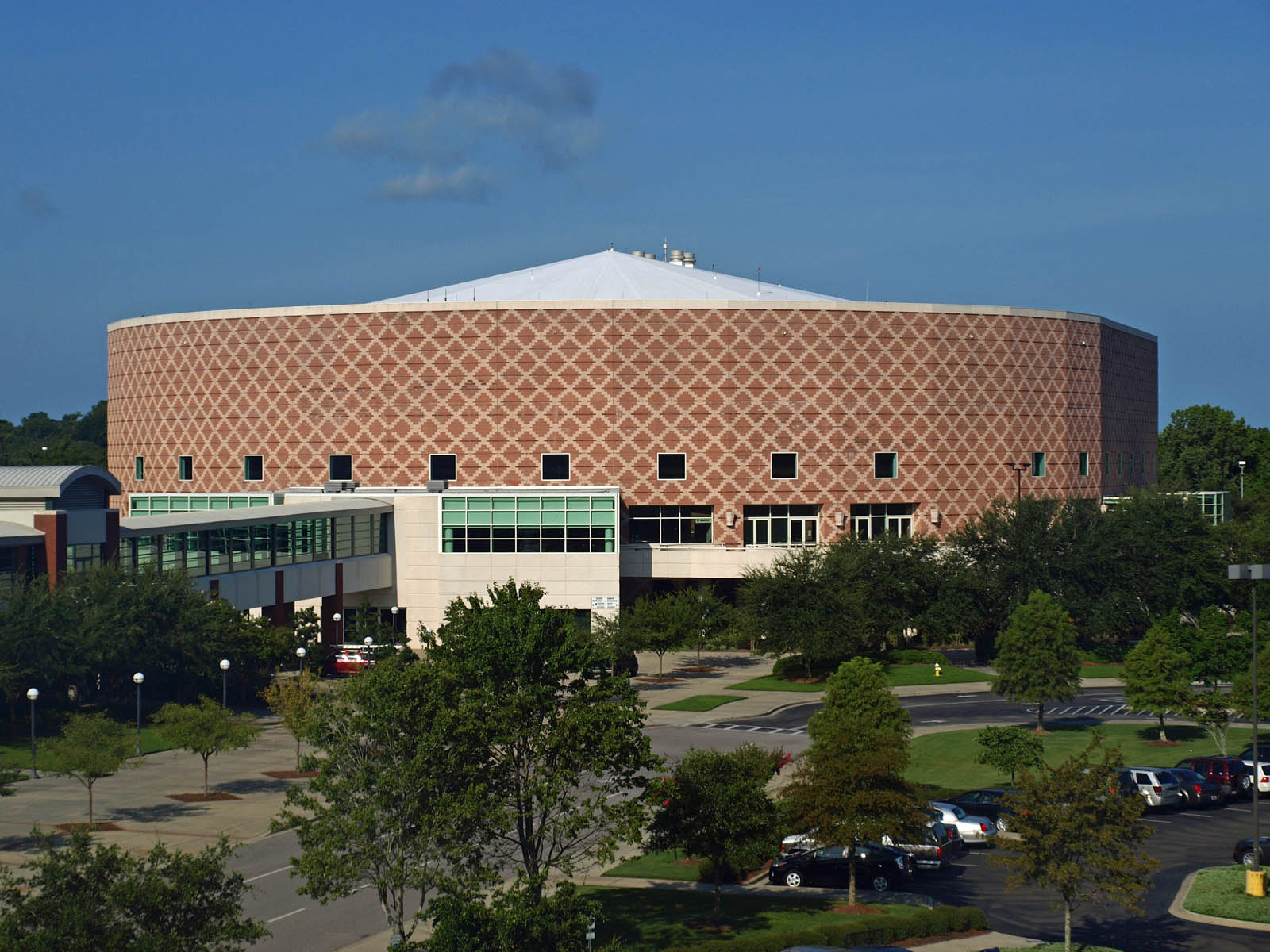
The eighth In Your House was originally scheduled to only take place at the Florence Civic Center in Florence, South Carolina (top) on May 26, but due to a severe thunderstorm that disrupted the majority of the pay-per-view broadcast with only two matches being shown, a second night was held two days later on May 28 at the North Charleston Coliseum in North Charleston, South Carolina (bottom).

In Your House was a series of monthly professional wrestling pay-per-view (PPV) events first produced by the World Wrestling Federation (WWF, renamed WWE in 2002) in May 1995. They aired when the promotion was not holding one of its then-five major PPVs (WrestleMania, King of the Ring, SummerSlam, Survivor Series, and Royal Rumble) and were sold at a lower cost. In Your House 8: Beware of Dog was originally scheduled to only take place on Sunday, May 26, 1996, from the Florence Civic Center in Florence, South Carolina. The name of the show was based on the rivalry between Shawn Michaels and The British Bulldog.

Due to a severe thunderstorm, the power went out during the event, resulting in only two matches being shown on pay-per-view and a series of dark matches not aired on television. The televised event was rescheduled as "Beware of Dog 2" and took place on Tuesday, May 28, 1996, at the North Charleston Coliseum in North Charleston, South Carolina after a scheduled taping of the WWF's syndicated Superstars of Wrestling program. The two matches televised from the May 26 event were shown again at the beginning of the rescheduled pay-per-view.

== Event ==
=== May 26 ===
Before the event aired live on pay-per-view, a match for the WWF Tag Team Championship between the challengers, The Smoking Gunns (Bart Gunn and Billy Gunn), and the champions, The Godwinns (Henry O. Godwinn and Phineas I. Godwinn), was broadcast live on Free for All. The Godwinns were accompanied by Hillbilly Jim and Sunny. Several minutes into the match, Sunny appeared on the ring apron and approached Billy Gunn while Phineas and Bart wrestled inside the ring. Billy then grabbed Sunny and kissed her, causing Phineas to become distracted which allowed Bart to perform a German suplex and make the pinfall to win the WWF Tag Team Championship.

Other on-screen personnel (May 26)
Role:	Name:
Commentator	Vince McMahon
Commentator	Jerry Lawler
Interviewer	Dok Hendrix
Interviewer	Mr. Perfect
Ring announcer	Howard Finkel
Referee	Jack Doan
Referee	Tim White
Referee	Earl Hebner
Referee	Mike Chioda

The first match to air live on pay-per-view was a standard match between "Wildman" Marc Mero (with Sable) and Hunter Hearst Helmsley. Helmsley attempted to perform his finishing move, the Pedigree, when Mero countered by grabbing Helmsley's legs out from under him and performed a slingshot catapult, sending Helmsley head-first into the top of the ring post. Mero covered a "knocked-out" Helmsley for the pinfall.

The next scheduled match was a Caribbean Strap match between Steve Austin and Savio Vega but the power to the arena and WWF satellite television trucks went out and the pay-per-view feed cut out due to a severe thunderstorm. This match, along with the other scheduled matches, still took place but with little light in the arena and not broadcast on pay-per-view. The power and feed were restored for many areas just before the ring entrances for the main event match, but for some areas the feed was never restored and for those areas, Mero against Helmsley turned out to be the first and the final match on PPV feed.

The main event of the night featured WWF Champion Shawn Michaels defending the title against the British Bulldog. Just before the match began, as scripted, Michaels was served a summons from Bulldog's storyline attorney Clarence Mason. It stated that Michaels was a defendant with the charge of "attempted alienation of affection" due to the allegation of him making advances towards Bulldog's wife (storyline and real life) Diana Smith, therefore causing strain in their marriage. The timing of the subpoena by Bulldog's camp was an attempt to throw Michaels off his game, giving Bulldog a better chance of winning the championship. During the match, as part of the script, Bulldog accidentally ran into referee Earl Hebner, knocking him out for a period of time. A replacement referee (Mike Chioda) continued the match. Shawn Michaels performed a German suplex into a pinfall combination on Bulldog. By this time, the original referee had regained his senses, and both referees counted the pinfall. Both wrestlers had their shoulders on the mat as Chioda counted Michaels' shoulders down, while Hebner counted Bulldog's down. Due to both wrestlers being pinned simultaneously, the match was ruled a draw and Michaels retained the WWF Championship.

The WWE Network version of the event jumps to this match after the opening match, after which the second part of the show streams. None of the matches that took place in the dark are included.

=== May 28 ===
Other on-screen personnel (May 28)
Role:	Name:
Commentator	Jim Ross
Commentator	Mr. Perfect
Ring announcer	Bill Dunn
Referee	Tim White
Referee	Mike Chioda
Referee	Jack Doan

The second half of Beware of Dog was held live on Tuesday, May 28, 1996 after a scheduled taping of WWF Superstars at the North Charleston Coliseum. The event was held a day after a Raw event at the Cumberland County Civic Center a day after, and entitled "Beware of Dog 2". The broadcast began by re-airing the two matches shown on pay-per-view from May 26 (Mero/Helmsley and Bulldog/Michaels) while Superstars taping was ongoing. The first match that aired live on May 28 was a Caribbean Strap match between Steve Austin (with Ted DiBiase) and Savio Vega. The previous night on Raw (May 27), Ted DiBiase announced that if Austin did not defeat Vega, DiBiase would leave the WWF. The match was back and forth until Austin wrapped a portion of the strap around Vega's neck and began to drag him around the ring with the strap over his shoulder. Austin started the process of touching all four corners to win the match, but Vega also touched the corners (without Austin's knowledge) as he was being tugged. After Austin and Vega touched the third corner, Vega put up enough fight to force Austin to turn around. The two were now facing each other and Austin pulled on the strap, attempting to touch the last corner, but instead pulled with enough strength that Vega flew into the corner causing Austin to lose the match and DiBiase to leave the WWF. After the match, Vega led the audience in "Na Na Hey Hey Kiss Him Goodbye" by Steam, directed at DiBiase.

The following match was a standard match featuring Vader (with Jim Cornette) versus Yokozuna. It began with Vader reluctant to engage with his opponent until Yokozuna gained control for most of the match. Eventually, Yokozuna became occupied with Cornette and attempted to perform his finishing move, the Banzai Drop, on him when Vader pulled Cornette out of the way. Yokozuna missed his target which provided Vader the opportunity to deliver an elbow drop to the leg, followed by a Vader Bomb allowing him to make the pinfall.

The next, and last match of the event was a casket match for the WWF Intercontinental Championship between the champion, Goldust (with Marlena), and the challenger, The Undertaker (with Paul Bearer). During the match, Undertaker performed his signature Tombstone piledriver to Goldust and went to roll him into the casket. However, when Undertaker opened the casket, Mankind appeared inside and locked-in his Mandible Claw hold, positioned Undertaker into the casket and shut the lid, which resulted in Goldust winning the match and retaining the Intercontinental Championship. After the match, Mankind sat on top of the casket until it suddenly started to smoke. Mankind retreated to the locker room while Paul Bearer and WWF officials tried to open the casket. When it eventually opened, the Undertaker was gone. The arena lights darkened and Undertaker's entrance theme began to play as the pay-per-view signed off the air.

The WWE Network version of the show picks up right after the Shawn Michaels/British Bulldog match with the Tuesday make-up show.

== Reception ==
The WWF earned $63,435 in ticket sales from the May 26 event with an attendance of 6,000. The pay-per-view received a buyrate of 0.45, the equivalent of approximately 100,000 buys. The event was released on VHS in the United States on August 6, 1996, by Coliseum Video.

== Results ==
=== May 26 ===
No.	Results	Stipulations	Times
1^{F}	The Smoking Gunns (Billy Gunn and Bart Gunn) defeated The Godwinns (Henry O. Godwinn and Phineas I. Godwinn) (c) (with Sunny)	Tag team match for the WWF Tag Team Championship	4:57
2^{D}	Bob Holly defeated Isaac Yankem, DDS	Singles match	7:35
3	Marc Mero (with Sable) defeated Hunter Hearst Helmsley	Singles match	16:23
4^{D}	Savio Vega defeated "Stone Cold" Steve Austin (with Ted DiBiase)	Caribbean Strap match	15:00
5^{D}	Vader (with Jim Cornette) defeated Yokozuna	Singles match	3:00
6^{D}	Goldust (c) (with Marlena) defeated The Undertaker (with Paul Bearer) by putting Undertaker in the casket with the lid completely shut	Casket match for the WWF Intercontinental Championship	8:00
7^{D}	Jake Roberts defeated Justin Bradshaw (with Uncle Zebekiah)	Singles match	0:30
8	Shawn Michaels (c) (with José Lothario) vs. The British Bulldog (with Diana Smith, Owen Hart, and Clarence Mason) ended in a no contest	Singles match for the WWF Championship	17:21
9^{D}	Ahmed Johnson defeated Jerry Lawler	Singles match	7:00
10^{D}	Ultimate Warrior defeated Owen Hart	Singles match	4:00
(c) / – the champion(s) heading into the match; F / – the match was broadcast prior to the pay-per-view on Free for All; D / – this was a dark match

=== May 28: "Beware of Dog 2" ===
This was also a Superstars of Wrestling television taping.

No.	Results	Stipulations	Times
1	Savio Vega defeated "Stone Cold" Steve Austin (with Ted DiBiase)	Caribbean Strap match Since Vega won, DiBiase was forced to leave the WWF. Had Austin won, Vega would have had to become DiBiase's chauffeur.	21:27
2	Vader (with Jim Cornette) defeated Yokozuna	Singles match	8:53
3	Goldust (c) (with Marlena) defeated The Undertaker (with Paul Bearer) by putting Undertaker in the casket with the lid completely shut	Casket match for the WWF Intercontinental Championship	12:36
4^{D}	Hunter Hearst Helmsley defeated Marc Mero	Singles match	12:37
(c) / – the champion(s) heading into the match; D / – this was a dark match
