= Rick Bassman =

American entrepreneur, producer, author

- Bassman (left) at the Korakuen Hall with Shinya Hashimoto in 2004
- Born: Richard David Bassman; November 20, 1961 (age 64); Northridge, Los Angeles, U.S.
- Education: Chaminade College Preparatory School; University of California at Santa Barbara (dropped)
- Occupations: Wrestler, author, producer

Richard David Bassman (born November 20, 1961) is an American entrepreneur, producer, talent agent, and author.

== Early life ==
Rick Bassman was born in Northridge, California to Jewish parents. Bassman's mother, Felice, died when he was 13 years old. He attended Chaminade College Preparatory School, in Chatsworth, California. At age 16, Bassman was diagnosed with Stage 4 testicular cancer, which metastasized to both lungs, undergoing chemotherapy and surgeries from ages 16–19. He attended the University of California at Santa Barbara for one quarter, prior to dropping out to start his first business.

== Career ==
Bassman began his career in Santa Barbara, CA, forming Bassman Productions, which contained verticals within the music including ownership of The Library Restaurant & Nightclub in the Santa Barbara college town of Isla Vista, Bassman Event Security, which provided security guard services on an exclusive basis for UCSB and Cal Poly San Luis Obispo, and Bassman Productions Events, which presented concerts with the Go-Go's, the Clash, the B-52s, Talking Heads and many others.

In 1985, Bassman moved to Denver, Colorado, where he went to work for the Vannoy Talent Agency, then the state's leading talent agency. Shortly thereafter, Vannoy closed its doors and Bassman formed Celebrity Services, to provide representation to the region's leading professional and Olympics athletes. Representing many players on the Denver Broncos, Denver Nuggets, Arizona Cardinals and Phoenix Suns franchises, Bassman created and managed NFL/Denver Broncos' marketing sensation "The Three Amigos," consisting of wide receivers Vance Johnson, Mark Jackson and Ricky Nattiel.

A Former Disney executive, Bassman won an Emmy while at Disney for his work writing and producing Disney's the CBS Special, Flash Back. Bassman also formed and was Division Head of the "Larger Than Life" Division of industry-leader CESD Talent Agency, representing Lou Ferrigno, Tito Ortiz, and Roddy Piper, among many others. He is probably best known for his work in Mixed Martial Arts, in which he owned and operated Valor Fighting, managed many of the world's top Heavyweights, including Mark Coleman, Mark Kerr, Oleg Taktarov, Butterbean and Tank Abbott and consulted for industry leader K-1, and in Professional Wrestling, where he founded, owned and operated Ultimate Pro Wrestling ("UPW"), consulted for industry leader World Wrestling Entertainment, and discovered, trained and managed many top stars, such as Sting, The Ultimate Warrior, John Cena, The Miz, Chris Masters, Luther Reigns, Nathan Jones, and Jon Heidenreich.

Bassman is currently co-founder and partner in the Global Pro Wrestling Mission, which stages pro wrestling events in third world countries for the benefit of non-profits in those countries; and heads North American Business Development for MOOZ Entertainment, India's leading promoter, travelling there frequently and most recently with American rock bands Korn and Guns N' Roses.

Bassman was scheduled to release his autobiography, "Been There, Done That," in 2013, after turning down a deal with leading publisher Simon & Schuster, and successfully raising funds through Kickstarter to self-publish. In July 2013, Bassman underwent a series of epidural injections to relieve chronic pain resulting from his years of involvement in the Mixed Martial Arts and Professional Wrestling professions. The injections, improperly administered, led to three major back surgeries within a three months' period of time, followed by a series of life-threatening infections.

== Personal life ==
With a background in competitive Tae Kwan Do and Amateur Wrestling, Bassman occasionally competed as an in-ring performer, including a stint as the UPW Lightweight champion and a headline match at Tokyo's Korakuen Hall against the legendary Shinya Hashimoto for leading Japanese Pro Wrestling Company, Zero-One. Bassman headlined UPW's 5th Anniversary Show at The Grove of Anaheim, defeating Pete Doyle for control of the company. Ken Shamrock, Ivory, Superfly Jimmy Snuka, Christopher Daniels, Frankie Kazarian, Scott Hall and Kevin Nash all wrestled on this show.

Bassman had previously worked in professional wrestling as manager Rick Golden for the Universal Wrestling Federation in 1991.

Bassman is active in advocacy of the bully breeds and after an 18-month stint in Big Bear City, California, where he moved to write his autobiography, now lives in San Clemente, California, with his Staffordshire Terriers, Ramone and GoGo.
