= 2nd Von Erich Memorial Parade of Champions =

- Little John standing in the ring prior to the Fantastics vs. Midnight Express match
- Promotion: World Class Championship Wrestling
- Date: May 5, 1985
- City: Irving, Texas
- Venue: Texas Stadium
- Attendance: 26,153

Event chronology
← Previous; Wrestling Star Wars	Next → Independence Day Star Wars

Parade of Champions chronology
← Previous; 1984	Next → 1986

The 2nd Von Erich Memorial Parade of Champions was a major professional wrestling event produced by World Class Championship Wrestling (WCCW) on May 5, 1985 at the Texas Stadium in Irving, Texas. The event was held by WCCW promoter Fritz Von Erich in memory of his son David Von Erich, who died in February 1984. It was the second memorial event for David Von Erich and the seventh event in the Parade of Champions chronology.

Nine professional wrestling matches were contested at the card. The main event pitted Kerry Von Erich against One Man Gang. The match stipulated that if Von Erich won, Gang's manager Gary Hart would have his head shaved bald, but if Kerry lost, his father Fritz Von Erich would have to come out of retirement and face One Man Gang one-on-one. Kerry won the match and as a result, Hart's head was shaved bald. Another major match at the event featured Ric Flair defending the NWA World Heavyweight Championship against Kevin Von Erich. The match ended in a double count-out, meaning Flair retained the title.

In an other prominent match on the card, The Von Erichs (Kerry Von Erich, Kevin Von Erich and Mike Von Erich) and Fabulous Freebirds (Michael Hayes, Terry Gordy and Buddy Roberts) defeat The Dynamic Duo (Chris Adams and Gino Hernandez), Rip Oliver, One Man Gang, Kamala and "Dr. Death" Steve Williams in a twelve-man tag team match, where the winning team would split $100,000 and the wrestler who eliminated the last wrestler won a brand new Lincoln Continental. Kevin Von Erich scored the win by pinning Steve Williams. Also at the event, The Fantastics (Bobby Fulton and Tommy Rogers) controversially defeated The Midnight Express (Bobby Eaton and Dennis Condrey) (with Jim Cornette) in a two-ring no disqualification match to win the vacant NWA American Tag Team Championship.

== Event ==
=== Preliminary matches ===
In the opening match of the event, Johnny Mantell took on Skip Young. The match ended in a draw.

Next, Scott Casey and Brian Adias took on the team of Kelly and Nick Kiniski. Casey and Adias won the match.

It was followed by a match between Terry Gordy and Kamala the Ugandan Giant. Gordy won the match via a disqualification.

Next, Mike Von Erich took on Rip Oliver. Despite Jim Cornette's interference in the match on Oliver's behalf, Von Erich hit Oliver with a cast and pinned him for the win.

In the following match, The Great Kabuki and Hercules Hernandez were supposed to take on The Dynamic Duo (Gino Hernandez and Chris Adams). However, Hernandez left WCCW immediately before the event, and was replaced by Scott Casey. Adams pinned Casey for the win. After that, Dynamic Duo forcefully brought Sunshine into the ring but Kabuki made the save by spraying green mist to Hernandez.

Later, The Fantastics (Bobby Fulton and Tommy Rogers) took on The Midnight Express (Bobby Eaton and Dennis Condrey) in a two-ring no disqualification match for the vacant NWA American Tag Team Championship. Jim Cornette was handcuffed to Fantastics' bodyguard Little John. The match took place in two rings and was officiated by two referees. John tried to break up a choke by Eaton on Rogers, which allowed Cornette to hit Fulton with a tennis racket. Condrey subsequently pinned Fulton and Midnight Express apparently won the match. However, Rogers had pinned Eaton with a roll-up in the other ring. The referee Rick Hazzard initially awarded the win to Condrey but both referees argued over the conclusion and eventually settled by declaring Fantastics, the winners, due to outside interference by Cornette. This made Fantastics, the new American Tag Team Champions.

=== Twelve-man five falls match ===
Next, a Two-ring twelve-man five falls match occurred, pitting The Von Erichs (Kerry Von Erich, Kevin Von Erich and Mike Von Erich) and Fabulous Freebirds (Michael Hayes, Terry Gordy and Buddy Roberts) against The Dynamic Duo, Rip Oliver, One Man Gang, Kamala and "Dr. Death" Steve Williams. It was a three out of five falls match, where the team that scored the first three falls would be declared the winner and the team would split $100,000, and the person who scored the winning fall would win a brand new Lincoln Continental.

Kerry tried to pin Hernandez with a roll-up but Adams delivered a superkick to Kerry, allowing Hernandez to pin him for the first fall. Dynamic Duo knocked out Hayes with a double clothesline and Hernandez pinned him for the second fall. As a result, Dynamic Duo's team got 0-2 score in the match. Kerry delivered a crossbody to Oliver to win the third fall, taking the score to 1-2. Fabulous Freebirds triple teamed Hernandez and Von Erichs triple teamed Oliver. It resulted in Roberts pinning Hernandez to win the fourth fall, and tying the match score to 2-2. Kevin scored the final fall for his team by diving off the ropes from the first ring to the second ring onto Williams and pinning him for the win with a 3-2 lead. As a result, Von Erichs and Fabulous Freebirds won $100,000 and Kevin was awarded with the Lincoln Continental.

However, One Man Gang's manager Gary Hart ordered him to destroy the car with his chain but Mike Von Erich and the referee David Manning prevented him from destroying the car and sent him backstage. Gino Hernandez eventually succeeded in stealing the chain from Manning and destroying the car's windshield with it. Chris Adams proceeded to kick the glass to cause further damage.

=== NWA World Championship match ===
It was followed by the penultimate match, in which Ric Flair defended the NWA World Heavyweight Championship against Kevin Von Erich. Flair and Von Erich both fell from the ring to the floor while Von Erich had applied the Iron Claw on Flair. They brawled with each other outside the ring and the referee counted both of them out. As a result, Flair retained the title. Flair continued to attack Von Erich after the match but Von Erich applied an Iron Claw in rage and almost knocked him unconscious until his father Fritz Von Erich intervened.

=== Main event match ===
In the main event, Kerry Von Erich took on One Man Gang. The match stipulated that if Kerry won, Gang's manager Gary Hart would be shaved bald but if Gang won, Kerry's father Fritz Von Erich would be forced to come out of retirement and face Gang in a one-on-one match. Fritz tripped Gang from the ropes as Gang was about to deliver a 747 Splash to Kerry. Kerry eventually pinned Gang for the win. As a result, Hart's head had to be shaved bald. Kevin Von Erich and a couple of wrestlers succeeded in handcuffing Gang to the ropes and Fritz shaved Hart's head bald.

== Reception ==
Parade of Champions received positive to mixed reviews from critics. According to Gary of Blog of Doom, "From the world title match to the 12-man best of five match to the tag team title match, this show completely overshadowed last year’s event. While nothing truly historical occurred, I recommend this show without any reservations." He praised the American Tag Team Championship match as a "Great match with an intriguing finish" and Ric Flair vs. Kevin Von Erich as "an incredible roller coaster ride". According to him, the twelve-man tag team match was a "Chaotic match that was action-packed" and the match between Dynamic Duo and the team of Great Kabuki and Scott Kasey was a "pretty good tag match".

Arnold Furious had mixed reviews for "WCCW getting creative with the two rings, various wacky stipulations and booking that inspired some Jim Crockett stuff down the line." He stated that "the lack of top tier babyfaces" was "a massive issue", as "all the Von Erich kids work twice, even Mike. Apart from the tag titles match everything has a Von Erich attached." According to him, the card had "an excellent NWA title match" and the WCCW events of that era were "a good watch". He felt the WCCW events were enjoyable "even with the reliance on the Von Erich brothers." Despite the praise, he cited the event as a sign of decline for WCCW as "(Ric) Flair would only come back here one more time" and he felt that Kevin's failure to win the title at the event was "the beginning of the end" for the promotion.

== Aftermath ==
The rivalry between The Fantastics and The Midnight Express continued after the event as Fantastics defeated Midnight Express in a rematch to retain the American Tag Team Championship on May 21.

Kerry Von Erich and One Man Gang continued their rivalry as Von Erich defeated One Man Gang in a Chicago Deathmatch at Independence Day Star Wars.

Dynamic Duo would continue their feuds with Von Erichs and The Great Kabuki after the event. At Independence Day Star Wars, Kabuki defeated Chris Adams, while in the main event, Dynamic Duo defeated The Cosmic Cowboys (Kevin Von Erich and Kerry Von Erich).

Kevin Von Erich received his rematch against Ric Flair for the NWA World Heavyweight Championship on May 12 at a National Wrestling Alliance (NWA) event in St. Louis, Missouri, which Flair won to retain the title.

== Results ==
No.	Results	Stipulations	Times
1	Johnny Mantell vs. Skip Young ended in a draw	Singles match	—
2	Scott Casey and Brian Adias defeated Kelly and Nick Kiniski	Tag team match	—
3	Terry Gordy defeated Kamala the Ugandan Giant by disqualification	Singles match	—
4	Mike Von Erich defeated Rip Oliver	Singles match	8:53
5	The Dynamic Duo (Gino Hernandez and Chris Adams) defeated The Great Kabuki and Scott Casey (with Sunshine)	Tag team match	8:19
6	The Fantastics (Bobby Fulton and Tommy Rogers) defeated The Midnight Express (Bobby Eaton and Dennis Condrey) (with Jim Cornette)	Two-ring no disqualification match for the vacant NWA American Tag Team Championship	8:35
7	The Von Erichs (Kerry Von Erich, Kevin Von Erich and Mike Von Erich) and Fabulous Freebirds (Michael Hayes, Terry Gordy and Buddy Roberts) defeated The Dynamic Duo (Chris Adams and Gino Hernandez), Rip Oliver, One Man Gang, Kamala and "Dr. Death" Steve Williams (with Skandor Akbar and Gary Hart) (3:2)	Two-ring twelve-man three out of five falls match	18:43
8	Ric Flair (c) vs. Kevin Von Erich ended in a double count-out	Singles match for the NWA World Heavyweight Championship	22:00
9	Kerry Von Erich (with Fritz Von Erich) defeated One Man Gang (with Gary Hart)	Singles match (Gary Hart's hair vs. One Man Gang facing Fritz Von Erich stipulation)	8:15
(c) / – the champion(s) heading into the match

== See also ==
- 1985 in professional wrestling
