= 1984 in professional wrestling =

1984 in professional wrestling describes the year's events in the world of professional wrestling.

== List of notable promotions ==
These promotions held notable events in 1984.

Promotion Name	Abbreviation
Championship Wrestling from Florida	CWF
Empresa Mexicana de Lucha Libre	EMLL
Jim Crockett Promotions	JCP
Universal Wrestling Association	UWA
World Class Championship Wrestling	WCCW
World Wrestling Council	WWC
World Wrestling Federation	WWF

== Calendar of notable shows ==
Date	Promotion(s)	Event	Location	Main Event
January 23	WWF	The Birth of Hulkamania	New York, New York	Hulk Hogan defeated Iron Sheik (c) in a singles match for the WWF World Heavyweight Championship
January 29	UWA	UWA 9th Anniversary Show	Naucalpan, Mexico	El Canek (c) defeated André the Giant in a singles match for the UWA World Heavyweight Championship
April 8	EMLL	28. Aniversario de Arena México	Mexico City, Mexico	Super Halcón defeated Pirata Morgan in a best two-out-of-three falls Lucha de Apuestas hair vs. hair match
May 6	WCCW	1st Von Erich Memorial Parade of Champions	Irving, Texas	Kerry Von Erich defeated Ric Flair (c) in a singles match for the NWA World Heavyweight Championship
June 30	CWF	Lords of the Ring	Miami, Florida	Dusty Rhodes defeated Ric Flair (c) by disqualification in a 2-out-of-3 Falls Match for the NWA World Heavyweight Championship
July 23	WWF	The Brawl to End It All	New York, New York	Hulk Hogan (c) defeated Greg Valentine in a singles match for the WWF World Heavyweight Championship; Wendi Richter defeated The Fabulous Moolah (c) in a singles match for the WWF Women's Championship
September 14	WWC	WWC 11th Aniversario	San Juan, Puerto Rico	Abdullah the Butcher and Carlos Colón wrestled Stan Hansen and Bruiser Brody to a double disqualification
September 21	EMLL	EMLL 51st Anniversary Show	Mexico City, Mexico	Atlantis defeated Talisman in a best two-out-of-three falls Lucha de Apuestas mask vs. mask match
October 27	WCCW	1st Cotton Bowl Extravaganza	Dallas, Texas	The Dynamic Duo (Chris Adams and Gino Hernandez) and Jake Roberts defeated Bobby Fulton, Kerry Von Erich and Mike Von Erich (c) in a six-man tag team match for the NWA Six-Man Tag Team Championship
November 22	JCP	Starrcade	Greensboro, North Carolina	Ric Flair (c) defeated Dusty Rhodes by referee stoppage in a singles match for the NWA World Heavyweight Championship with Joe Frazier as special guest referee
December 7	EMLL	Juicio Final	Mexico City, Mexico	Máscara Año 2000 defeated Gran Coloso in a Lucha de Apuestas, mask vs. mask match
(c) – denotes defending champion(s)

== Notable events ==
- Championship Wrestling magazine hit the newsstands with its first issue
- January 23: Hulk Hogan defeats The Iron Sheik to win the WWF World Heavyweight Championship at Madison Square Garden, New York, NY
- February 11: After many months of waiting, Tito Santana finally beat Don Muraco to become the first Mexican-American wrestler to win the WWF Intercontinental Championship at Boston Garden.
- May 29: Tuesday Night Titans premiered on the USA Network
- July 14: Black Saturday (professional wrestling)
- July 23: Wendi Richter became the New WWF Women's Champion ending the Fabulous Moolah's 28-year reign as champion at New York's Madison Square Garden.
- September 18: Pro Wrestling USA debuted with a inguinal TV taping at the Mid South Coliseum in Memphis, Tennessee
- September 24: At London, Ontario Canada, Greg Valentine pinned Tito Santana to win the WWF Intercontinental Championship. That match would later be seen on WWF All-Star Wrestling.
- December 28: John Stossel while doing a story for 20/20 on the validity of pro wrestling is attacked by David Schultz.

== Accomplishments and tournaments ==
=== AJW ===
Accomplishment	Winner	Date won	Notes
Rookie of the Year Decision Tournament	Mika Komatsu		

=== JCP ===
Accomplishment	Winner	Date won	Notes
NWA United States Championship Tournament	Wahoo McDaniel	October 7	

=== NJPW ===
Accomplishment	Winner	Date won	Notes
G1 Climax	Antonio Inoki	June 14	no final round

== Awards and honors ==
=== Pro Wrestling Illustrated ===
Category	Winner
PWI Wrestler of the Year	Ric Flair
PWI Tag Team of the Year	The Road Warriors (Hawk and Animal)
PWI Match of the Year	Ric Flair vs. Kerry Von Erich (David Von Erich Memorial Parade of Champions)
PWI Most Popular Wrestler of the Year	Kerry Von Erich
PWI Most Hated Wrestler of the Year	Roddy Piper
PWI Most Improved Wrestler of the Year	Billy Jack Haynes
PWI Most Inspirational Wrestler of the Year	Sgt. Slaughter
PWI Rookie of the Year	Mike Von Erich
PWI Manager of the Year	Paul Ellering
PWI Editor's Award	David Von Erich

=== Wrestling Observer Newsletter ===
Category	Winner
Wrestler of the Year	Ric Flair
Feud of the Year	The Freebirds vs. The Von Erichs
Tag Team of the Year	The Road Warriors (Hawk and Animal)
Most Improved	The Cobra
Best on Interviews	Jimmy Hart

== Births ==
- Date of birth uncertain:
  - Grizzly Redwood
- January 1 – James Stephanie Sterling
- January 21 – Alex Koslov
- January 25 – Jay Briscoe (died in 2023)
- January 26 – JD Drake
- January 30 – Junior dos Santos
- January 31 – Knuckles Madsen (died in 2025)
- February 2 – Brian Cage
- February 6 – Ivan Markov
- February 17 – Jimmy Jacobs
- February 24 – Corey Graves
- March 3 – Ivar
- March 9 – Pequeño Nitro (died in 2024)
- March 18 – Ultimate Spider Jr.
- April 20 – Garett Bischoff
- April 23 – Moose
- April 30
  - Daivari
  - El Hijo del Fantasma
- May 4:
  - Brad Maddox
  - Orange Cassidy
  - Sylvester Lefort
- May 7 – Kevin Owens
- May 14 – John Klinger (died in 2024)
- May 16 – Mickie Knuckles
- May 29 – Nia Jax
- June 5 – Madison Eagles
- June 30 – Scott Dawson
- July 12 – Sami Zayn
- July 13 – Ayumi Kurihara
- July 27 – Dark Sheik
- July 31 – El Texano Jr.
- August 20 – Fuka Kakimoto
- August 21
  - Erik
  - Eve Torres
  - Michael Dante
- September 3 – T. J. Perkins
- September 10 – Drake Younger
- September 13 – Baron Corbin
- September 19
  - Eva Marie
  - Lucky 13
- September 21 – Wale
- September 30 – Darryl Sharma
- October 6 – Afa Anoa'i Jr.
- October 22 - Aero Star
- November 7 - Jacob Novak (wrestler)
- November 13 – Sunil Singh
- November 18 – Alex Colon
- December 4 – Brooke Adams
- December 10 – JTG
- December 11 - James Ellsworth
- December 24 - Pat Buck
- December 25 – Rusev

== Debuts ==
- Uncertain debut date

- Steve Armstrong
- Rita Chatterton
- Steve Doll
- Fred Ottman
- Yokozuna
- Madusa
- The Pink Assassin
- Cynthia Moreno
- D. J. Peterson

- February - Italian Stallion and Tom Zenk
- March 3 -
  - Jushin Liger
  - Takuma Sano
- March 18 - Esther Moreno
- April 5 - Marty Jannetty
- April 7 - Pat Tanaka
- June 11 - Kendall Windham
- June 24 - Nikita Koloff
- July 21 - Kazue Nagahori and Condor Saito (All Japan Women)
- September 1 - Shinya Hashimoto
- October 2 - Scott Hall
- October 5 -
  - Masa Chono
  - Keiji Muto
- October 12 - Akira Nogami
- October 16 - Shawn Michaels

== Retirements ==
- Angelo Mosca (1969 - 1984)
- Billy Red Lyons (1956 - 1984)
- Paul Vachon (1957 - 1984)
- Stan Stasiak (1958 - 1984)
- Tommy Gilbert (1969 - 1984)
- Miguel Perez (1954-1984)

== Deaths ==
- January 18 – Lord Athol Layton, 62
- January 27 - Jim McMillen, 81
- February 5 - El Santo, 66
- February 10 – David Von Erich, 25
- March 4 – Helen Hild, 58
- May 16 - Andy Kaufman, 35
- May 17 – Max Palmer, 56
- May 22 - George Zaharias, 76
- May 24 – Vincent J. McMahon, 69
- July 14 – Brute Bernard, 63
- August 2 – Argentina Apollo, 46
- November 13 - Chief Little Wolf, 72

== See also ==
- List of WCW pay-per-view events
