= 1st Von Erich Memorial Parade of Champions =

Professional wrestling event

- Kerry Von Erich with an abdominal stretch on Ric Flair in the main event
- Promotion: World Class Championship Wrestling
- Date: May 6, 1984
- City: Irving, Texas
- Venue: Texas Stadium
- Attendance: 32,123

Event chronology
← Previous; Wrestling Star Wars	Next → Independence Day Star Wars

Parade of Champions chronology
← Previous; 1974	Next → 1985

The David Von Erich Memorial Parade of Champions, sequentially known as 1st Von Erich Memorial Parade of Champions, was a major professional wrestling event produced by World Class Championship Wrestling (WCCW) on May 6, 1984 at the Texas Stadium in Irving, Texas. The event was held by WCCW promoter Fritz Von Erich in memory of his son David Von Erich, who had died in February 1984. It was the sixth event in the Parade of Champions chronology.

Eight professional wrestling matches were contested on the card and seven matches were televised. In the main event, Ric Flair defended the NWA World Heavyweight Championship against the deceased David's brother Kerry Von Erich, taking the title match that was originally planned for David Von Erich that same year. Kerry defeated Flair to win the title.

In other prominent matches on the card, Chris Adams and Sunshine defeated Jimmy Garvin and Precious in a mixed tag team match, Fritz Von Erich, Kevin Von Erich, and Mike Von Erich defeated Fabulous Freebirds (Buddy Roberts, Michael Hayes, and Terry Gordy) to win the WCCW World Six-Man Tag Team Championship, Rock & Soul (Buck Zumhofe and Iceman King Parsons) defeated The Super Destroyers (Super Destroyer #1 and Super Destroyer #2) to win the NWA American Tag Team Championship, and Kamala wrestled The Great Kabuki to a double disqualification.

== Event ==
The event kicked off with a match between Kelly Kiniski and Johnny Mantell. This match was not televised and ended in a fifteen-minute time limit draw.

=== Preliminary matches ===
Parade of Champions kicked off with a match between Junkyard Dog and The Missing Link. Missing Link's manager Skandor Akbar distracted JYD, allowing Link to attack him and deliver a diving headbutt from the middle rope. Link then pinned JYD while Akbar held JYD's feet. However, a second referee came and reversed the decision, awarding the win to JYD via a disqualification.

Next, Chris Adams and Sunshine took on Jimmy Garvin and Precious in a mixed tag team match. Sunshine and Precious brawled outside the ring, while Adams pinned Garvin with a sunset flip for the win. Precious hit Sunshine with her purse after the match, causing Adams and Sunshine to chase Garvin and Precious to the backstage.

It was followed by a match between Chic Donovan and Butch Reed. Reed delivered a shoulder block to Donovan for the win.

Next, Kamala took on The Great Kabuki. Kabuki's manager Gary Hart rammed Kamala's manager Friday into the ring post, leading to Hart and Kamala's other manager Skandar Akbor beginning a brawl. Hart and Akbor entered the ring and continued to fight, leading to the referee ending the match via a double disqualification.

Later, the first championship match of the event took place as The Super Destroyers (Super Destroyer #1 and Super Destroyer #2) defended the NWA American Tag Team Championship against Rock & Soul (Buck Zumhofe and Iceman King Parsons). Parsons delivered a flying hip attack to the Super Destroyer #1 and pinned him, while Zumhofe held the Super Destroyer #2. As a result, Rock & Soul won the American Tag Team Championship.

It was followed by the penultimate match, in which Fabulous Freebirds (Buddy Roberts, Michael Hayes, and Terry Gordy) defended the WCCW World Six-Man Tag Team Championship against Fritz Von Erich, Kevin Von Erich, and Mike Von Erich. All six men brawled in the ring and Kevin delivered a diving crossbody to Roberts to pin him and win the World Six-Man Tag Team Championship for his team. Killer Khan attacked the Von Erichs after the match until Kerry Von Erich made the save for his family and they chased off Khan and the Freebirds.

=== Main event match ===
Ric Flair defended the NWA World Heavyweight Championship against Kerry Von Erich in the main event. There was no time limit and the match stipulated that Flair would lose the title if he got disqualified during the match. Von Erich reversed a hip toss attempt by Flair into a backslide and pinned Flair to win the NWA World Heavyweight Championship. After the match, Von Erich celebrated the title win with his family and several wrestlers from the WCCW roster.

== Reception ==
Parade of Champions was a massive success, drawing a crowd of 32,123 with a gate revenue of $402,000. The event received mixed reviews from critics.

Matt Adamson of 411Mania rated the event 5, stating that "While this show was incredibly important at the time and in the history of World Class, it doesn’t really hold up well." He recommended "tracking down the Six Man Tag, World Title match, and Badstreet USA video."

According to Arnold Furious, there were "some obvious bad matches on this card" but "it ended strong with two good bouts". He specifically praised the NWA World Heavyweight Championship match as "marginally better than history remembers it".

The NWA World Heavyweight Championship match between Kerry Von Erich and Ric Flair was awarded the Match of the Year by Pro Wrestling Illustrated.

In 2013, WWE wrestler Cody Rhodes considered the NWA World Heavyweight Championship main event, a five-star classic match.

== Aftermath ==
Kerry Von Erich retained the NWA World Heavyweight Championship against Ric Flair in a rematch on May 11, before eventually losing the title back to Flair in a two out of three falls match at an All Japan Pro Wrestling event on May 24.

On May 21, Super Destroyers defeated Rock & Soul in a rematch to win the American Tag Team Championship.

Fritz Von Erich vacated his one-third of the World Six-Man Tag Team Championship due to his retirement, awarding his half to Kerry Von Erich. However, the title was vacated due to the illegal Von Erich picking up the pinfall win at Parade of Champions. The vacant title was decided at the Independence Day Star Wars, where Fabulous Freebirds defeated Von Erichs.

Chris Adams continued the rivalry with Jimmy Garvin and Precious. At Independence Day Star Wars, Adams and Stella Mae French defeated Garvin and Precious in a loser leaves town steel cage match when Adams pinned Garvin, forcing Garvin and Precious to leave WCCW and end the feud.

== Results ==
No.	Results	Stipulations	Times
1^{D}	Kelly Kiniski vs. Johnny Mantell ended in a time-limit draw	Singles match	15:00
2	Junkyard Dog defeated The Missing Link (with Skandor Akbar) by disqualification.	Singles match	3:30
3	Chris Adams and Sunshine defeated Jimmy Garvin and Precious	Mixed tag team match	4:39
4	Butch Reed defeated Chick Donovan	Singles match	4:48
5	Kamala (with Skandor Akbar and Friday) vs. The Great Kabuki (with Gary Hart) ended in a double disqualification	Singles match	7:28
6	Rock & Soul (Buck Zumhofe and Iceman King Parsons) defeated The Super Destroyers (Super Destroyer #1 and Super Destroyer #2) (c)	Tag team match for the NWA American Tag Team Championship	8:12
7	Fritz Von Erich, Kevin Von Erich, and Mike Von Erich defeated the Fabulous Freebirds (Buddy Roberts, Michael Hayes, and Terry Gordy) (c)	Six-man tag team match for the WCCW World Six-Man Tag Team Championship	7:37
8	Kerry Von Erich defeated Ric Flair (c) via pinfall	Singles match for the NWA World Heavyweight Championship; This match had no time limit and the title could change hands on a disqualification.	18:35
(c) / – the champion(s) heading into the match; D / – this was a dark match

== See also ==
- 1984 in professional wrestling
