= Knuckles Madsen =

American professional wrestler

Personal information
- Born: Kevin Nickel; January 31, 1984 Memphis, Tennessee, U.S.
- Died: July 11, 2025 (aged 41) Benton County, Arkansas, U.S.
- Cause of death: Murder by shot

Professional wrestling career
- Ring name: Knuckles Madsen
- Billed height: 6 ft 3 in (191 cm)
- Billed weight: 229 lb (104 kg)
- Debut: 2007

Kevin Nickel (January 31, 1984 - July 11, 2025) was an American professional wrestler he was best known for his time in World Wrestling Entertainment (WWE) on the NXT brand under the ring name Knuckles Madsen. He also worked as Ivan Warsaw in the independents in Texas.

== Professional wrestling career ==
Nickel made his professional wrestling debut in 2007 in Nashville, Tennessee.

In 2012, Nickel signed with the WWE. His debut match was a victory over Oliver Grey on October 24, 2012, at an NXT house show. Nickel made his television debut for NXT on the May 29, 2013 episode of NXT under the ring name Knuckles Madsen competing in a battle royal for a #1 Contender spot for the NXT Championship but was unsuccessful. His next appearance was on the June 5, 2013 episode of NXT where he faced Mojo Rawley in a dark Match in a losing effort. He was released by WWE in December 2013 and retired from wrestling.

In 2021, he returned to wrestling, working for Southwest Wrestling Entertainment in Irving, Texas. On April 1, 2022, he made his debut for Texas Style Wrestling in Addison, Texas when he lost to Rodney Mack.

== Death ==
On July 11, 2025, Nickel was found on the side of an Arkansas highway with a gunshot wound to the abdomen. He was shot and murdered by ex-wife, Amanda Penny just three days after their divorce was finalized on July 8, according to court documents seen by the Northwest Arkansas Democrat Gazette. Penny was arrested and charged with murder. The ex-wife's new boyfriend, Michael Hogue, was also arrested over the murder, accused of pulling the trigger, according to the documents.
