= Michael Hayes (wrestler) =

American professional wrestler (born 1959)

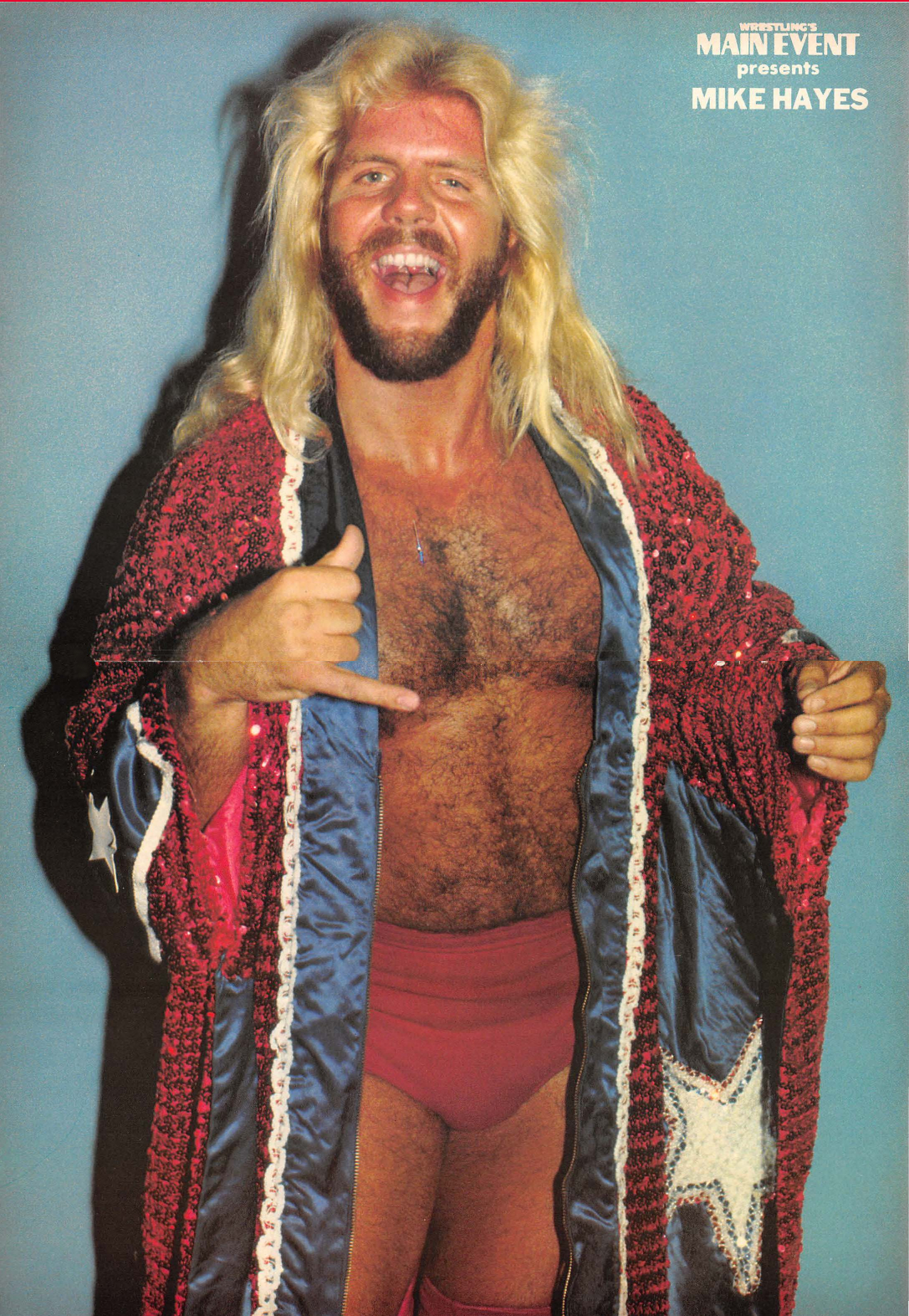
- Hayes, c. 1985

Personal information
- Born: Michael Seitz; March 29, 1959 (age 67) Pensacola, Florida, U.S.

Professional wrestling career
- Ring names: Dok Hendrix; Lord Michael Hayes; Michael "P.S." Hayes; Screaming Eagle; Freebird Michael Hayes
- Billed height: 6 ft 1 in (185 cm)
- Billed weight: 255 lb (116 kg)
- Billed from: "Badstreet U.S.A. in Atlanta, Georgia"
- Trained by: Afa Anoa'i; Sika Anoa'i; Mike Boyette
- Debut: 1977
- Retired: 1999

Michael Seitz (born March 29, 1959) is an American professional wrestling executive, retired professional wrestler and former musician, better known by the ring name Michael "P.S." Hayes. (Note: "P.S." is an abbreviation of "Purely Sexy".) He is employed by the professional wrestling promotion WWE as Vice President, Creative Writing & Booking.

Debuting in 1977, Hayes came to prominence in 1979 as the founder and leader of stable the Fabulous Freebirds. Over the following 15 years, the Fabulous Freebirds wrestled for promotions including Mid-South Wrestling, the World Class Wrestling Association (WCWA), the World Wrestling Federation (WWF), and World Championship Wrestling (WCW), holding championships including the WCWA World Six-Man Tag Team Championship, WCWA World Tag Team Championship, WCW World Tag Team Championship, and WCW World Six-Man Tag Team Championship. After largely retiring from the ring in 1995, Hayes worked as an announcer and interviewer for the WWF (now WWE) before segueing into a behind-the-scenes production role. He was inducted into the WWE Hall of Fame in 2016 as part of the Fabulous Freebirds.

== Professional wrestling career ==
=== Early career (1977–1979) ===
Hayes started wrestling in 1977 in the Tennessee regional promotions. In 1978, he wrestled his first tour overseas in Germany for IBV which later became the Catch Wrestling Association.

In 1978, Hayes formed a tag team with Terry "Bam Bam" Gordy called the Fabulous Freebirds.

=== Mid-South Wrestling (1979–1980) ===
In late 1979, Hayes and Gordy moved to Bill Watts' Mid-South Wrestling promotion, where they swiftly defeated Watts and Buck Robley for the Mid-South Tag Team Championship. Their first reign lasted until March 1980, when they lost to Paul Orndorff and Ted DiBiase. They regained the titles later that month. While in Mid-South Wrestling, Hayes and Gordy were joined by Buddy "Jack" Roberts, expanding the Freebirds from a tag team to a stable. Hayes adopted the moniker "P. S." ("Purely Sexy") and began moonwalking in the ring like Michael Jackson at his concerts.

The Freebirds' second reign as Mid-South Tag Team Champions ended in April 1980 when they lost to Buck Robley and Junkyard Dog. This led to a match on June 9, 1980 in the Municipal Auditorium putting Robley and Junkyard Dog against Gordy and Roberts (accompanied by Hayes), with the stipulation that the loser would have their hair removed. After Robley lost the match and the titles, Hayes poured hair removal cream in Junkyard Dog's eyes, (kayfabe) blinding him. The angle saw Junkyard Dog seemingly forced to retire from wrestling; after he gave a promo in which he revealed that he could not see his new-born daughter, the heat on the Freebirds became extreme, with fans attempting to attack them. The Freebirds added to the heat by appearing on television wearing dark glasses and carrying canes to mock the blinded Junkyard Dog. Junkyard Dog returned to the ring on August 2, 1980 at Mid-South Wrestling's "Superdome Extravaganza" show in New Orleans' Louisiana Superdome, defeating Hayes in a steel cage dog collar match. Junkyard Dog went on to face Hayes and the Freebirds in a series of violent matches, including dog collar matches, cage matches, "Jim Bowie" death matches, and loser leaves town matches. The feud culminated in a lights out no disqualification match in the Riverside Centroplex in Baton Rouge, Louisiana on November 4, 1980 where Junkyard Dog and Bill Watts defeated Hayes and Gordy. Following the match, Hayes and the other Freebirds left Mid-South Wrestling for Georgia Championship Wrestling.

=== Georgia Championship Wrestling (1980–1982) ===
Hayes (center) with Buddy Roberts and Terry Gordy, c. 1981

In October 1980, the Fabulous Freebirds joined Georgia Championship Wrestling, where Hayes and Gordy swiftly defeated Mr. Wrestling and Mr. Wrestling II for the NWA Georgia Tag Team Championship. They defended the titles under the "Freebird Rule", where any two of the Freebirds would wrestle in title matches. In November 1980, the Championship was held up after a match against Austin Idol and Kevin Sullivan, after which the titles were abandoned. That same month, Hayes and Gordy defeated Steve Keirn and Terry Taylor to become the inaugural NWA National Tag Team Champions. In January 1981, Stan Frazier and Ted DiBiase defeated Hayes and Roberts for the title, with Hayes and Gordy regaining the titles five days later. Their second reign ended in June 1981 when Hayes and Roberts lost to DiBiase and Steve Olsonoski.

In June 1981, the Fabulous Freebirds disbanded after Roberts left Georgia Championship Wrestling and Hayes and Gordy began feuding with one another. In September 1981, Hayes and Otis Sistrunk defeated Gordy and Jimmy Snuka in a cage match for the NWA National Tag Team Championship. The titles were vacated shortly thereafter when Sistrunk left the promotion. The feud between Hayes and Gordy continued into early 1986, with the former partners facing each other in gimmick matches including lumberjack matches, taped fist matches, and "loser must drink from a baby bottle" matches.

In mid-1982, Hayes and Gordy patched up their differences and reformed the Freebirds as a duo. In July 1982, they defeated Big John Studd and Super Destroyer for the NWA National Tag Team Championship. They lost the titles to the Wild Samoans the following month. They left Georgia Championship Wrestling shortly thereafter for Texas.

=== World Class Championship Wrestling (1982–1984) ===
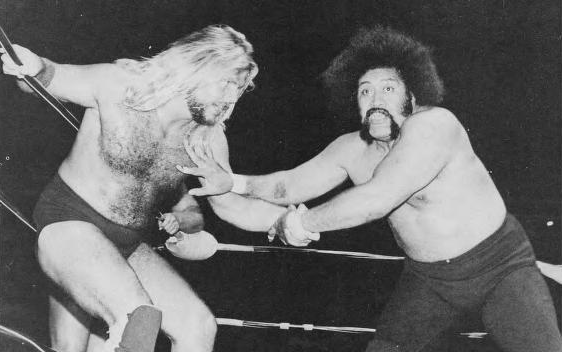
Hayes (left) being Irish whipped by Afa, c. 1983

In 1982, the Freebirds left for World Class Championship Wrestling (WCCW), where they had one of their most famous feuds. Hayes was chosen by the fans to be the special guest referee during the Ric Flair-Kerry Von Erich NWA World Heavyweight Championship steel cage match at Christmas Star Wars. Hayes at one point knocked Flair out so Von Erich could get the pin and the title. Von Erich refused to pin him after the dirty deed which ultimately led to Gordy slamming the cage door on Von Erich's head. As this later cost him the title, it triggered the feud between The Fabulous Freebirds and The Von Erichs and ended a good respectful friendship between both groups. The Freebird-Von Erich feud ended for good in 1993 during a memorial card in tribute to Kerry Von Erich.

Hayes was always the leader of the group with his exceptional mic skills and he recorded the team's new theme song, Badstreet USA, in 1983. The video to the song features all three of The Fabulous Freebirds as well as Jimmy Garvin, who was often considered the fourth Freebird. They had used the Lynyrd Skynyrd song "Free Bird" and Willie Nelson's version of "Georgia on My Mind" up to that point and would on occasion in the future.

=== All Japan Pro Wrestling (1984) ===
In January 1984, Hayes, Gordy, and Roberts wrestled in Japan with All Japan Pro Wrestling (AJPW) as part of its "New Year Giant Series", unsuccessfully challenging NWA International Tag Team Champions Giant Baba and Jumbo Tsuruta in Tokyo's Korakuen Hall. They returned to AJPW in October to November 1984 as part of its "Giant Series", during which Hayes unsuccessfully challenged NWA United National Champion Genichiro Tenryu in Nagasaki.

=== World Wrestling Federation (1984) ===
The Fabulous Freebirds debuted in the World Wrestling Federation (WWF) in August 1984. During their nine-week stint in the WWF, they primary competed in six-man tag team matches and tag team matches, with their main opponents being the Moondogs. Several of their matches aired on WWF on PRISM Network, WWF on MSG Network, WWF Maple Leaf Wrestling, and WWF Championship Wrestling. In September 1984, they were abruptly fired from the WWF after showing up late and drunk for a show.

=== Championship Wrestling from Florida (1984–1985) ===
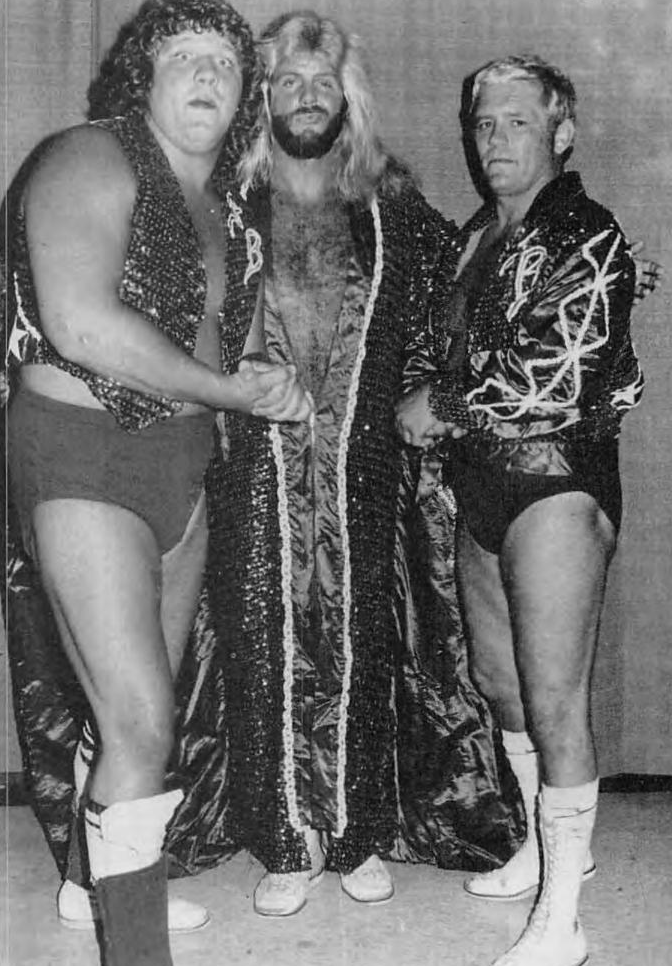
Hayes (center) with Terry Gordy and Buddy Roberts, c. 1985

In December 1984, Hayes joined the Florida-based NWA territory Championship Wrestling from Florida, where he initially formed a tag team with Dutch Mantel before reuniting with Gordy and Roberts. The Fabulous Freebirds initially feuded with Boris Zhukov, Jim Neidhart, Krusher Kruschev, and The Saint, then feuded with the Assassins. In January 1985, Hayes unsuccessfully challenged NWA World Heavyweight Champion Ric Flair in Fort Lauderdale.

The Fabulous Freebirds regularly wrestled for Championship Wrestling from Florida until spring 1985. They went to divide their time between Florida, Mid-South Wrestling, and Texas (wrestling at the 2nd Von Erich Memorial Parade of Champions) before joining the American Wrestling Association.

=== American Wrestling Association (1985–1986) ===
In early-1985, the Fabulous Freebirds began wrestling for the Minneapolis-based American Wrestling Association (AWA). They competed primarily in the tag team division, though Hayes challenged AWA World Heavyweight Champion Rick Martel on several occasions. In September 1985 at SuperClash, the Fabulous Freebirds challenged AWA World Tag Team Champions the Road Warriors, winning the belts temporarily before the AWA overturned the decision. Later that month, the Fabulous Freebirds interfered in a bout between the Road Warriors and Jimmy Garvin and Steve Regal, helping Garvin and Regal win the titles. In January 1986, the Fabulous Freebirds lost a six-man tag team cage match to Jerry Blackwell and the Road Warriors. Following the match, the Fabulous Freebirds left the AWA to return to Texas. Hayes returned for a single night in April 1986, teaming with Jimmy Garvin in a loss to the Road Warriors in a cage match in the main event of the AWA supercard WrestleRock.

=== Universal Wrestling Federation (1986–1987) ===
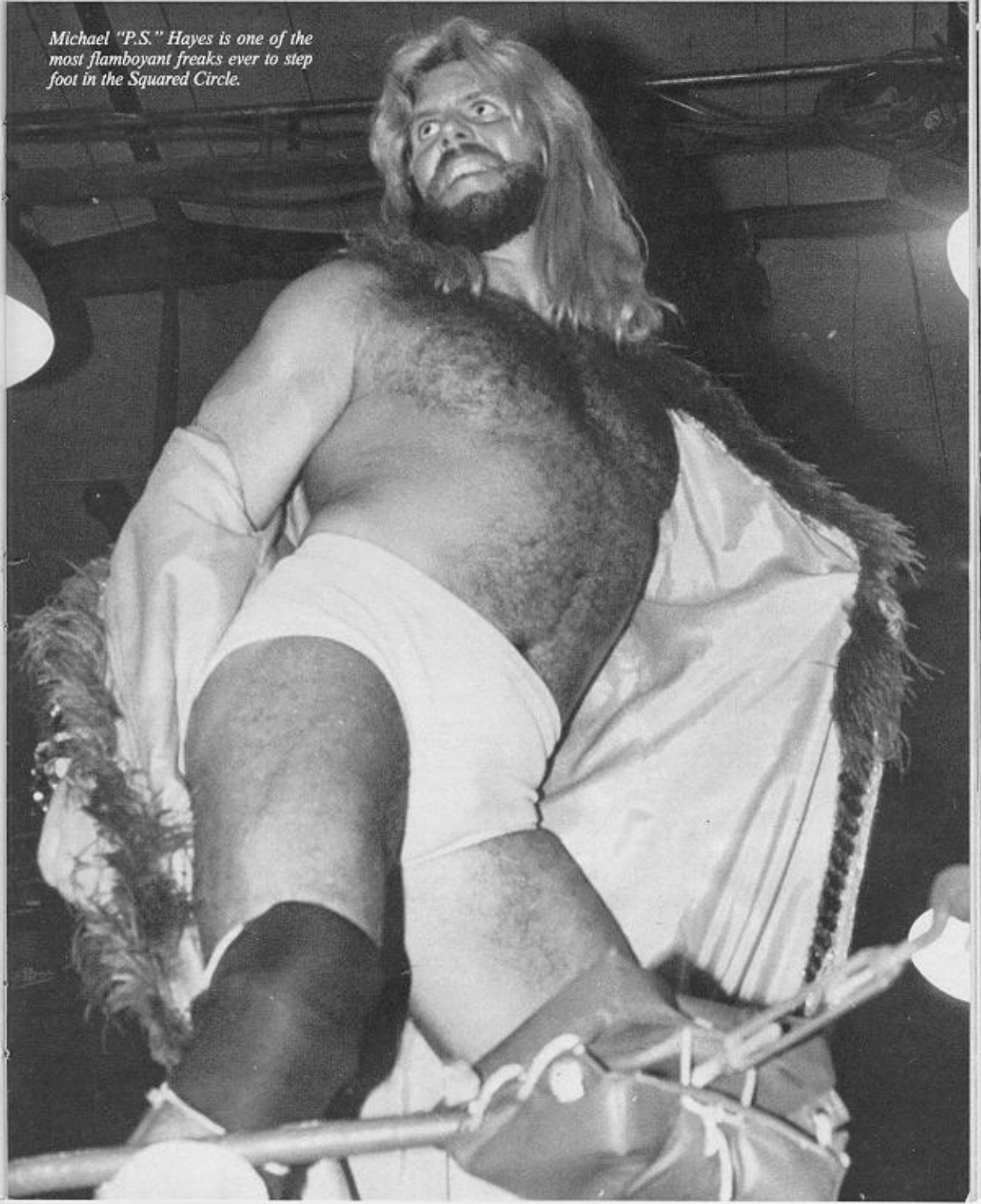
Hayes, c. 1987

In May 1986, the Fabulous Freebirds returned to Mid-South Wrestling, which had been renamed Universal Wrestling Federation with Sunshine as their manager. Soon after arriving, all three Freedbirds entered a tournament for the UWF Heavyweight Championship; Hayes was eliminated in the first round after wrestling Terry Taylor to a draw; Gordy went on to win the tournament. The Fabulous Freebirds vied with teams including the Rock 'n' Roll Express, the Fantastics, the Road Warriors, Chavo Guerrero and Terry Taylor, and "Dr. Death" Steve Williams amd Ted DiBiase. In October to November 1986, Hayes faced DiBiase in a series of "country whipping" matches. In November 1986 at the "Superdome Extravaganza" in the Louisiana Superdome, Hayes lost to Williams in a cage match.

After Gordy lost the UWF Heavyweight Championship by default to One Man Gang, the Freebirds engaged in a major heel versus heel feud with Skandor Akbar's Devastation, Inc. group. The feud continued even after Akbar double-crossed Gang and helped Big Bubba Rogers win the title from him. In August 1987, Gordy and Roberts left the UWF. Hayes remained in the UWF, allying with Shane Douglas against Big Bubba Rogers. In October 1987, Hayes briefly reformed the Fabulous Freebirds as a tag team with Jimmy Garvin as his partner. Hayes continued performing for the UWF until it closed down in late 1987.

=== Jim Crockett Promotions (1987–1988) ===
On April 9, 1987, the UWF was sold to Jim Crockett Promotions (JCP). The Freebirds joined the JCP roster in May 1987. Throughout mid-1987, they repeatedly challenged NWA United States Tag Team Champions The Midnight Express. At Starrcade '87: Chi-Town Heat in November 1987, Hayes teamed with Jimmy Garvin and Sting to face Eddie Gilbert, Larry Zbyszko, and Rick Steiner, with the match ending in a time-limit draw. In December 1987 and January 1988, Hayes had a series of matches against NWA World Heavyweight Champion Ric Flair, including a time limit draw that aired on NWA World Championship Wrestling. Hayes left JCP in January 1988 to return to Texas.

=== World Class Championship Wrestling (1988) ===
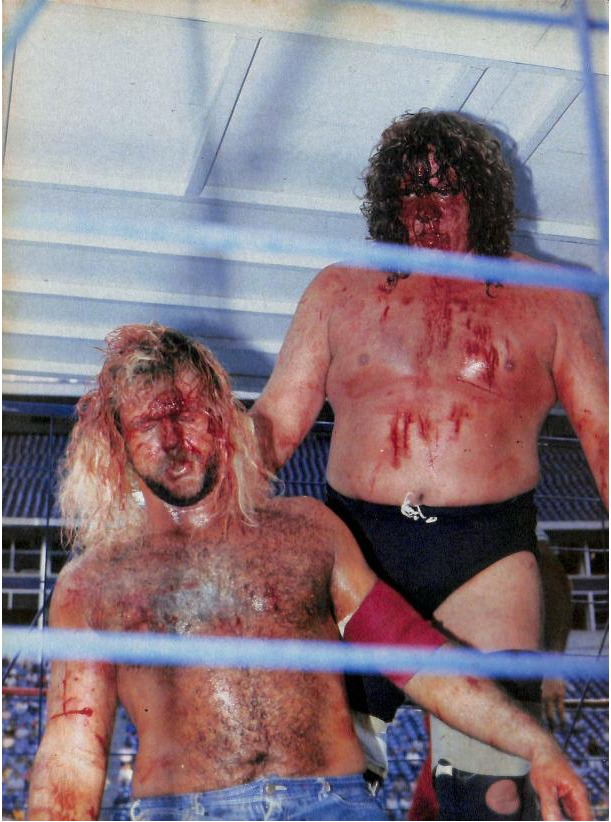
Hayes (left) and Terry Gordy, c. 1988

Hayes returned to World Class Championship Wrestling to find that his former Freebird partners Gordy and Roberts, in alliance with Iceman Parsons and The Angel of Death, had resumed their feud with the Von Erichs. After Gordy and Roberts helped Parsons win the World Class heavyweight title from Kerry Von Erich by bashing Kerry with socks loaded with weights while the arena lights were mysteriously turned off, a disgusted Hayes allied himself with the Von Erichs against his former Freebird 'brothers'. At the 1988 Parade of Champions, Gordy defeated Hayes in a hair vs hair "triple dome of terror" (three vertically stacked cages) match. After the match, however, Gordy refused to cut Hayes' hair and instead turned babyface on Roberts and cut his hair. Subsequently, Hayes and Gordy reunited as babyfaces and feuded with Roberts and his Samoan Swat Team as well as old Freebird enemies Devastation Inc, of whom Parsons was now a member.

While all this was going on, Hayes continued with his music career, often playing concerts with his Badstreet Band at the Dallas Sportatorium, World Class's main arena. Inevitably, the music career overlapped with World Class' storylines when, at one such concert, Roberts appeared onstage and hit Hayes over the head with a guitar. Hayes also formed a new tag team with "Do It To It" Steve Cox and together they twice briefly beat the Samoan Swat Team for the World Class tag team titles, on September 12–16, 1988, and October 15–17, 1988.

=== World Championship Wrestling (1989–1994) ===
In January 1989, Hayes returned to World Championship Wrestling (WCW) (formerly Jim Crockett Promotions) where he initially wrestled as a face allied with Junkyard Dog and Lex Luger. In March 1989, Hayes turned on Luger, aligning himself with Hiro Matsuda and his Yamazaki Corporation. In May 1989 at WrestleWar '89: Music City Showdown, Hayes defeated Luger for the NWA United States Heavyweight Championship following assistance from the debuting Terry Gordy, reformed the Fabulous Freebirds once more. Luger regained the title later that month by defeating Hayes on an episode of NWA World Wide Wrestling.

At Clash of the Champions VII in June 1989, the debuting Jimmy Garvin joined the Fabulous Freebirds; Hayes and Garvin defeated The Midnight Express for the vacant NWA World Tag Team Championship. Over the following months, they defended the titles against challengers such as The Midnight Express, the Steiner Brothers, and the Dynamic Dudes. At the Great American Bash in July 1989, the Fabulous Freebirds teamed with the Samoan SWAT Team in a loss to "Dr. Death" Steve Williams, The Midnight Express, and the Road Warriors in a WarGames match. Gordy left WCW in August 1989, leaving Hayes and Garvin as a tag team. At Clash of the Champions VIII in September 1989, Hayes and Garvin successfully defended the NWA World Tag Team Championship against the Steiner Brothers. At Halloween Havoc in October 1989, they successfully defended the titles against the Dynamic Dudes. Their reign ended in November 1989, when they lost to the Steiner Brothers on an episode of NWA World Championship Wrestling.

In January 1990, the Fabulous Freebirds entered a tournament for the vacant NWA United States Tag Team Championship; the following month, they lost to Flyin' Brian and Z-Man in the finals. In early 1990, they began feuding with the Rock 'n' Roll Express. In May 1990 at Capital Combat, the Rock 'n' Roll Express defeated the Fabulous Freebirds in a "corporal punishment match". In July 1990 at the Great American Bash, the Fabulous Freebirds lost to the Steiner Brothers. Later that month, they began feuding with the Southern Boys, who defeated them at Clash of the Champions XII in September 1990. At Halloween Havoc in October 1990, they defeated the Renegade Warriors (Chris Youngblood and Mark Youngblood). That same month, they began feuding with Ricky Morton and Tommy Rich, who defeated them at Starrcade '90: Collision Course in December 1990.

On February 24, 1991 at WrestleWar, Hayes and Garvin defeated Doom for the vacant WCW World Tag Team Championship; they lost the titles to the Steiner Brothers on February 18, 1991 in a match on WCW Pro that aired on March 9, 1991 (but was recorded on February 18, 1991, prior to their winning the titles). In May 1991 at SuperBrawl I, they defeated the Young Pistols for the vacant WCW United States Tag Team Championship. That same month, they were joined by a third Freebird, the masked Badstreet. In June 1991, the Fabulous Freebirds defeated Junkyard Dog and Tommy Rich in a handicap match for the WCW World Six-Man Tag Team Championship, making Hayes a double champion. They had two managers briefly, Big Daddy Dink and Diamond Dallas Page. In August 1991, the Fabulous Freebirds lost the WCW World Six Man Tag Team Championship to Big Josh, Dustin Rhodes, and Z-Man and the WCW United States Tag Team Championship to the WCW Patriots (Firebreaker Chip and Todd Champion), with Badstreet leaving the Freebirds. In late 1991, they feuded with the WCW Patriots and the Enforcers (Arn Anderson and Larry Zbyszko). In December 1991 at Starrcade '91: Battlebowl – The Lethal Lottery, Hayes entered the Lethal Lottery, teaming with Tracy Smothers in a loss to Jimmy Garvin and Marcus Alexander Bagwell. The Freebirds turned face, and Garvin's wife Precious became their on-screen manager.

At Clash of the Champions XVIII in January 1992, Hayes and Garvin defeated Big Josh and Brad Armstrong. At WrestleWar '92 in May 1992, Hayes and Garvin defeated Greg Valentine and the Taylor Made Man for the WCW United States Tag Team Championship. They held the titles until June 1992, when they lost to the Barbarian and Dick Slater. In the same month, they entered a tournament for the NWA World Tag Team Championship, defeating Silver King and Silver King II in the first round at Clash of the Champions XIX, but losing to Hiroshi Hase and Shinya Hashimoto in the quarterfinals at the Great American Bash in July 1992. The Fabulous Freebirds disbanded in August 1992.

In late-1992, Hayes turned heel again and started managing Arn Anderson and Bobby Eaton, who were still members of the Dangerous Alliance. He became a member of sorts and helped Paul E. Dangerously in his feud with Madusa. At Halloween Havoc in October 1992, Hayes, Anderson, and Eaton lost to Johnny Gunn, Shane Douglas and Z-Man.

In early 1993, Hayes became a fan favorite again and feuded with Paul Orndorff over the WCW World Television Championship. He then briefly teamed (and later feuded) with Johnny B. Badd and also did some commentating. Hayes resigned from WCW in January 1994, after being offered a $75,000 (equivalent to $163,000 in 2025) a year contract. He made his final appearance with the promotion at SuperBrawl IV in February 1994, accompanying Jimmy Garvin to ringside for his match with Johnny B. Badd.

=== Global Wrestling Federation (1994–1995) ===
Hayes went back to Dallas to the Global Wrestling Federation and reunited with Garvin and Gordy as The Freebirds, whom he managed them to win their Tag Team Championship, before the company folded that September. After the GWF folded, Hayes remained in Dallas for the National Wrestling Alliance's stay in Dallas, which lasted until April 1995.

=== Return to WWF/WWE (1995–present) ===
==== Dok Hendrix (1995–1999) ====
Michael Hayes received a tryout match with the WWF on February 21, 1995, at a WWF Superstars taping in Augusta, Georgia. Wrestling in a dark match, Hayes competed as a face and defeated Ken Raper. However he retired from active competition due to a serious back injury he suffered while in WCW and after the NWA's Dallas promotion ended, and debuted on April 14 on WWF Superstars, he suggested the name "Dok Hendrix" after Doc Severinsen and Jimi Hendrix. Hayes served as a heel announcer and was a color commentator alongside Vince McMahon and Hayes also joined McMahon on a few pay-per-view events in 1995. Hayes was also co-host of WWF Action Zone with Todd Pettengill. Hayes later dropped the heel attitude in spring 1996. Among other interviews, it was Hayes who conducted the interview with Steve Austin at King of the Ring 1996 where Austin first used the "Austin 3:16" catchphrase. Hayes also worked as a color commentator in 1995 with Vince McMahon on WWF Superstars and on the In Your House 1 and the 1995 King of the Ring pay-per-view events and replaced Jerry Lawler for the last two matches at SummerSlam 1995.

==== Managing the Hardy Boyz (1999) ====
Hayes returned to WWF television in 1999 as the manager for the Hardy Boyz. He competed in a couple of matches with the Hardy Boyz against the Brood. The Hardy Boyz lost the WWF Tag Team Championship to the Acolytes at Fully Loaded when Hayes was pinned in a handicap match. Hayes defeated Tracy Smothers on the July 17 episode of WWF Shotgun Saturday Night. He was fired by them in August.

==== Backstage roles (1999–present) ====
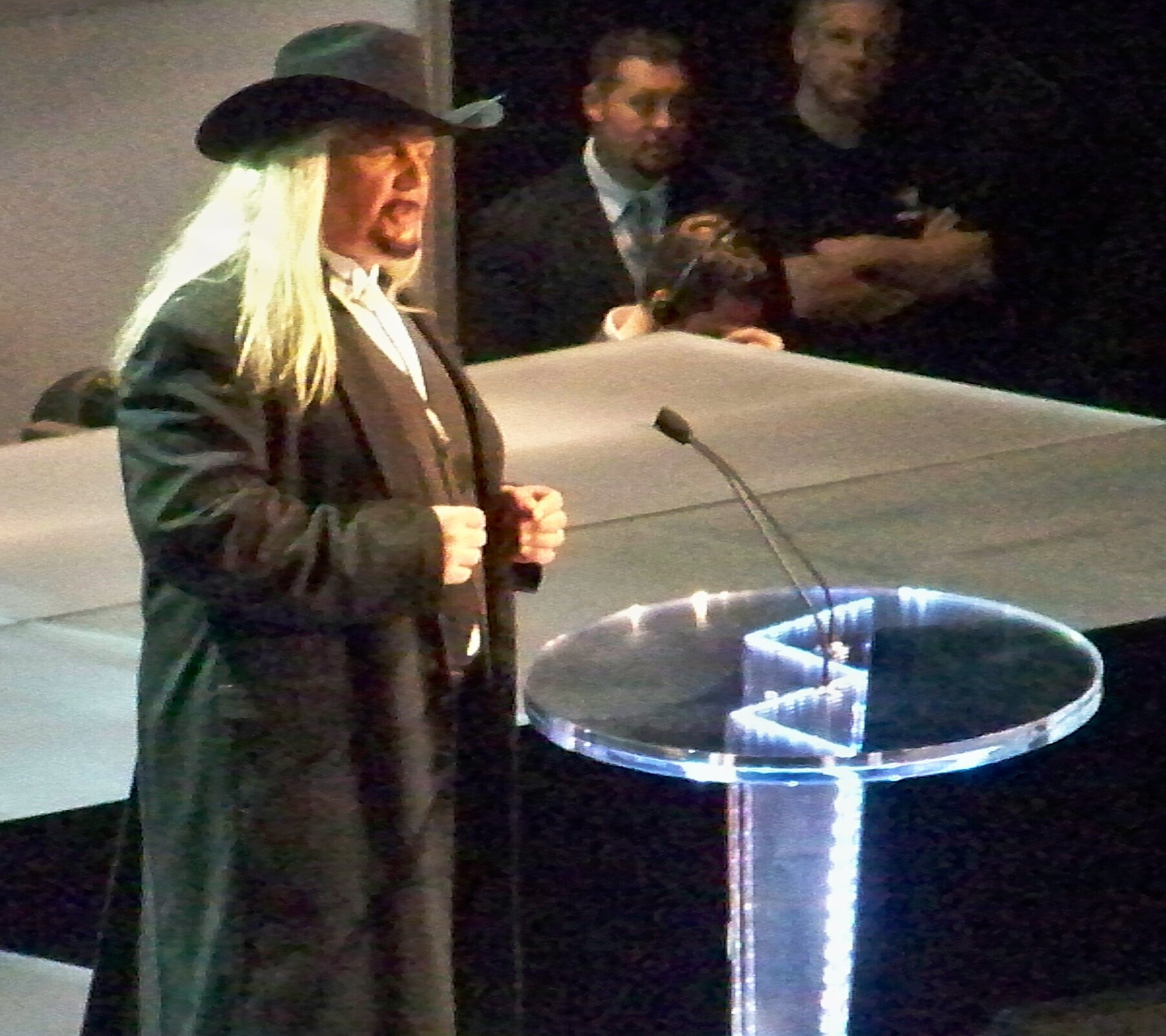
Hayes speaking at a WWE Hall of Fame ceremony in 2009

Hayes then became a backstage road agent (producer) and color commentator for the WWF. Initially appearing for one night on the September 23, 1999 broadcast of SmackDown!, Hayes became a color commentator on Sunday Night Heat alongside Michael Cole and Kevin Kelly from 2000 to 2001, although he was mostly used on the international broadcasts of that show.

At WrestleMania X-Seven on April 1, 2001, he competed in the gimmick Battle Royal, but was eliminated by the One Man Gang. During the December 5, 2005 episode of RAW, he became involved in verbal sparring with Edge in which Hayes attacked Edge's lack of main event experience and the details of his love life (with regard to Matt Hardy and Lita). Hayes was later attacked by Edge.

In October 2006, Hayes became the head creative writer for the SmackDown brand after Alex Greenfield's departure from the company. He can be seen on the second season of WWE Classics on Demand series Legends of Wrestling. Hayes made occasional appearances on WWE programs: on the December 7, 2007 episode of SmackDown, Hayes was a guest of MVP's VIP Lounge. Hayes promoted the new Triumph and Tragedy of WCCW DVD and reinforced its anti-drug message. However, Hayes ended up being attacked by MVP before being saved by Rey Mysterio Jr. On the June 28, 2010 episode of Raw, Hayes was one of several Legends who accompanied Ricky "The Dragon" Steamboat, who was out to promote his new DVD. Hayes and the other legends were later attacked by the NXT season 1 graduates, collectively known as The Nexus. On the May 12, 2011 episode of WWE Superstars, Hayes accompanied Tyson Kidd to the ring but turned on him a week later after Kidd lost his match to Yoshi Tatsu. Hayes hit Kidd, stating he had better things to do than hang around losers.

In October 2013, Hayes took a leave of absence from WWE for personal reasons, but he returned to work on December 2, 2013. On August 1, 2014, Hayes appeared in a short segment on the online series JBL and Cole Show in which he stared at a "Free Birds, call to enquire" flier. In February 2015, Hayes partook in a WWE.com interview alongside Arn Anderson with Michael Cole to discuss Triple H and Sting's match at WrestleMania 31. On April 2, 2016, Hayes was inducted into the WWE Hall of Fame with the Fabulous Freebirds. Hayes accepted the award alongside Jimmy Garvin.

Hayes took a hiatus from his position on the creative team in November 2024 reportedly for personal reasons, until he was named in an amended lawsuit in January 2025 involving McMahon and a former female WWE employee, Janel Grant who alleged that McMahon ordered her to create explicit content for Hayes and backstage personnel in September 2020.

=== Independent circuit (1998–2000) ===
In 1998, Hayes returned to the ring for the first time in four years working in the independents reuniting with Terry Gordy at Bad Boys of Wrestling in Wyoming. In 1999, he competed for Power Pro Wrestling, where he won the promotion's title. He defeated The Honky Tonk Man on May 8, 1999, at Superstars of Wrestling. On January 21, 2000, Gordy and Hayes wrestled for Oklahoma Pro Wrestling when they lost to the Hardy Boyz.

== Music career ==
In 1987, on the back of the popularity of the "Badstreet USA" theme, Hayes recorded and released an album, Off The Streets. He also performed live concerts to promote the album with his backing band, the Badstreet Band. The July 1988 issue of Pro Wrestling Illustrated (written circa March 1988) contained a (possibly kayfabed) column by writer Dave Rosenbaum in which he visited the box office for a Badstreet Band show and surveyed what sort of people would actually go to Hayes' concerts. In 1992, Hayes performed a duet with music producer Darwin Conort called "Freebird Forever" on the WCW album, Slam Jam 1.

During his WWE tenure, he recorded a couple of songs too, most famously "Big", Big Show's theme from 1999 to 2006, and "Bald Headed Blues" which is played during Vince McMahon's head-shaving segment at WrestleMania 23.

In 2011, Hayes paid tribute to his Freebird brother Terry Gordy, who died of a heart attack caused by a blood clot in 2001, with a song entitled "Freebird Road" produced with Darwin Conort, based on Johnny VanZant's "Brickyard Road" (with permission). His music video was an emotional and stirring trip down memory lane as a Freebird and shows shots of him at Gordy's grave.

== Other media ==
In 1986, Hayes appeared in the opening credits of Highlander alongside The Fabulous Freebirds, working his Purely Sexy gimmick on the turnbuckle while writhing free of his ring robe.

=== Filmography ===
Year	Title	Role	Notes
1983	Badstreet U.S.A.	Self	Music video
1984	Highlander	Wrestler	Uncredited; acting debut
2014	Freebird Road	Self	Music video
2026	Agent of Shadows	Gary Abruzzo	Microdrama series

== Championships and accomplishments ==
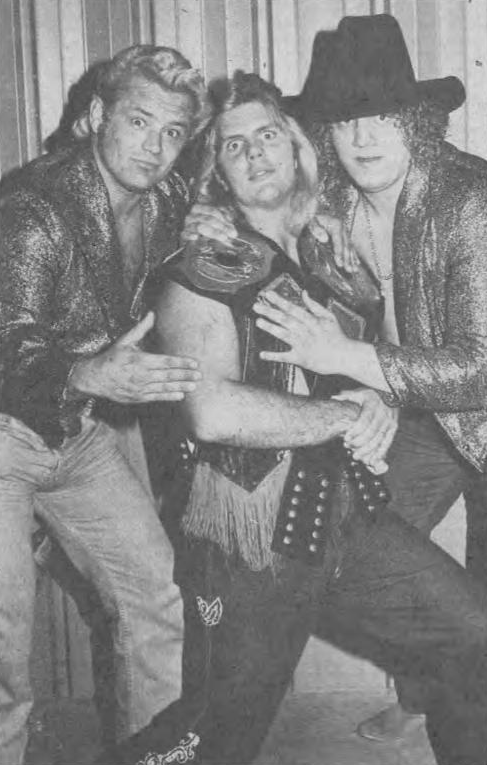
Hayes (center) as NWA Georgia Tag Team Champion, c. 1981

- Cauliflower Alley Club
  - Lou Thesz Award (2014)
- Georgia Championship Wrestling
  - NWA Georgia Tag Team Championship (1 time) – with Terry Gordy
  - NWA National Tag Team Championship (4 times) – with Terry Gordy (3 times) and Otis Sistrunk (1 time)
  - NWA United National Championship (1 time)
- Mid-South Wrestling
  - Mid-South Tag Team Championship (2 times) – with Terry Gordy
- NWA Mid-America
  - NWA Mid-America Tag Team Championship (2 times) – with Terry Gordy
- Power Pro Wrestling
  - Power Pro Wrestling Heavyweight Championship (1 time)
- Professional Wrestling Hall of Fame
  - Class of 2015 as a member of the Fabulous Freebirds
- Pro Wrestling Illustrated
  - PWI Tag Team of the Year award in 1981 – with Terry Gordy
  - PWI ranked him #56 of the top 500 singles wrestlers in the PWI 500 in 1992
  - PWI ranked him #71 of the top 500 singles wrestlers of the "PWI Years" in 2003
  - PWI ranked him #3 of the top 100 tag teams of the "PWI Years" with Terry Gordy in 2003
- World Championship Wrestling
  - NWA United States Heavyweight Championship (1 time)
  - NWA (Mid-Atlantic)/WCW World Tag Team Championship (2 times) – with Jimmy Garvin
  - WCW United States Tag Team Championship (2 times) – with Jimmy Garvin
  - WCW World Six-Man Tag Team Championship (1 time) – with Jimmy Garvin and Badstreet
- World Class Championship Wrestling / World Class Wrestling Association
  - NWA American Tag Team Championship (1 time) – with Terry Gordy
  - WCWA World Six-Man Tag Team Championship (7 times) – with Terry Gordy & Buddy Roberts (6 times) and Kerry Von Erich and Kevin Von Erich (1 time)
  - WCWA World Tag Team Championship (2 times) – with Steve Cox
- WWE
  - WWE Hall of Fame (Class of 2016) as a member of The Fabulous Freebirds
- Wrestling Observer Newsletter
  - Most Charismatic (1981)
  - Best Three-Man Team (1984) with Buddy Roberts and Terry Gordy
  - Best Heel (1983,1986)
  - Feud of the Year (1983, 1984) with Buddy Roberts and Terry Gordy vs. the Von Erichs
  - Match of the Year (1984) with Buddy Roberts and Terry Gordy vs. the Von Erichs on July 4
  - Best Color Commentator (1986)
  - Wrestling Observer Newsletter Hall of Fame (Class of 2005) – as part of the Fabulous Freebirds

== Discography ==
=== Single ===
- Badstreet USA Grand Theft Records 1984

=== Album ===
- Off The Streets – Grand Theft Records 1987

Track list:

1. "Everything Is Alright" (4:00)
2. "When The Love Comes Down" (3:55)
3. "The Night You Can't Remember" (4:14)
4. "Ain't Superstitious" (3:46)
5. "Touch My Level" (3:32)
6. "I Gotta Have It" (3:35)
7. "The Boys Are Back In Town" (4:49)
8. "You Made Me The Way I Am" (4:49)
9. "Blue Jean Queen" (5:25)
10. "Heartbeat Away" (4:42)
11. "Badstreet USA" (4:21)
