= Kamala (wrestler) =

American professional wrestler (1950–2020)

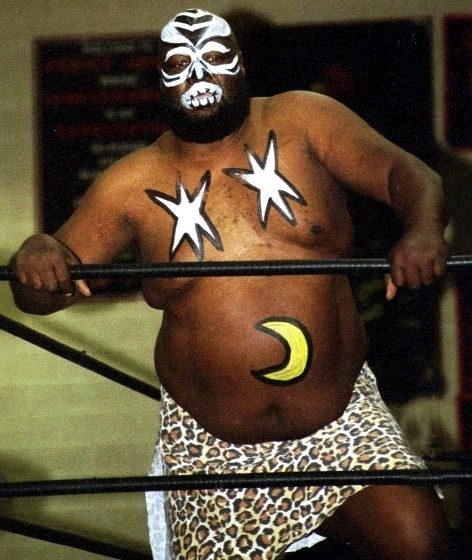
- Kamala in 2009

Personal information
- Born: James Arthur Harris; May 28, 1950 Senatobia, Mississippi, U.S.
- Died: August 9, 2020 (aged 70) Oxford, Mississippi, U.S.
- Cause of death: Cardiac arrest with comorbid diabetes and COVID-19
- Spouses: Clara Freeman (m. 1974; div. 2005) Emmer Jean Bradley (m. 2006)
- Children: 6
- Website: kamalaspeaks.com

Professional wrestling career
- Ring name(s): Bad News Harris; Giant Kamala; Giant Kamala 1 Gigante Kimala; Gigante Kimala 1 Giant Kimala; Giant Kimala 1 Big Jim Harris; Kamala; Kamala 1 Kimala; Lord of The Jungle; The Mississippi Mauler; Sugar Bear Harris; Bad Leroy Brown; Ugly Bear Harris
- Billed height: 6 ft 7 in (201 cm)
- Billed weight: 410 lb (186 kg)
- Billed from: Uganda, Jungles of Africa
- Trained by: Bobo Brazil "Tiny" Tim Hampton
- Debut: 1978
- Retired: 2010

James Arthur Harris (May 28, 1950 – August 9, 2020), better known by his ring name Kamala, was an American professional wrestler. Nicknamed "The Ugandan Giant", Kamala depicted a fearsome and simpleminded Ugandan. He wrestled barefoot, clad only in a loincloth, his face painted with war paint and two stars painted on his chest and a moon painted on his stomach. During his ring entrance, he sported an African mask and wielded a spear and shield. He is best known for his appearances with the World Wrestling Federation (now WWE) over the course of numerous runs in the company between 1984 and 2006. In April 2025, Harris was inducted into the Legacy wing of the WWE Hall of Fame.

== Early life ==
Harris was born on May 28, 1950, in Senatobia, Mississippi, to Jessie Harris and Betsy Mosely. He grew up in Coldwater, Mississippi, where his family owned a furniture store. He had four sisters. When he was around four, his father was shot dead during a dice game, leaving the family impoverished. As a youth, Harris worked as a sharecropper to help support his family.

Harris left high school in the ninth grade and became a habitual burglar. In 1967, local police suggested he leave town. As Harris put it, "Back then if you didn't leave like they said, you would be found dead somewhere." He relocated to Florida, where he drove trucks and picked fruit. At age 25, he moved to Benton Harbor, Michigan, where he met wrestler Bobo Brazil. Harris then began training as a wrestler, under Brazil's friend, "Tiny" Tim Hampton. He moved to Arkansas to continue training and escape the snow in Michigan.

== Professional wrestling career ==
=== Early career (1978–1982) ===
Harris debuted in 1978 under the ring name "Sugar Bear" Harris. He spent most of his early career in the Southern United States, also using the ring names "Ugly Bear" Harris and "Big" Jim Harris. His first manager was Percy Pringle. He won his first championship in NWA Tri-State in 1979, teaming with Oki Shikina to win the NWA Tri-State Tag Team Championship. In 1980, Harris joined Southeastern Championship Wrestling as "Bad News" Harris, winning the NWA Southeastern Heavyweight Championship in 1980. In 1981, Harris traveled to Europe for seasoning. Following a stint in Germany, he traveled to the United Kingdom, where he wrestled for Joint Promotions as "The Mississippi Mauler", a character with some similarities to his future Kamala character. In June 1981, he competed in a tournament for the vacant WWA World Heavyweight Championship, losing to Wayne Bridges in the final in Wembley Arena in London.

=== Continental Wrestling Association (1982) ===
Harris returned to Senatobia in the United States in 1982 after sustaining a broken ankle. While visiting his friend The Dream Machine at the Mid-South Coliseum in nearby Memphis, Tennessee, to borrow ring attire, Harris met Continental Wrestling Association (CWA) promoter Jerry Lawler, who offered him a job. Harris, Lawler and Jerry Jarrett developed a new character for Harris, "Kimala" (later adjusted to "Kamala"), drawing upon ideas for a character originally developed for Harris by The Great Mephisto. The character was a vicious Ugandan headhunter with face and body paint copied from a Frank Frazetta painting. His backstory was that he was a former bodyguard of deposed President of Uganda Idi Amin who had been discovered by J. J. Dillon during an excursion to Africa. A promotional vignette aired on WMC-TV featuring a spear-wielding Kamala seemingly emerging from a steamy African jungle; the vignette was actually filmed on Jarrett's farm in Hendersonville, Tennessee, with the steam effect created using dry ice. To establish Kamala as a monstrous character, Jarrett instructed him to wrestle in a brawling style with chops and biting. To preserve kayfabe, Harris wore robes and refused to speak English while in public in Memphis. Kamala made his debut in the CWA in May 1982 with Dillon as his manager, losing to Lawler by disqualification in a match that sold out the Mid-South Coliseum. In June, he defeated Lawler for the AWA Southern Heavyweight Championship, which he held until August that year. Toward the end of the year, he feuded with the imposter "Kamala II".

=== Mid-South Wrestling (1982–1986) ===
In late-1982, Kamala began wrestling for Bill Watts' Mid-South Wrestling promotion. He was managed by Skandor Akbar and Friday (originally portrayed by Buddy Wayne, then by Frank Dalton), forming part of Akbar's villainous Devastation, Inc. stable. In April 1983, he wrestled André the Giant in a highly promoted bout at the Louisiana Superdome. During 1983, he faced The Junkyard Dog in a series of "battle of the monsters" matches.

=== World Class Championship Wrestling (1983–1985) ===
In March 1983, Kamala debuted in the Dallas, Texas-based World Class Championship Wrestling promotion. In October of that year, he challenged Harley Race for the NWA World Heavyweight Championship, losing by disqualification. In the same month, he began a lengthy feud with the Von Erich family, repeatedly facing brothers David, Kerry, and Kevin. In May 1984, he faced The Great Kabuki at the David Von Erich Memorial Parade of Champions, a tribute to David, who had died suddenly in February. Kamala continued to appear regularly with WCCW until late-1985.

=== World Wrestling Federation (1984) ===
At the insistence of André the Giant, Kamala debuted in the World Wrestling Federation (WWF) in July 1984. He was managed by Freddie Blassie and a masked "handler" in safari clothing known as "Friday" (played first by Frank Dalton then by Steve Lombardi). In a memorable segment on the television program Tuesday Night Titans, Kamala seemingly devoured a live chicken (with a cutaway shot of feathers flying out of his mouth shown to create the illusion). After defeating a series of opponents including B. Brian Blair, Salvatore Bellomo, and Chief Jay Strongbow, in August 1984 Kamala challenged Hulk Hogan for the WWF World Heavyweight Championship, wrestling him to a double count-out. In October 1984, he began a series of matches against André the Giant, among them a steel cage match which he lost after André twice sat on his chest. Kamala's final appearance was in a battle royal in November 1984.

=== Various promotions (1984–1986) ===
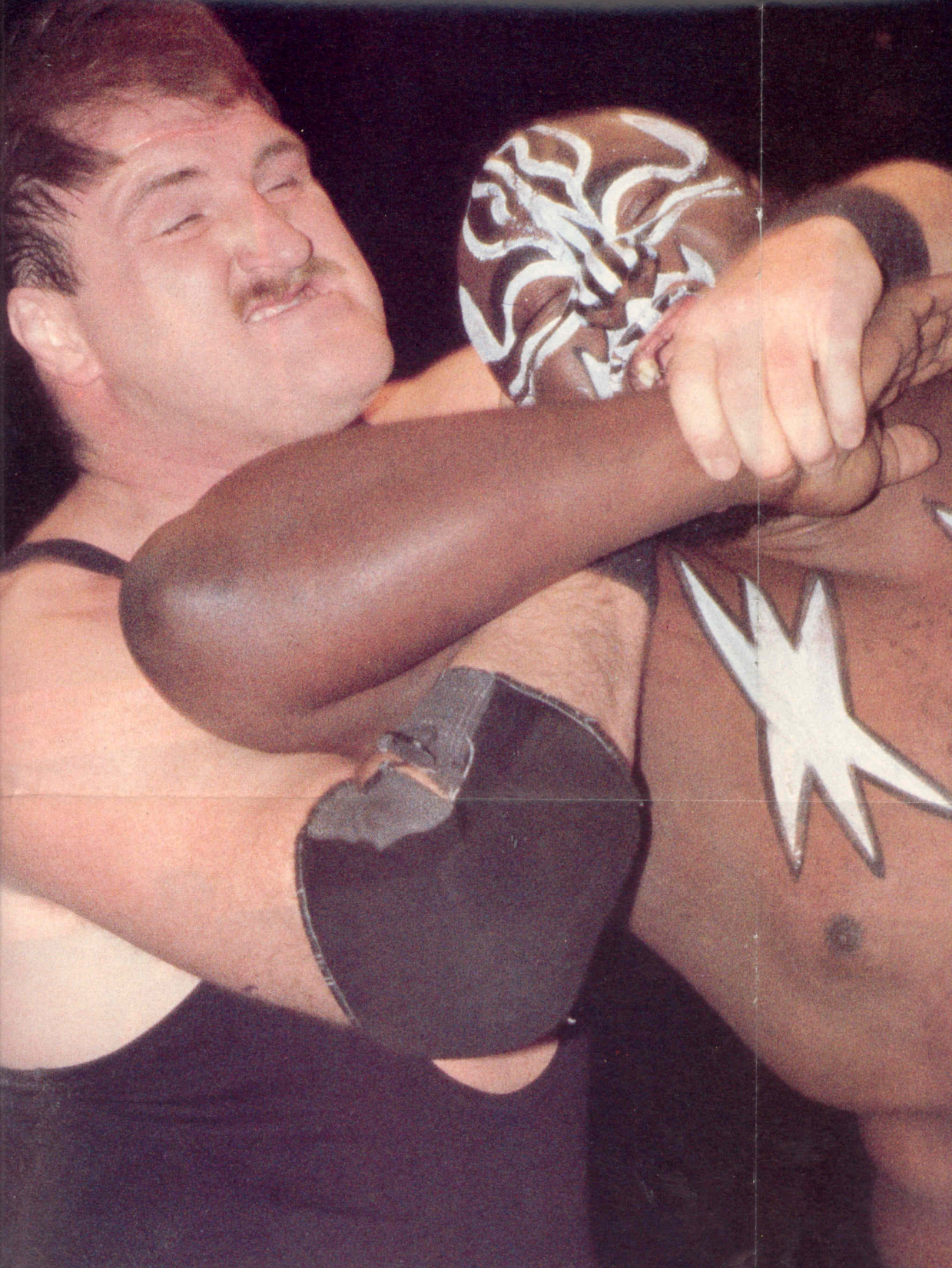
Kamala (right) during his feud with Sgt. Slaughter, c. 1985

After leaving the WWF in late 1984, Kamala went on to appear with multiple promotions throughout the United States and Canada. Throughout 1985, Kamala wrestled for the Minneapolis, Minnesota-based American Wrestling Association (AWA). He was established as a "monster" by winning a series of handicap matches. He feuded with Sgt. Slaughter, whom he defeated in a "Ugandan Death Match" in April 1985 but lost to in a "Boot Camp" steel cage match in June. At the SuperClash supercard in September 1985, Kamala lost to Jerry Blackwell in a body slam challenge.

Toward the end of the year, Kamala repeatedly challenged Rick Martel for the AWA World Heavyweight Championship, but failed to win the championship. In July 1985, Kamala wrestled for Jim Crockett Promotions at The Great American Bash, unsuccessfully challenging Magnum T. A. for the NWA United States Heavyweight Championship. In November 1985, Kamala made his first tour of Japan with All Japan Pro Wrestling. Wrestling as "Giant Kamala", he formed a tag team with fellow gaijin King Cobra. He made a second tour in February 1986 as "Kimala". In early-1986, Kamala had a short-run in the Montreal, Quebec, Canada-based Lutte Internationale promotion, where he was managed by Eddie Creatchman.

=== World Wrestling Federation (1986–1987) ===
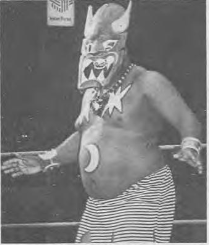
Kamala, circa 1987, wearing a traditional African mask before a match

Kamala returned to the WWF in July 1986, now managed by The Wizard and the masked "handler" Kim Chee (usually portrayed by Steve Lombardi). From November 1986 to February 1987, Kamala faced Hulk Hogan in a series of matches for the WWF World Heavyweight Championship, marking the pinnacle of his career. The run of matches included two bouts in Madison Square Garden that aired on WWF on MSG Network.

In February 1987, Kamala formed a tag team with the "Wild Samoan" Sika. In the same month, he began a feud with Jake Roberts, during which Roberts repeatedly exploited Kamala's purported fear of snakes. Kamala won this feud when he defeated Roberts at the 11th edition of Saturday Night's Main Event, with the help of "The Honky Tonk Man". In April 1987, The Wizard sold Kamala's managerial contract to Mr. Fuji. Harris was scheduled to once again face off against World Heavyweight Champion Hulk Hogan at Saturday Night's Main Event XII, but he abruptly left the WWF once more in September 1987 over frustrations about his pay.

=== Various promotions (1988–1992) ===
After leaving WWF, Kamala returned to World Class Championship Wrestling where he feuded with Kevin Von Erich, Kerry Von Erich and Michael Hayes before the promotion shut down in 1989, and he returned to All Japan with Abdullah the Butcher. From 1990 to 1991 he worked for Consejo Mundial de Lucha Libre in Mexico. He lost to Mil Máscaras in a cage match on March 17, 1991. Then he returned to Japan, working for All Japan with teaming with Botswana Beast, W*ING and Super World of Sports into 1992. He then debuted for the Memphis-based United States Wrestling Association (USWA) in 1990, feuding with Jerry Lawler, and winning the USWA Unified World Heavyweight Championship four times. He left the company in 1992.

=== World Wrestling Federation (1992–1993) ===
Kamala returned to the WWF on May 9, 1992, with Lombardi reprising the Kim Chee character and Harvey Wippleman (whom he met in the USWA under the name "Downtown Bruno") acting as his managers. In June 1992, he unsuccessfully challenged Randy Savage for the WWF World Heavyweight Championship. Throughout mid-1992, he wrestled primarily in house shows, with his regular opponents including The Undertaker, Bret Hart, Texas Tornado, and Ultimate Warrior. Kamala lost to The Undertaker by disqualification at SummerSlam in August 1992. Kamala later claimed that he was paid $13,000 for the bout while The Undertaker was paid $500,000. Professional wrestling journalist Dave Meltzer questioned this claim, saying: "I'm not saying he's lying, but that's hard to believe [...] for there to be that big of a disparity wouldn't make any sense." In November 1992, Kamala lost to The Undertaker at Survivor Series in the first ever televised casket match. In January 1993, Kim Chee and Wippleman began mistreating Kamala, leading him to break away from them and align himself with Reverend Slick, turning face for the first time in his WWF career.

Slick set out to humanize Kamala, leading to a series of skits in which he introduced him to activities such as ten-pin bowling. Kamala feuded with Kim Chee throughout early 1993. In March 1993, he began a series of matches with Bam Bam Bigelow. The two were scheduled to face one another at WrestleMania IX, but the match was canceled. In May 1993, Kamala lost a King of the Ring tournament qualifying match via countout to Mr. Hughes on an episode of WWF Wrestling Challenge. He went on to compete primarily at house shows until being released by the WWF that July. In December 1993, Kamala was announced as a participant in the 1994 Royal Rumble Match. During the bout the announcers noted that Virgil, as an alternate participant, had replaced him.

=== Semi-retirement (1993–1995) ===
After leaving the WWF once more, Harris stepped back from professional wrestling. He began working as a truck driver using two semi-trailer trucks he had purchased following his series of matches with Hulk Hogan. He only wrestled in independent shows and part-time for USWA. In December 1993, he wrestled in India where he won the vacated IAW Tag Team Titles with Dusty Wolfe defeating Leo Burke and the Mongolian Mauler.

=== World Championship Wrestling (1995) ===
At Hulk Hogan's suggestion, Kamala joined World Championship Wrestling (WCW) in 1995. He was introduced as part of Kevin Sullivan's Dungeon of Doom stable, whose goal was to end Hogan's career. In his first WCW pay-per-view appearance, he defeated "Hacksaw" Jim Duggan at Bash at the Beach. He lost a singles match to Hogan at Clash of the Champions XXXI. He was part of the "Dungeon of Doom" team at Fall Brawl, which lost to Hogan's team, "The Hulkamaniacs".

=== United States Wrestling Association (1996) ===
On January 24, 1996, Kamala returned to the USWA for the final time where he teamed with Brian Christopher and PG-13 to defeat Tracey Smothers, Doug Gilbert, Jesse James Armstrong, and Robert Gibson in an Iron Man match.

=== Late career (2001–2010) ===
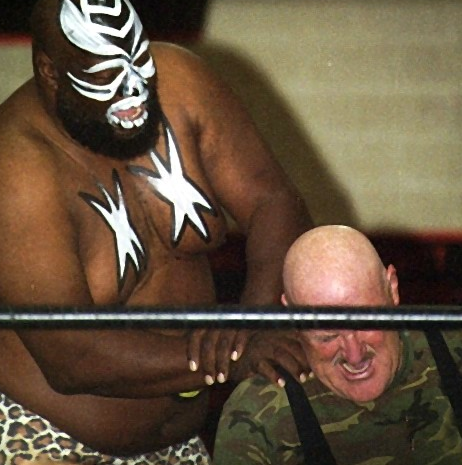
Kamala performing a shoulder claw on Sgt. Slaughter in 2009

Kamala participated in the "Gimmick Battle Royal" at WrestleMania X-Seven and was eliminated by Sgt. Slaughter.

Kamala lost to his nemesis Jerry Lawler at International Wrestling Cartel On July 20, 2002. From 2003 to 2004 he made appearances for Memphis Wrestling.

On July 26, 2004, Kamala made a surprise return to World Wrestling Entertainment (WWE), participating in a Raw Diva Search segment on RAW, in which the female contestants were instructed to try to seduce him.

Kamala lost to Jim Duggan at WrestleReunion 1 on January 29, 2005.

Kamala faced Randy Orton on the August 11, 2005, edition of SmackDown! (accompanied by Kim Chee) but the match was interrupted by a message from The Undertaker to Orton, and ended in a no contest. Kamala appeared at the 2005 Taboo Tuesday event, as one of the choices for Eugene's tag team partner. He lost the fan vote to Jimmy Snuka, but came to the ring after the match to deliver a big splash to Tyson Tomko. On June 25, 2006, at Vengeance, he accompanied Eugene to the ring (along with Doink the Clown and "Hacksaw" Jim Duggan) to take on Umaga. Umaga quickly won, then attacked all three. But before Kamala and Umaga could fight, Umaga's manager, Armando Estrada, intervened. Umaga defeated Kamala in a match the following night on Raw in his last appearance for the promotion.

On September 30, 2006, Kamala wrestled to a non-finish with Bryan Danielson, in a match for the ROH World Championship at a National Wrestling Alliance event in Bridgeport, Connecticut.

In 2007, Kamala defeated Lanny Poffo at Great North Wrestling event Wrestling Supershow at the Ottawa SuperEX in Ottawa, Canada. Kamala appeared at Total Nonstop Action Wrestling's Slammiversary pay-per-view in June 2008, as a guest at Jay Lethal and SoCal Val's storyline wedding. His last match was on August 15, 2010, at Juggalo Championship Wrestling with the Weedman defeating The Haters (Pauly and Vito Thomaselli).

== Professional wrestling style and persona ==
Writing about his character in March 2021, 411Mania's Ryan Byers called the character "problematic" since it promoted "all sorts of negative stereotypes of Africans and Black people more generally", but praised Harris's performance since "you believed he was what he was portraying, and, more importantly, you believed that he was dangerous".

== Personal life ==
Harris was married twice; his first marriage, to Clara Freeman in 1974, ended in divorce in 2005, while his second, to Emmer Jean Bradley in 2006, lasted until his death. Harris fathered five daughters and a son. Harris lived with his niece Ashley in Senatobia, Mississippi, until moving to Oxford, Mississippi.

In July 1993, Harris was called away from a WWF tour after a show in Oakland, California, when his youngest sister and her stepdaughter were shot dead. The killer attempted suicide, but only severely disfigured himself. After his WWF release that August, Harris pushed for the man's arrest and conviction. He was sentenced to life imprisonment, and died in 2013. Harris went on to help raise his surviving niece.

Beginning in 1993, Harris wrote, performed, and produced his own music. He wrote over 100 songs. Some discuss his frustration with the working conditions he experienced in the wrestling industry, most notably the low pay. He released his debut album, The Best of Kamala Vol 1, through his official website. The album features a ballad dedicated to the memory of Stanley "Tookie" Williams.

In 2015, Harris completed his autobiography along with one of his wrestling managers, Kenny Casanova, to help him offset medical costs. Kamala Speaks was funded on Kickstarter and self-published in December 2014. It tells his life story, of his wrestling career, and the loss of both of his legs to diabetes.

=== Health issues ===
On November 7, 2011, Harris had his left leg amputated below the knee due to complications of high blood pressure and diabetes, a condition he had since 1992, which forced him to retire because he did not accept dialysis treatment. In April 2012, his right leg was also amputated below the knee and a campaign was launched seeking donations to cover his financial needs. Harris told Bleacher Report in 2014 that he relied on a disability check, sold handmade wooden chairs, and had written a book about his life.

In July 2016, Harris was named as part of a class action lawsuit filed against WWE which alleged that wrestlers incurred traumatic brain injuries during their tenure and that the company concealed the risks of injury. The suit was litigated by attorney Konstantine Kyros, who has been involved in a number of other lawsuits against WWE. The lawsuit was dismissed by District of Connecticut judge Vanessa Lynne Bryant in September 2018. Mike Johnson of PW Insider wrote that his involvement in the lawsuit likely prevented WWE from inducting him into their Hall of Fame during his lifetime.

On November 19, 2017, Harris underwent life-saving emergency surgery to clear fluid from around his heart and lungs at a hospital in Oxford, Mississippi. He was then on life support due to complications. The next day, his stepdaughter said he showed signs of improvement, but remained on life support. On November 22, it was reported that he was able to breathe on his own yet was unable to talk and remained under intensive care.

== Death ==
On August 5, 2020, Harris tested positive for COVID-19 during the COVID-19 pandemic in Mississippi, and was hospitalized. He likely contracted it from one of his numerous weekly visits to the dialysis center, his wife said. Due to COVID-19, he started to experience complications from his diabetes. He went into cardiac arrest on August 9, 2020, dying later that afternoon at the age of 70.

Shortly after his death, a GoFundMe page was started to help Harris's family pay for his funeral expenses. The fundraiser ended up surpassing its original goal of $25,000, raising a total of $32,664. Impact Wrestling executive Scott D'Amore donated $2,500 to the cause and fellow wrestler Chris Jericho made a $5,000 donation. This was not the first time that Jericho had donated to a cause involving Harris – in April 2019, a GoFundMe was started by B. Brian Blair, former WWF wrestler and president of the Cauliflower Alley Club, to raise money to prevent Harris from losing his home due to unpaid taxes. Jericho donated $5,000 to this fundraiser as well, pushing the amount raised substantially past the stated goal of $12,750.

== Bibliography ==
- Kamala Speaks: The Official Autobiography of WWE Wrestler James "Kamala" Harris (January 17, 2015) – with Kenny Casanova

== Championships and accomplishments ==
- Continental Wrestling Association
  - AWA Southern Heavyweight Championship (1 time)
- Great Lakes Wrestling Association
  - GLWA Heavyweight Championship (1 time)
- International Championship Wrestling
  - ICW Southern Tag Team Championship (1 time) – with Billy Screaming Eagle
- International Wrestling Association
  - IWA United States Heavyweight Championship (1 time)
  - IWA Tag Team Championship (1 time) – with Buddy Wolfe
- Memphis Wrestling Hall of Fame
  - Class of 2022
- NWA Mississippi
  - NWA Mississippi Heavyweight Championship (1 time)
- NWA Tri-State
  - NWA United States Tag Team Championship (Tri-State version) (1 time) – with Oki Shikina
- Pro Wrestling Illustrated
  - PWI ranked him #144 of the 500 best singles wrestlers of the "PWI Years" in 2003.
- Southeastern Championship Wrestling
  - NWA Southeastern Heavyweight Championship (Northern Division) (1 time)
- Southeastern Xtreme Wrestling
  - SXW Hardcore Championship (1 time)
- Texas Wrestling Hall of Fame
  - Class of 2012
- United States Wrestling Association
  - USWA Unified World Heavyweight Championship (4 times)
- World Xtreme Wrestling
  - Hall of Fame (2013)
- WWE
  - WWE Hall of Fame (Class of 2025 - Legacy wing)
