= Parade of Champions =

Professional wrestling supercard promoted by WCCW

- Promotions: World Class Championship Wrestling
- First event: 1961
- Last event: 1988
- Event gimmick: Tribute to the deceased members of Von Erich family: David and Mike Von Erich

The Parade of Champions was a series of professional wrestling supercards promoted by Fritz Von Erich's World Class Championship Wrestling (WCCW), first in 1961, in 1972 and then annually from 1984 through 1988.

Von Erich used the "Parade of Champions" name in 1984 as a way to honor his recently deceased son, David and the subsequent Parade of Champions were all "Von Erich Memorial" Parades of Champions. At the inaugural Von Erich Memorial event, in front of the largest crowd ever to watch a pro wrestling event in the United States up to that point, Kerry Von Erich defeated Ric Flair for the NWA World Heavyweight Championship, only to lose it back to Flair 18 days later in Yokohama, Japan. Over the next few years, Von Erich altered the names as tragedy repeatedly struck his family.

The Parade of Champions was the most recognized event that WCCW, later known as World Class Wrestling Association, promoted. There was a Parade of Champions super card held by Southern Sports (precursor to WCCW) in 1961 and another held by Big Time Wrestling (the previous name of WCCW) in 1972. All Parade of Champions supercards were held at Texas Stadium in Irving, Texas. A wrestling organization out of Texas called NWA Southwest ran an event in late August, 2010, called Parade of Champions, which it claimed was the "Longest Running Wrestling Event In Texas History Dating Back To 1972," but there was no actual connection between the WCCW show event other than the name.

== Events ==
#	Event	Date	City	Venue	Main event
1	Parade of Champions (1961)	January 31, 1961	Dallas, Texas	Dallas Sportatorium	Pat O'Connor (c) vs. Dory Dixon in a two out of three falls match for the NWA World Heavyweight Championship
2	Parade of Champions (January 1963)	January 29, 1963	Dallas, Texas	Dallas Sportatorium	Lou Thesz (c) vs. Ray Gunkel in a two out of three falls match for the NWA World Heavyweight Championship
3	Parade of Champions (June 1963)	June 4, 1963	Dallas, Texas	Dallas Sportatorium	Lou Thesz (c) vs. Dory Dixon in a two out of three falls match for the NWA World Heavyweight Championship
4	Parade of Champions (1972)	June 24, 1972	Irving, Texas	Texas Stadium	Dory Funk, Jr. (c) vs. Fritz Von Erich for the NWA World Heavyweight Championship
5	Parade of Champions (1974)	March 26, 1974	Dallas, Texas	Memorial Auditorium	Jack Brisco (c) vs. Clay Spencer for the NWA World Heavyweight Championship
5	Parade of Champions (1974)	March 27, 1974	San Antonio, Texas	Municipal Auditorium	Jack Brisco (c) vs. Dory Funk Jr. for the NWA World Heavyweight Championship
6	1st Von Erich Memorial Parade of Champions	May 6, 1984	Irving, Texas	Texas Stadium	Ric Flair (c) vs. Kerry Von Erich for the NWA World Heavyweight Championship
7	2nd Von Erich Memorial Parade of Champions	May 5, 1985	Irving, Texas	Texas Stadium	Kerry Von Erich vs. One Man Gang in a Hair vs. One Man Gang facing Fritz Von Erich match
8	3rd Von Erich Memorial Parade of Champions	May 4, 1986	Irving, Texas	Texas Stadium	Fabulous Freebirds (Michael Hayes, Terry Gordy and Buddy Roberts) (c) vs. Steve Simpson, Kerry Von Erich and Lance Von Erich in a Lumberjack elimination match for the WCWA World Six-Man Tag Team Championship
9	4th Von Erich Memorial Parade of Champions	May 3, 1987	Irving, Texas	Texas Stadium	Six-woman Mud Pit match
10	5th Von Erich Memorial Parade of Champions	May 8, 1988	Irving, Texas	Texas Stadium	Iceman Parsons (c) vs. Kerry Von Erich for the WCWA World Heavyweight Championship
(c) – refers to the champion(s) heading into the match

== Show results ==
=== 1961 ===
Parade of Champions (1961)
- Promotion: Southwest Sports
- Date: January 31, 1961
- City: Dallas, Texas
- Venue: Dallas Sportatorium

Parade of Champions chronology
← Previous; First	Next → Parade of Champions

The first Parade of Champions was held on January 31, 1961 at the Dallas Sportatorium in Dallas, Texas. It was promoted by Southwest Sports, the predecessor to World Class Championship Wrestling. With a capacity crowd in attendance, the event celebrated Ed McLemore's 22nd anniversary promoting pro wrestling in Dallas and also served as a benefit show for the March of Dimes.

Five matches were contested at the event and each match featured a championship on the line. The main event was a two out of three falls match for the NWA World Heavyweight Championship, in which defending champion Pat O'Connor fought Dory Dixon to a ninety-minute time limit draw, thus retaining the title. In other title matches on the card, Danny Hodge retained the NWA World Junior Heavyweight Championship against Jerry Kozak with 2-0 score, Don Manoukian retained the NWA Texas Heavyweight Championship against Alex Perez in the first defense of the title in Dallas during the reign, Hogan Wharton and Pepper Gomez defeated Jet Monroe and Sputnik Monroe to retain the NWA Texas Tag Team Championship and "Wild" Bull Curry defeated Tosh Togo to retain the NWA Texas Brass Knuckles Championship.

Show results

No.	Results	Stipulations	Times
1	"Wild" Bull Curry (c) defeated Tosh Togo	Singles match for the NWA Texas Brass Knuckles Championship	—
2	Hogan Wharton and Pepper Gomez (c) defeated Jet Monroe and Sputnik Monroe	Tag team match for the NWA Texas Tag Team Championship	—
3	Don Manoukian (c) defeated Alex Perez	Singles match for the NWA Texas Heavyweight Championship	—
4	Danny Hodge (c) defeated Jerry Kozak 2-0	Two-out-of-three falls match for the NWA World Junior Heavyweight Championship	—
5	Pat O'Connor (c) vs. Dory Dixon ended in a draw	Two-out-of-three falls match for the NWA World Heavyweight Championship	90:00
(c) / – the champion(s) heading into the match

=== January 1963 ===
Parade of Champions (January 1963)
- Promotion: Southwest Sports
- Date: January 29, 1963
- City: Dallas, Texas
- Venue: Dallas Sportatorium

Parade of Champions chronology
← Previous; 1961	Next → June 1963

The second Parade of Champions was held on January 29, 1963 at the Dallas Sportatorium in Dallas, Texas. It marked the twenty-fourth anniversary of Ed McLemore promoting wrestling shows in Dallas.

Five championship matches were contested at the event including three title matches. The main event was a two out of three falls match for the NWA World Heavyweight Championship, in which defending champion Lou Thesz retained the title against Ray Gunkel via a double count-out at 1-1 score. Other title matches at the event saw "Wild" Bull Curry and Relampago Cubano beat Ivan the Terrible and Tony Borne to win the NWA World Tag Team Championship and Rip Hawk retain the NWA Texas Heavyweight Championship against Bill Dromo by losing via disqualification.

Show results

No.	Results	Stipulations
1	Dolly Darcel defeated Baby Cheryl	Singles match
2	Rock Hunter vs. Tarzan Tyler ended in a draw	Singles match
3	Bill Dromo defeated Rip Hawk (c) by disqualification	Singles match for the NWA Texas Heavyweight Championship
4	"Wild" Bull Curry and Relampago Cubano defeated Ivan the Terrible and Tony Borne (c)	Tag team match for the NWA World Tag Team Championship
5	Lou Thesz (c) vs. Ray Gunkel ended in a double count-out	Two-out-of-three falls match for the NWA World Heavyweight Championship
(c) / – the champion(s) heading into the match

=== June 1963 ===
Southwest Sports Parade of Champions
- Promotion: Southwest Sports
- Date: June 4, 1963
- City: Dallas, Texas
- Venue: Dallas Sportatorium

Parade of Champions chronology
← Previous; January 1963	Next → Big Time Wrestling Parade of Champions

The third Parade of Champions was promoted by Southwest Sports on June 4, 1963 at the Dallas Sportatorium in Dallas, Texas. It marked the first time that a Parade of Champions event was held twice a year.

The event featured six matches in total and was headlined by a two out of three falls match, in which Lou Thesz defeated Dory Dixon to retain the NWA World Heavyweight Championship. In other title matches on the undercard, The Kozak Brothers (Jerry Kozak and Nick Kozak) defeated Jack Donovan and Louie Tillet by disqualification to retain the NWA World Tag Team Championship, Bill Watts defeated Mark Lewin to retain the NWA Texas Heavyweight Championship and Penny Banner defeated Madame X to retain the NWA Texas Women's Championship.

Show results

No.	Results	Stipulations	Times
1	Johnny Weaver defeated Tony Borne	Singles match	—
2	Chuck Conley defeated Black Bart	Singles match	—
3	Penny Banner (c) defeated Madame X	Singles match for the NWA Texas Women's Championship	—
4	Bill Watts (c) defeated Mark Lewin	Singles match for the NWA Texas Heavyweight Championship	—
5	The Kozak Brothers (Jerry Kozak and Nick Kozak) (c) defeated Jack Donovan and Louie Tillet by disqualification	Tag team match for the NWA World Tag Team Championship	—
6	Lou Thesz (c) defeated Dory Dixon	Two-out-of-three falls match for the NWA World Heavyweight Championship	2:01
(c) / – the champion(s) heading into the match

=== 1972 ===
Big Time Wrestling Parade of Champions
- Promotion: Big Time Wrestling
- Date: June 24, 1972
- City: Irving, Texas
- Venue: Texas Stadium

Event chronology
← Previous; First	Next → Big Time Wrestling Parade of Champions

Parade of Champions chronology
← Previous; June 1963	Next → 1974

The fourth Parade of Champions event was promoted by Big Time Wrestling on June 24, 1972 at the Texas Stadium in Irving, Texas. It was the first Parade of Champions to be held under the Big Time Wrestling banner after Southwest Sports was rebranded in 1966.

The card featured eight championship matches. It was headlined by a NWA World Heavyweight Championship match between Dory Funk, Jr. and Fritz Von Erich. The match ended in a draw, meaning Funk retained the title. In other championship matches on the card, Stan Stasiak defeated Red Bastien to retain the NWA Texas Heavyweight Championship, Billy Red Lyons defeated The Spoiler to retain the NWA American Heavyweight Championship and Lord Littlebrook defeated Cowboy Lang to retain the NWA World Midget Championship. Another marquee matches on the card saw El Santo and Jose Lothario defeat Terry Funk and Mr. Fuji, and Bearcat Wright win a 7-man Roulette match.

Show results

No.	Results	Stipulations	Times
1	El Santo and Jose Lothario defeated Terry Funk and Mr. Fuji	Tag team match	—
2	George Scott vs. Tommy Seigler ended in a time-limit draw	Singles match	—
3	Lord Littlebrook (c) defeated Cowboy Lang	Singles match for the NWA World Midget Championship	—
4	Mil Máscaras defeated The Alaskan	Singles match	—
5	Bearcat Wright won	7-man Roulette match	—
6	Billy Red Lyons defeated The Spoiler (c)	Singles match for the NWA American Heavyweight Championship	—
7	Stan Stasiak defeated Red Bastien (c)	Singles match for the NWA Texas Heavyweight Championship	—
8	Dory Funk, Jr. (c) vs. Fritz Von Erich ended in a time-limit draw	Singles match for the NWA World Heavyweight Championship	60:00
(c) / – the champion(s) heading into the match

=== 1974 ===
Big Time Wrestling Parade of Champions
- Promotion: Big Time Wrestling
- Date: March 26–27, 1974
- City: Day 1: Dallas, Texas; Day 2: San Antonio, Texas
- Venue: Day 1: Memorial Auditorium; Day 2: Municipal Auditorium
- Attendance: 8,000 (Day 1)

Parade of Champions chronology
← Previous; 1972	Next → 1984

The 1974 Parade of Champions was a two-day event held on March 26 and March 27, 1974. The first event was held at the Memorial Auditorium in Dallas, Texas on March 26. The second event was held at the Municipal Auditorium in San Antonio, Texas on March 27.

The March 26 card featured a total of six matches. It was headlined by a NWA World Heavyweight Championship match, in which the defending champion Jack Brisco defeated Clay Spencer to retain the title. Another major championship match on the card saw The Texan defeat Fritz Von Erich to win the NWA American Heavyweight Championship.

Show results

No.	Results	Stipulations
1	Bob Orton Jr. defeated Jerry Oates	Singles match
2	Bull Ramos and Roger Kirby defeated Bob Roop and Doug Somers	Tag team match
3	Black Angus defeated Blackjack Lanza	Singles match
4	Ivan Putski vs. the Great Mephisto ended in a draw	Singles match
5	The Texan defeated Fritz Von Erich (c)	Singles match for the NWA American Heavyweight Championship
6	Jack Brisco (c) defeated Clay Spencer	Singles match for the NWA World Heavyweight Championship
(c) / – the champion(s) heading into the match

The March 27 show was headlined by another NWA Heavyweight Championship, in which Jack Brisco defended the title against Dory Funk Jr. The match ended in a draw which meant that Brisco retained the title. The card also featured participation from American Wrestling Association (AWA) as Nick Bockwinkel and Ray Stevens defeated Bob Orton Jr. and Jose Lothario to retain the AWA World Tag Team Championship. Another championship match on the card saw The Great Mephisto defend the NWA Texas Heavyweight Championship against Roger Kirby. Mephisto retained the title via a disqualification.

Show results

No.	Results	Stipulations
1	Bob Roop vs. Bull Ramos ended in a draw	Singles match
2	Roger Kirby defeated The Great Mephisto (c) by disqualification	Singles match for the NWA Texas Heavyweight Championship
3	Blackjack Lanza and the Texan defeated Black Angus and Ivan Putski	Tag team match
4	Nick Bockwinkel and Ray Stevens (c) defeated Bob Orton Jr. and Jose Lothario	Tag team match for the AWA World Tag Team Championship
5	Jack Brisco (c) vs. Dory Funk Jr. ended in a draw	Singles match for the NWA World Heavyweight Championship
(c) / – the champion(s) heading into the match

=== 1st Von Erich Memorial Parade of Champions ===
The David Von Erich Memorial Parade of Champions was held as a tribute show for David Von Erich, who suddenly died during a tour in Japan on February 10, 1984. Parade of Champions was promoted by Fritz Von Erich on May 6, 1984 at the Texas Stadium in Irving, Texas. It was the first Parade of Champions produced under the World Class Championship Wrestling (WCCW) banner after Big Time Wrestling had been renamed in 1982. The event drew a massive crowd of 32,123. It was the biggest crowd in the history of WCCW.

Eight professional wrestling matches were contested on the card and seven matches were televised. In the main event, Ric Flair defended the NWA World Heavyweight Championship against the deceased David's brother Kerry Von Erich, taking the title match that was originally planned for David Von Erich that same year. Kerry defeated Flair to win the title.

In other prominent matches on the card, Chris Adams and Sunshine defeated Jimmy Garvin and Precious in a mixed tag team match, Fritz Von Erich, Kevin Von Erich, and Mike Von Erich defeated Fabulous Freebirds (Buddy Roberts, Michael Hayes, and Terry Gordy) to win the WCCW World Six-Man Tag Team Championship, Rock & Soul (Buck Zumhofe and Iceman King Parsons) defeated The Super Destroyers (Super Destroyer #1 and Super Destroyer #2) to win the NWA American Tag Team Championship, and Kamala wrestled The Great Kabuki to a double disqualification.

The NWA World Heavyweight Championship match between Kerry Von Erich and Ric Flair was awarded the Match of the Year by Pro Wrestling Illustrated.

In 2013, WWE wrestler Cody Rhodes considered the NWA World Heavyweight Championship main event, a five-star classic match.

=== 2nd Von Erich Memorial Parade of Champions ===
The 2nd Von Erich Memorial Parade of Champions was held on May 5, 1985 at the Texas Stadium in Irving, Texas. It drew a crowd of 26,153.

Nine professional wrestling matches were contested at the card. The main event pitted Kerry Von Erich against One Man Gang. The match stipulated that if Von Erich won, Gang's manager Gary Hart would have his head shaved bald, but if Kerry lost, his father Fritz Von Erich would have to come out of retirement and face One Man Gang one-on-one. Kerry won the match and as a result, Fritz's head was shaved bald. Another major match at the event featured Ric Flair defending the NWA World Heavyweight Championship against Kevin Von Erich. The match ended in a double count-out, meaning Flair retained the title.

In an other prominent match on the card, The Von Erichs (Kerry Von Erich, Kevin Von Erich and Mike Von Erich) and Fabulous Freebirds (Michael Hayes, Terry Gordy and Buddy Roberts) defeat The Dynamic Duo (Chris Adams and Gino Hernandez), Rip Oliver, One Man Gang, Kamala and "Dr. Death" Steve Williams in a twelve-man tag team match, where the winning team would split $100,000 and the wrestler who eliminated the last wrestler won a brand new Lincoln Continental. Kevin Von Erich scored the win by pinning Steve Williams. Also at the event, The Fantastics (Bobby Fulton and Tommy Rogers) controversially defeated The Midnight Express (Bobby Eaton and Dennis Condrey) (with Jim Cornette) in a two-ring no disqualification match to win the vacant NWA American Tag Team Championship.

The event was praised by critics. One critic stated "From the world title match to the 12-man best of five match to the tag team title match, this show completely overshadowed last year’s event."

=== 3rd Von Erich Memorial Parade of Champions ===
The 3rd Von Erich Memorial Parade of Champions event was held on May 4, 1986 at the Texas Stadium in Irving, Texas. It was the first Parade of Champions promoted under the World Class Wrestling Association banner after WCCW separated from the National Wrestling Alliance in early 1986 and rebranded as WCWA. The card drew a crowd of 24,121.

Ten professional wrestling matches were contested at the event including eight televised matches. The main event was a lumberjack elimination match, in which Fabulous Freebirds (Michael Hayes, Terry Gordy and Buddy Roberts) defended the WCWA World Six-Man Tag Team Championship against Steve Simpson, Kerry Von Erich and Lance Von Erich. Simpson, Kerry and Lance won the match and the titles. In other prominent matches on the card, Rick Rude retained the WCWA World Heavyweight Championship against Bruiser Brody via a disqualification, Bruiser Brody defeated Terry Gordy in a barbed wire match and Brian Adias defeated Steve Regal to retain the WCWA Texas Heavyweight Championship.

=== 4th Von Erich Memorial Parade of Champions ===
The 4th Von Erich Memorial Parade of Champions event was held on May 3, 1987 at the Texas Stadium in Irving, Texas. Fritz Von Erich promoted it as a tribute show for his sons David Von Erich, who died in 1984, and Mike Von Erich, who committed suicide in 1987. It drew a crowd of 5,900, the record lowest attendance in Parade of Champions events.

Eleven professional wrestling matches were contested at the event. The main event was a six-woman Mud Pit match, won by Candi Divine. However, it was not included in the video. The televised main event saw Bruiser Brody defeat Jeep Swenson. In other prominent matches on the card, The Fantastics (Bobby Fulton and Tommy Rogers) and Steve Simpson defeated the Rock 'n' Roll RPMs (Mike Davis and Tommy Lane) and Eric Embry in a scaffold match and Kevin Von Erich retained the WCWA World Heavyweight Championship against Nord the Barbarian via a double count-out.

This event won the 1987 award for Most Disgusting Promotional Tactic from the Wrestling Observer Newsletter; the combination of Mike Von Erich's name attached to the event (his suicide had been less than a month before it) and use of stipulations such as a scaffold match and women's mud wrestling was seen as exploitative.

== External sources ==
- Parade of Champions Results at World Class Tribute
- WCCW Wrestling Cards at the Wrestling Information Archive
