= Kerry Von Erich =

American professional wrestler (1960–1993)

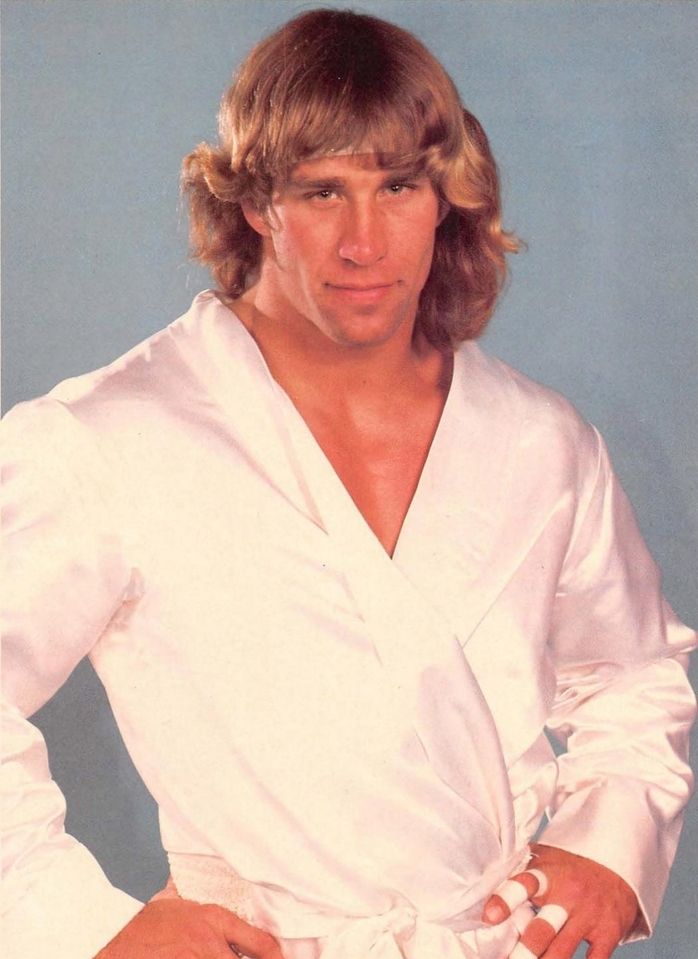
- Von Erich, c. 1987

Personal information
- Born: Kerry Gene Adkisson; February 3, 1960 Niagara Falls, New York, U.S.
- Died: February 18, 1993 (aged 33) Denton, Texas, U.S.
- Cause of death: Suicide by gunshot
- Spouse: Catherine Murray (m. 1983; div. 1992)
- Children: 2, including Lacey Von Erich
- Family: Von Erich

Professional wrestling career
- Ring name(s): Cosmic Cowboy No. 2 Kerry Von Erich; Texas Tornado
- Billed height: 6 ft 2 in (188 cm)
- Billed weight: 254 lb (115 kg)
- Billed from: Denton, Texas
- Trained by: Fritz Von Erich
- Debut: May 7, 1978

Kerry Gene Adkisson (February 3, 1960 – February 18, 1993), better known by his ring name Kerry Von Erich, was an American professional wrestler. He was part of the Von Erich family of professional wrestlers. He is best known for his time with his father's promotion World Class Championship Wrestling (WCCW), where he spent the first 11 years of his career, and his time in World Wrestling Federation (WWF), under the ring name Texas Tornado. Adkisson held forty championships in various promotions during his career. Among other accolades, he was a one-time NWA World's Heavyweight Champion, four-time WCWA World Heavyweight Champion, and one-time WWF Intercontinental Champion.

== Early life ==
Kerry was born on February 3, 1960, the son of wrestler and wrestling promoter Fritz Von Erich. His brothers, David, Kevin, Mike, and Chris, were also wrestlers. Kerry was also a standout in high school track and field and recorded a record-breaking discus throw. Later during his tenure in the WWE, his finishing move would be a spinning discus punch. He trained to compete in the 1980 Summer Olympics, but was unable to attend because of the boycott imposed by U.S. President Jimmy Carter.

== Professional wrestling career ==
=== World Class Championship Wrestling (1978–1989) ===
==== Debut (1978–1979) ====
Von Erich debuted in his father's professional wrestling promotion, Big Time Wrestling on May 7, 1978, against Paul Perschmann. In Big Time Wrestling, he held many Texas Tag Team and American Tag Team titles.

In 1980, Von Erich defeated Gino Hernandez for the vacant NWA American Heavyweight Championship. He lost the title to Ken Patera before winning his second NWA American Heavyweight Championship from The Masked Superstar. In May and June 1981, Kerry exchanged the NWA American Heavyweight Championship with Ernie Ladd. On October 25, he teamed with Terry Orndorff and they defeated The Great Kabuki and Chan Chung to win the NWA American Tag Team Championship. After having short angles as a singles wrestler, he began teaming with his brother Kevin. On March 15, 1982, the two brothers wrestled Gary Hart and King Kong Bundy to a double disqualification. On June 4, Von Erich defeated former NWA World Heavyweight Champion Harley Race, elevating him to main event status.

Kerry started feuding with the NWA World Heavyweight Champion Ric Flair. On August 15, he got his first shot at the NWA title against Flair in a two out of three falls match, which Flair won to retain the title. On December 25, Kerry got his next title shot against Flair in a no disqualification steel cage match, with Michael "P.S." Hayes, as the special guest referee. The Fabulous Freebirds helped Kerry to win the match, but he refused to take their help and said that he didn't want to win by cheating. In response, Terry Gordy slammed the cage door on Kerry's head, which led to Flair winning the match and retaining the title. This kicked off a historic feud between the Von Erichs and the Freebirds that lasted for over five years.

==== Feud with the Fabulous Freebirds; NWA World Heavyweight Champion (1983–1984) ====
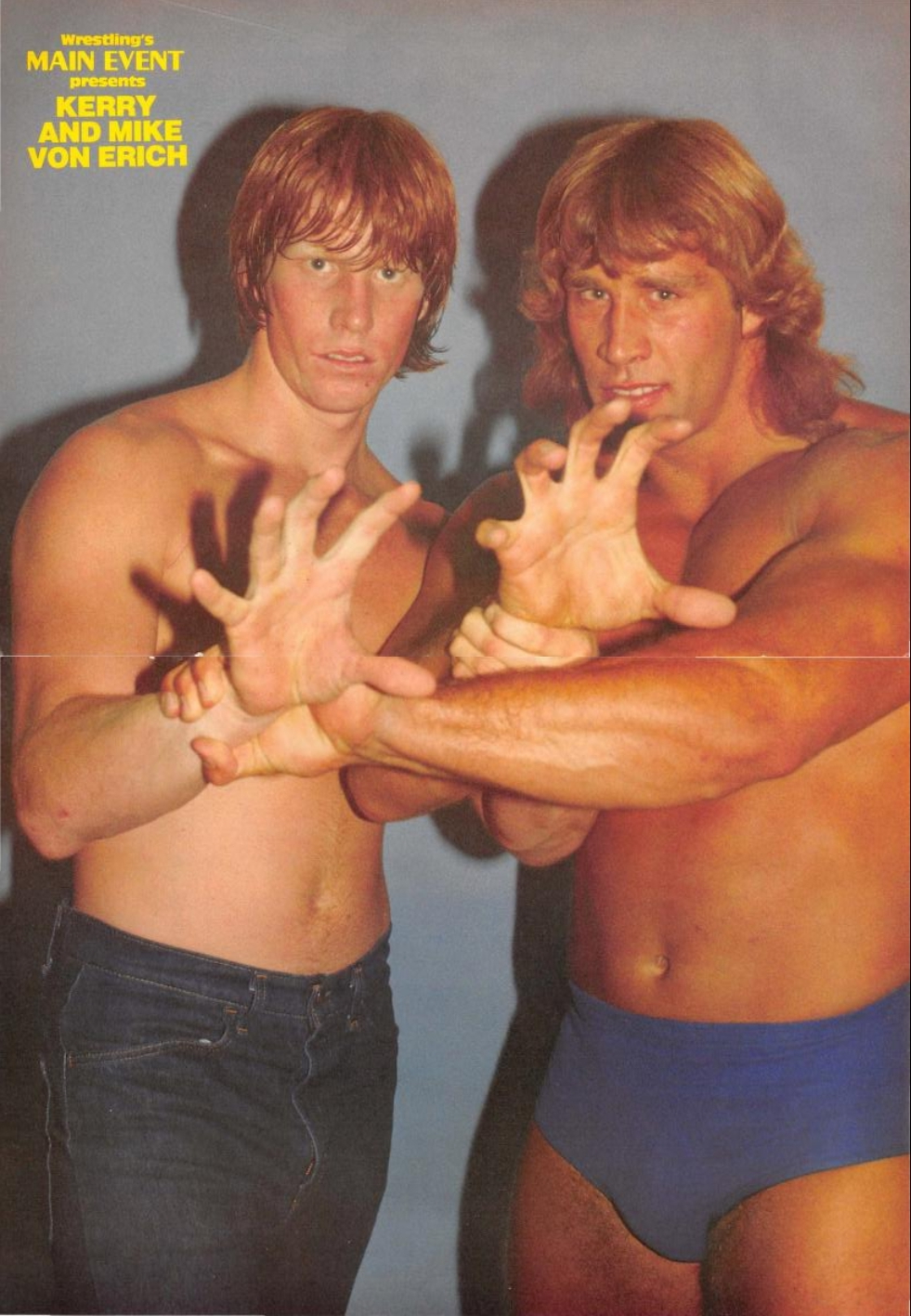
Kerry Von Erich alongside his brother Mike in 1984

On June 17, 1983, Von Erich teamed with Bruiser Brody to defeat the Fabulous Freebirds for the NWA American Tag Team Championship. On July 4, Kerry and his elder brothers Kevin and David defeated the Fabulous Freebirds in a two out of three falls match to win the NWA Texas Six-Man Tag Team Championship. They lost the titles back to the Freebirds on August 12. On September 5, the brothers took on the Fabulous Freebirds in a rematch for the titles; the Freebirds retained their titles by pinning Kerry. On November 24, Kerry defeated Michael Hayes in a loser leaves Texas steel cage match.

On December 2, the Von Erichs defeated the Freebirds for their second NWA Six-Man Tag Team Championship. On December 25, Kerry defeated Kamala by disqualification. On January 30, 1984, he teamed up with his brothers Mike and David against the Fabulous Freebirds in a six-man tag team match, which the Von Erichs lost by disqualification.

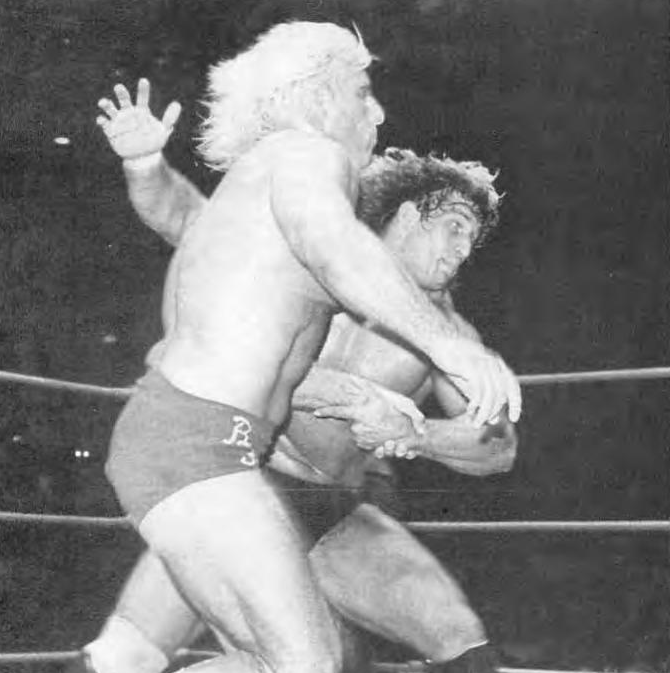
Kerry (back) Irish whips Ric Flair (front), on May 6, 1984

Kerry's biggest career highlight was at the 1st Von Erich Memorial Parade of Champions on May 6, 1984, when he beat the "Nature Boy" Ric Flair in a historic match, in front of over 45,000 fans at Texas Stadium to win the NWA World Heavyweight Championship. Kerry's victory was a tribute to his brother David, who had died three months earlier and for whom the event, the David Von Erich Memorial Parade of Champions, was named. He lost the belt 18 days later in Yokosuka, Japan, back to Flair in a bout that was marred by controversy: Von Erich's feet were on the bottom rope following a reversed rollup, but the referee ignored this and made the count. Kerry has the 12th shortest NWA World title reign in history. According to Ric Flair, Kerry lost the belt because he 'no showed' at least one night and possibly two, and thus Flair was told by an NWA official to get to Japan because he was getting the belt back. Apparently, Kerry was becoming unreliable and thus why he was allowed a short reign only. Kerry was told to drop the belt to Flair before the Night of Champions encounter on May 29 between Flair and Ricky Steamboat.

On July 4, the Von Erichs lost the six-man tag title to the Fabulous Freebirds. The title was held up due to the Freebirds winning after interference by Killer Khan. On September 3, they defeated the Freebirds in a handicap steel cage Loser Leaves Texas match for his fourth six-man tag title reign.

==== Later feuds (1984–1989) ====
After ending their rivalry with the Fabulous Freebirds, Von Erich brothers next feuded with Gino Hernandez, Chris Adams, and Jake Roberts. Kerry's angle with Adams was born out of Adams' angle with his brother Kevin, which began on September 28, 1984 (when Adams turned heel against Kevin following a tag team loss). To remain on kayfabe terms, Adams and Kerry wrestled as a tag team two days later in San Antonio, since the heel turn had not aired on television yet. On October 27, 1984, Hernandez, Adams, and Roberts defeated the Von Erichs to win the Six Man Tag Title in a match that saw Bobby Fulton substitute for an injured Kevin. On October 29, he defeated Gino Hernandez for his fifth NWA American Heavyweight Championship. On November 22, he teamed with Iceman Parsons to defeat Jake Roberts and Kelly Kiniski. He later refereed a Texas Deathmatch between longtime rival Terry Gordy and Killer Khan, which Gordy won, via Kerry's decision. On December 25, Kerry again got a shot at the NWA World Heavyweight Championship, a title he had lost many months ago. The champion Ric Flair intentionally got disqualified to retain the title. On December 31, the Von Erichs defeated Hernandez, Roberts, and Adams to regain their NWA Six-Man Tag Team Title.

During his last days in WCCW, Kerry Von Erich would be embroiled in a feud with Jerry "The King" Lawler (AWA World Heavyweight Champion) over who would be the Undisputed Heavyweight Champion. Kerry was then the WCWA (World Class Wrestling Association (World Class' final used name before the USWA days) Heavyweight Champion. They would meet at an interpromotional event, SuperClash III, to settle the dispute. Prior to this match, Kerry accidentally cut his arm causing it to bleed. During the match, he also received a cut to the head. When he later had Lawler in a clawhold on the mat with Lawler's shoulders down, the referee saw the blood on Kerry's head, thought it was excessive, and stopped the match. The crowd thought Kerry won by submission but instead "due to excessive bleeding" the referee stopped the match and awarded the decision and the WCWA Championship to Jerry Lawler. This would mark the end of Kerry's WCWA run.

=== Various promotions (1979–1988) ===
Von Erich worked for various promotions working for All Japan Pro Wrestling, New Japan Pro-Wrestling, UWF Mid-South, Championship Wrestling From Florida, and Central States Wrestling. In Florida in 1982, Kerry joined his brother David on the heel side. While David portrayed a loudmouth "spoiled rich kid" heel, Kerry's heel persona in the Florida territory was as a vain self-absorbed muscleman. He was in the St. Louis Wrestling Club from 1979 to 1985, where he once held the NWA Missouri Heavyweight Championship in 1983. Von Erich made his Madison Square Garden debut for World Wrestling Federation on March 24, 1980, defeating Jose Estrada. On September 28, 1985, Kerry made an appearance for American Wrestling Association's SuperClash defeating Jimmy Garvin to retain the NWA Texas Heavyweight Championship. In 1988 he went to Continental Wrestling Association in Tennessee where he feuded with Jerry Lawler.

=== United States Wrestling Association (1989–1990) ===
Kerry did continue to wrestle at the Dallas Sportatorium under the USWA banner, which acquired World Class in early 1989. He formed a tag team with Jeff Jarrett, winning the Tag Team Title with him. He also won the Texas heavyweight title twice. In 1990, Kerry feuded violently with Matt Borne, who turned heel during a ringside interview; during one match, the two battled outside the Sportatorium into the parking lot during a thunderstorm. Manager Percy Pringle also turned heel, and began feuding with Kerry. During the height of their angle, Kerry abruptly left the USWA/World Class and joined the WWF, leaving the Von Erich tradition to older brother Kevin (who was considered semi-active) and Chris. Honorary Von Erich "Gentleman" Chris Adams then became the Sportatorium's main headliner, feuding with Pringle, Steve Austin, and Jeanie Clarke. World Class withdrew from the USWA soon thereafter, but without Kerry, manager Gary Hart, and lack of television and revenues, World Class ceased operations three months later.

=== World Wrestling Federation (1990–1992) ===
==== Intercontinental Heavyweight Championship and various feuds (1990–1991) ====
In June 1990, Von Erich signed a contract with Vince McMahon's World Wrestling Federation (WWF). He debuted on the Saturday Night's Main Event XXVII as a fan favorite under the ring name Texas Tornado (while being openly acknowledged as Kerry Von Erich by announcers), defeating Buddy Rose, who coincidentally was his first opponent in his career. While WWF announcers didn't openly mention Kerry's past accomplishments, they did acknowledge that he was a veteran superstar who didn't have to prove anything to anyone. At SummerSlam, Tornado substituted for the injured Brutus Beefcake and defeated Mr. Perfect to win the WWF Intercontinental Championship. After he became champion, Tornado defended the title for three months, including a match against Haku on the October 13 Saturday Night's Main Event XXVIII before losing the title back to former champion Mr. Perfect in a rematch on the December 15 (taped November 19) edition of Superstars. Von Erich lost this match, and the title to Perfect due to interference from Ted DiBiase. Von Erich would go on to get revenge against Dibiase in a series of matches.

At Survivor Series in 1990, while still Intercontinental Champion, he wrestled in a Survivor Series match where he teamed with the WWF Champion Ultimate Warrior (formerly Dingo Warrior in World Class) and the Legion of Doom (Hawk and Animal). He was eliminated by long-time rival Mr. Perfect, but his team won the match.

At the Royal Rumble in 1991, he participated in the Royal Rumble match where he entered fifth and was eliminated by The Undertaker after lasting nearly half an hour. He made his only WrestleMania appearance at WrestleMania VII, defeating Dino Bravo following a Tornado Punch. Von Erich continued to be heavily pushed for the first half of 1991 and did not suffer another pinfall defeat until August 17, 1991, when he was defeated by The Warlord in Landover, MD. At SummerSlam, he teamed with the British Bulldog and Ricky Steamboat in a six-man tag team match to defeat the team of The Warlord and Power and Glory (Paul Roma and Hercules).

==== Final storylines and departure (1991–1992) ====
In October 1991, Von Erich renewed his old rivalry with Ric Flair, being among the first names to face him in the ring after the NWA World Champion joined the WWF that August. Flair defeated Von Erich multiple times during the WWF's October tour of the UK. The following month, "The Texas Tornado" suffered his first lopsided loss when he was squashed by The Undertaker in less than four minutes on the November 10, 1991, episode of Wrestling Challenge. At Survivor Series, he teamed with Sgt. Slaughter, Jim Duggan, and Tito Santana against Colonel Mustafa, The Berzerker, Skinner, and Hercules. He did not eliminate anyone, but his entire team survived. He made his last pay-per-view (PPV) appearance at the Royal Rumble in 1992; he participated in the Royal Rumble match for the vacant WWF World Heavyweight Championship. He was eliminated by the eventual winner Ric Flair, the man Von Erich beat eight years before for the NWA World Heavyweight Championship. Kerry's push continued to subside in early 1992. He was relegated to a house show feud with Skinner in which he came out victorious; in February he began a house show series with Rick Martel and was winless.

After an absence of two months following the real life breakdown of his marriage and subsequent divorce, Von Erich returned to action following WrestleMania VIII and defeated Marc Roberts on the April 18, 1992, episode of Superstars. However he now found himself as an opening card act programmed against low level competition like Barry Horowitz, Kato, and Skinner. While undefeated against them in multiple matches, Von Erich was unable to move back up into contention as he suffered several losses against Rick Martel, Nailz, and Kamala. Von Erich's final wrestling appearance on WWF TV was a loss to Shawn Michaels on the July 26, 1992, edition of WWF Prime Time Wrestling. Although Von Erich was announced to face Papa Shango at the SummerSlam PPV card in London, UK, he was replaced by El Matador and he officially left the WWF in August 1992.

=== Late career (1992–1993) ===
Von Erich returned to Texas and claimed the USWF Texas Heavyweight Championship, which he lost to Dynamite Dixon in November 1992. This was his final championship. He made an appearance for Eastern Championship Wrestling on January 23, 1993, at its Battle of the Belts event, wrestling Sal Bellomo to a double disqualification.

Von Erich returned to Dallas to compete in the Global Wrestling Federation (GWF), where he began teaming with former arch-rival Chris Adams. Von Erich's final match took place on February 12, 1993; it was a tag team match in the GWF at the Sportatorium on which Kerry and Chris Adams lost via disqualification to Johnny Mantell and Black Bart.

== Motorcycle accident and suicide ==
On June 4, 1986, Kerry was in a motorcycle accident that nearly ended his life. He suffered a dislocated hip and a badly injured right leg. Doctors were unable to save his right foot, eventually amputating it. According to his brother Kevin, Kerry reinjured the foot following surgery by attempting to walk on it prematurely during the night at the hospital to grab something to eat, thus forcing the doctors to amputate it. However, other accounts such as Bill Moody on his old website, said that it was on February 2, 1987, during the card of Wrestling Star Wars on the Tarrant County Convention Center in Fort Worth that his foot was reinjured instead; he was booked to wrestle too soon before healing against Brian Adias. Moody says Kerry turned up on crutches and was feeling too much pain, leading the doctors to inject a liquid-type numbing painkiller on his injured foot so he could go on. The match went under 6 minutes with Kerry beating Adias, but according to Moody, even with his foot under a painkiller influence, Kerry still felt a lot of pain, which led to the amputation of his foot. He continued wrestling after the accident with a prosthesis and kept the amputation secret to the majority of fans and fellow wrestlers, even going to the extreme of showering with his boots on. His amputation was kept secret from the public until after his death. However, Roddy Piper stated in his autobiography: "We were the best of friends. In fact, he felt comfortable enough to sit with me in a hotel and shoot the breeze with his prosthetic off".

After the amputation of his foot, Kerry became addicted to painkillers, followed by several drug problems. Among the many of them were two arrests, the first of which resulted in probation. One day after being indicted for the second charge, which likely would have resulted in extensive jail time (being a violation of his probation), Kerry ended his own life with a single gunshot to the heart with a .44 caliber pistol on February 18, 1993, on his father's ranch in Denton County, Texas, just 15 days after his 33rd birthday. He was found by his father Fritz, who stated that his last words to him were "Dad, I love you", before hugging him and going to the woods to take his own life.

Bret Hart states in his autobiography, My Real Life in the Cartoon World of Wrestling, that while he and Kerry were on the road to Fort Wayne, Indiana, on October 29, 1990, Kerry had told him that he had decided to join his late brothers in heaven, and was waiting for God to tell him when. Bret told Kerry that his living daughters would need him more than his late brothers. Kerry mostly convinced Bret that he had changed his mind, but Bret feared that it was only words. Kerry told Bret again in the summer of 1992 that he wanted to follow his three late brothers David, Mike and Chris (the latter two of whom had died through suicide), and that they were calling him. Kerry's marriage had fallen apart earlier in 1992 and according to Hart, Kerry believed that his death was imminent.

=== Posthumous induction in WWE Hall of Fame (2009) ===
On March 16, 2009, WWE.com announced that the Von Erich family would be inducted into the 2009 class of the WWE Hall of Fame by long-time rival, Michael Hayes. The family members inducted were Fritz, Kevin, David, Kerry, Mike, and Chris Von Erich. Kevin received rings for his father, Fritz, as well as each of his brothers. WWE made two Hall of Fame rings with Kerry Von Erich's name inscribed on the interior which were presented by Kevin Von Erich to Kerry's daughters, Hollie and Lacey, attending with their mother Cathy (Kerry's ex-wife). The event was held close to the Von Erichs' home at the Toyota Center in Houston, Texas, on April 4, 2009.

== In other media ==
Kerry Von Erich posthumously appears in Dark Side of the Ring (season 1 episode 4) and the video games Legends of Wrestling, Legends of Wrestling II, Showdown: Legends of Wrestling, WWE 2K17, and WWE 2K18. He appeared briefly as a prisoner in Problem Child.

He is portrayed by Jeremy Allen White in the A24 movie The Iron Claw, based on the life of Kerry and The Von Erich family.

== Personal life ==
Kerry was married on June 18, 1983, to Catherine M. Murray. They had two daughters, Hollie Brooke (born September 19, 1984) and Lacey Dawn (born July 17, 1986). Lacey wrestled for several years, most notably with TNA as Lacey Von Erich, before leaving the wrestling business in 2010. Kerry and Catherine divorced on April 22, 1992.

== Championships and accomplishments ==
Von Erich as WCWA World Heavyweight Champion in 1988

- Memphis Wrestling Hall of Fame
  - Class of 2022
- NWA Big Time Wrestling / World Class Championship Wrestling / World Class Wrestling Association
  - NWA American Heavyweight Championship (5 times)
  - NWA American Tag Team Championship (6 times) – with Bruiser Brody (3), Kevin Von Erich (2), and Al Madril (1)
  - NWA Texas Heavyweight Championship (3 times)
  - NWA Texas Tag Team Championship (3 times) – with Bruiser Brody (1), Skip Young (1), and Tiger Conway Jr. (1)
  - NWA World Heavyweight Championship (1 time)
  - NWA World Six-Man Tag Team Championship (Texas version) (6 times) – with David and Kevin Von Erich (2), Kevin and Mike Von Erich (3), Kevin Von Erich and Brian Adias (1), Lance and Kevin Von Erich (1), Kevin Von Erich and Michael Hayes (1)
  - NWA World Tag Team Championship (Texas version) (3 times) – with Al Madril (1) and Terry Orndorff (2)
  - WCWA World Heavyweight Championship (4 times)
  - WCWA World Six-Man Tag Team Championship (2 times) – with Kevin Von Erich and Lance Von Erich (1), Kevin Von Erich and Michael Hayes (1)
  - WCWA World Tag Team Championship (4 times) – with Kevin Von Erich (3) and Jeff Jarrett (1)
- Pro Wrestling Illustrated
  - PWI Match of the Year (1984) vs. Ric Flair at Parade of Champions 1 on May 6
  - PWI Most Popular Wrestler of the Year (1984)
  - PWI ranked him #40 of the top 500 singles wrestlers in the PWI 500 in 1991
  - PWI ranked him #24 of the top 500 singles wrestlers of the "PWI Years" in 2003
  - PWI ranked him #23 of the top 100 tag teams of the "PWI Years" with David, Mike, and Kevin Von Erich in 2003
- St. Louis Wrestling Club
  - NWA Missouri Heavyweight Championship (1 time)
- St. Louis Wrestling Hall of Fame
  - Class of 2016
- Texas Wrestling Federation
  - TWF Texas Heavyweight Championship (1 time)
- United States Wrestling Federation
  - USWF Texas Heavyweight Championship (1 time)
- World Wide Wrestling Alliance

- WWWA Heavyweight Championship (1 time)

- World Wrestling Federation / World Wrestling Entertainment
  - WWF Intercontinental Championship (1 time)
  - WWE Hall of Fame (Class of 2009)
- Wrestling Observer Newsletter
  - Match of the Year (1984) with Kevin and Mike Von Erich vs. the Fabulous Freebirds (Buddy Roberts, Michael Hayes, and Terry Gordy) in an Anything Goes match on July 4

== See also ==
- List of premature professional wrestling deaths
