= Sunshine (wrestling) =

Professional wrestling valet

- French, c. 1985

Personal information
- Born: Valerie French; April 29, 1962 (age 64) Tampa, Florida, U.S.
- Family: Jimmy Garvin (cousin)

Professional wrestling career
- Ring name: Sunshine
- Debut: 1982
- Retired: 1988

Valerie French (born 29 April 1960) is an American former professional wrestling valet, better known by the ring name Sunshine.

== Professional wrestling career ==
=== Championship Wrestling from Florida (1982) ===
Valerie French started in wrestling as the valet for her real-life cousin Jimmy Garvin in Championship Wrestling from Florida.

=== World Class Championship Wrestling (1983–1986) ===
French became a mainstay with World Class Championship Wrestling in 1983. She was called Sunshine and helped Garvin in his feud with David Von Erich. Garvin received some criticism for hiding behind Sunshine when he was in trouble. Sunshine was known for constantly interfering on Garvin's behalf. David Von Erich spanked her in the middle of the ring for this same reason. On July 4, 1983, Garvin lost a match to David where he and Sunshine had to be his servants for a day. David had them do various chores on his ranch and it was filmed as a vignette for World Class television.

Shortly after this, Garvin brought in his real-life wife, Precious, to replace Sunshine, and they feuded. Sunshine enlisted the help of Chris Adams to help her in this feud.

Sunshine managing The Great Kabuki

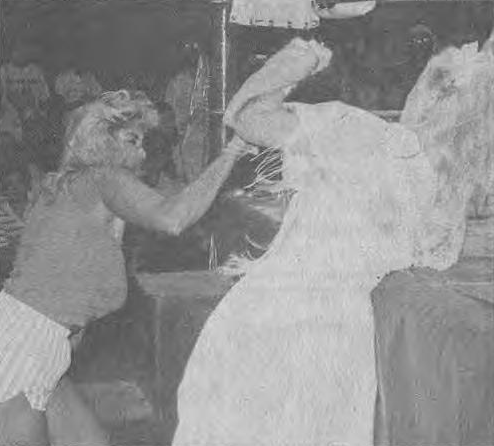
Missy Hyatt (left) punching Sunshine, c. 1986

In the summer of 1985, Sunshine had a brief feud against Jim Cornette that saw her pin him in a match where he was blindfolded and had one arm tied behind his back. By late 1985, she was feuding with Missy Hyatt, a valet for John Tatum. Sunshine enlisted Scott Casey and The Great Kabuki to help her. In October, Kabuki turned on her and Casey during a tag team match in which Kabuki teamed with The Missing Link against Casey and Iceman Parsons. Kabuki attacked Sunshine, causing The Missing Link to turn on him. The Missing Link was later involved in a similar angle where he was attacked by his former manager Percy Pringle and Rick Rude. Sunshine sprayed perfume in Rude's eyes and The Missing Link stopped Pringle from attacking her. She began managing him and continued her feud with Hyatt. The Sunshine-Hyatt feud culminated at the Parade of Champions on May 4, 1986, where Sunshine beat Hyatt in a pig-sty mud match. She then started a brief feud with Raven, which ended when Sunshine beat Raven in a mud wrestling match on July 4, 1986.

Sunshine managed Lance Von Erich and reunited with Chris Adams in 1986, after Adams became babyface following a sixteen-month stint as a heel wrestler.

=== Universal Wrestling Federation and Wild West Wrestling (1986–1988) ===
She then left for the Universal Wrestling Federation where she managed The Fabulous Freebirds. As part of the federation, she and the Freebirds feuded with The Missing Link and Dark Journey.

She left the UWF for Wild West Wrestling where she managed the team of John Tatum & Jack Victory. She also went back to managing The Missing Link. She eventually returned to the UWF, but the company was in the process of being sold to Jim Crockett Promotions. She retired shortly afterwards.

== Personal life ==
She now lives in Tampa, Florida, is married and has a daughter.
