= The Iron Claw (film) =

2023 film by Sean Durkin

- Theatrical release poster
- Directed by: Sean Durkin
- Written by: Sean Durkin
- Produced by: Tessa Ross; Juliette Howell; Sean Durkin; Angus Lamont; Derrin Schlesinger
- Starring: Zac Efron; Jeremy Allen White; Harris Dickinson; Maura Tierney; Stanley Simons; Holt McCallany; Lily James
- Cinematography: Mátyás Erdély
- Edited by: Matthew Hannam
- Music by: Richard Reed Parry
- Production companies: BBC Film; House Productions; Access Entertainment
- Distributed by: A24 (United States); Lionsgate (United Kingdom)
- Release dates: November 8, 2023 (Dallas); December 22, 2023 (United States); February 9, 2024 (United Kingdom)
- Running time: 132 minutes
- Countries: United Kingdom; United States
- Language: English
- Budget: $15.9 million
- Box office: $45.2 million

The Iron Claw is a 2023 biographical sports drama film written and directed by Sean Durkin about the Von Erichs, a family of professional wrestlers beset by tragedy. The film depicts the struggles of wrestling company owner Fritz Von Erich's sons to achieve the success for which their father groomed them, from 1979 to the early 1990s.

The film stars Zac Efron as Kevin Von Erich alongside Jeremy Allen White, Harris Dickinson, Maura Tierney, Stanley Simons, Holt McCallany, and Lily James as other members of the family. The title comes from the "Iron Claw", a signature move of the Von Erichs, which takes on thematic resonance within the film.

The Iron Claw premiered at the Texas Theatre in Dallas on November 8, 2023. It was released in the United States by A24 on December 22, 2023, and by Lionsgate in the United Kingdom on February 9, 2024. It grossed over $45 million, on a $15.9 million budget, and received positive reviews, with the cast's performance receiving praise from critics. It was named one of the top 10 films of 2023 by the National Board of Review.

== Plot ==
In 1979, World Class Championship Wrestling (WCCW) is owned by retired professional wrestler Fritz Von Erich, who once dreamed of winning the NWA World Heavyweight Championship. Fritz has five sons with his wife Doris, from oldest to youngest: Jack Jr., who died as a child, Kevin and David, who both wrestle in WCCW, Kerry, an aspiring discus thrower, and Mike, an aspiring musician. Kevin, the current Texas Heavyweight Champion, starts a relationship with a woman named Pam and tells her about the "Von Erich curse" that killed Jack Jr. as a child, supposedly brought on by Fritz changing his last name from Adkisson to his mother's, whose family had suffered constant tragedy.

Kevin wins a non-title match against NWA World Heavyweight Champion Harley Race by disqualification, putting himself in the lead to challenge for the title. However, Fritz is disappointed that Kevin took a long time to get up after taking a vertical suplex directly on concrete, but is delighted by David displaying a natural talent for showmanship while cutting a promo. The boycott of the 1980 Summer Olympics in Moscow dashes Kerry's hopes of competing, and he moves back home, where Fritz also asks him to become a wrestler.

By 1983, Kevin, Kerry and David go over the Fabulous Freebirds to win the Six-Man Tag Team Championship, and Fritz volunteers David over Kevin to work current NWA World Heavyweight Champion Ric Flair. Kevin and Pam get married, and he reveals to an ill David at the wedding that he will soon be a father. A week before his match against Flair, David dies of enteritis while touring in Japan. Both Kevin and Kerry volunteer to work Flair in his place, but Fritz lets a coin flip decide, resulting in Kerry being the one to face Flair—going over him and winning the World Heavyweight Championship. Although Fritz is overjoyed, a drunk Kerry goes out for a motorcycle ride and loses his right foot in an accident.

Fearing the curse, Kevin has his newborn son, Ross, legally surnamed Adkisson. Kevin begins training Mike, who badly injures his shoulder during a match and goes into a toxic shock-induced coma during surgery. Mike narrowly emerges from his coma with noticeable brain damage and is no longer able to play the guitar, leading him to die by suicide. A grief-stricken Kevin starts to distance himself from Pam and Ross, fearing the "curse" will affect them too. Nonetheless, he works Flair for the NWA World Heavyweight Championship but is disqualified when he ignores the referee and grapples Flair with the signature Von Erich "Iron Claw" move for too long.

In 1990, Kerry returns to wrestling with a new prosthetic foot, under the name the Texas Tornado, where he works for the World Wrestling Federation (WWF, later WWE), now dwarfing WCCW in popularity, where he wins the WWF Intercontinental Championship at SummerSlam. Fritz gives the task of running the WCCW to Kevin, who focuses on life with Pam, Ross, and their newest son Marshall. Kerry gives Fritz a new gun for Christmas, but becomes upset when Fritz puts it away instead of firing it. Kerry later calls Kevin to tell him that the curse's constant presence and his declining career have made him consider suicide. He hangs up before Kevin can learn his location.

After calling Fritz for help, who refuses, Kevin arrives at Fritz's house the next morning just in time to hear Kerry took his own life with the gun and nearly strangles Fritz to death in a fit of rage. Sitting with Kerry's body, Kevin has a vision of his brothers in the afterlife: Kerry, now with his right foot back, leaves behind the coin that decided he would face Flair and reunites with Mike, now free to pursue his musical dreams, David wearing the world title belt he had been chasing in life, and Jack Jr., whom Kerry meets for the first time.

Sometime later, Kevin sells WCCW to Jerry Jarrett despite Fritz's protests, and Pam becomes pregnant again. Kevin cries while watching his sons play football, telling them he "used to be a brother". Kevin's sons promise to be brothers to him, and he gets up and plays with them.

A textual epilogue reveals that the Von Erichs were inducted into the WWE Hall of Fame in 2009 and that Kevin and Pam are still married and have bought a ranch in Hawaii, where their large family lives to this day, including their four children and thirteen grandchildren.

== Cast ==
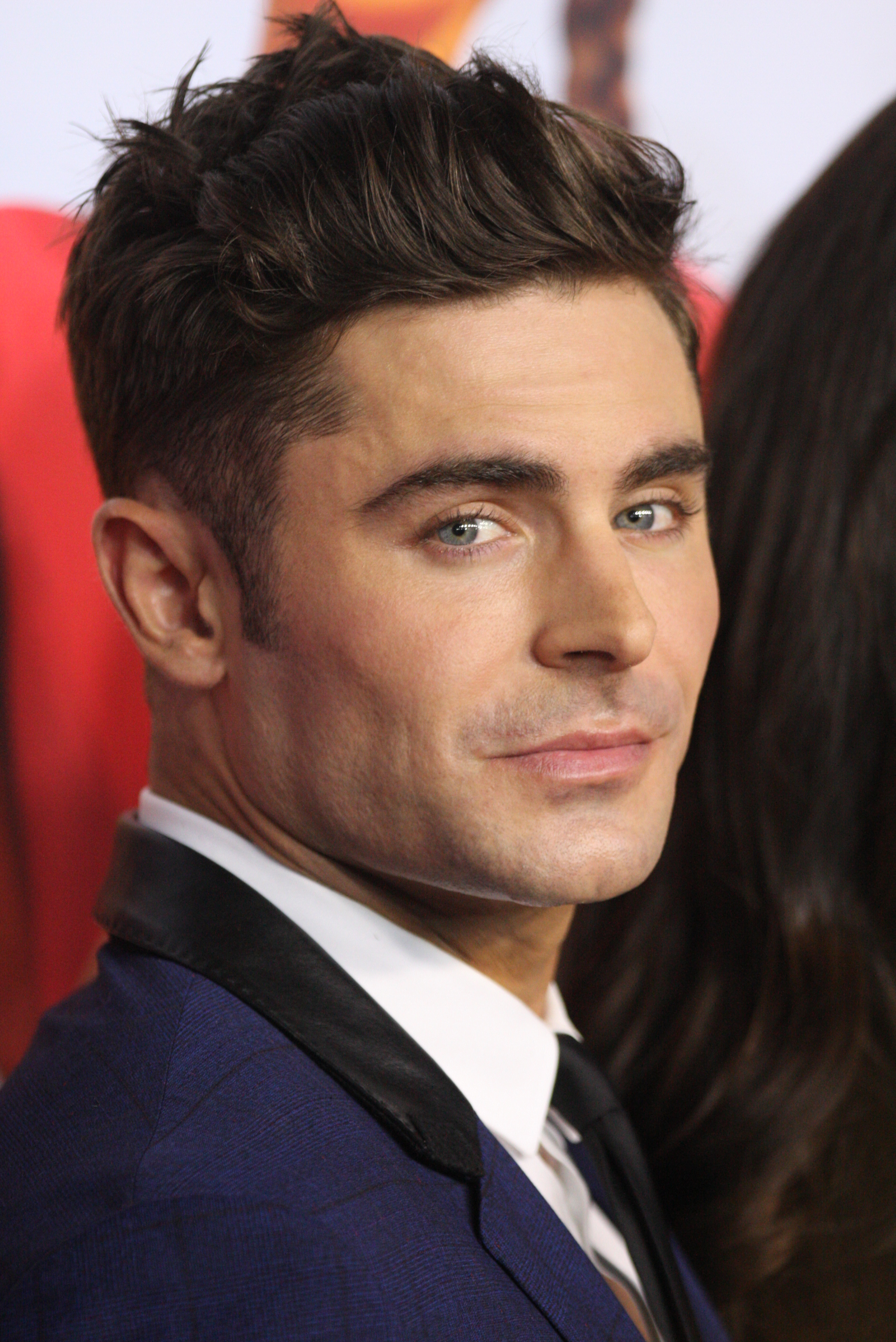
Zac Efron stars as

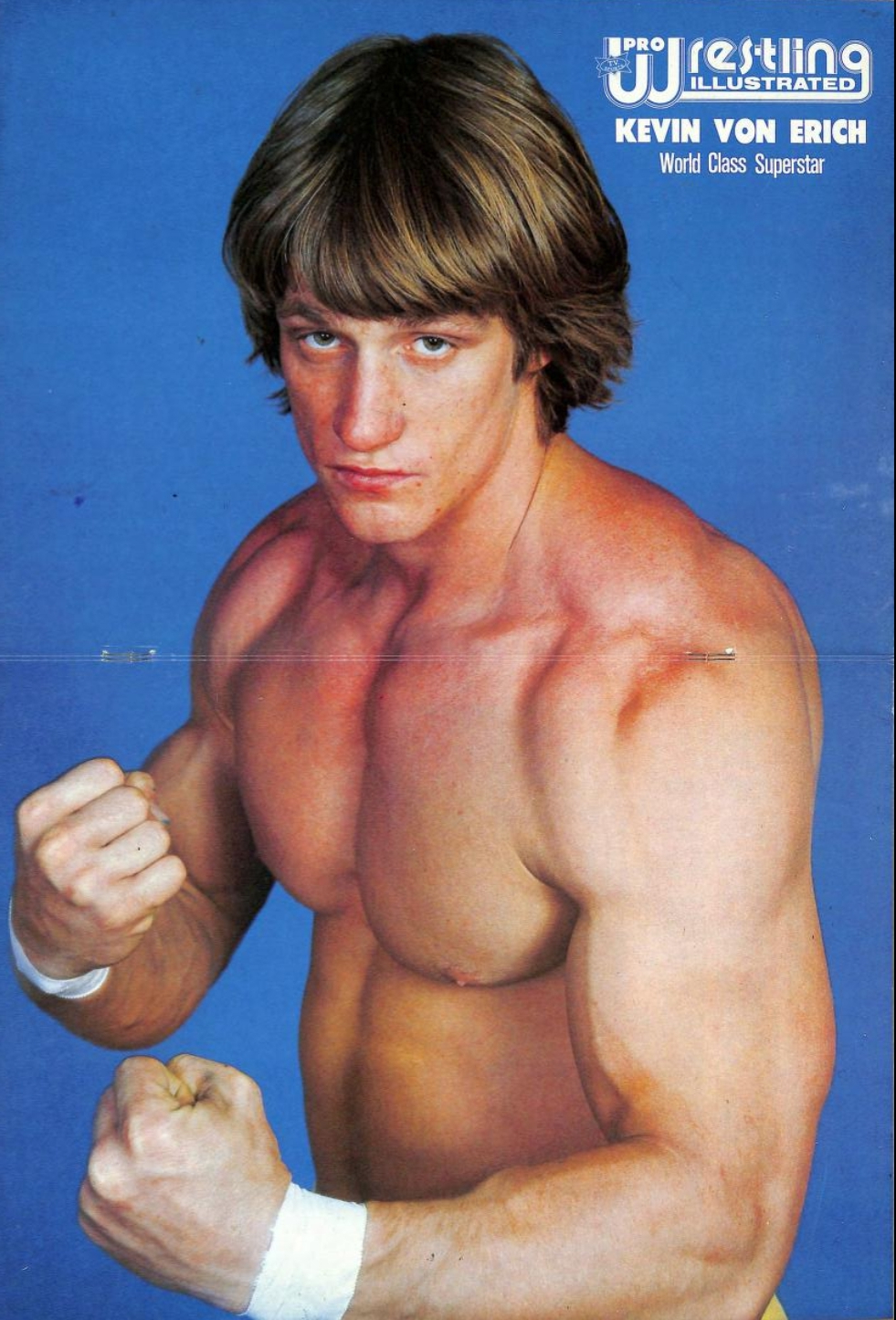
Kevin Von Erich

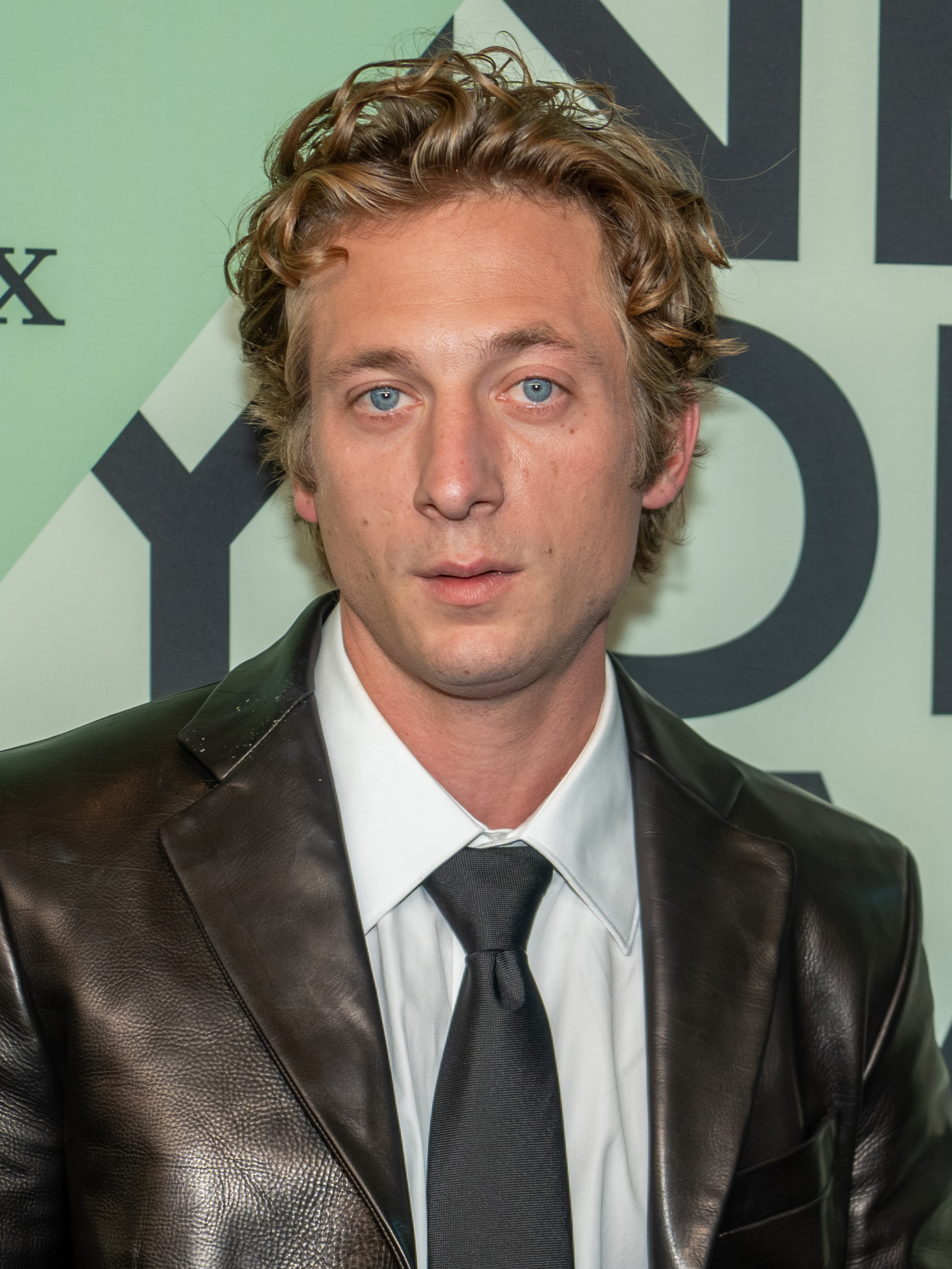
Jeremy Allen White stars as

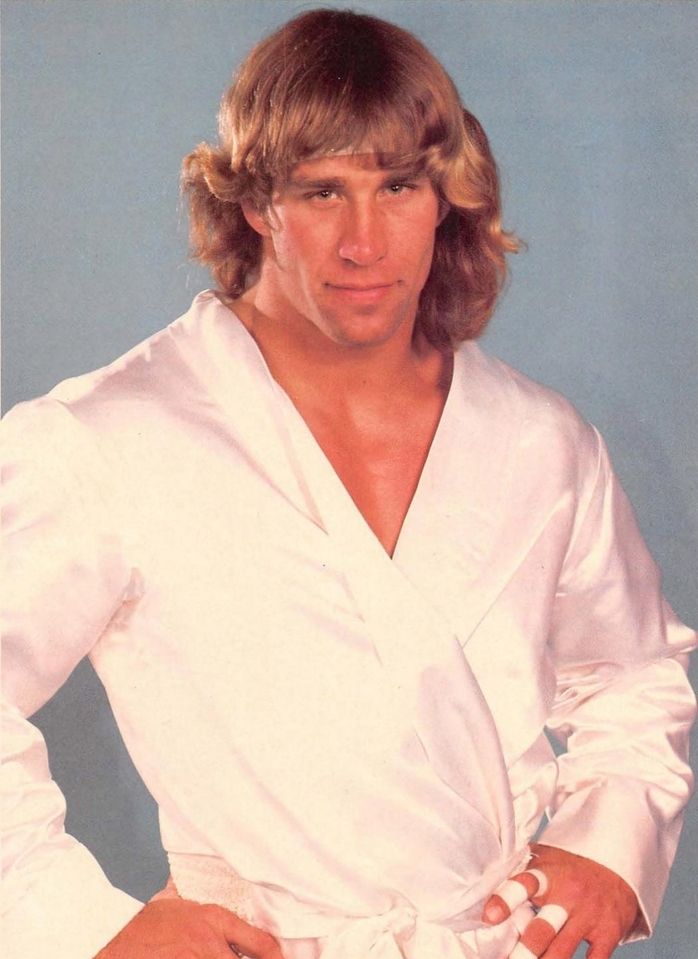
Kerry Von Erich

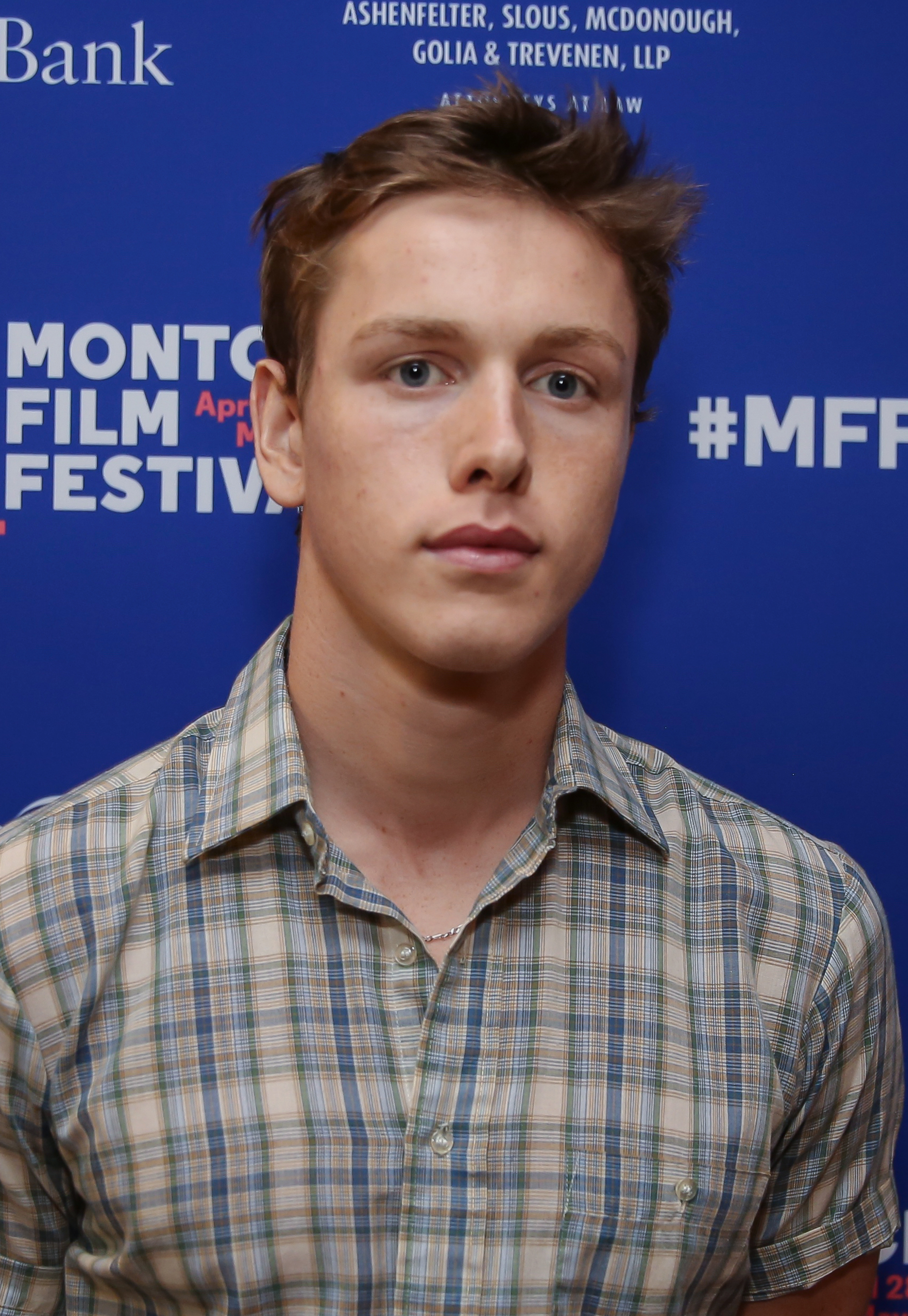
Harris Dickinson stars as

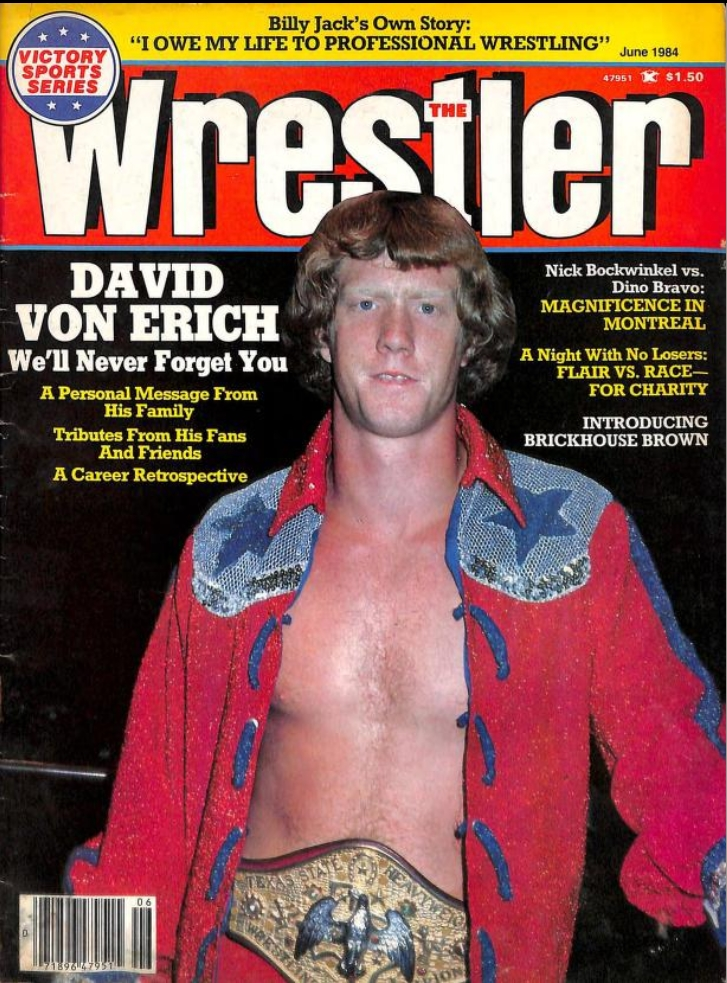
David Von Erich

- Zac Efron as Kevin Von Erich, the second-oldest son
  - Grady Wilson as Young Kevin
- Jeremy Allen White as Kerry Von Erich, the fourth-oldest son
- Harris Dickinson as David Von Erich, the third-oldest son
  - Valentine Newcomer as Young David
- Maura Tierney as Doris Von Erich, Fritz's wife and the mother of the Von Erich brothers
- Stanley Simons as Mike Von Erich, the youngest son (a composite character based on Mike and Chris Von Erich)
- Michael J. Harney as Bill Mercer, a professional wrestling commentator
- Holt McCallany as Jack "Fritz" Von Erich, the family patriarch, former wrestler, and WCCW owner
- Lily James as Pam Adkisson, Kevin's wife
- Maxwell Friedman as Lance Von Erich, a unrelated wrestler billed as a member of the family
- Brady Pierce (Note: Credited as Michael Proctor in the end credits) as Michael Hayes
- Aaron Dean Eisenberg as Ric Flair
- Kevin Anton as Harley Race
- Cazzey Louis Cereghino as Bruiser Brody
- Chavo Guerrero Jr. as The Sheik
- Ryan Nemeth as Gino Hernandez
- Scott Innes as the ring announcer

== Production ==
=== Development ===
Sean Durkin had a long-term aspiration to create a film based on the Von Erich family. He was a fan of professional wrestling during his youth, and he was personally saddened by the string of Von Erich family deaths. In 2015, he began research for the film's initial screenplay. Chris Von Erich, the youngest member of the family, was not included in the screenplay because, according to Durkin, "it was one more tragedy that the film couldn't really withstand". Chris died by suicide in 1991, a year and a half prior to Kerry Von Erich, and he was the fourth family death (after Jack Jr., David, and Mike). Elements of his life and suicide were added to Mike's character.

In June 2022, the film was announced to star Zac Efron and to be produced and distributed by A24. Later, it was also developed by House Productions, with the support of Access Entertainment and BBC Film. In September, Jeremy Allen White and Harris Dickinson were announced as joining the project to portray the Von Erich brothers, alongside Efron. One month later, Holt McCallany and Lily James were cast, and Juliette Howell, Angus Lamont, Maura Tierney, Tessa Ross, Derrin Schlesinger, and Harrison Huffman were confirmed as producers. In November, Maxwell Jacob Friedman was cast and was later credited as an executive producer.

=== Filming ===
Principal photography began in Baton Rouge, Louisiana in October 2022, and it lasted six weeks. Instead of filming the wrestling scenes in multiple edited sequences, however, the cast performed full-length, one-take wrestling matches, in front of a live audience, which was held in a furniture store that was converted to appear as the Dallas Sportatorium. Chavo Guerrero, who portrays The Sheik, also acted as the film's primary wrestling consultant. Guerrero also spoke to the cast about premature deaths in professional wrestling, including that of his uncle, Eddie Guerrero.

The film received special dispensation from SAG-AFTRA, to continue production and promotion during the 2023 SAG-AFTRA strike, subject to the acceptance of certain conditions and stemming from A24's positive relationship with the union.

=== Music ===
Richard Reed Parry of Arcade Fire composed the film's score. Parry and Laurel Sprengelmeyer also wrote an original song for the film, "Live That Way Forever".

Additionally, the film features songs such as "Don't Do Me Like That" by Tom Petty And The Heartbreakers, "(Don't Fear) The Reaper" by Blue Öyster Cult, "Thank God I'm a Country Boy" by John Denver, and "Tom Sawyer" by Rush. "Tom Sawyer", which served as Kerry Von Erich's entrance music from 1981 to 1983, was also featured in the marketing for the film.

== Release ==
The Iron Claw premiered at the Texas Theatre in Dallas on November 8, 2023, hours after the end of the 2023 SAG-AFTRA strike; and it was attended by Kevin Von Erich, who had recently returned to Texas after moving to Hawaii more than 20 years earlier, alongside Bill Mercer, Marshall Von Erich, Ross Von Erich, and Trish Stratus. The film was released, in the United States, on December 22 by A24, and premiered in the United Kingdom by Lionsgate on February 9, 2024.

The film was released for digital platforms on February 13, 2024, and for Blu-ray and DVD on March 26, 2024.

== Reception ==
=== Box office ===
The Iron Claw grossed $35 million in the United States and Canada and $10.1 million in other territories for a worldwide total of $45.2 million.

In the United States and Canada, The Iron Claw was released alongside Migration, Aquaman and the Lost Kingdom, and Anyone but You, and was projected to gross around $6 million from 2,774 theaters in its four-day opening weekend. The film made $2.5 million on its first day, including $640,000 from Thursday night previews. It went on to debut to $4.9 million, finishing sixth at the box office. In its second weekend the film made $4.6 million, finishing seventh at the box office. The following weekend it made $4.5 million, a drop of just 3% and finishing eighth.

=== Critical response ===
On the review aggregator website Rotten Tomatoes, 89% of 275 critics' reviews are positive, with an average rating of 7.7/10. The website's consensus reads: "Powerfully acted and profoundly sad, The Iron Claw honors its fact-based story with a dramatization whose compassionate exploration of family ties is just as hard-hitting as its action in the wrestling ring." Metacritic, which uses a weighted average, assigned the film a score of 73 out of 100, based on 55 critics, indicating "generally favorable" reviews. Audiences polled by CinemaScore gave the film an average grade of "A–" on an A+ to F scale, the best ever for an A24 title, while PostTrak reported 91% of filmgoers gave it positive score, with 72% saying they would definitely recommend the film.

The New Yorker's Richard Brody wrote The Iron Claw "is as exuberant as it is mournful, and the high spirits of performance and achievement are inseparable from the price that they exact". Adam Nayman of The Ringer called it "a sports movie with genuine existential heft", and The Atlantic's David Sims commented "it is the kind of big, weepy, macho film that just doesn't get made much anymore, a soaring power ballad that should prompt a lot of loud sniffling in the theater." David Fear of Rolling Stone noted the film establishes from the outset that "the physical violence in the ring will be nothing compared to the psychological carnage happening outside of it".

The cast received widespread praise. David Fear of Rolling Stone wrote of Efron's performance: "The lost, needy look in his eyes, especially when he's around his father, makes him seem like a frightened lad playing adult dress-up...Efron gets at what drove Kevin: discipline, love, and fear. He anchors the movie". Of White, Fear added, "The Bear has already sold many folks on the fact White is not only a hell of an actor, but can do a lot with silences, pauses, those peepers, and a kind of simmering soulfulness. This movie should convince whatever few naysayers are left that he's the real deal."

David Sims commented, "To wrestling nerds, the Von Erichs have a titanic legacy, and Durkin does his best to represent that by exploring the sport's crunchy, amateurish pre-corporate age, when regional live events were the big moneymakers and television was largely ignored." Writing for RogerEbert.com, Christy Lemire said "the sequence in which the Von Erichs discover the song that would become their anthem—the iconic 'Tom Sawyer'—is a montage that moves with a verve that's reminiscent of Scorsese's muscularity".

David Fear noted "there are times when the movie comes close to being an outright feel-bad sports movie". Several critics discussed the film's tendency to focus on the tragic, and expressed that character detail and depth are unfortunately sacrificed in favor of covering more narrative ground. Allison Willmore of Vulture wrote, "In streamlining their story to emphasize the tragedies that accrue as time goes on, the film risks reducing its characters into martyrs who suffer and die on behalf of toxic masculinity." The New York Times' Manohla Dargis opined: "The iron claw of corrosive patriarchy, as it were, and of emotional repression and misplaced ambition proves more than [Durkin] wants to grapple with." Richard Lawson of Vanity Fair said, "When the bad stuff does start happening—and then happens, again and again—it's hard to grasp the central why of it all. Why is this family so doomed, so pained, so self-destructive and unhappy?"

Writing for Texas Monthly, Sean O'Neal said, "The film sparks most in those early scenes set against the nostalgic neon glow of the eighties Dallas skyline, when the Von Erichs—and the city that surrounded them—seemed invincible and electric. Selfishly, I found myself wishing it could have lingered there a bit longer, before that golden myth gave way to gray and murky reality." Adam Nayman concluded, "It may be that by finally torquing a story about unimaginable loss into that of a mind who finds himself, The Iron Claw errs on the side of uplift. But as acted by Efron, the catharsis feels earned—the euphoric feeling of having broken out of a deathlock, even if only momentarily."

=== Reaction within professional wrestling ===
In October 2023, Marshall Von Erich, Kevin's son, praised Guerrero's role as a wrestling consultant, highlighting the accuracy of the film's wrestling sequences and complimenting Efron's performance. Kevin Von Erich also positively highlighted Guerrero's contributions, stating, "He did a great job, pushing [the cast] and getting them ready. It is a lot more difficult than it looks, and they did so well." Von Erich met Efron and endorsed both his portrayal and the overall film, which Efron later stated was "the most important review". Von Erich stated that his niece Hollie, Kerry's daughter, was moved when she saw McCallany, who plays her late grandfather Fritz, on set, but believed the film inaccurately portrays Fritz as coming off "pretty rank".

Wrestling journalist Dave Meltzer, who lived and worked in Texas during the events of the film, lauded the performances of the film's cast but noted the film's plot contained several historical inaccuracies and depicted many events in an incorrect chronology. Meltzer also opined that the film struggled to correctly depict the Von Erichs' mass popularity at their height. Additionally, Meltzer noted that some members of the professional wrestling community heavily criticized the exclusion of Chris Von Erich from the film, but agreed that the inclusion of Chris would have prolonged the length of the film greatly. Meltzer panned Aaron Dean Eisenberg's imitation of Ric Flair, suggesting that it was the weakest aspect of the film.

=== Accolades ===
Award / Film Festival	Date of ceremony	Category	Recipient(s)	Result	Ref.
Austin Film Critics Association Awards	January 10, 2024	Best Film	The Iron Claw	7th place	
Austin Film Critics Association Awards	January 10, 2024	Best Stunt Coordinator	Chavo Guerrero Jr.	Nominated	
Houston Film Critics Society Awards	January 22, 2024	Best Ensemble Cast	The Iron Claw	Nominated	
Houston Film Critics Society Awards	January 22, 2024	Best Stunt Coordination Team	The Iron Claw	Nominated	
National Board of Review	December 6, 2023	Top Ten Films	The Iron Claw	Won	
National Board of Review	December 6, 2023	Best Ensemble	The Iron Claw	Won	
San Diego Film Critics Society	December 19, 2023	Best Actor	Zac Efron	Nominated	
Seattle Film Critics Society Awards	January 8, 2024	Best Action Choreography	Hiro Koda	Nominated	
St. Louis Film Critics Association	December 17, 2023	Best Stunts	Chavo Guerrero Jr.	Nominated	
Minnesota Film Critics Alliance	February 4, 2024	Best Ensemble	The Iron Claw	Runner-Up	

== See also ==
- The Wrestler – Sports drama centered around professional wrestling.
- Fighting with My Family – Comedy-drama based on the early life and career of professional wrestler Saraya Bevis.
- The Smashing Machine – Biographical sports drama based on the life and career of former wrestler and mixed martial artist Mark Kerr.
