= Chris Von Erich =

American professional wrestler (1969–1991)

Personal information
- Born: Christopher Barton Adkisson; September 30, 1969 Dallas, Texas, U.S.
- Died: September 12, 1991 (aged 21) Denton, Texas, U.S.
- Cause of death: Suicide by gunshot
- Family: Von Erich

Professional wrestling career
- Ring name: Chris Von Erich
- Billed height: 5 ft 5 in (1.65 m)
- Billed weight: 175 lb (79 kg)
- Billed from: Denton, Texas
- Trained by: Fritz Von Erich
- Debut: June 22, 1990

Christopher Barton Adkisson (September 30, 1969 – September 12, 1991) was an American professional wrestler, best known under the ring name Chris Von Erich of the Von Erich family.

== Early life ==
The smallest and youngest of the Von Erich family at 5'5" and 175 pounds, Chris aspired to be a wrestler. He was the youngest son of wrestler and wrestling promoter Fritz Von Erich. His brothers, Mike, David, Kerry and Kevin all had success as wrestlers. Chris grew up with his brothers on a ranch of 500 acres in Texas. He grew up working cameras and doing other odd jobs backstage for World Class Championship Wrestling (WCCW). He won his first amateur wrestling match at the age of six.

== Professional wrestling career ==
Chris had minor involvement in angles in the 1980s. He performed run-ins to aid his brothers against The Fabulous Freebirds. Then Chris appeared at ringside when Kerry Von Erich won the NWA World Championship in May 1984. Chris also smashed Buddy Roberts across the back with a chair, and tackled Gino Hernandez at the Cotton Bowl in 1985 while he was trying to escape from having his hair shaved off after a tag team loss at the hands of the Von Erichs.

Chris became a full-fledged wrestler in 1990. He had a small feud with Percy Pringle in the United States Wrestling Association (USWA) which was seen nationally on ESPN. Chris tagged with both his brother Kevin and longtime ally Chris Adams in several tag team matches against Pringle and Steve Austin; however, he would face only Pringle whenever he was in the ring and allow his more experienced partner (Kevin or Adams) to battle Austin. Despite a lack of athleticism, Chris was supported by fans, who often yelled "GO, CHRIS, GO!" during his matches. In one of his early matches, Matt Borne and Pringle faced off against Kerry and Kevin Von Erich. Chris, who was at ringside, was attacked by Borne and Pringle, ramming his head into the ring apron, causing him to have a headache that lasted for five days. His last known match was a victory over Todd Overbow on March 31, 1991, for WCCW in Davis, Oklahoma.

== Personal life ==
Chris had several health problems which limited his success as a wrestler. In addition to asthma, his bones were so brittle from taking prednisone that they would often break while performing simple wrestling maneuvers. After the 1987 suicide of brother Mike, Chris began to experience depression and drug issues. He was also frustrated by his inability to make headway as a wrestler due to his slight physical build.

== Death and legacy ==
On September 12, 1991, at about 9 p.m., Chris was found by his brother Kevin and mother outside of their family farm in Edom, suffering from a self-inflicted 9mm gunshot wound to the head. According to Kevin, Chris came to him in the middle of the night, wanting back a videocassette recorder (VCR) Kevin borrowed from him. After noticing Chris sitting alone on top of a hill, Kevin went out and talked with him, where he revealed his suicidal tendencies concerning his condition (he had broken his arm earlier that month). After Kevin pleaded with him not to harm himself, Chris reassured him he would not, but after Kevin left, he shot himself in the head. He was hospitalized at East Texas Medical Center in Tyler shortly after 10 p.m., where he died 20 minutes after arriving, at age 21. Toxicology reports revealed cocaine and Valium were in his system at the time of his death. Kevin had talked to Chris earlier that day about 100–150 yards north of their home where an apparent suicide note had been left. His interment was at Grove Hill Memorial Park in Dallas. Chris' life story was combined with that of his brother Mike for the movie The Iron Claw (in which only Mike was mentioned by name).

== Awards and accomplishments ==
- World Wrestling Entertainment
  - WWE Hall of Fame (Class of 2009) as a member of the Von Erich family

== See also ==
- List of premature professional wrestling deaths
