= Harris Dickinson =

English actor (born 1996)

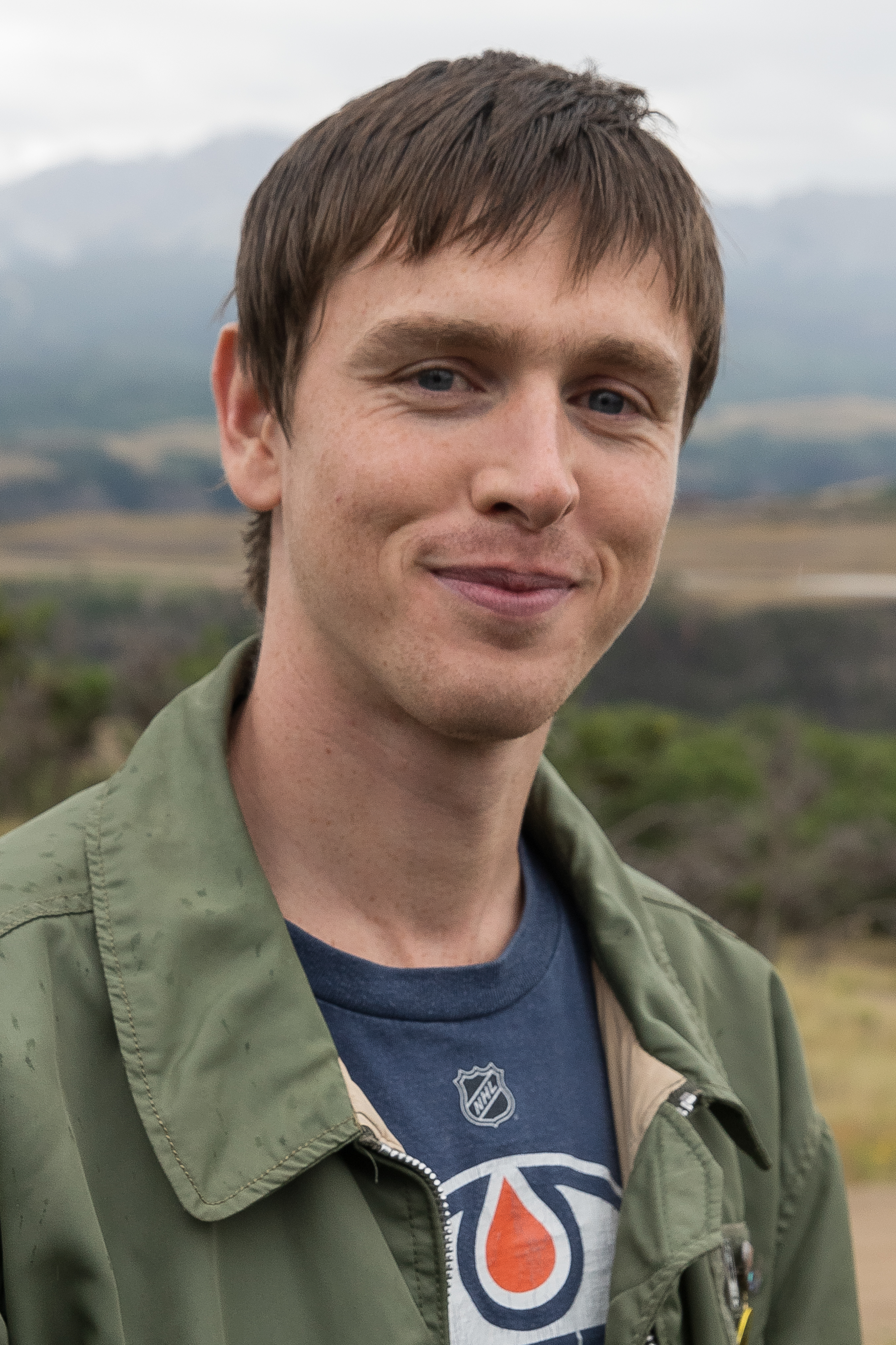
- Dickinson in 2025
- Born: 24 June 1996 (age 30); London, England
- Occupation: Actor
- Years active: 2014–present

Harris Dickinson (born 24 June 1996) is an English actor. He began his acting career in British television and had his first starring role in the drama film Beach Rats (2017), for which he was nominated for the Independent Spirit Award for Best Male Lead. He played John Paul Getty III in the FX drama series Trust (2018).

Dickinson has since starred in the films Maleficent: Mistress of Evil (2019), The King's Man (2021), Triangle of Sadness (2022), Where the Crawdads Sing (2022), The Iron Claw (2023), and Babygirl (2024), along with the miniseries A Murder at the End of the World (2023). He has received nominations for two BAFTA Awards. In 2025, Dickinson made his feature film directorial debut with Urchin, which premiered at the 2025 Cannes Film Festival and won him the FIPRESCI Prize.

== Early life ==
Dickinson was born 24 June 1996 in Whipps Cross University Hospital, East London, and grew up in Highams Park. His father was a social worker and his mother was a hairdresser, and they divorced when Dickinson was a primary school pupil. At 17, he dropped out of school, where he was studying film and theatre. Dickinson almost opted for a career in the Royal Marines, before being persuaded to return to the theatre by his coach at RAW Academy in London.

== Career ==
=== 2010s ===
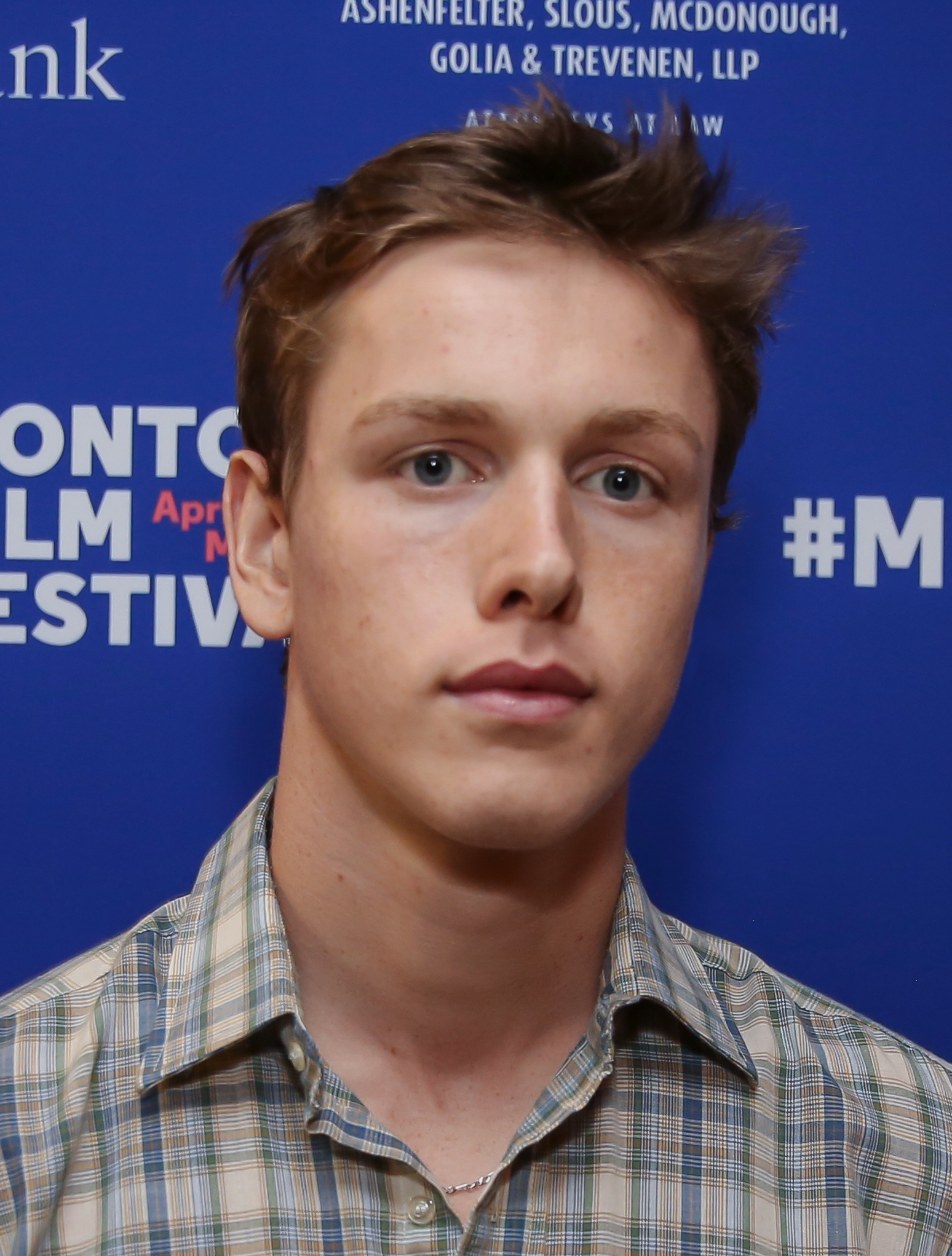
Dickinson in 2017

In 2016, Dickinson was cast as Frankie, a young man struggling with his sexuality, in Eliza Hittman's film Beach Rats. The Times critic Ed Potton highlighted Dickinson for having "perfected a south Brooklyn accent" as Frankie. For his performance, Dickinson was nominated for the Independent Spirit Award for Best Male Lead and the Gotham Independent Film Award for Breakthrough Actor.

In 2018, Dickinson starred in the FX drama television series Trust as John Paul Getty III. In 2019, he voiced the character Gurjin in the Netflix series The Dark Crystal: Age of Resistance. He also starred in The Darkest Minds. He also appeared in Matthias & Maxime, a french Canadian film that premiered at the Cannes Film festival

=== 2020s ===
In 2021, Dickinson starred in the third instalment of the Kingsman film series, The King's Man, as Conrad Oxford. The role gained him his first BAFTA Film Award nomination for the EE Rising Star Award.

In 2022, he starred in Triangle of Sadness as a model on a cruise. The film premiered at the 2022 Cannes Film Festival and won the Palme d'Or. Reviewing the film, Variety's Peter Debruge wrote Dickinson "brings a kind of fragile vulnerability to the Abercrombie frat-boy type". Dickinson co-starred in Where the Crawdads Sing, a film adaptation of Delia Owens' novel of the same name, which was released in July 2022.

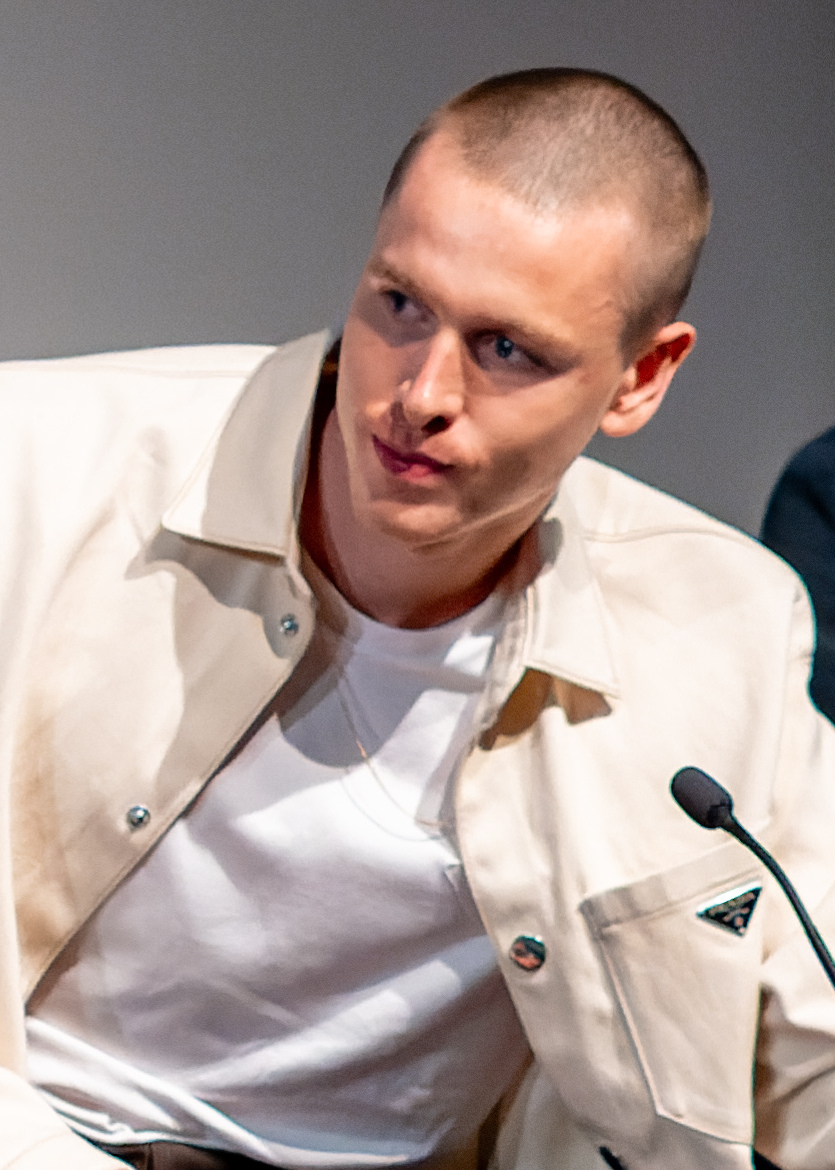
Dickinson in 2023

In 2023, he starred in the FX on Hulu limited series A Murder at the End of the World. For his role in it, Dickinson was nominated for a British Academy Television Award for Best Supporting Actor. He then starred in Scrapper as Jason, an estranged father who reconnects with his daughter. The film was written and directed by Charlotte Regan, and premiered at the 2023 Sundance Film Festival. In the same year, he portrayed David Von Erich in the sports drama The Iron Claw, about the Von Erich family. David Ehrlich of IndieWire found "the endlessly surprising Harris Dickinson [to be] warm and brilliant" in his part.

The following year, he had a supporting role in the period drama film Blitz. He then starred alongside Nicole Kidman in the erotic drama film Babygirl. David Rooney of The Hollywood Reporter wrote, "Dickinson's unforced intensity makes him a magnetic screen presence", adding that "he hasn't exuded this much undiluted sexuality since Beach Rats".

In 2025, Dickinson made his feature-length directorial debut with Urchin. The film premiered at the 2025 Cannes Film Festival and won him the FIPRESCI Prize. The film also won the best actor award. He has also been cast as John Lennon in Sam Mendes's four-part biopic of the Beatles.

== Personal life ==
Dickinson has been in a long-term relationship with musical artist Rose Gray since secondary school. He directed Gray's music videos for "Blue" and "Afraid of Nothing".

In April 2025, Dickinson signed an open letter in support of trans rights. The letter, organised by LGBTQ advocacy groups, was published in response to growing political and media hostility toward the trans community in the United Kingdom, calling for solidarity and the defence of trans rights and dignity.

Dickinson is a signatory of the Film Workers for Palestine boycott pledge that was published in September 2025.

== Filmography ==
Key
†	Denotes films that have not yet been released

=== Film ===
Year	Title	Role	Notes
2017	Beach Rats	Frankie	
2018	The Darkest Minds	Liam Stewart	
2018	Postcards from London	Jim	
2019	County Lines	Simon	
2019	Maleficent: Mistress of Evil	Prince Phillip	
2019	Matthias & Maxime	Kevin McAfee	
2021	The King's Man	Conrad Oxford	
2021	The Souvenir Part II	Pete	
2022	Don't Look at the Demon	Ben	
2022	See How They Run	Richard Attenborough	
2022	Triangle of Sadness	Carl	
2022	Where the Crawdads Sing	Chase Andrews	
2023	Scrapper	Jason	
2023	The Iron Claw	David Von Erich	
2024	Babygirl	Samuel	
2024	Blitz	Jack	
2025	Urchin	Nathan	Also director and screenwriter
2028	The Beatles – A Four-Film Cinematic Event	John Lennon	Filming

=== Television ===
Year	Title	Role	Notes
2014	Some Girls	Tonka	2 episodes
2016	Home	P.K. Bell	Television film
2017	Clique	Sam	Recurring role (series 1)
2017	Silent Witness	Aaron Logan	Episode: "Remembrance" (2 parts)
2018	Trust	John Paul Getty III	Main role
2019	The Dark Crystal: Age of Resistance	Gurjin (voice)	8 episodes
2023	A Murder at the End of the World	Bill	Miniseries

== Awards and nominations ==
Year	Award	Category	Nominated work	Result	Ref.
2017	Gotham Independent Film Awards	Breakthrough Actor	Beach Rats	Nominated	
2017	Independent Spirit Awards	Best Male Lead	Beach Rats	Nominated	
2018	London Film Critics Circle Awards	Young British/Irish Performer	Beach Rats	Won	
2020	British Independent Film Awards	Best Supporting Actor	County Lines	Nominated	
2022	BAFTA Awards	EE Rising Star Award	—	Nominated	
2023	British Independent Film Awards	Best Joint Lead Performance (shared with Lola Campbell)	Scrapper	Nominated	
2023	London Film Critics' Circle	British/Irish Actor of the Year	—	Nominated	
2024	BAFTA Television Awards	Best Supporting Actor	A Murder at the End of the World	Nominated	
2025	British Independent Film Awards	Best British Independent Film	Urchin	Nominated	
2025	British Independent Film Awards	The Douglas Hickox Award (Best Debut Director)	Urchin	Nominated	
2025	Cannes Film Festival	Camera d'Or	Urchin	Nominated	
2025	Cannes Film Festival	FIPRESCI Prize (Un Certain Regard)	Urchin	Won	
2025	Cannes Film Festival	Un Certain Regard Award	Urchin	Nominated	
2025	Gotham Awards	Breakthrough Director	Urchin	Nominated	
2025	London Critics' Circle Film Awards	Breakthrough British/Irish Filmmaker of the Year	Urchin	Pending	
2025	Santa Barbara International Film Festival	Virtuoso Award	Babygirl	Won	
2025	Werner Herzog Foundation	Werner Herzog Film Award	Urchin	Won	
