= Von Erich family =

American professional wrestling family

Picture of the Von Erichs. From left to right: Kerry, Fritz, Chris (front), Kevin, Mike and David.

The Von Erich family is an American professional wrestling family. Originally from Texas, their surname is Adkisson, but every member working in wrestling has used the ring name "Von Erich" after family patriarch Fritz Von Erich (real name Jack Adkisson), who used his mother's maiden name (Erich), adding the "von". In total, ten members of the family have been professional wrestlers since Fritz' debut in 1953, with two still active today. In the 20th century, the family primarily wrestled in the National Wrestling Alliance (NWA) and in their own World Class Championship Wrestling (WCWA) promotion, the latter featuring them as central heroic characters.

Fritz and his wife Doris had six children between 1952 and 1969, all sons. Their firstborn, Jack Jr., died at age six; all their surviving sons grew up to become professional wrestlers. By the time Fritz died of cancer in 1997 at age 68, five of his sons had predeceased him: In addition to Jack Jr., who drowned in a freak accident in 1959, David died from enteritis in 1984 at age 25, and Mike, Chris, and Kerry all died by suicide, respectively in 1987 at age 23, 1991 at age 21, and 1993 at age 33. Kevin, Fritz's only surviving son, retired from wrestling in 1995. The Von Erichs' involvement in wrestling is now in its third generation: Kerry's daughter Lacey wrestled from 2007 until 2010, and Kevin's sons Marshall and Ross have been wrestling since 2012, at times as a tag team named "The Von Erichs". Several unrelated wrestlers have also been presented on-screen as members of the Von Erich family.

The deaths of Kevin's brothers are primarily the basis for a widespread myth about a family curse. The term "Von Erich curse" is also used colloquially to refer to the chain of events leading to each brother's death, as well as associated tragedies (such as the death of David's two-month-old daughter of SIDS in 1978). The story of the Von Erich family has been presented as a cautionary tale about parental influence and the various dangers of the professional wrestling business. They remain one of the best-known families in professional wrestling, both for their accomplishments and their tragic personal history: Fritz and all five of his wrestler sons were collectively inducted into the WWE Hall of Fame in 2009, and he, David, Kerry and Kevin were all individually inducted into the St. Louis Wrestling Hall of Fame between 2007 and 2016. The family was the subject of a Dark Side of the Ring episode in 2019 and the 2023 biographical film The Iron Claw, titled after the Von Erichs' signature move.

== Members ==
=== Fritz Von Erich ===
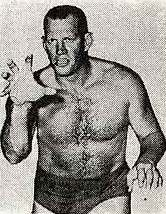
Family patriarch Fritz Von Erich, 1976

Fritz Von Erich was born Jack Barton Adkisson on August 16, 1929, in Jewett, Texas. Originally trained by Stu Hart, Fritz became a top star in many National Wrestling Alliance (NWA) promotions, most notably in St. Louis and in World Class Championship Wrestling (WCCW). He held the AWA World Heavyweight Championship at one time in the 1960s. Despite never winning the NWA World Heavyweight Championship, he maintained his presence within the NWA, holding many other major belts. Fritz also served briefly as NWA President in the 1970s, as well as President of WCCW when it moved to Dallas, Texas. Fritz was also a major part of Japanese wrestling, where he was known as "Tetsu no Tsume" (鉄の爪; "The Iron Claw"), and helped rebuild the business after the death of Rikidōzan.

Fritz married Doris on June 23, 1950, and they had six sons before divorcing on July 21, 1992. On September 10, 1997, Fritz died of lung cancer that had spread to his brain.

=== Second generation ===
==== Jack Adkisson Jr. ====
Fritz Von Erich's first son was born Jack Barton Adkisson Jr. on September 21, 1952. He died at age six in Niagara Falls, New York, on March 7, 1959, after he stepped on a trailer tongue, was electrically shocked, then fell into a melting snow puddle face first and drowned.

==== Kevin Von Erich ====
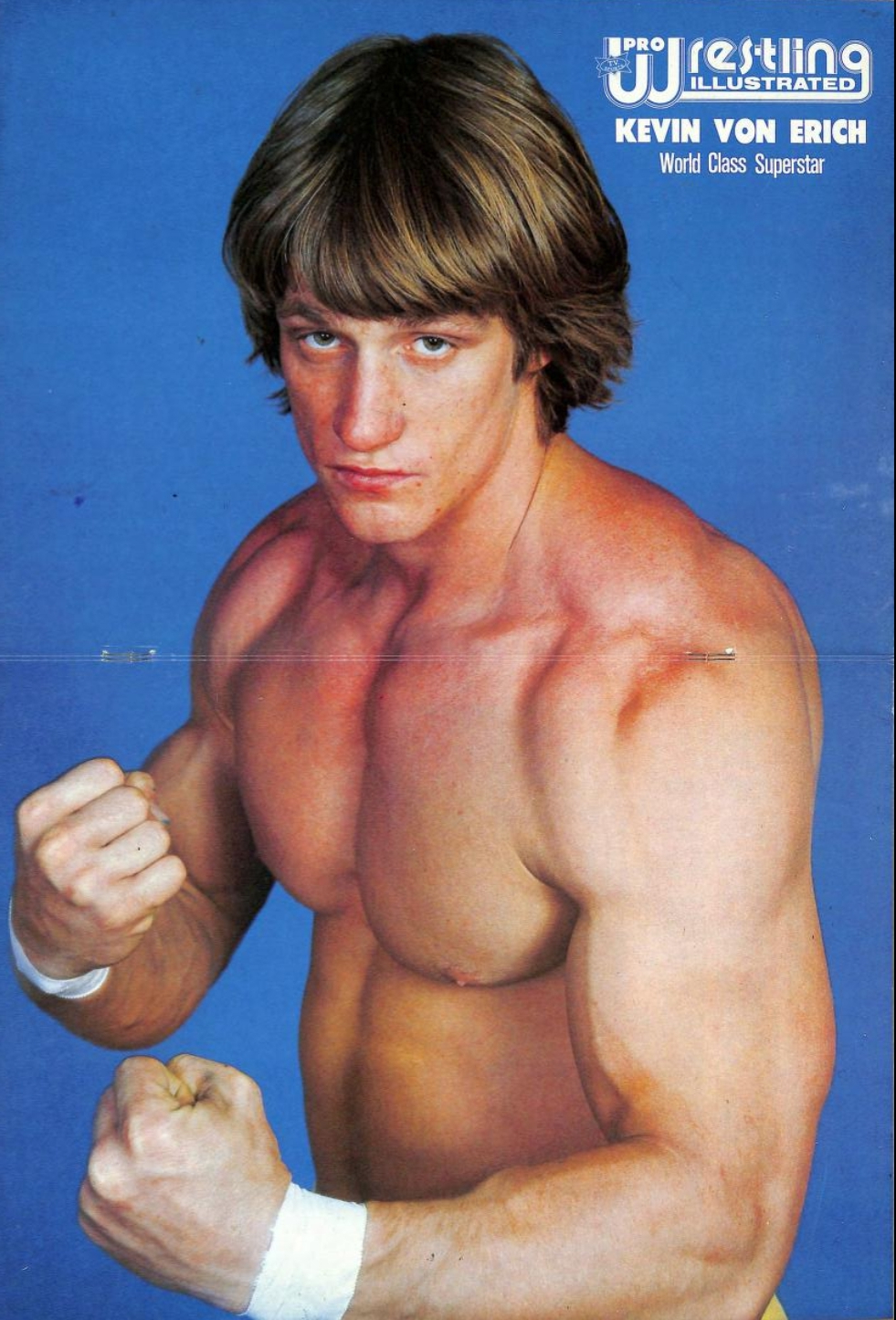
Kevin Von Erich, c. 1983

Born Kevin Ross Adkisson on May 15, 1957, in Belleville, Illinois, "The Golden Warrior" Kevin Von Erich is the second oldest and last surviving son of Fritz Von Erich. The majority of Kevin's career was spent working in World Class Championship Wrestling (WCCW), where he had feuds with wrestlers including Chris Adams, The Fabulous Freebirds, and Ric Flair. There, Kevin became known for utilizing trademark maneuvers like the body scissors and the iron claw, as well as for wrestling barefoot.

Kevin and Pamela J. May married on August 1, 1980 and have four children including two daughters: Kristen Rain (born February 3, 1981) and Jillian Lindsey (born February 10, 1985) as well as two sons: David Michael "Ross" (born June 1, 1988) and Kevin Marshall (born November 10, 1992). Kevin has thirteen grandchildren.

In May 2006, Kevin sold the WCCW footage to Vince McMahon and World Wrestling Entertainment (WWE). At WrestleMania 25, Kevin represented the Von Erich family during their induction into the WWE Hall of Fame. In 2015, Kevin appeared in an ESPN 30 for 30 short film titled "Wrestling the Curse".

==== David Von Erich ====
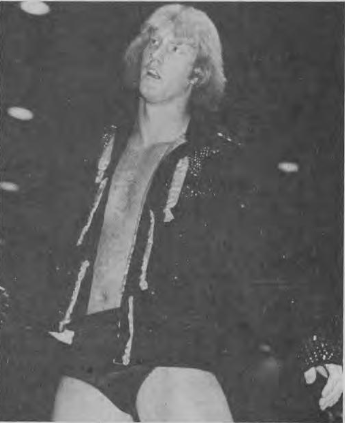
David Von Erich, c. 1982

"The Yellow Rose of Texas" David Von Erich was the third son of Fritz Von Erich. He was born David Alan Adkisson on July 22, 1958, in Dallas. David worked in the World Class Championship Wrestling promotion. It was there that he faced off with Harley Race and later Ric Flair several times for the NWA World Heavyweight Championship (never winning), as well as teamed with brothers Kevin and Kerry against The Fabulous Freebirds. David also wrestled in Missouri, winning the Missouri Heavyweight Championship on a couple of occasions. From late 1981 to mid-1982, David wrestled in the Florida territory to show that he could work as a heel. This run was successful, with David enjoying brief reigns as both singles and tag team champion.

David was married on June 26, 1978, to Candy L. McLeod. Together, they had a daughter Natosha Zoeanna (born October 19, 1978). The baby died in infancy and David's marriage soon ended in divorce on July 12, 1979. He married again on June 8, 1982, to Patricia A. Matter. They remained together until David's death.

David died on February 10, 1984, in Tokyo. The U.S. Embassy's death report says he died of acute enteritis. Ric Flair wrote in his autobiography, To Be the Man, that "everyone in wrestling believes" that it was a drug overdose that really killed him and that Bruiser Brody (a fellow wrestler who found David) disposed of the narcotics by flushing them down a toilet before the police arrived. Mick Foley also claims that David died from an apparent drug overdose. A tribute show was held a couple of months later in his honor, during which his younger brother, Kerry Von Erich, won the NWA World Title from Ric Flair.

==== Kerry Von Erich ====
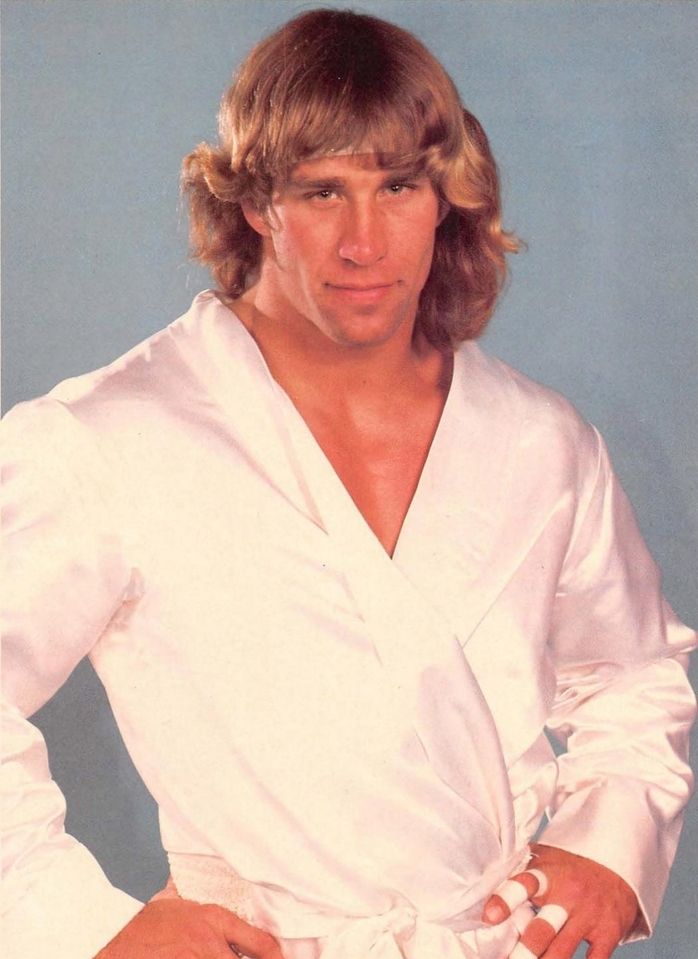
Kerry von Erich in 1987

Kerry Von Erich was the fourth son of Fritz Von Erich. He was born Kerry Gene Adkisson on February 3, 1960, in Niagara Falls, New York. Known as "The Modern Day Warrior" and "The Texas Tornado", Kerry was by far the best-known of the Von Erich Family. Much like his brothers, Kerry spent the majority of his career wrestling in World Class Championship Wrestling. Amongst the many major feuds he had were those against Gino Hernandez, Iceman Parsons, Chris Adams and The Fabulous Freebirds. Kerry became the most successful of the Von Erich family when he won the NWA World Heavyweight Title from Ric Flair at the David Von Erich Memorial Parade of Champions, a tribute show to his deceased older brother. Kerry lost the belt three weeks later to Flair. Kerry also wrestled for several months under the ring name "The Texas Tornado" in both the World Wrestling Federation (where he won the WWF Intercontinental Championship at SummerSlam on August 27, 1990) and Global Wrestling Federation.

Kerry was married on June 18, 1983, to Catherine "Cathy" Murray. Together they had two daughters: Hollie Brooke (born September 19, 1984) and Lacey Dawn (born July 17, 1986). Lacey wrestled for several years, most notably with TNA as Lacey Von Erich, before leaving the wrestling business in 2010. Kerry and Catherine later separated, before divorcing on April 22, 1992. On June 4, 1986, Kerry was involved in a motorcycle accident while attempting to pass a truck on a two-lane road, Von Erich crashed into the back of a police car. The resulting wreck crushed his right foot and dislocated his hip. Matters were made worse sometime later when Von Erich attempted to walk on his already damaged foot well before it healed.

As a result, his foot was amputated. He continued wrestling after the accident with a prosthesis and kept the amputation secret from the majority of fans and fellow wrestlers. He became addicted to pain killers, developed several drug problems, and was arrested multiple times. Kerry died by suicide, shooting a .44 caliber bullet through his heart on February 18, 1993, on his father's ranch. There is a marker of an angel placed by his father Fritz on the spot where Kerry shot himself. Bret Hart said in his autobiography, Hitman: My Real Life in the Cartoon World of Wrestling, that Kerry had told him months before about his plans, that he had wanted to follow his late brothers and that they were calling him. His marriage had fallen apart and he thought his death was inevitable.

==== Mike Von Erich ====
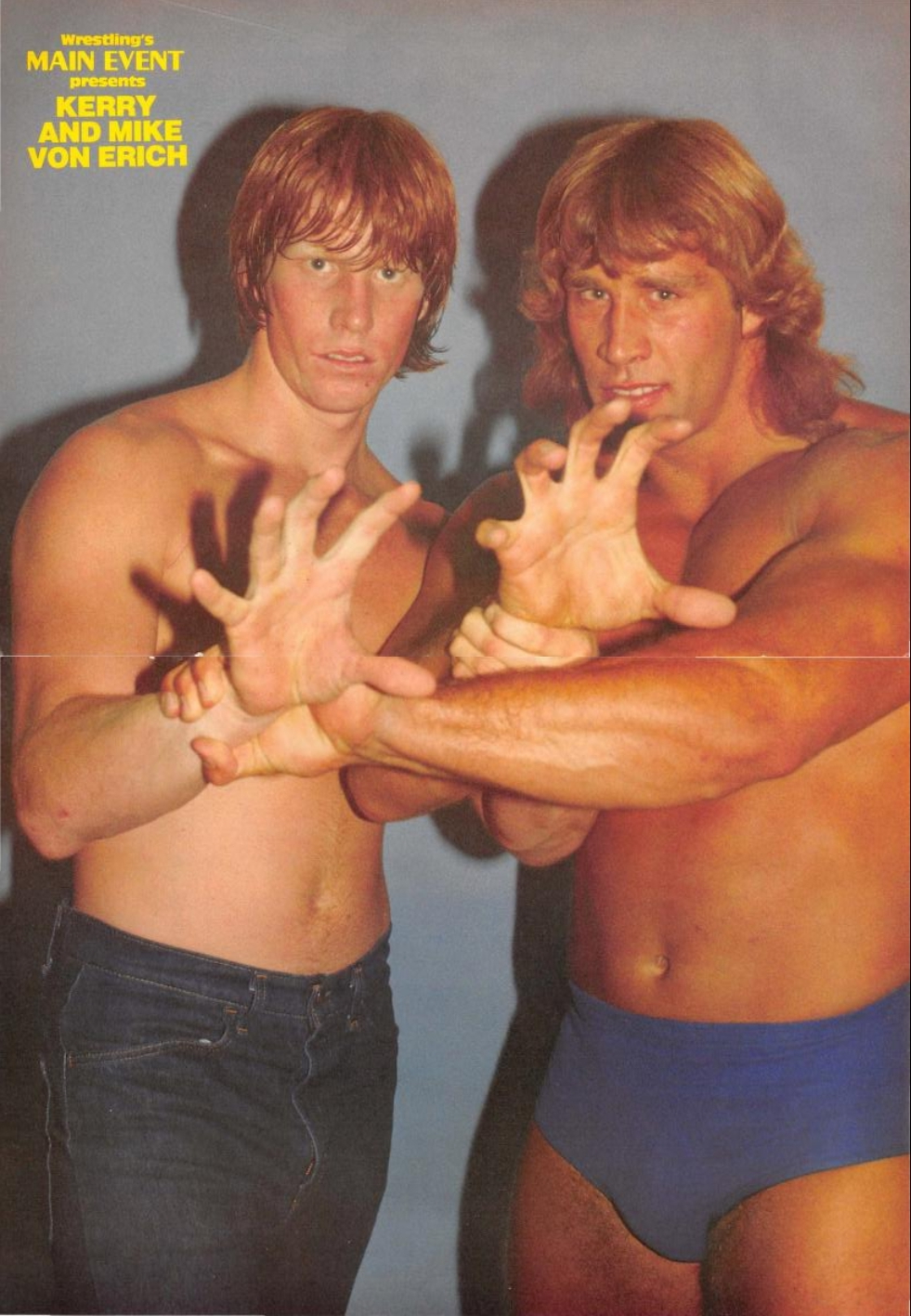
Mike and Kerry Von Erich in 1984

Mike Von Erich was the fifth son of Fritz Von Erich. He was born Michael Brett Adkisson on March 2, 1964, in Dallas and was later known as the "Inspirational Warrior". Mike replaced David in the feud the Von Erichs had with The Fabulous Freebirds after David's death. According to the DVD Heroes of World Class, Mike wanted to work for World Class as a cameraman and had no interest in being in the ring full-time. His only previous appearance on-screen was being involved in an angle where Ric Flair insulted him and wrestled him as a run-up to what was planned as David winning the NWA World Heavyweight Championship, but Fritz pressured Mike into the ring after David's death. Kevin once stated that Mike suffered from the pressure of having to "be David" and to succeed on the same level as his older brothers.

Mike was married on February 14, 1985, to Shani Danette Garza, but they divorced later the same year. In 1985, he injured his shoulder on a tour of Israel and had surgery, leading to toxic shock syndrome, as there was an infection missed by the surgeons. He suffered some brain damage as a result of his illness and lost a great deal of weight. In 1986, he also suffered head injuries from a car accident in which his vehicle overturned after he lost control.

Mike tried returning to wrestling after partial recovery. He continued to compete despite lack of mental coordination and strength. After an arrest for DUI and marijuana possession, Mike took a fatal dose of tranquilizers and alcohol around April 12, 1987, near the entrance of Pilot Knoll Park at Lewisville Lake. He was missing for 4–5 days, with the date of death being set the Sunday after bailing out of jail.

==== Chris Von Erich ====
Born Chris Barton Adkisson on September 30, 1969, in Dallas, Chris Von Erich was the youngest of the Von Erich family. With his short stature (5'5”), asthma, and extremely brittle bones, which were prone to breaking, Chris was never able to achieve the success that his father and brothers achieved. He made many attempts to succeed in the squared circle because of his incredible love of wrestling, which kept him going despite numerous injuries. He managed to be in a major feud with Percy Pringle in the USWA/World Class, but his career did not take off like the rest of the family's. On occasion, he and his brothers Kerry and Kevin, as well as Chris Adams, wrestled tag-team matches against Percy Pringle and Steve Austin, but Chris only wrestled Pringle, while the much more athletic Adams, Kerry or Kevin wrestled Austin.

After several years of not being able to succeed in the wrestling business, Chris became depressed and frustrated. He was also heartbroken over the loss of his brother, Mike, and experienced drug addiction. On September 12, 1991, aged 21, he shot himself in the head. His brother Kevin and mother attempted to dissuade him from his suicidal tendencies that same day. An apparent suicide note had been found at the scene in Edom, Texas. Toxicology reports also revealed cocaine and valium were in Chris' system at the time of his death.

=== Third generation ===
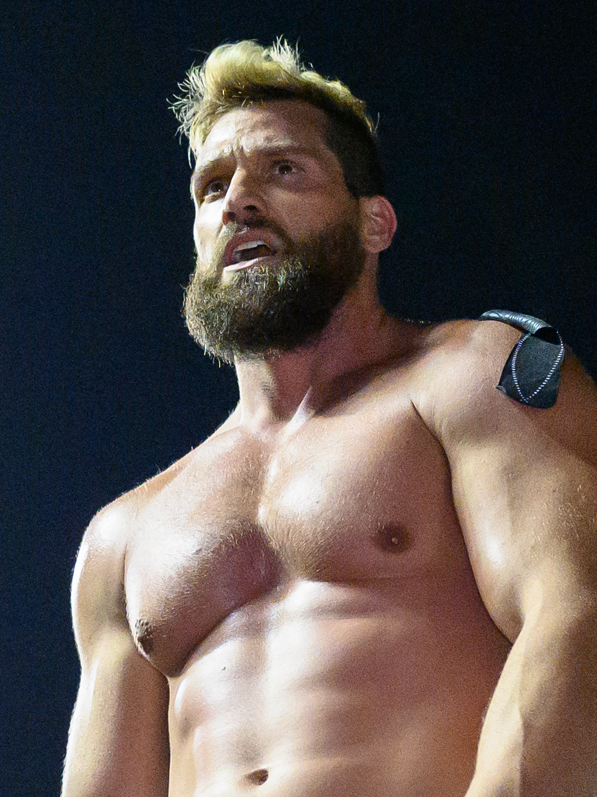
Ross Von Erich in 2019

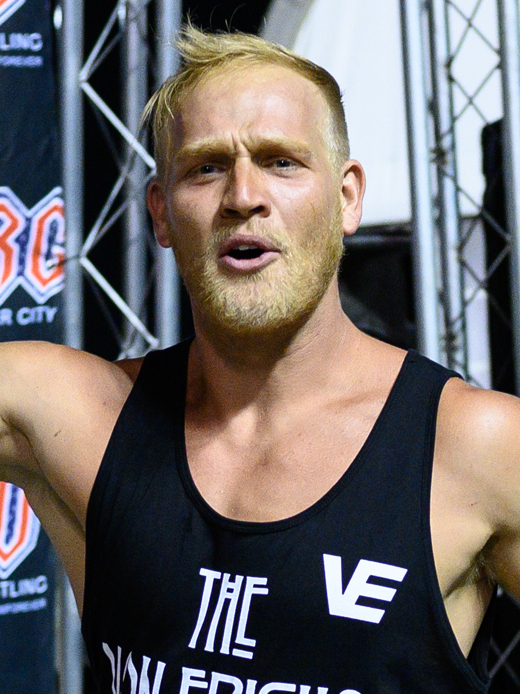
Marshall Von Erich in 2019

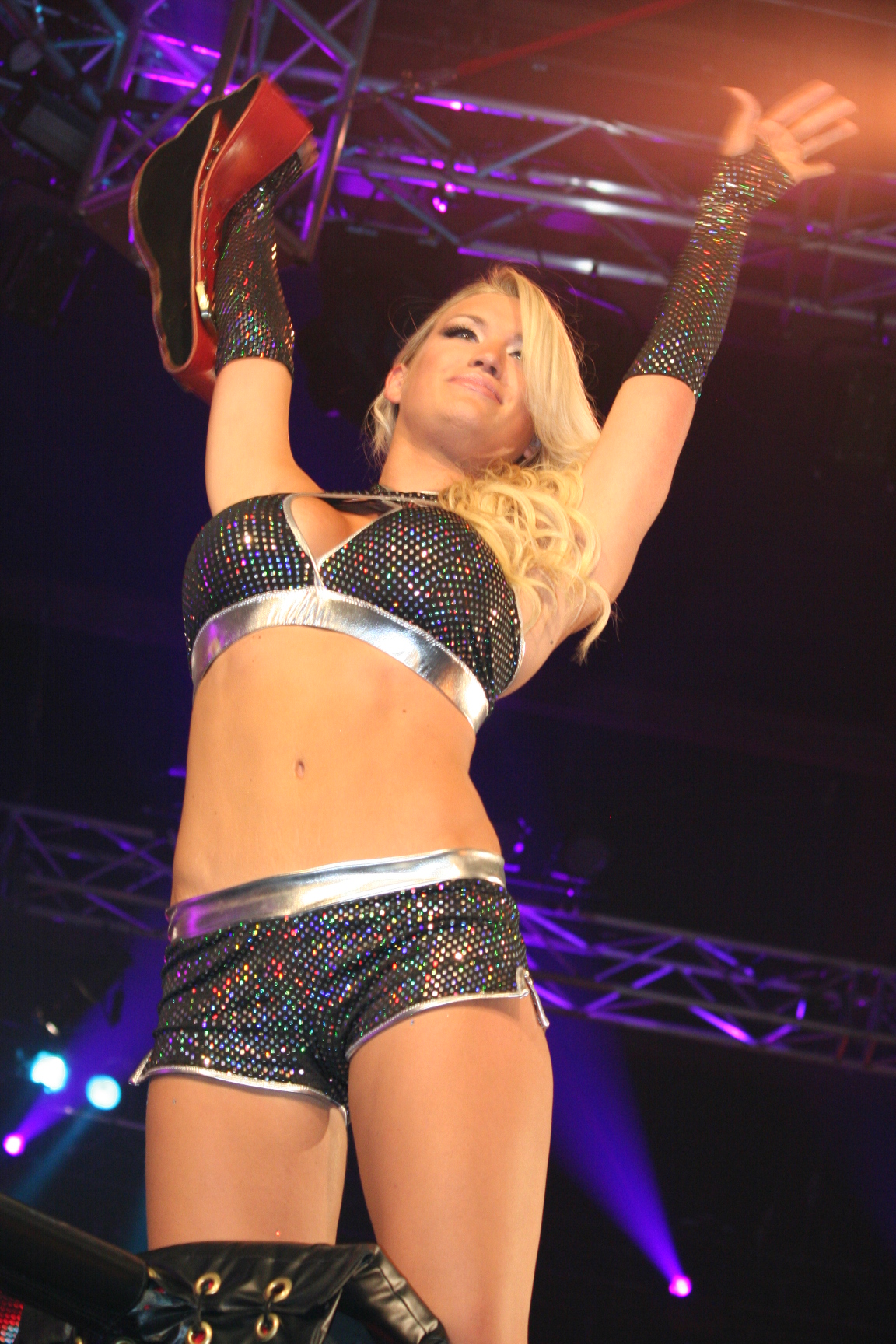
Lacey Von Erich, the first of three third-generation Von Erichs to wrestle in TNA, and a former TNA Knockouts Tag Team Champion

==== Ross Von Erich ====
David Michael Ross Adkisson (born June 1, 1988), better known as Ross Von Erich, is the son of Kevin Von Erich. He is named after David and Mike. He was trained by Kevin, Harley Race and the Pro Wrestling Noah dojo. Ross returned to Texas to attend college in 2008, according to the family website, and reportedly has wrestled a couple of times. In a 2010 interview, Ross stated that he and his brother Marshall are also training to become professional wrestlers. They debuted as a tag team for Pro Wrestling Noah on July 22, 2012. Ross and Marshall made their national television debut as part of the Total Nonstop Action Wrestling (TNA) Slammiversary XII PPV on June 15, 2014, in a tag match defeating The BroMans via disqualification. In July 2017 Ross, along with his brother Marshall and father Kevin, wrestled at the Rage Megashow in Israel. In May 2019, Ross and Marshall signed a multi-year contract with Major League Wrestling (MLW).

==== Marshall Von Erich ====
Kevin Marshall Adkisson (born November 10, 1992), better known as Marshall Von Erich, is the son of Kevin Von Erich. He is named after his father. He was trained by Kevin, Harley Race and at the Noah dojo. He debuted in 2012, with his brother Ross in Pro Wrestling Noah. He adopted his father's trademark of wrestling barefoot. Marshall and Ross made their national television debut at Slammiversary XII on June 15, 2014, where they defeated The BroMans. On May 29, 2015, the brothers debuted at Imperial Wrestling Revolution, their new home promotion. They won the IWR Tag Team Championships from the Arrow Club in 2017. In July 2017 Marshall, along with his brother Ross and father Kevin, wrestled at the Rage Megashow in Israel. In May 2019, Marshall and Ross signed a multi-year contract with Major League Wrestling (MLW).

==== Lacey Von Erich ====
Lacey Dawn Adkisson (born July 17, 1986), better known as Lacey Von Erich is the daughter of Kerry Von Erich. She was previously with World Wrestling Entertainment and Total Nonstop Action (TNA) where she was a former TNA Knockouts Tag Team Champion. She retired in 2010.

== Fictional relatives ==
=== Waldo Von Erich ===
Waldo Von Erich was the stage name of Canadian professional wrestler Walter Sieber. Though billed as the brother of Fritz Von Erich when they teamed, he is not related to the Adkisson family. Waldo died in July 2009.

=== Lance Von Erich ===
Lance Von Erich was the stage name of Dallas-born professional wrestler William Kevin "Ricky" Vaughn. He was billed for a brief period of time in the 1980s as the son of Waldo Von Erich, but there was no biological relation between the two. Lance also has no biological relation to the Adkisson family.

=== Rip Von Erich ===
On two episodes of MLW Fusion, Tom Lawlor, who was involved in a feud with the Von Erichs after turning his back on them, mercilessly beat and then aligned himself with a wrestler he called "Rip Von Erich", who was played by a wrestler who had previously gone under the name Kit Osbourne in other promotions.

=== Mark Von Erich ===
Rick LeRibeus, a Texas-based wrestler, has been billed as "Mark Von Erich" since the 1990s. Eventually, it became a storyline in the Global Wrestling Federation with Skandor Akbar accusing LeRibeus of being an illegitimate son of Fritz Von Erich.

== WWE Hall of Fame ==
On March 16, 2009, it was announced that six members the Von Erich family would be inducted as a group into the WWE Hall of Fame. The recipients are Fritz, and all five of his sons who became professional wrestlers: Kevin, David, Kerry, Mike, and Chris. They were inducted by longtime Von Erich rival Michael "P.S." Hayes, with Kevin, the sole living inductee, accepting the induction at the ceremony.

== Family tree ==
† = deceased

Fritz Von Erich^{†} (1929–1997)
Jack Adkisson, Jr.^{†} (1952–1959)	Kevin Von Erich (born 1957)	David Von Erich^{†} (1958–1984)	Kerry Von Erich^{†} (1960–1993)	Mike Von Erich^{†} (1964–1987)	Chris Von Erich^{†} (1969–1991)
Ross Von Erich (born 1988)	Marshall Von Erich (born 1992)	Natosha Zoeanna Adkisson ^{†} (1978–1978)	Hollie Brooke Adkisson (born 1984)	Lacey Von Erich (born 1986)

== Championships and accomplishments ==
As a family

- WWE
  - WWE Hall of Fame (Class of 2009) - Fritz, Kerry, Kevin, Mike, David, and Chris Von Erich

Individual

- Fritz Von Erich
  - Championships and accomplishments
- Kevin Von Erich
  - Championships and accomplishments
- David Von Erich
  - Championships and accomplishments
- Kerry Von Erich
  - Championships and accomplishments
- Mike Von Erich
  - Championships and accomplishments
- Chris Von Erich
  - Championships and accomplishments
- Lacey Von Erich
  - Championships and accomplishments
- Marshall and Ross Von Erich
  - Championships and accomplishments

== In popular culture ==
The A24 film The Iron Claw takes its title from the wrestling move used by several of the family members. The movie portrays the Von Erich family through the 1970s, 1980s, and 1990s; directed by Sean Durkin, the film stars Zac Efron, Lily James, Jeremy Allen White, Harris Dickinson, Maura Tierney, Chavo Guerrero Jr. and Holt McCallany.

== See also ==
- List of premature professional wrestling deaths
