= WWE Hall of Fame (2009) =

WWE Hall of Fame induction ceremony

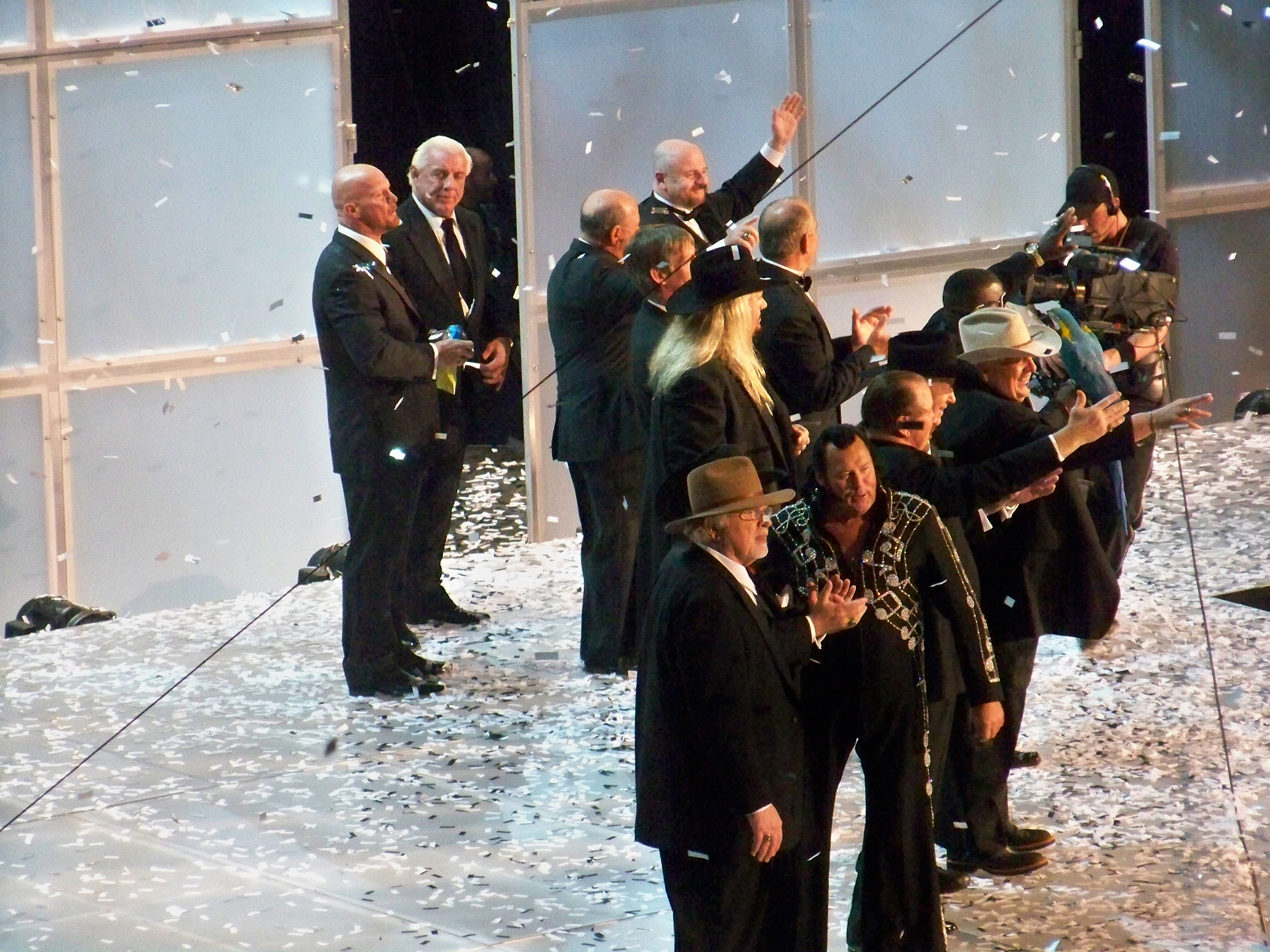
- The WWE Hall of Fame Class of 2009 and their inductors
- Promotion: WWE
- Date: April 4, 2009
- City: Houston, Texas
- Venue: Toyota Center

WWE Hall of Fame chronology
| ← Previous; 2008 | Next → 2010 |

WWE Hall of Fame (2009) was the event which featured the introduction of the 10th class to the WWE Hall of Fame. The event was produced by World Wrestling Entertainment (WWE) on April 4, 2009, from the Toyota Center in Houston, Texas. The event took place the same weekend as WrestleMania 25. The event was hosted by Jerry Lawler and Todd Grisham. The ceremony aired later that evening on the USA Network. In March 2015 the ceremony was added to the WWE Network.

== Inductees ==
=== Individual ===
- Class headliners appear in **boldface**

| Image | Ring name (Birth Name) | Inducted by | WWE recognized accolades |
|---|---|---|---|
| | **Stone Cold Steve Austin** (Steven Anderson) | Vince McMahon | Six-time WWF Champion; Two-time WWF Intercontinental Champion; Two-time WCW United States Heavyweight Champion; Two-time WCW World Television Champion; Four-time WWF Tag Team Champion; One-time WCW World Tag Team Champion; One-time NWA World Tag Team Champion; 1996 King of the Ring; A record three-time Royal Rumble winner (1997, 1998, 2001) |
| | Ricky "The Dragon" Steamboat (Richard Blood) | Ric Flair | One-time NWA World Heavyweight Champion; Four-time NWA/WCW United States Heavyweight Champion; One-time WWF Intercontinental Heavyweight Champion |
| | "Cowboy" Bill Watts | Jim Ross | Former wrestling promoter in the mid-south United States; One-time WWWF United States Tag Team Champion and held over 20 NWA regional championships |
| | Howard Finkel | Gene Okerlund | WWE ring announcer since 1977 and first employee hired by the WWE in 1975; Credited with inventing the term Wrestlemania and also giving Ricky Steamboat his "Dragon" ringname |
| | Koko B. Ware (James Ware) | The Honky Tonk Man | Held several NWA regional championships |

=== Groups ===
| Image | Group | Inducted by | WWE recognized accolades |
|---|---|---|---|
| | **The Funks** | Dusty Rhodes | Held several tag team championships, including the NWA International Tag Team Championship on three occasions |
Terry Funk – one-time NWA World Heavyweight Champion, two-time ECW World Heavyweight Champion and one-time WWF Tag Team Champion. Dory Funk Jr. – one-time NWA World Heavyweight Champion
| | **The Von Erichs** | Michael Hayes | Noted wrestling family that spent many years wrestling in World Class Championship Wrestling (WCCW); Various combinations of the family held several NWA regional and WCCW tag team championships, including the WCCW World Tag Team and World Six-Man Tag Team Championship |
Fritz Von Erich (Jack Adkisson) – Posthumous inductee: Founder and longtime owner of WCCW, one-time AWA World Heavyweight Champion and 16-time NWA American Heavyweight Champion (later renamed the WCCW World Heavyweight Championship). Kevin Von Erich (Kevin Adkisson) – Six-time NWA American/WCCW World Heavyweight Champion. David Von Erich (David Adkisson) – Posthumous inductee: Eight-time NWA Texas Heavyweight Champion. Kerry Von Erich (Kerry Adkisson) – Posthumous inductee: One-time NWA World Heavyweight Champion, nine-time NWA American/WCCW World Heavyweight Champion. Wrestled in WWF as "The Texas Tornado" where he was a one-time WWF Intercontinental Champion. Mike Von Erich (Michael Adkisson) – Posthumous inductee: One-time NWA American Heavyweight Champion. Chris Von Erich (Chris Adkisson) – Posthumous inductee: Wrestled and worked several backstage jobs for WCCW
