= Kevin Von Erich =

American professional wrestler (born 1957)

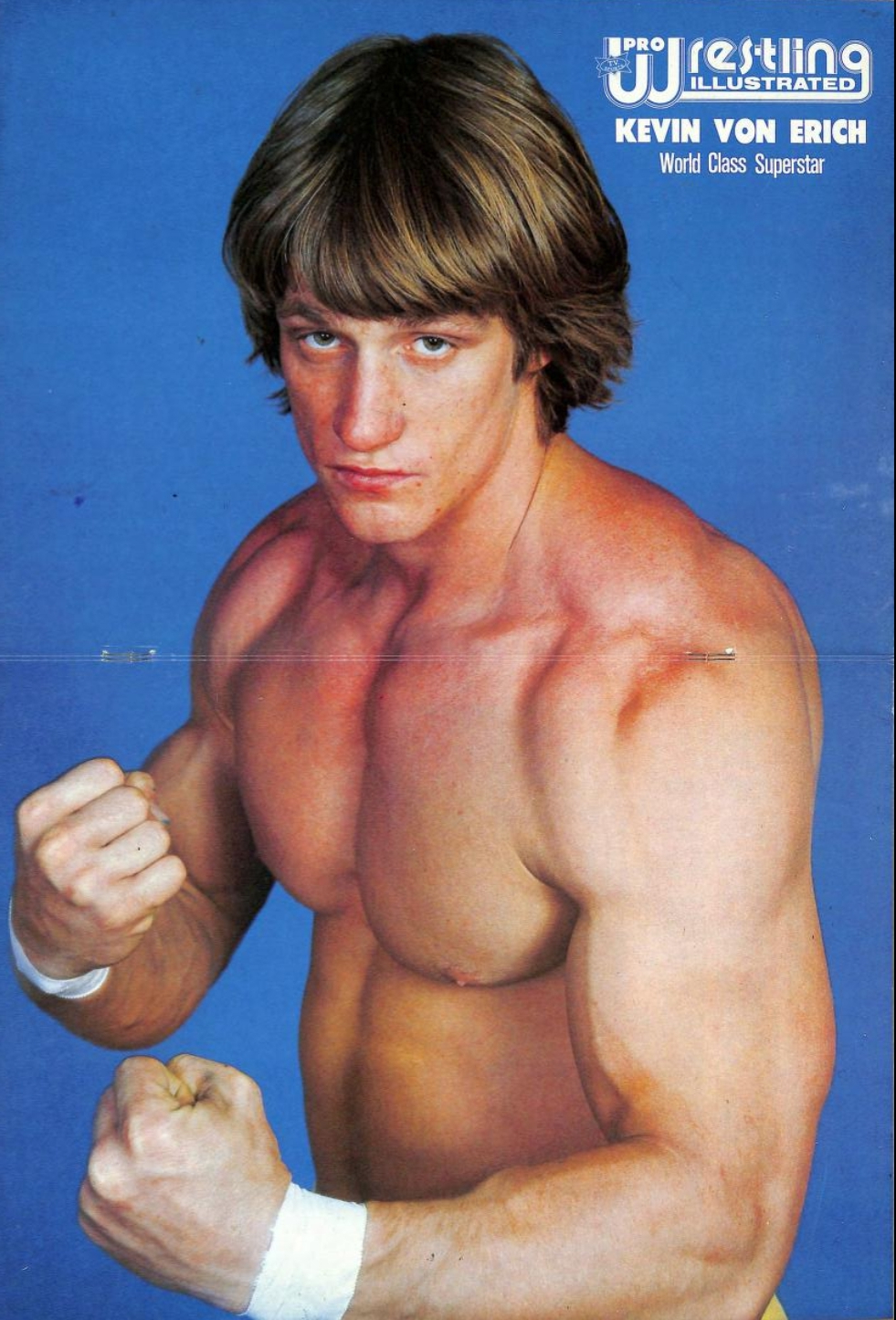
- Von Erich in 1983

Personal information
- Born: Kevin Ross Adkisson; May 15, 1957 (age 69) Belleville, Illinois, U.S.
- Spouse: Pam Adkisson (m. 1980)
- Children: 4 (including Marshall and Ross Von Erich)
- Family: Von Erich

Professional wrestling career
- Ring name: Kevin Von Erich
- Billed height: 6 ft 2 in (188 cm)
- Billed weight: 235 lb (107 kg)
- Billed from: Denton, Texas
- Trained by: Fritz Von Erich
- Debut: 1976
- Retired: July 17, 2017

Kevin Ross Adkisson (born May 15, 1957) is an American retired professional wrestler, better known by his ring name, Kevin Von Erich. He is signed to All Elite Wrestling (AEW) under a "Legends" deal and as a coach. A member of the Von Erich family, Adkisson is best known for his appearances with his father's World Class Championship Wrestling promotion. He is a former world champion in professional wrestling, having once held the WCWA World Heavyweight Championship.

== Football career ==
Adkisson played football at North Texas State University as a fullback until an injury ended his football career and dream of playing in the National Football League.

== Professional wrestling career ==
=== World Class Championship Wrestling (1976–1990) ===
==== Early career (1976–1981) ====
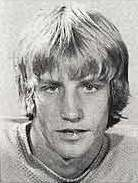
Adkisson in 1977

Adkisson started wrestling as Kevin Von Erich in 1976. He spent most of his career wrestling for his father's Dallas, Texas-based promotion, World Class Championship Wrestling (WCCW), a territory of the National Wrestling Alliance (NWA). Kevin's natural athletic ability and good looks made him one of the promotion's biggest stars. He achieved great success in the company both as a singles and tag team wrestler, often participating in many of the company's high-profile feuds. Kevin was also known for wrestling barefoot, highly unusual in a sport where almost all wrestlers wear high-topped boots. Announcers often jokingly referred to him as "The Barefoot Boy" on WCCW broadcasts. Kevin later admitted in an interview that he never set out to wrestle barefoot, but that before one of his matches, someone hid his boots as a joke and he was not able to find them before his match so he just went out barefoot to wrestle, and it later became his trademark. Contrary to popular belief, he wore boots in matches in his early career, including his debut match against Paul Perschmann and in a match against "Superfly" Jimmy Snuka. Kevin was a big fan of Snuka, who also wrestled barefoot, and Kevin often performed a move similar to Snuka's flying body splash from the top rope, which Snuka called the Superfly.

During the late-1970s, Kevin established himself in the Dallas territory. His first major success came in 1978 while wrestling as a tag team with his younger brother David. During the year, they captured the NWA Texas Tag Team Championship on two occasions as well as the NWA American Tag Team Championship. On Christmas Day 1978, he established himself firmly in the singles ranks of the promotion by defeating Bruiser Brody for the NWA American Heavyweight Championship. On January 21, 1980, Kevin made a wrestling appearance in the World Wrestling Federation (WWF, now WWE) against Johnny Rodz, a match he won. As the 1980s dawned, Kevin became one of the WCCW's most viable performers and continued to win numerous championships in both singles and tag team competition with a variety of different partners. However, his highest profile partners would always be his brothers Kerry and David. As the early-1980s progressed, Kevin would appear often at other NWA territories, including St. Louis Wrestling Club, Georgia Championship Wrestling (GCW), and briefly, Florida Championship Wrestling. Kevin also competed in a few matches for the WWF.

==== Freebird-Von Erich Feud (1982–1984) ====
In early 1982, the Fabulous Freebirds, consisting of Michael Hayes, Terry Gordy, and Buddy Roberts, left GCW after meeting WCCW booker Gary Hart at a show. Appearing in WCCW, the trio instantly became fan favorites due to a combination of their unique talents and chemistry as well as their close friendship with the Von Erichs. All three rose quickly through the ranks and in late November 1982, Hayes and Gordy defeated the team of King Kong Bundy and Wild Bill Irwin for the NWA American Tag Team Championship.

A feud between the Von Erichs and Freebirds developed roughly a month later. During WCCW's annual Christmas show in 1982, Kerry Von Erich faced Ric Flair for the NWA World Heavyweight Championship inside of a steel cage with Michael Hayes acting as a special referee. As explained in The Triumph and Tragedy of World Class Championship Wrestling DVD, the storyline, developed by Gary Hart, was written as Hayes having been selected by fans to be a special enforcer type of referee in the match. Near the end of the match, Flair shoved Hayes, which resulted in Hayes punching him. Hayes then tried to place Kerry on top of Flair to make the three count. Kerry refused to do so since it was not the "Texas thing to do", which led to a brief shoving match and argument between the two. Hayes, disgusted with the situation, told Terry Gordy, who had been assigned as the gatekeeper, to open the cage door. As Hayes was about to leave, Kerry was attacked from behind by Flair, with the former accidentally hitting Hayes and knocking him out of the cage. The angle was written as having neither Hayes nor Gordy being aware that Kerry was shoved into Hayes. As Kerry was getting to his feet inside the ring, that was the signal for Gordy to slam the cage door shut, hitting Kerry on the head and costing him the championship.

The Freebirds immediately became the top heels in the company, due to the belief of many fans that their actions cost one of their local heroes the NWA World Heavyweight Championship. As the feud was building, the WCCW television broadcasts were syndicated to television stations all across the United States, giving the promotion millions of viewers each week in the U.S. alone. This changed the face of wrestling and how it was marketed and presented to audiences. The extremely physical nature of the matches between the two factions captivated fans, changing preconceptions about what professional wrestling was and could be. Throughout the next several years, the Freebirds and Von Erichs engaged in numerous high-profile matches that were very physical in nature with the various members of each group feuding over various championships within the promotion. The feud is seen today by many fans and wrestling industry insiders as one of the best worked and most memorable feuds in the history of professional wrestling. This line of drama ended, when Kevin's brother, David von Erich, died in Japan from acute enteritis of the upper intestine. This broke up the symmetry of the wrestling rivalry, though eventually the remaining brothers went on to wrestle individually, with varying degrees of success.

==== Feuds with Chris Adams and Ric Flair (1985–1990) ====
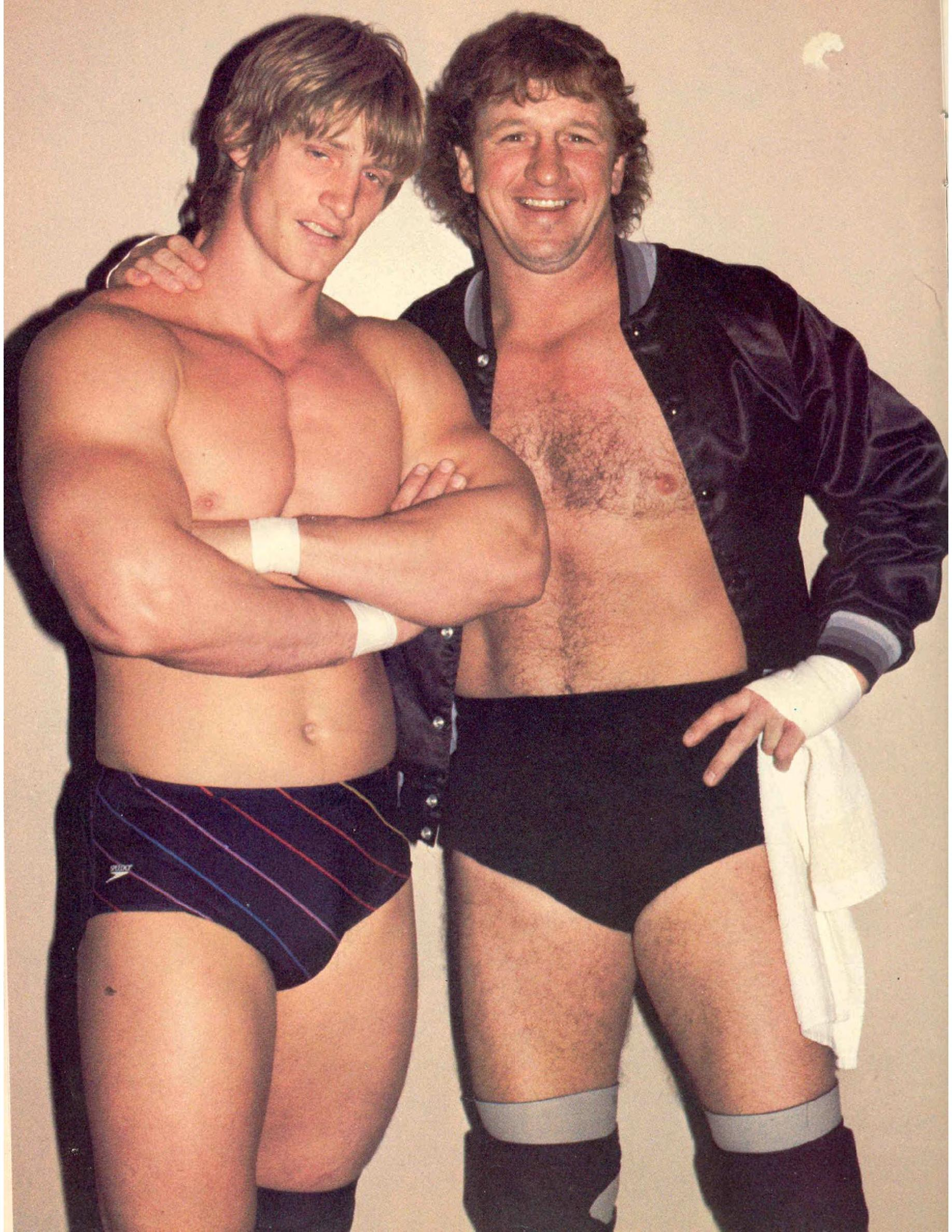
Adkisson alongside fellow Texan wrestler Terry Funk, circa April 1985.

Kevin also had a long feud with Chris Adams that lasted for months and had many violent matches, including two well-known chair shots on each other that required hospitalization for both men. Kevin would also team with Adams on numerous occasions before and after their feud. Away from the ring, Kevin and Chris were close friends; Kevin served as a pallbearer during Adams' funeral in 2001 and traveled to England to visit Adams' family afterwards. In recent interviews, Kevin stated that Adams was the toughest wrestler he had ever wrestled in his career and he showed a great amount of respect for the British-born wrestler. Kevin had several close matches with NWA World Heavyweight Champion Ric Flair, including the main event of the 2nd David Von Erich Memorial Parade of Champions at Texas Stadium, but never won the title.

=== Folding of WCCW and United States Wrestling Association (1989–1990) ===
After the failure of SuperClash III, in 1989, Kevin became very despondent over his father's decision to sell WCCW to Jerry Jarrett, who owned the Memphis-based Continental Wrestling Association (CWA), despite his brother Kerry welcoming Jarrett into the mix; the merged promotions became the United States Wrestling Association (USWA). However, because of disputes, including suing Jarrett himself, he pulled WCCW out of the USWA in 1990, but he could not resurrect the promotion his father built and had no choice but to shut down WCCW that November. Kevin did manage to draw crowds to the Sportatorium in the early going, but with the absence of his brother, manager/booker Gary Hart, and the lack of televised matches, WCCW's survival was very thin. During that time, Kevin competed very little other than wrestling in other independent cards promoted by either himself, Chris Adams, or Gary Hart. Kevin did not participate at all on the August 4, 1989, card in which WCCW formally became USWA Texas, while brother Kerry, who competed on the card earlier, reportedly left the Sportatorium shortly after his match. Kevin, however, did help out a young Steve Austin increase his abilities in the ring during this time, and considers Austin as one of his friends to this day.

=== World Wrestling Federation (1991) ===
Sixteen months after his brother joined the WWF, Kevin wrestled in a dark match on December 2, 1991, at a Wrestling Challenge taping in Corpus Christi, Texas where he faced and defeated Brian Lee.

=== Later career (1991–present) ===
==== Final years and retirement (1991–1995) ====
Kevin competed in Mexico's Consejo Mundial de Lucha Libre (CMLL) in 1991. On April 2, 1993, he teamed up with Chris Adams to defeat Fabulous Freebirds' Michael Hayes and Buddy Roberts at Global Wrestling Federation's Adkisson Benefit Show at the Sportatorium. Kevin's last round of glory occurred on January 7, 1995, while competing for Jim Crockett, Jr.'s NWA promotion based at the Sportatorium where he won the North American Heavyweight Title, defeating Greg Valentine. A week later, he dropped the title to John Hawk. He then formed a very brief alliance with manager Skandor Akbar. Kevin eventually cut back on his ring appearances and formally retired by the end of 1995.

==== Sporadic appearances (2005–2016) ====
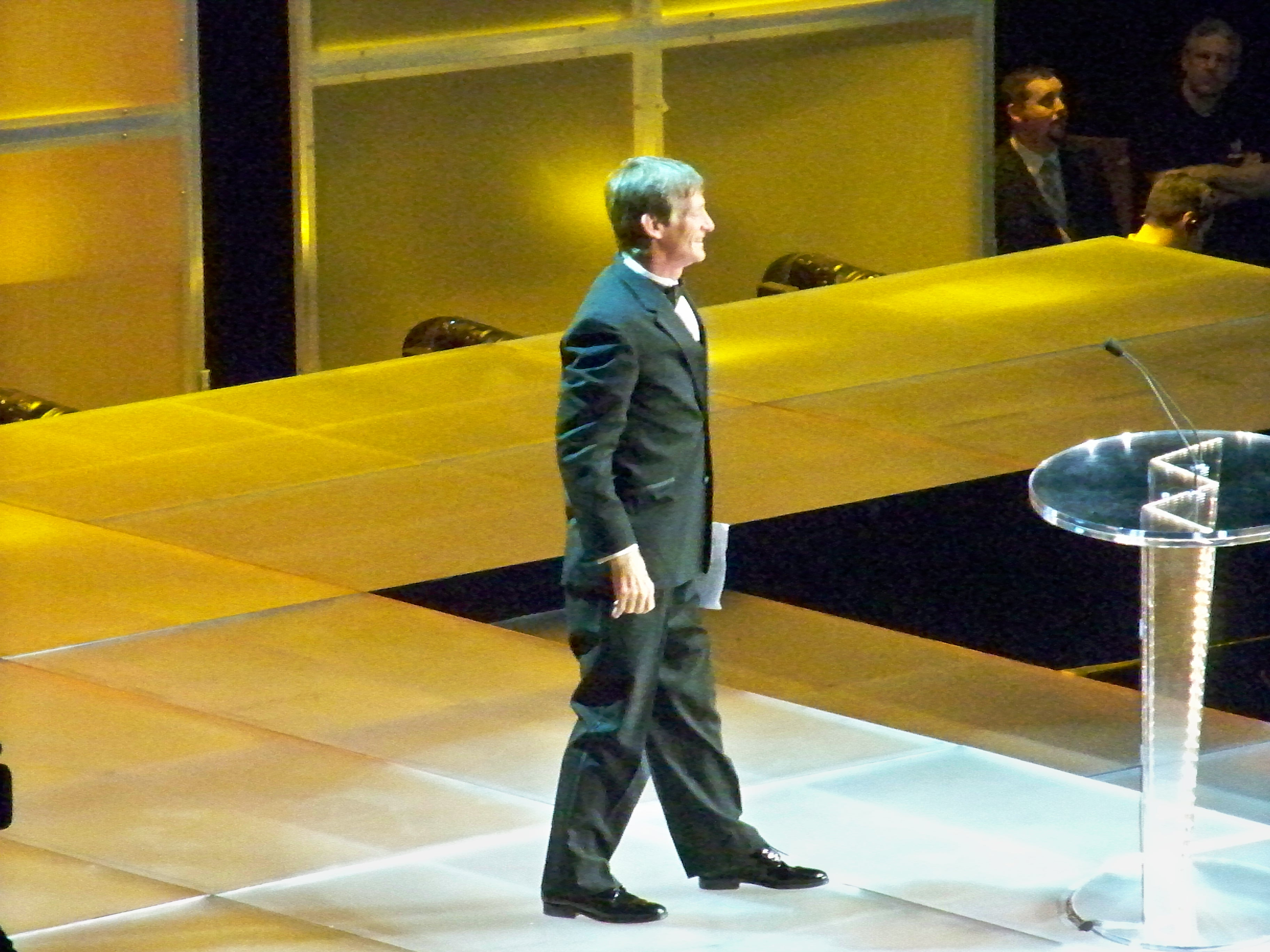
Adkisson at the 2009 WWE Hall of Fame induction ceremony

On October 3, 2005, three years after the WWF had been renamed to World Wrestling Entertainment (WWE), Kevin made an appearance on the WWE Raw: Homecoming show alongside other WWE Hall of Famers. Later that night, as Dusty Rhodes and the WWE Hall of Famers were gathered in the ring, Rob Conway came out and interrupted Rhodes. This eventually led to Conway's beatdown by several Hall of Famers, in which Kevin used the legendary Iron Claw on Conway to the raves of the partisan Dallas crowd. Jim Ross said afterwards that he never thought he would live to see the Iron Claw again. On January 20, 2006, Kevin and his son Ross Adkisson (billed as Ross Von Erich) appeared on a local wrestling card in Longview, Texas as guests of Roddy Piper's Piper's Pit. During the segment, in which Kevin and Piper talked about going to the Sportatorium as teenagers, Skandor Akbar interrupted the interview to berate both Kevin and Ross. At one point, Akbar pushed Ross, which prompted Kevin to apply the Iron Claw on Akbar. Greg Valentine then pulled Akbar away, with Kevin, Ross, Piper, and The Grappler taking in the cheers of the crowd. In 2006, Kevin and a number of others from WCCW's heyday participated in Heroes of World Class Wrestling, an independently produced retrospective documentary about the promotion and the Von Erich family. The documentary featured comments from Adkisson, Gary Hart, Skandor Akbar, Bill Mercer, Mickey Grant, David Manning, Marc Lowrance, and via earlier interviews, Chris Adams.

Later that October, he sold the rights to the WCCW name and tape archives (pre-1988) to WWE, which subsequently began broadcasting WCCW's syndicated programming on their subscription video on demand service, WWE Classics On Demand, with Kevin and Michael "P.S." Hayes acting as hosts. WCCW footage was later uploaded to the online streaming service, the WWE Network, which launched in 2014. WWE also produced The Triumph and Tragedy of World Class in 2007, their own documentary on the territory. Kevin was also featured in the 2007 WWE produced DVD The Most Powerful Families in Wrestling in a segment on the Von Erich family. On April 4, 2009, Kevin represented the Von Erich family as they were inducted into the WWE Hall of Fame Class of 2009 by Michael Hayes. On June 15, 2014, at Total Nonstop Action Wrestling's (TNA) Slammiversary XII, Kevin accompanied his sons Marshall and Ross to the ring for a tag team match. On April 2, 2016, Kevin appeared at the WWE Hall of Fame ceremony to discuss his relationship with The Fabulous Freebirds.

==== One night return (2017) ====
At 60 years of age, Kevin returned to wrestling for the first time in 22 years on July 9, 2017. He teamed with his sons Marshall and Ross as they defeated Marty Jannetty, Jumping Lee, and Gery Roif at The Rage Wrestling Mega Show in Tel Aviv, Israel.

==== All Elite Wrestling (2023–present) ====
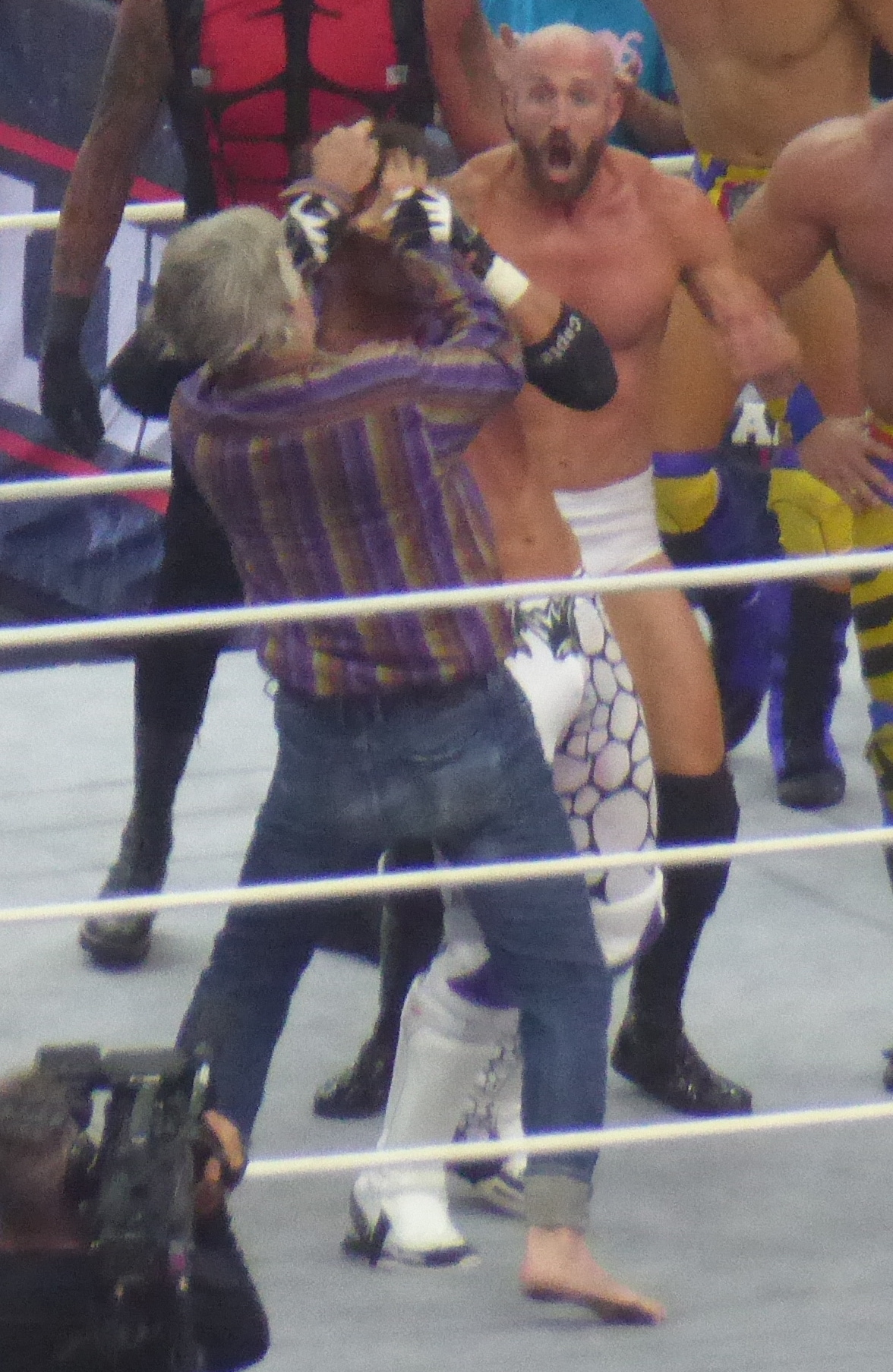
Von Erich delivering the Iron Claw to Matt Taven at All In in August 2024

On December 13, 2023, Kevin appeared with his sons Marshall and Ross on episodes of All Elite Wrestling's (AEW) Dynamite and Rampage, as well as for AEW's sister promotion Ring of Honor (ROH). He then appeared at AEW's Battle of the Belts XI on July 27, 2024, where he accompanied Marshall and Ross, who teamed with Dustin Rhodes, for a six-man tag team match in which they won the ROH World Six-Man Tag Team Championship. On July 10, 2025, Marshall and Ross confirmed that Kevin had signed a "Legends" deal with AEW. AEW president Tony Khan later confirmed that Kevin would be working in AEW as a coach.

== Personal life ==
On August 1, 1980, Kevin married Pam Adkisson; the couple lives in the Dallas area and runs a family investment business together. They have four children, including Marshall and Ross. Kevin also dabbles in commercial real estate and owns the rights to Southwest Sports (the distributor of World Class Championship Wrestling), now known as K.R. Adkisson Enterprises.

Kevin is the last surviving child of wrestler Fritz Von Erich. He was the second-born son. Kevin had four brothers who wrestled: David, Kerry, Mike, and Chris. His older brother Jack Barton Adkisson, Jr., born September 21, 1952, died at the age of six in Niagara Falls, New York on March 7, 1959, after stepping on a trailer tongue; Jack received an electric shock.

== Other media ==
Adkisson, as Kevin Von Erich, appears in the video games Legends of Wrestling, Legends of Wrestling II, Showdown: Legends of Wrestling, WWE 2K17, and WWE 2K18.

A biopic feature film titled The Iron Claw, starring Zac Efron as Kevin, was released on December 22, 2023.

== Championships and accomplishments ==
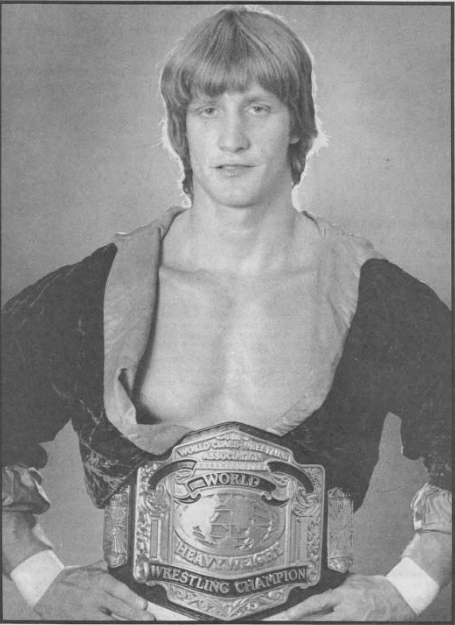
Adkisson as WCWA World Heavyweight Champion, c. 1987

- All Japan Pro Wrestling
  - All Asia Tag Team Championship (1 time) - with David Von Erich
- Cauliflower Alley Club
  - Art Abrams Lifetime Achievement/Lou Thesz Award (2017)
- NWA Big Time Wrestling / World Class Championship Wrestling / World Class Wrestling Association
  - NWA American Heavyweight Championship (5 times)
  - NWA American Tag Team Championship (4 times) - with David Von Erich (1), El Halcon (1), and Kerry Von Erich (2)
  - NWA Texas Tag Team Championship (2 times) - with David Von Erich
  - NWA World Six-Man Tag Team Championship (Texas version) (7 times) - with David and Kerry Von Erich (2), Fritz Von Erich and Mike Von Erich (1), Kerry Von Erich and Mike Von Erich (3), and Kerry Von Erich and Brian Adias (1)
  - NWA World Tag Team Championship (1 time) - with David Von Erich
  - WCCW Television Championship (1 time)
  - WCWA Texas Heavyweight Championship (2 times)
  - WCWA World Heavyweight Championship (1 time)
  - WCWA World Six-Man Tag Team Championship (4 times) - with Kerry Von Erich and Lance Von Erich (1), Mike Von Erich and Lance Von Erich (1), Chris Adams and Steve Simpson (1), and Kerry Von Erich and Michael Hayes (1)
  - WCWA World Tag Team Championship (3 times) - with Kerry Von Erich
- NWA Southwest
  - NWA North American Heavyweight Championship (1 time)
- Pro Wrestling Illustrated
  - Ranked No. 78 of the top 500 singles wrestlers in the PWI 500 in 1991
  - Ranked No. 85 of the top 500 singles wrestlers of the "PWI Years" in 2003
  - Ranked No. 23 of the top 100 tag teams of the "PWI Years" with David, Mike, and Kerry Von Erich in 2003
- St. Louis Wrestling Club
  - NWA Missouri Heavyweight Championship (1 time)
- St. Louis Wrestling Hall of Fame
  - Class of 2016
- Western States Sports
  - NWA Western States Tag Team Championship (1 time) - with David Von Erich
- WWE
  - WWE Hall of Fame (Class of 2009) as a member of the Von Erich family
- Wrestling Observer Newsletter
  - Match of the Year (1984) with Mike and Kerry Von Erich vs. the Fabulous Freebirds (Buddy Roberts, Michael Hayes, and Terry Gordy) in an Anything Goes match on July 4

== See also ==
- Von Erich family
- List of barefooters
