= David Von Erich =

American professional wrestler (1958–1984)

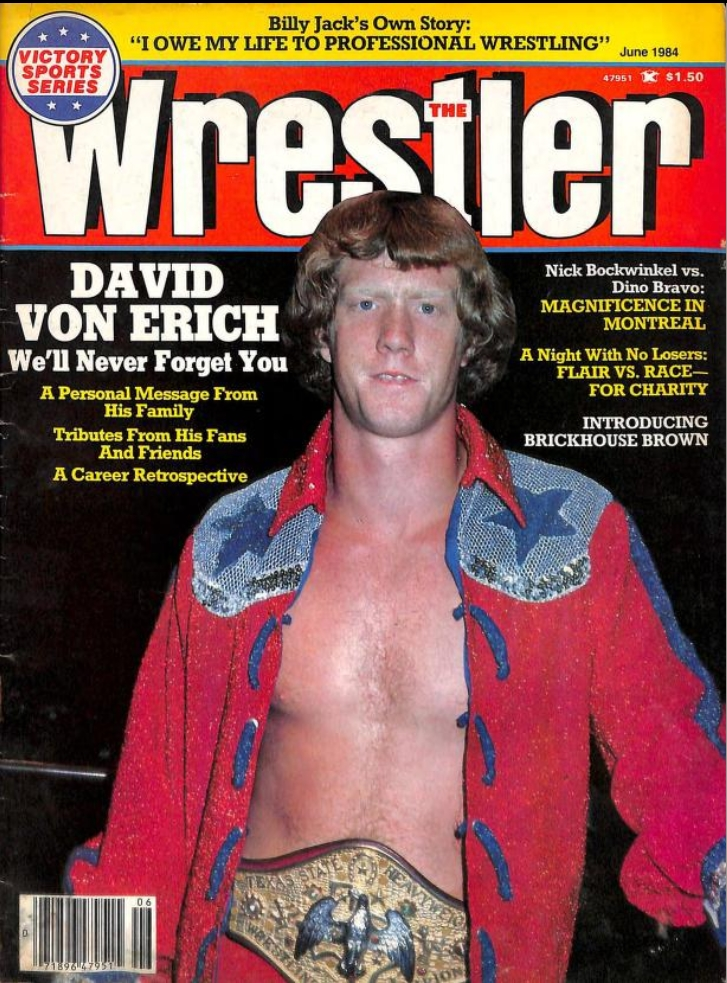
- Von Erich appeared posthumously on the cover of the June 1984 edition of The Wrestler magazine

Personal information
- Born: David Alan Adkisson; July 22, 1958 Lake Dallas, Texas, U.S.
- Died: February 10, 1984 (aged 25) Tokyo, Japan
- Cause of death: Acute enteritis
- Spouses: Candy McLeod (m. 1978; div. 1979) Trisha Matter (m. 1982)
- Children: 1
- Family: Von Erich

Professional wrestling career
- Ring name: David Von Erich
- Billed height: 6 ft 6 in (198 cm)
- Billed weight: 230 lb (104 kg)
- Billed from: Dallas, Texas; Lake Dallas, Texas; Shady Shores, Texas
- Trained by: Fritz Von Erich
- Debut: June 28, 1977

David Alan Adkisson (July 22, 1958 – February 10, 1984) was an American professional wrestler, better known by the ring name David Von Erich. A member of the Von Erich family, he is best known for his appearances with World Class Championship Wrestling, the professional wrestling promotion in Dallas owned by his father, Fritz Von Erich, a professional wrestler.

== Early life and education ==
Adkisson was named after his mother Doris' brother Eugene David Smith, who died of a brain tumor at 14, several months before David Adkisson was born in 1958. David and his brothers, Kevin and Kerry, loved to hunt and fish with their father. Hunting on the Von Erich ranch was quite an event. Many of their relatives and friends joined and sometimes the hunting group would be 20 or more; WCCW referee David Manning and WCCW announcer Bill Mercer often were among the group. Adkisson's first love in life was raising horses, which turned out to be very profitable for him. He raised and sold quarter horses and horses for show and made his own fortune that way, apart from the family business of wrestling.

Adkisson was a high school basketball star and a football player at Lake Dallas High School in Corinth, Texas. He won a scholarship to North Texas State University in Denton to play basketball and football. He dropped out to pursue a professional wrestling career.

== Professional wrestling career ==
=== Early career (1977–1981) ===
Adkisson made his professional wrestling debut in June 1977, adopting the name "David Von Erich". He was considered a breakout star of his family, as his fiery temper produced memorable interviews. His first major match came just a few weeks later on August 15, 1977, when he wrestled NWA World Heavyweight Champion Harley Race to a 30-minute draw in a two out of three falls match. Von Erich made his first appearance with the St. Louis Wrestling Club in Missouri in early-1979 and was an instant hit with the fans and the promoters. Due to his popularity at the time, on May 27, 1979, David again wrestled NWA World Heavyweight Champion Race in Missouri in a non-title match and defeated him with the Iron Claw.

In November 1979, Von Erich made his first and only appearance in the World Wrestling Federation (WWF), competing on a card against Davey O'Hannon at Madison Square Garden in Midtown Manhattan, New York. In the early years of his career, Von Erich had several reigns as NWA Texas Heavyweight Champion and NWA Texas Tag Team Champion, as well as holding the All Asia Tag Team Championship, NWA American Tag Team Championship, and Texas version of the NWA World Tag Team Championship.

=== All Japan Pro Wrestling (1979, 1981) ===
In May and June 1979, Von Erich made his debut in Japan for All Japan Pro Wrestling (AJPW), taking part in that year's "Super Power Series". Teaming with Kevin Von Erich, he competed primarily in the tag team division. On June 5, 1979, the Von Erichs unsuccessfully challenged Great Kojika and Motoshi Okuma for the All Asia Tag Team Championship in a two out of three falls match.

Von Erich returned to AJPW in May and June 1981, again as part of its "Super Power Series". In his first match, he wrestled Kintarō Ōki to a double count out. On May 23, 1981, he and Kevin Von Erich defeated Kojika and Okuma for the All Asia Tag Team Championship in Tokyo's Korakuen Hall. They held the titles until the final night of their tour on June 11, 1981, when they lost to Akio Sato and Takashi Ishikawa in Korakuen Hall.

=== Championship Wrestling from Florida (1981–1982) ===
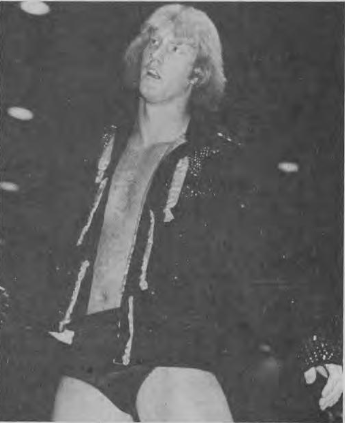
Von Erich, c. 1982

In late-1981, David left Texas and struck out on his own, heading to Florida and competing as a heel for Championship Wrestling from Florida. In Florida, David was managed by J. J. Dillon and was in the same stable as Kendo Nagasaki and Jimmy Garvin. David's mentor in Florida was Dory Funk Jr. and during that time David teamed with Dory or his brother Terry Funk in addition to singles competition. Memorable opponents included Barry Windham, Mr. Wrestling II, Eric Embry, Sweet Brown Sugar, and Butch Reed. Kerry Von Erich later joined his brother on the heel side in Florida, playing a vain self-absorbed muscleman alongside David's loudmouthed "spoiled brat" persona. By July 1982, David was back in Texas.

=== World Class Championship Wrestling (1982–1984) ===
==== Feud with Gorgeous Jimmy Garvin (1983) ====
During his stay in Florida, David met and became great friends with Jimmy Garvin, convincing Garvin to come to World Class Championship Wrestling (WCCW) in Texas in early 1983. The duo created an angle for a feud between them, which culminated with David winning the held-up NWA Texas Heavyweight Championship at The Tarrant County Convention Center on July 4, 1983. As a result of David's victory, Garvin and his valet Sunshine were forced to serve as David's valets for a day, with the results of the day being broadcast on the WCCW weekly show. The whole angle was conceived by David and Jimmy. They traded the Texas title back and forth several times, then that belt was held up several times and when the feud reached its climax on July 4, 1983; it was time for both men to move on to the next part in their career (David continuing the Von Erich feud with The Freebirds and Garvin starting a feud with Chris Adams).

==== Feud with The Freebirds (1982–1984) ====
In the fall of 1982, David was also working behind the scenes in WCCW and helped create several angles. He invited the Fabulous Freebirds to come to WCCW. Michael Hayes made his debut at the Sportatorium on Saturday, October 16, 1982, and Terry Gordy made his debut at the Sportatorium two weeks later, on October 30, 1982. Buddy Roberts did not show up. The Freebirds were initially booked as faces in the run-up to the Christmas spectacular "Wrestling Star Wars" card at Reunion Arena on December 25, 1982.

In the final match to crown the first-ever Six-Man Champions, David took Buddy Roberts' place in the Freebirds against Tom Sharpe, Mike Sharpe & Ben Steel. It was David who won that match and the title, but in a ringside interview right after the bout, David gave his third of the title to Buddy Roberts. Later that evening, David's brother Kerry battled NWA World Champion Ric Flair in a Steel Cage with Michael Hayes and David Manning as the referees. During the match, Hayes knocked out Flair and attempted to hand the pin (and World Title) to Von Erich, but turned on Kerry when he refused the tainted victory and as Kerry tried to leave the cage, Gordy slammed the cage door on Kerry's head. Thus the Von Erich/Freebird feud was born.

David took part in many matches against the Freebirds in 1983 and early 1984. Notable bouts include David vs Terry Gordy in a Handcuff Match on April 1, 1983, at "Wrestling Star Wars", David, Kevin & Kerry defeating the Freebirds on July 4, 1983, in Ft. Worth at "Star Wars" and what would be David's next-to-last match was against Terry Gordy on February 3, 1984. On the same day, David defeated Hayes to win the NWA United National Championship, his last title ever. This title is now part of All Japan Pro Wrestling's Triple Crown Heavyweight Championship.

==== Feud with Ric Flair (1983–1984) ====
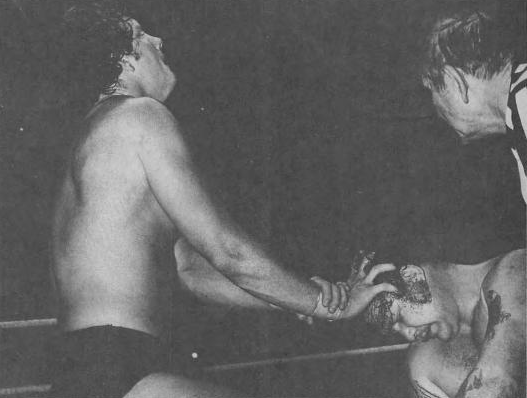
Von Erich (left) applies the Iron Claw to Harley Race (right, bottom), c. 1983

David won the NWA Missouri Heavyweight Championship from Ric Flair on September 16, 1983, holding the championship until losing it to Harley Race on January 6, 1984. Many within the industry believe that David's reign with the belt was his final step to winning the NWA World Heavyweight Championship, as the NWA Championship Committee supposedly voted in January 1984 for David to win it from Ric Flair in March or April of that year. An angle between David and Ric Flair was started when David battled Flair at Reunion Arena on December 25, 1983, and Flair retained the NWA World Championship. Immediately afterward, on December 31, 1983, on the NWA television broadcast, Ric Flair did an interview where he commented on how Mike Von Erich was not a good wrestler and he could beat Mike in 60 seconds with one hand tied behind his back.

In an interview in Ft. Worth on January 9, 1984, David did possibly his most intense interview ever, telling Flair that he had heard Flair's comments about Mike and that he had a proposition. Mike would wrestle Flair in a "10 Minute Challenge Match" and if Flair beat Mike in that 10 minutes, David would never again ask for another shot at the NWA World title, but if Flair did not beat Mike in those 10 minutes, David would get to name the place, the time and every stipulation for his match against Ric Flair. The "10 Minute Challenge match" between Ric Flair and Mike Von Erich was held at WCCW Wrestling Star Wars at the Tarrant County Convention Center in Ft. Worth, Texas, on January 30, 1984. Flair was unable to pin Mike in the 10 minutes and as a result, David won the challenge. A week later on February 6, 1984, in Ft. Worth, in what would turn out to be his last interview, David Von Erich expressed his happiness over Mike lasting 10 minutes with Ric Flair and said that now he (David) would get to name every single stipulation in David's return match with Flair. The big match was to be held sometime in about April 1984, after David was to return to Texas at the end of February and he and Flair would have a chance to build the match up even more. His last match was defeating Kamala by DQ in Ardmore, Oklahoma on February 7.

== Professional wrestling style and persona ==
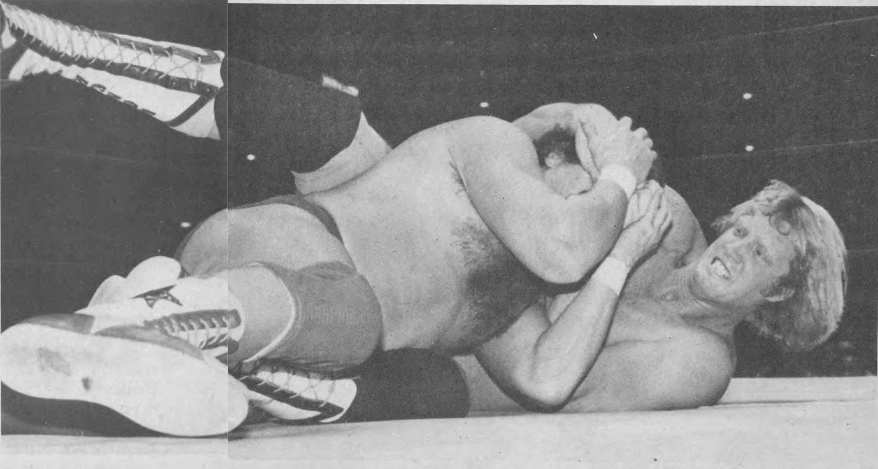
Von Erich applying an iron claw on Mike Graham in a 1982 match

Von Erich was nicknamed "the Yellow Rose of Texas". His signature moves were the "Iron Claw" (a clawhold) and the "Dream Machine" (a sleeper hold).

== Personal life ==
David's first marriage was with Candy L. McLeod. They were wed on June 26, 1978, in Denton, Texas and they had a daughter, Natosha Zoeanna Adkisson (October 19, 1978 –December 29, 1978). Natosha died of SIDS at 13 weeks old. Shortly after, David separated from his wife and they were officially divorced on July 12, 1979. David and Patricia A. Matter, known as Trisha, married on June 8, 1982; it was David's second marriage. The couple was married until David's death. Trisha was interviewed for the June 1984 edition of The Wrestler magazine, which was a tribute to David. She spoke of how she loved the fans and thanked them for their support. Trisha has remained out of the public eye since that interview.

== Death ==
Von Erich died at the outset of a third tour of Japan with All Japan Pro Wrestling on February 10, 1984, before defending the United National championship belt he had won in Texas seven days earlier. The Von Erichs state that his death was caused by ruptured intestines resulting from acute enteritis, which is the documented cause of death listed on the Consular Report of Death provided by the U.S. embassy in Japan after an autopsy was performed. A theory about his death, which has never been confirmed by anyone, is that it was a painkiller overdose, perhaps hydrocodone. Ric Flair mentions in To Be the Man, his autobiography, that Bruiser Brody (Von Erich's long-time friend) removed the evidence of any drug-related incident. In the documentary Heroes of World Class: The Story of the Von Erichs and The Triumph and Tragedy of World Class Championship Wrestling, Kevin Von Erich and former referee David Manning both attested to a heart attack theory, however, in the Dark Side of the Ring episode covering the Von Erich family, Kevin reaffirmed that it was acute enteritis.

== Championships and accomplishments ==
- All Japan Pro Wrestling
  - All Asia Tag Team Championship (1 time) – with Kevin Von Erich
- Championship Wrestling from Florida
  - NWA Florida Television Championship (1 time)
  - NWA North American Tag Team Championship (Florida version) (1 time) – with Dory Funk Jr.
  - NWA Southern Heavyweight Championship (Florida version) (1 time)
- NWA Big Time Wrestling / World Class Championship Wrestling
  - NWA American Tag Team Championship (1 time) – with Kevin Von Erich
  - NWA Texas Heavyweight Championship (8 times)
  - NWA Texas Tag Team Championship (2 times) – with Kevin Von Erich
  - NWA United National Championship (1 time)
  - NWA World Six-Man Tag Team Championship (Texas version) (2 times) – with Kevin Von Erich and Kerry Von Erich
  - NWA World Tag Team Championship (1 time) – with Kevin Von Erich
- NWA Western States Sports
  - NWA Western States Tag Team Championship (1 time) - with Kevin Von Erich
- Pro Wrestling Illustrated
  - Stanley Weston Award (1984)
  - PWI ranked him #58 of the top 500 singles wrestlers of the "PWI Years" in 2003
  - PWI ranked him #23 of the top 100 tag teams of the "PWI Years" with Mike, Kevin, and Kerry Von Erich in 2003
- St. Louis Wrestling Club
  - NWA Missouri Heavyweight Championship (1 time)
- St. Louis Wrestling Hall of Fame
  - Class of 2016
- World Wrestling Entertainment
  - WWE Hall of Fame (Class of 2009)

== See also ==
- Von Erich Family
- List of premature professional wrestling deaths
