= List of Pro Wrestling Illustrated awards =

Professional wrestling awards

This is a list of both active and inactive Pro Wrestling Illustrated awards which are voted on by Pro Wrestling Illustrated (PWI) readers every year from 1972 onwards, expanding to more categories in later years.

Unlike other wrestling magazines and websites, PWI is largely a magazine written within the fictional realm of professional wrestling and the awards recognize this.

== Active awards ==
=== Wrestler of the Year ===
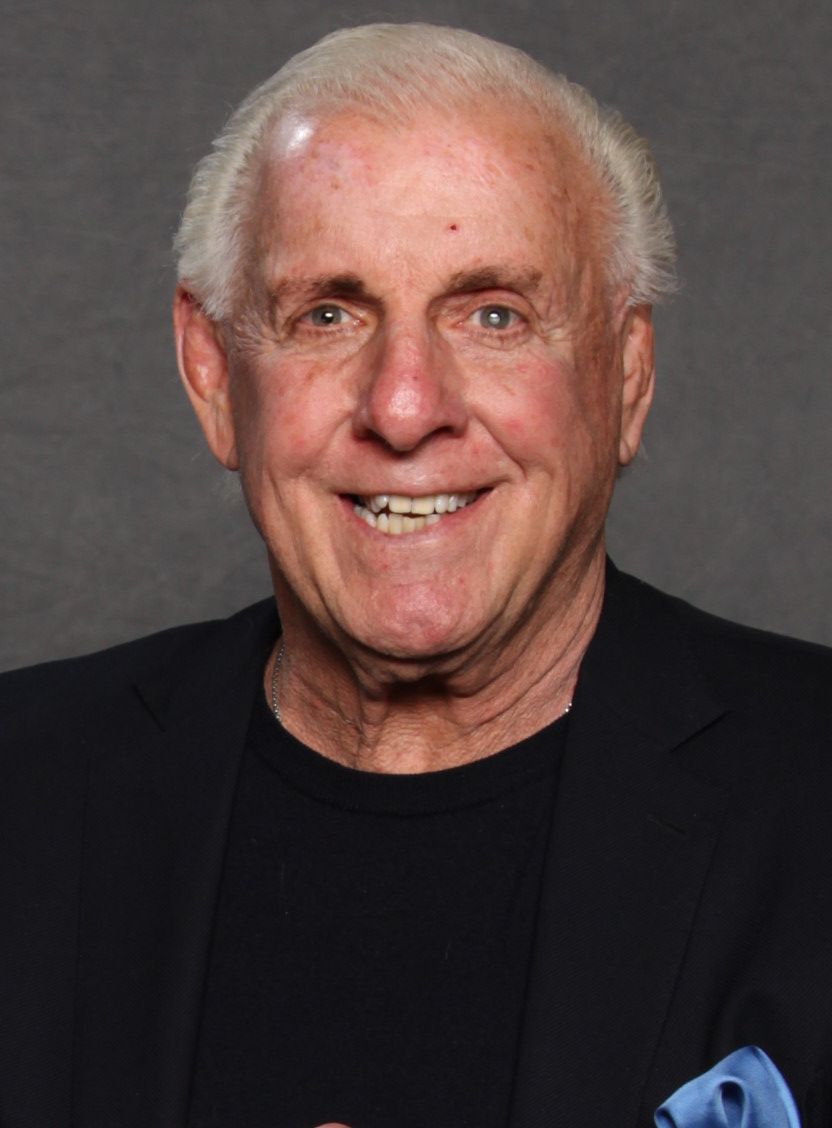
Ric Flair is a six-time winner of the category

The PWI Wrestler of the Year award recognizes the best professional wrestler of the year. Ric Flair has won the award a record six times, and remains the only wrestler with more than three wins; he also established the record for most consecutive wins with three from 1984 to 1986, with AJ Styles later tying that record in 2016–2018. Since 2020, female wrestlers have been included in the following category.

Year	Winner	Runner-up	Second runner-up	Third runner-up
1972	Pedro Morales	—N/a	—N/a	—N/a
1973	Jack Brisco	—N/a	—N/a	—N/a
1974	Bruno Sammartino	—N/a	—N/a	—N/a
1975	Mr. Wrestling II	—N/a	—N/a	—N/a
1976	Terry Funk	Bruno Sammartino	Nick Bockwinkel	Paul Jones
1977	Dusty Rhodes	Superstar Billy Graham	Bob Backlund	Harley Race
1978	Dusty Rhodes (2)	Bob Backlund	Ricky Steamboat	Harley Race
1979	Harley Race	Dusty Rhodes	Jimmy Snuka	Bob Backlund
1980	Bob Backlund	Harley Race	Verne Gagne	The Iron Sheik
1981	Ric Flair	Bob Backlund	Tommy Rich	Dusty Rhodes
1982	Bob Backlund (2)	Ric Flair	Hulk Hogan	Jimmy Snuka
1983	Harley Race (2)	Nick Bockwinkel	André the Giant	Bob Backlund
1984	Ric Flair (2)	Hulk Hogan	Kerry Von Erich	Rick Martel
1985	Ric Flair (3)	Hulk Hogan	Rick Martel	Sgt. Slaughter
1986	Ric Flair (4)	Hulk Hogan	Randy Savage	Nikita Koloff
1987	Hulk Hogan	Ric Flair	Randy Savage	Steve Williams
1988	Randy Savage	Jerry Lawler	Lex Luger	Ric Flair
1989	Ric Flair (5)	Hulk Hogan	Lex Luger	Ricky Steamboat
1990	Sting	Ultimate Warrior	Hulk Hogan	Lex Luger
1991	Hulk Hogan (2)	Lex Luger	Bret Hart	Sting
1992	Ric Flair (6)	Ron Simmons	Rick Rude	Bret Hart
1993	Vader	Bret Hart	Shawn Michaels	Yokozuna
1994	Hulk Hogan (3)	Bret Hart	Razor Ramon	Ric Flair
1995	Diesel	Shawn Michaels	Sting	Hulk Hogan
1996	The Giant	Shawn Michaels	Ric Flair	Ahmed Johnson
1997	Lex Luger	Stone Cold Steve Austin	The Undertaker	Diamond Dallas Page
1998	Stone Cold Steve Austin	Goldberg	Diamond Dallas Page	The Rock
1999	Stone Cold Steve Austin (2)	The Rock	Sting	Taz
2000	The Rock	Triple H	Booker T	Kurt Angle
2001	Stone Cold Steve Austin (3)	Kurt Angle	The Rock	Rob Van Dam
2002	Brock Lesnar	Rob Van Dam	Triple H	The Undertaker
2003	Kurt Angle	Brock Lesnar	Triple H	A.J. Styles
2004	Chris Benoit	Randy Orton	Eddie Guerrero	A.J. Styles
2005	Batista	John Cena	A.J. Styles	Samoa Joe
2006	John Cena	Samoa Joe	Rey Mysterio	Edge
2007	John Cena (2)	Kurt Angle	Batista	Randy Orton
2008	Triple H	Kurt Angle	Randy Orton	Samoa Joe
2009	Randy Orton	John Cena	Chris Jericho	Kurt Angle
2010	Randy Orton (2)	Rob Van Dam	John Cena	Sheamus
2011	CM Punk	John Cena	Davey Richards	Bobby Roode
2012	CM Punk (2)	Sheamus	Austin Aries	John Cena
2013	Daniel Bryan	John Cena	Bully Ray	Randy Orton
2014	Brock Lesnar (2)	Daniel Bryan	A.J. Styles	John Cena
2015	Seth Rollins	Jay Lethal	Roman Reigns	John Cena
2016	A.J. Styles	Roman Reigns	Kevin Owens	Dean Ambrose
2017	A.J. Styles (2)	Kazuchika Okada	Kenny Omega	Cody
2018	A.J. Styles (3)	Kenny Omega	Cody	Seth Rollins
2019	Adam Cole	Chris Jericho	Seth Rollins	Kofi Kingston
2020	Jon Moxley	Bayley	Chris Jericho	Sasha Banks
2021	Kenny Omega	Roman Reigns	Bianca Belair	Big E
2022	Roman Reigns	Jon Moxley	Bianca Belair	Cody Rhodes
2023	Seth Rollins (2)	Gunther	Will Ospreay	MJF
2024	Cody Rhodes	Gunther	Will Ospreay	Bryan Danielson
2025	Cody Rhodes (2)	Mercedes Moné	Adam Page	CM Punk

=== Woman of the Year ===
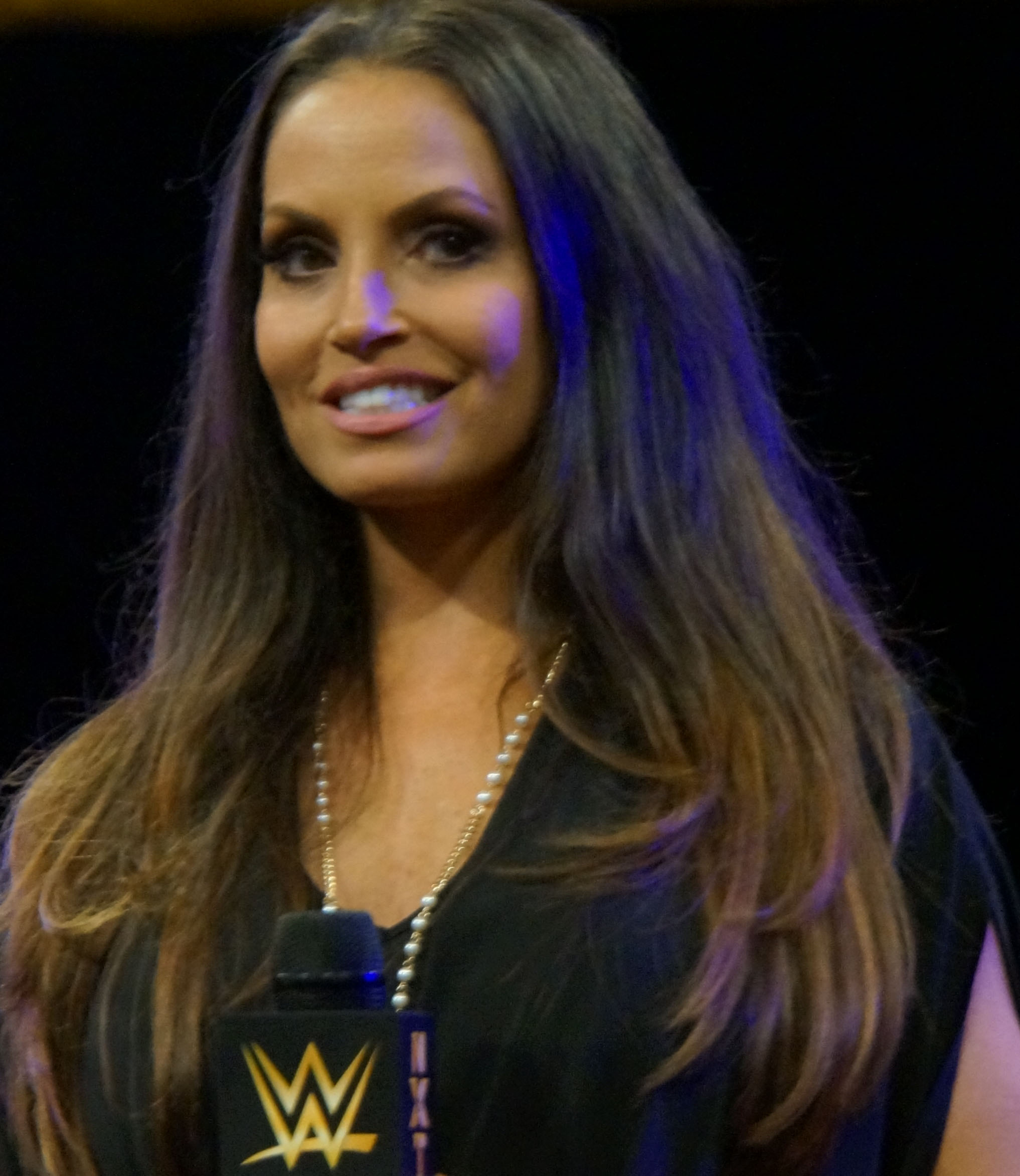
Trish Stratus is a four-time winner of the category

The PWI Woman of the Year award recognized the best female professional wrestling personality of the year. Originally known as Girl Wrestler of the Year, it was rendered defunct in 1976 and its history would be subsumed into the current award when women have again bestowed their category in 2000. The award went on hiatus in 2020, and several female wrestlers were nominated for Wrestler of the Year but the award returned again in 2021. Trish Stratus has won this award a record four times. AJ Lee is the only wrestler to win the award three times consecutively.

Year	Winner	Runner-up	Second runner-up	Third runner-up
1972	Marie LaVerne	—N/a	—N/a	—N/a
1973	Joyce Grable	—N/a	—N/a	—N/a
1974	Rachel Dubois	—N/a	—N/a	—N/a
1975	Ann Casey	—N/a	—N/a	—N/a
1976	Sue Green	Kitty Adams	Early Dawn	Vicki Williams
2000	Stephanie McMahon	Lita	Chyna	Major Gunns
2001	Lita	Stephanie McMahon	Stacy Keibler	Torrie Wilson
2002	Trish Stratus	Stephanie McMahon	Stacy Keibler	Torrie Wilson
2003	Trish Stratus (2)	Stephanie McMahon	Victoria	Torrie Wilson
2004	Victoria	Trish Stratus	Stacy Keibler	Molly Holly
2005	Trish Stratus (3)	Christy Hemme	Melina	Lita
2006	Trish Stratus (4)	Dixie Carter	Mickie James	Lita
2007	Candice Michelle	Beth Phoenix	Gail Kim	Karen Angle
2008	Awesome Kong	Beth Phoenix	Mickie James	Michelle McCool
2009	Mickie James	Angelina Love	Tara	Michelle McCool
2010	Michelle McCool	Angelina Love	Madison Rayne	Madison Eagles
2011	Mickie James (2)	Kelly Kelly	Beth Phoenix	Madison Eagles
2012	AJ Lee	Gail Kim	Eve Torres	Sara Del Rey
2013	AJ Lee (2)	Cheerleader Melissa	Dixie Carter	Kaitlyn
2014	AJ Lee (3)	Paige	Stephanie McMahon	Jessicka Havok
2015	Sasha Banks	Nikki Bella	Charlotte	Paige
2016	Charlotte Flair	Sasha Banks	Bayley	Becky Lynch
2017	Asuka	Alexa Bliss	Charlotte Flair	Sienna
2018	Becky Lynch	Ronda Rousey	Asuka	Tessa Blanchard
2019	Becky Lynch (2)	Tessa Blanchard	Shayna Baszler	Brandi Rhodes
2021	Britt Baker	Bianca Belair	Mickie James	Deonna Purrazzo
2022	Bianca Belair	Jade Cargill	Thunder Rosa	Britt Baker
2023	Rhea Ripley	Toni Storm	Bianca Belair	Athena
2024	Toni Storm	Liv Morgan	Rhea Ripley	Jordynne Grace
2025	Mercedes Moné (2) (Note: Moné previously won the award as Sasha Banks.)	Toni Storm	Stephanie Vaquer	Iyo Sky

=== Tag Team of the Year ===
The PWI Tag Team of the Year award recognizes the best tag team of the year. The Road Warriors (Animal & Hawk) have won a record four times. The New Day is the only trio to win the award.

Year	Winner	Runner-up	Second runner-up	Third runner-up
1972	Dick the Bruiser & The Crusher	—N/a	—N/a	—N/a
1973	Nick Bockwinkel & Ray Stevens	—N/a	—N/a	—N/a
1974	Jimmy Valiant & Johnny Valiant	—N/a	—N/a	—N/a
1975	Gene Anderson & Ole Anderson	—N/a	—N/a	—N/a
1976	The Executioners (#1 & #2)	Gene Anderson & Ole Anderson	Chief Jay Strongbow & Billy White Wolf	Jimmy Valiant & Johnny Valiant
1977	Gene Anderson & Ole Anderson (2)	Professor Tanaka & Mr. Fuji	Greg Gagne & Jim Brunzell	Ric Flair & Greg Valentine
1978	Ricky Steamboat & Paul Jones	The Yukon Lumberjacks (Yukon Eric & Yukon Pierre)	Mike Graham & Steve Keirn	Greg Gagne & Jim Brunzell
1979	Ivan Putski & Tito Santana	Jerry & Johnny Valiant	Paul Jones & Baron von Raschke	The Spoiler & Mark Lewin
1980	Jimmy Snuka & Ray Stevens	Mr. Wrestling & Mr. Wrestling II	The Wild Samoans (Afa & Sika)	Verne Gagne & Mad Dog Vachon
1981	The Fabulous Freebirds (Michael Hayes & Terry Gordy)	Rick Martel & Tony Garea	Mr. Fuji & Mr. Saito	Greg Gagne & Jim Brunzell
1982	The High Flyers (Greg Gagne & Jim Brunzell)	Mr. Fuji & Mr. Saito	The Fabulous Freebirds (Michael Hayes, Terry Gordy & Buddy Roberts)	Ole Anderson & Stan Hansen
1983	The Road Warriors (Hawk & Animal)	Kerry, Kevin & David Von Erich	The Fabulous Freebirds (Michael Hayes, Terry Gordy & Buddy Roberts)	Jack Brisco & Jerry Brisco
1984	The Road Warriors (2) (Hawk & Animal)	Kerry, Kevin & Mike Von Erich	The Fabulous Ones (Stan Lane & Steve Keirn)	The Rock 'n' Roll Express (Ricky Morton & Robert Gibson)
1985	The Road Warriors (3) (Hawk & Animal)	Ted DiBiase & Steve Williams	Ivan & Nikita Koloff	The British Bulldogs (Davey Boy Smith & Dynamite Kid)
1986	The Rock 'n' Roll Express (Ricky Morton & Robert Gibson)	The Road Warriors (Hawk & Animal)	The British Bulldogs (Davey Boy Smith & Dynamite Kid)	The Midnight Rockers (Shawn Michaels & Marty Jannetty)
1987	The Midnight Express (Bobby Eaton & Stan Lane)	The Hart Foundation (Bret Hart & Jim Neidhart)	The Road Warriors (Hawk & Animal)	The Rock 'n' Roll Express (Ricky Morton & Robert Gibson)
1988	The Road Warriors (4) (Hawk & Animal)	The Midnight Express (Bobby Eaton & Stan Lane)	Demolition (Ax & Smash)	The Brain Busters (Arn Anderson & Tully Blanchard)
1989	The Brain Busters (Arn Anderson & Tully Blanchard)	Demolition (Ax & Smash)	The Road Warriors (Hawk & Animal)	The Fabulous Freebirds (Michael Hayes & Jimmy Garvin)
1990	The Steiner Brothers (Rick Steiner & Scott Steiner)	Demolition (Ax & Smash)	Doom (Ron Simmons & Butch Reed)	The Road Warriors (Hawk & Animal)
1991	The Enforcers (Arn Anderson & Larry Zbyszko)	The Legion of Doom (Hawk & Animal)	The Steiner Brothers (Rick Steiner & Scott Steiner)	Jeff Jarrett & Robert Fuller
1992	The Miracle Violence Connection (Terry Gordy & Steve Williams)	The Natural Disasters (Earthquake & Typhoon)	The Steiner Brothers (Rick Steiner & Scott Steiner)	Barry Windham & Dustin Rhodes
1993	The Steiner Brothers (2) (Rick Steiner & Scott Steiner)	The Hollywood Blonds (Steve Austin & Brian Pillman)	Money Inc. (Ted DiBiase & Irwin R. Schyster)	The Heavenly Bodies (Tom Prichard & Stan Lane)
1994	The Nasty Boys (Brian Knobs & Jerry Sags)	The Headshrinkers (Samu & Fatu)	The Public Enemy (Johnny Grunge & Rocco Rock)	Rock 'n' Roll Express (Ricky Morton & Robert Gibson)
1995	Harlem Heat (Booker T & Stevie Ray)	The Smoking Gunns (Billy & Bart Gunn)	Owen Hart & Yokozuna	The Steiner Brothers (Rick Steiner & Scott Steiner)
1996	Harlem Heat (2) (Booker T & Stevie Ray)	The Eliminators (Perry Saturn & John Kronus)	The Steiner Brothers (Rick Steiner & Scott Steiner)	The Gangstas (New Jack & Mustapha Saed)
1997	The Outsiders (Scott Hall & Kevin Nash)	The Steiner Brothers (Rick Steiner & Scott Steiner)	The Legion of Doom (Hawk & Animal)	Lex Luger & The Giant
1998	The New Age Outlaws (Road Dogg & Billy Gunn)	Rob Van Dam & Sabu	Mankind & Kane	The Brothers of Destruction (The Undertaker & Kane)
1999	Kane & X-Pac	The Hardy Boyz (Matt Hardy & Jeff Hardy)	Harlem Heat (Booker T & Stevie Ray)	The Dudley Boyz (Bubba Ray Dudley & D-Von Dudley)
2000	The Hardy Boyz (Matt Hardy & Jeff Hardy)	Edge & Christian	The Dudley Boyz (Bubba Ray Dudley & D-Von Dudley)	KroniK (Brian Adams & Bryan Clark)
2001	The Dudley Boyz (Bubba Ray Dudley & D-Von Dudley)	The Brothers of Destruction (The Undertaker & Kane)	The Hardy Boyz (Matt Hardy & Jeff Hardy)	The Acolytes (Bradshaw & Faarooq)
2002	Billy & Chuck	Booker T & Goldust	3-Minute Warning (Rosey & Jamal)	Kurt Angle & Chris Benoit
2003	The World's Greatest Tag Team (Charlie Haas & Shelton Benjamin)	America's Most Wanted (James Storm & Chris Harris)	The Dudley Boyz (Bubba Ray Dudley & D-Von Dudley)	Los Guerreros (Eddie Guerrero & Chavo Guerrero)
2004	America's Most Wanted (James Storm & Chris Harris)	La Résistance (Sylvain Grenier & Robert Conway)	The Dudley Boyz (Bubba Ray Dudley & D-Von Dudley)	Charlie Haas & Rico
2005	MNM (Joey Mercury & Johnny Nitro)	The Naturals (Andy Douglas & Chase Stevens)	Road Warrior Animal & Heidenreich	America's Most Wanted (James Storm & Chris Harris)
2006	A.J. Styles & Christopher Daniels	Paul London & Brian Kendrick	D-Generation X (Triple H & Shawn Michaels)	Big Show & Kane
2007	Paul London & Brian Kendrick	Team 3D (Brother Ray & Brother Devon)	The Briscoe Brothers (Jay Briscoe & Mark Briscoe)	Deuce 'n Domino
2008	Beer Money, Inc. (James Storm & Robert Roode)	John Morrison & The Miz	Cody Rhodes & Ted DiBiase	The Latin American Xchange (Homicide & Hernandez)
2009	Team 3D (2) (Note: Team 3D previously won the award as the Dudley Boyz.) (Brother Ray & Brother Devon)	Beer Money, Inc. (James Storm & Robert Roode)	Chris Jericho & Big Show	D-Generation X (Triple H & Shawn Michaels)
2010	The Motor City Machine Guns (Chris Sabin & Alex Shelley)	The Hart Dynasty (Tyson Kidd & David Hart Smith)	The Kings of Wrestling (Chris Hero & Claudio Castagnoli)	Beer Money, Inc. (James Storm & Robert Roode)
2011	Beer Money, Inc. (2) (James Storm & Robert Roode)	Wrestling's Greatest Tag Team (Charlie Haas & Shelton Benjamin)	Air Boom (Evan Bourne & Kofi Kingston)	Kings of Wrestling (Chris Hero & Claudio Castagnoli)
2012	Kofi Kingston & R-Truth	Bad Influence (Christopher Daniels & Frankie Kazarian)	Team Hell No (Daniel Bryan & Kane)	Samoa Joe & Magnus
2013	The Shield (Seth Rollins & Roman Reigns)	Cody Rhodes & Goldust	Team Hell No (Daniel Bryan & Kane)	reDRagon (Bobby Fish & Kyle O'Reilly)
2014	The Usos (Jey Uso & Jimmy Uso)	reDRagon (Bobby Fish & Kyle O'Reilly)	The Wolves (Davey Richards & Eddie Edwards)	Gold and Stardust (Goldust & Stardust)
2015	The New Day (Kofi Kingston, Big E & Xavier Woods)	The Young Bucks (Matt Jackson & Nick Jackson)	The Wolves (Davey Richards & Eddie Edwards)	reDRagon (Bobby Fish & Kyle O'Reilly)
2016	The New Day (2) (Kofi Kingston, Big E & Xavier Woods)	The Young Bucks (Matt Jackson & Nick Jackson)	Enzo and Cass (Enzo Amore & Big Cass)	The Revival (Scott Dawson & Dash Wilder)
2017	The Young Bucks (Matt Jackson & Nick Jackson)	The Bar (Cesaro & Sheamus)	The Shield (Seth Rollins & Dean Ambrose)	The Usos (Jey Uso & Jimmy Uso)
2018	The Young Bucks (2) (Matt Jackson & Nick Jackson)	The New Day (Kofi Kingston, Big E & Xavier Woods)	The Undisputed Era (Kyle O'Reilly & Roderick Strong)	LAX (Santana & Ortiz)
2019	The Undisputed Era (Bobby Fish & Kyle O'Reilly)	The Young Bucks (Matt Jackson & Nick Jackson)	The Lucha Bros. (Pentagon, Jr. & Rey Fenix)	The New Day (Big E, Kofi Kingston and Xavier Woods)
2020	Golden Role Models (Bayley & Sasha Banks)	FTR (Dax Harwood & Cash Wheeler)	Kenny Omega & Adam Page	The Street Profits (Montez Ford & Angelo Dawkins)
2021	The Young Bucks (3) (Matt Jackson & Nick Jackson)	Lucha Brothers (Penta El Zero Miedo & Rey Fénix)	The Usos (Jimmy Uso & Jey Uso)	The New Day (Kofi Kingston & King Woods)
2022	FTR (Dax Harwood & Cash Wheeler)	The Usos (Jimmy Uso & Jey Uso)	The Acclaimed (Anthony Bowens & Max Caster)	The Motor City Machine Guns (Chris Sabin & Alex Shelley)
2023	FTR (2) (Dax Harwood & Cash Wheeler)	Kevin Owens & Sami Zayn	Better Than You Bay Bay (Adam Cole & MJF)	The Usos (Jimmy Uso & Jey Uso)
2024	Bianca Belair & Jade Cargill	The Young Bucks (Matt Jackson & Nick Jackson)	Axiom & Nathan Frazer	The Judgment Day (Finn Bálor & JD McDonagh)
2025	The Hardys (2) (Note: The Hardys previously won the award as the Hardy Boyz.) (Matt Hardy & Jeff Hardy)	Brodido (Bandido & Brody King)	Alexa Bliss & Charlotte Flair	The Hurt Syndicate (Bobby Lashley & Shelton Benjamin)

=== Faction of the Year ===
The PWI Faction of the Year award recognized the best faction of the year. This award made its debut in 2021.

Year	Winner	Runner-up	Second runner-up	Third runner-up
2021	The Inner Circle	The Elite	The Bloodline	Bullet Club
2022	The Bloodline	Blackpool Combat Club	Jericho Appreciation Society	Bullet Club
2023	The Judgment Day	Blackpool Combat Club	The Bloodline	Bullet Club Gold
2024	The Bloodline (2)	The Wyatt Sicks	The Judgment Day	Death Riders
2025	Don Callis Family	Death Riders	The Judgment Day	The Vision

=== Match of the Year ===
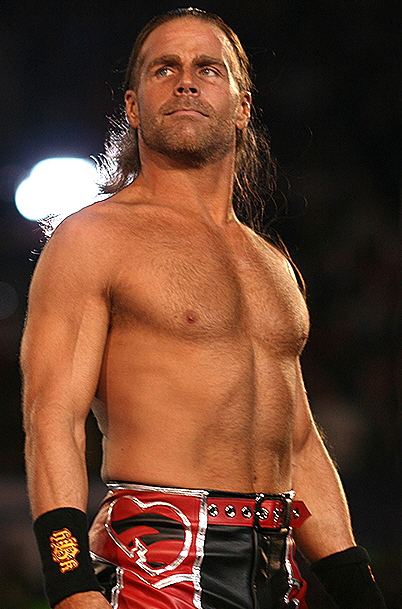
Shawn Michaels is an eleven-time winner of the category

The PWI Match of the Year award recognizes the best match of the year. Shawn Michaels has won the award a record eleven times; he had a four-year win streak from 1993 to 1996 and then a seven-year win streak from 2004 to 2010.

Year	Date	Match	Event	Location	Notes
1972	January 14	Bruno Sammartino wins battle royal	Battle Royal in Los Angeles	Los Angeles, CA	Battle Royal
1973	May 24	Dory Funk Jr. vs. Harley Race		Kansas City, MO	For the NWA World Heavyweight Championship
1974	April 19	Jack Brisco vs. Dory Funk Jr.		St. Louis, MO	For the NWA World Heavyweight Championship
1975	March 17	Bruno Sammartino vs. Spiros Arion		New York, NY	For the WWWF Heavyweight Championship
1976	June 25	Bruno Sammartino vs. Stan Hansen	Showdown at Shea	Flushing, NY	For the WWWF Heavyweight Championship
1977	April 30	Bruno Sammartino vs. "Superstar" Billy Graham		Baltimore, MD	For the WWWF Heavyweight Championship
1978	February 20	"Superstar" Billy Graham vs. Bob Backlund		New York, NY	For the WWWF Heavyweight Championship
1979	August 21	Harley Race vs. Dusty Rhodes		Tampa, FL	For the NWA World Heavyweight Championship
1980	August 9	Bruno Sammartino vs. Larry Zbyszko	Showdown at Shea	Flushing, NY	Steel Cage Match
1981	August 24	André the Giant vs. Killer Khan		New York, NY	Texas Death Match
1982	June 28	Bob Backlund vs. Jimmy Snuka		New York, NY	Steel Cage Match for the WWF Heavyweight Championship
1983	June 10	Ric Flair vs. Harley Race		St. Louis, MO	For the NWA World Heavyweight Championship
1984	May 6	Ric Flair vs. Kerry Von Erich	1st Von Erich Memorial Parade of Champions	Irving, TX	For the NWA World Heavyweight Championship
1985	March 31	Hulk Hogan & Mr. T vs. Roddy Piper & Paul Orndorff	WrestleMania	New York, NY	
1986	July 26	Ric Flair vs. Dusty Rhodes	The Great American Bash	Greensboro, NC	Steel Cage Match for the NWA World Heavyweight Championship
1987	March 29	Randy Savage vs. Ricky Steamboat	WrestleMania III	Pontiac, MI	For the WWF Intercontinental Heavyweight Championship
1988	February 5	Hulk Hogan vs. André the Giant	The Main Event I	Indianapolis, IN	For the WWF World Heavyweight Championship
1989	May 7	Ricky Steamboat vs. Ric Flair	WrestleWar	Nashville, TN	For the NWA World Heavyweight Championship
1990	April 1	Hulk Hogan vs. Ultimate Warrior	WrestleMania VI	Toronto, Ontario	For the WWF Championship and WWF Intercontinental Heavyweight Championship
1991	May 19	The Steiner Brothers (Rick Steiner & Scott Steiner) vs. Sting & Lex Luger	SuperBrawl	St. Petersburg, FL	For the WCW World Tag Team Championship
1992	August 29	Bret Hart vs. Davey Boy Smith	SummerSlam	London, England	For the WWF Intercontinental Championship
1993	July 19	Shawn Michaels vs. Marty Jannetty	Raw	New York, NY	For the WWF Intercontinental Championship
1994	March 20	Razor Ramon vs. Shawn Michaels	WrestleMania X	New York, NY	Ladder match for the WWF Intercontinental Championship
1995	April 2	Diesel vs. Shawn Michaels	WrestleMania XI	Hartford, CT	For the WWF Championship
1996	March 31	Bret Hart vs. Shawn Michaels	WrestleMania XII	Anaheim, CA	60-minute Ironman Match for the WWF Championship
1997	March 23	Bret Hart vs. Stone Cold Steve Austin	WrestleMania 13	Rosemont, IL	No Disqualification Submission Match with Ken Shamrock as the special guest referee
1998	June 28	The Undertaker vs. Mankind	King of the Ring	Pittsburgh, PA	Hell in a Cell match
1999	January 24	The Rock vs. Mankind	Royal Rumble	Anaheim, CA	"I Quit" Match for the WWF Championship
2000	April 2	The Dudley Boyz vs. The Hardy Boyz vs. Edge and Christian	WrestleMania 2000	Anaheim, CA	Triangle Ladder Match for the WWF Tag Team Championship
2001	April 1	The Dudley Boyz vs. The Hardy Boyz vs. Edge and Christian	WrestleMania X-Seven	Houston, TX	TLC Match for the WWF Tag Team Championship
2002	March 17	The Rock vs. Hollywood Hulk Hogan	WrestleMania X8	Toronto, Ontario	
2003	September 16	Kurt Angle vs. Brock Lesnar	SmackDown!	Raleigh, NC	60-minute Ironman Match for the WWE Championship
2004	March 14	Triple H vs. Chris Benoit vs. Shawn Michaels	WrestleMania XX	New York, NY	Triple Threat Match for the World Heavyweight Championship
2005	April 3	Shawn Michaels vs. Kurt Angle	WrestleMania 21	Los Angeles, CA	
2006	April 2	Shawn Michaels vs. Vince McMahon	WrestleMania 22	Rosemont, IL	No Holds Barred Match
2007	April 23	John Cena vs. Shawn Michaels	Raw	London, England	
2008	March 30	Shawn Michaels vs. Ric Flair	WrestleMania XXIV	Orlando, FL	Career Threatening Match
2009	April 5	The Undertaker vs. Shawn Michaels	WrestleMania 25	Houston, TX	
2010	March 28	The Undertaker vs. Shawn Michaels	WrestleMania XXVI	Phoenix, AZ	Streak vs. Career Match
2011	July 17	John Cena vs. CM Punk	Money in the Bank	Rosemont, IL	For the WWE Championship
2012	April 1	The Undertaker vs. Triple H	WrestleMania XXVIII	Miami Gardens, FL	Hell in a Cell Match with Shawn Michaels as the special guest referee
2013	August 18	John Cena vs. Daniel Bryan	SummerSlam	Los Angeles, CA	For the WWE Championship with Triple H as the special guest referee
2014	June 1	John Cena vs. Bray Wyatt	Payback	Rosemont, IL	Last Man Standing Match
2015	October 7	Bayley vs. Sasha Banks	NXT TakeOver: Respect	Winter Park, FL	30-minute Ironwoman Match for the NXT Women's Championship
2016	August 21	John Cena vs. A.J. Styles	SummerSlam	Brooklyn, NY	
2017	January 4	Kazuchika Okada vs. Kenny Omega	Wrestle Kingdom 11	Tokyo, Japan	For the IWGP Heavyweight Championship
2018	June 9	Kazuchika Okada vs. Kenny Omega	Dominion 6.9 in Osaka-jo Hall	Osaka, Japan	No Time Limit Two Out of Three Falls Match for the IWGP Heavyweight Championship
2019	May 25	Cody Rhodes vs. Dustin Rhodes	Double or Nothing	Paradise, NV	
2020	February 29	Kenny Omega & "Hangman" Adam Page vs. The Young Bucks (Matt Jackson & Nick Jackson)	Revolution	Chicago, IL	For the AEW World Tag Team Championship
2021	March 17	Thunder Rosa vs. Britt Baker	St. Patrick's Day Slam	Jacksonville, FL	Unsanctioned Lights Out Match
2022	June 5	Cody Rhodes vs. Seth "Freakin" Rollins	Hell in a Cell	Rosemont, IL	Hell in a Cell Match
2023	April 1	Charlotte Flair vs. Rhea Ripley	WrestleMania 39	Inglewood, CA	For the WWE SmackDown Women's Championship
2024	April 7	Cody Rhodes vs. Roman Reigns	WrestleMania XL	Philadelphia, PA	Bloodline Rules Match for the Undisputed WWE Universal Championship
2025	August 3	John Cena vs. Cody Rhodes	SummerSlam	East Rutherford, NJ	Street Fight for the Undisputed WWE Championship

=== Feud of the Year ===
The PWI Feud of the Year award recognizes the best rivalry of the year, normally between two wrestlers but also between groups as well. Ric Flair vs. Lex Luger is tied with Stone Cold Steve Austin vs. Vince McMahon, each winning twice. Ric Flair, Vince McMahon, Triple H and CM Punk have won this award four times individually. The Four Horsemen, The Authority, The Nexus, and Aces & Eights are the only stables to win the award.

Year	Winner	Runner-up	Second runner-up	Third runner-up
1986	Hulk Hogan vs. Paul Orndorff	Ric Flair vs. Dusty Rhodes	The Sheepherders (Luke Williams & Butch Miller) vs. The Fantastics (Bobby Fulton & Tommy Rogers)	The Midnight Express (Dennis Condrey & Bobby Eaton) vs. The Rock 'n' Roll Express (Ricky Morton & Robert Gibson)
1987	The Four Horsemen (Ric Flair, Arn Anderson, Tully Blanchard & Lex Luger) vs. The Super Powers (Dusty Rhodes & Nikita Koloff) & The Road Warriors (Hawk & Animal)	Randy Savage vs. Ricky Steamboat	Jerry Lawler vs. Tommy Rich & Austin Idol	Brian Adias vs. Kevin Von Erich
1988	Ric Flair vs. Lex Luger	Rick Rude vs. Jake Roberts	Kerry Von Erich vs. Jerry Lawler	The Mega Powers (Hulk Hogan & Randy Savage) vs. The Mega Bucks (Ted DiBiase & André the Giant)
1989	Ric Flair vs. Terry Funk	Hulk Hogan vs. Randy Savage	Skandor Akbar's Devastation Inc. vs. Eric Embry	Roddy Piper vs. Rick Rude
1990	Ric Flair vs. Lex Luger	Hulk Hogan vs. Earthquake	Ultimate Warrior vs. Rick Rude	Chris Adams vs. Steve Austin
1991	Ultimate Warrior vs. The Undertaker	Hulk Hogan vs. Sgt. Slaughter	Sting vs. Cactus Jack & Abdullah the Butcher	Lex Luger vs. Ron Simmons
1992	The Moondogs (Spot, Spike & Cujo) vs. Jerry Lawler & Jeff Jarrett	Ric Flair vs. Randy Savage	Ultimate Warrior vs. Papa Shango	Rick Rude vs. Ricky Steamboat
1993	Bret Hart vs. Jerry Lawler	Rick Rude vs. Dustin Rhodes	Cactus Jack vs. Vader	Tony Anthony vs. Tracy Smothers
1994	Bret Hart vs. Owen Hart	Ric Flair vs. Hulk Hogan	Randy Savage vs. Crush	Sabu vs. Terry Funk
1995	Axl Rotten vs. Ian Rotten	Harlem Heat (Stevie Ray & Booker T) vs. The Nasty Boys (Brian Knobs & Jerry Sags)	Jeff Jarrett vs. Razor Ramon	Ric Flair vs. Randy Savage
1996	Eric Bischoff vs. Vince McMahon	Ric Flair vs. Randy Savage	The Undertaker vs. Mankind	Jamie Dundee vs. Wolfie D
1997	Diamond Dallas Page vs. Randy Savage	Stone Cold Steve Austin vs. Bret Hart	Hollywood Hogan vs. Roddy Piper	Sabu vs. Taz
1998	Stone Cold Steve Austin vs. Vince McMahon	nWo Wolfpac vs. nWo Hollywood	Ric Flair vs. Eric Bischoff	The Rock vs. Ken Shamrock
1999	Stone Cold Steve Austin vs. Vince McMahon	Triple H vs. The Rock	Jerry Lynn vs. Rob Van Dam	Ric Flair vs. Hollywood Hogan
2000	Triple H vs. Kurt Angle	Triple H vs. The Rock	Booker T vs. Jeff Jarrett	Edge & Christian vs. The Hardy Boyz (Matt Hardy & Jeff Hardy)
2001	Shane McMahon vs. Vince McMahon	Booker T vs. The Rock	Chris Benoit vs. Kurt Angle	Edge vs. Christian
2002	Eric Bischoff vs. Stephanie McMahon	Kurt Angle vs. Edge	Triple H vs. Stephanie McMahon	Trish Stratus vs. Molly Holly
2003	Kurt Angle vs. Brock Lesnar	Hulk Hogan vs. Vince McMahon	Stone Cold Steve Austin vs. Eric Bischoff	Jeff Jarrett vs. Raven
2004	Triple H vs. Chris Benoit	Randy Orton vs. Mick Foley	Christian & Trish Stratus vs. Chris Jericho	Matt Hardy vs. Kane
2005	Matt Hardy vs. Edge & Lita	A.J. Styles vs. Christopher Daniels	Rey Mysterio vs. Eddie Guerrero	Batista vs. Triple H
2006	John Cena vs. Edge	D-Generation X (Triple H & Shawn Michaels) vs. The McMahons (Vince McMahon & Shane McMahon)	Sting vs. Jeff Jarrett	Trish Stratus vs. Mickie James
2007	Kurt Angle vs. Samoa Joe	Batista vs. The Undertaker	John Cena vs. Shawn Michaels	John Cena vs. Randy Orton
2008	Shawn Michaels vs. Chris Jericho	Kurt Angle vs. A.J. Styles	The Undertaker vs. Edge	Beer Money, Inc. (James Storm & Robert Roode) vs. The Latin American Xchange (Homicide & Hernandez)
2009	Triple H vs. Randy Orton	CM Punk vs. Jeff Hardy	Main Event Mafia vs. TNA Frontline	Kurt Angle vs. Jeff Jarrett
2010	The Nexus (Note: The Nexus consisted of Wade Barrett, Darren Young, Skip Sheffield, Michael Tarver, Justin Gabriel, Heath Slater, David Otunga, Husky Harris and Michael McGillicutty.) vs. WWE	Bret Hart vs. Vince McMahon	Kurt Angle vs. Mr. Anderson	John Cena vs. Batista
2011	John Cena vs. CM Punk	Christian vs. Randy Orton	Kurt Angle vs. Jeff Jarrett	The Briscoe Brothers (Jay Briscoe & Mark Briscoe) vs. All Night Express (Rhett Titus & Kenny King)
2012	Aces & Eights vs. TNA	The Rock vs. John Cena	CM Punk vs. Daniel Bryan	Adam Pearce vs. Colt Cabana
2013	Daniel Bryan vs. The Authority (Note: The Authority consisted of Triple H, Stephanie McMahon and Kane.)	CM Punk vs. Paul Heyman	Daniel Bryan vs. Randy Orton	The Rock vs. John Cena
2014	Dean Ambrose vs. Seth Rollins	The Wyatt Family (Bray Wyatt, Luke Harper & Erick Rowan) vs. The Shield (Seth Rollins, Dean Ambrose & Roman Reigns)	John Cena vs. Brock Lesnar	Bully Ray vs. Dixie Carter
2015	Brock Lesnar vs. The Undertaker	John Cena vs. Kevin Owens	Seth Rollins vs. John Cena	Kazuchika Okada vs. Hiroshi Tanahashi
2016	Sasha Banks vs. Charlotte Flair	John Cena vs. A.J. Styles	Sami Zayn vs. Kevin Owens	A.J. Styles vs. Dean Ambrose
2017	Kazuchika Okada vs. Kenny Omega	Braun Strowman vs. Roman Reigns	Chris Jericho vs. Kevin Owens	Braun Strowman vs. Brock Lesnar
2018	Johnny Gargano vs. Tommaso Ciampa	AJ Styles vs. Samoa Joe	Daniel Bryan vs. The Miz	Brock Lesnar vs. Roman Reigns
2019	Adam Cole vs. Johnny Gargano	Jon Moxley vs. Kenny Omega	Becky Lynch vs. Charlotte Flair	Ronda Rousey vs. Becky Lynch
2020	Sasha Banks vs. Bayley	Edge vs. Randy Orton	Chris Jericho vs. Orange Cassidy	MJF vs. Cody Rhodes
2021	Chris Jericho vs. MJF	Bianca Belair vs. Sasha Banks	Thunder Rosa vs. Britt Baker	Edge vs. Roman Reigns
2022	CM Punk vs. MJF	Blackpool Combat Club vs. Jericho Appreciation Society	Roman Reigns vs. Brock Lesnar	Becky Lynch vs. Bianca Belair
2023	Sami Zayn vs. The Bloodline	CM Punk vs. AEW	Cody Rhodes vs. Brock Lesnar	Becky Lynch vs. Trish Stratus
2024	CM Punk vs. Drew McIntyre	Adam Page vs. Swerve Strickland	Liv Morgan vs. Rhea Ripley	Toni Storm vs. Mariah May
2025	CM Punk vs. Seth Rollins	Toni Storm vs. Mariah May	Adam Page vs. Jon Moxley	NXT vs. TNA

=== Most Popular Wrestler of the Year ===
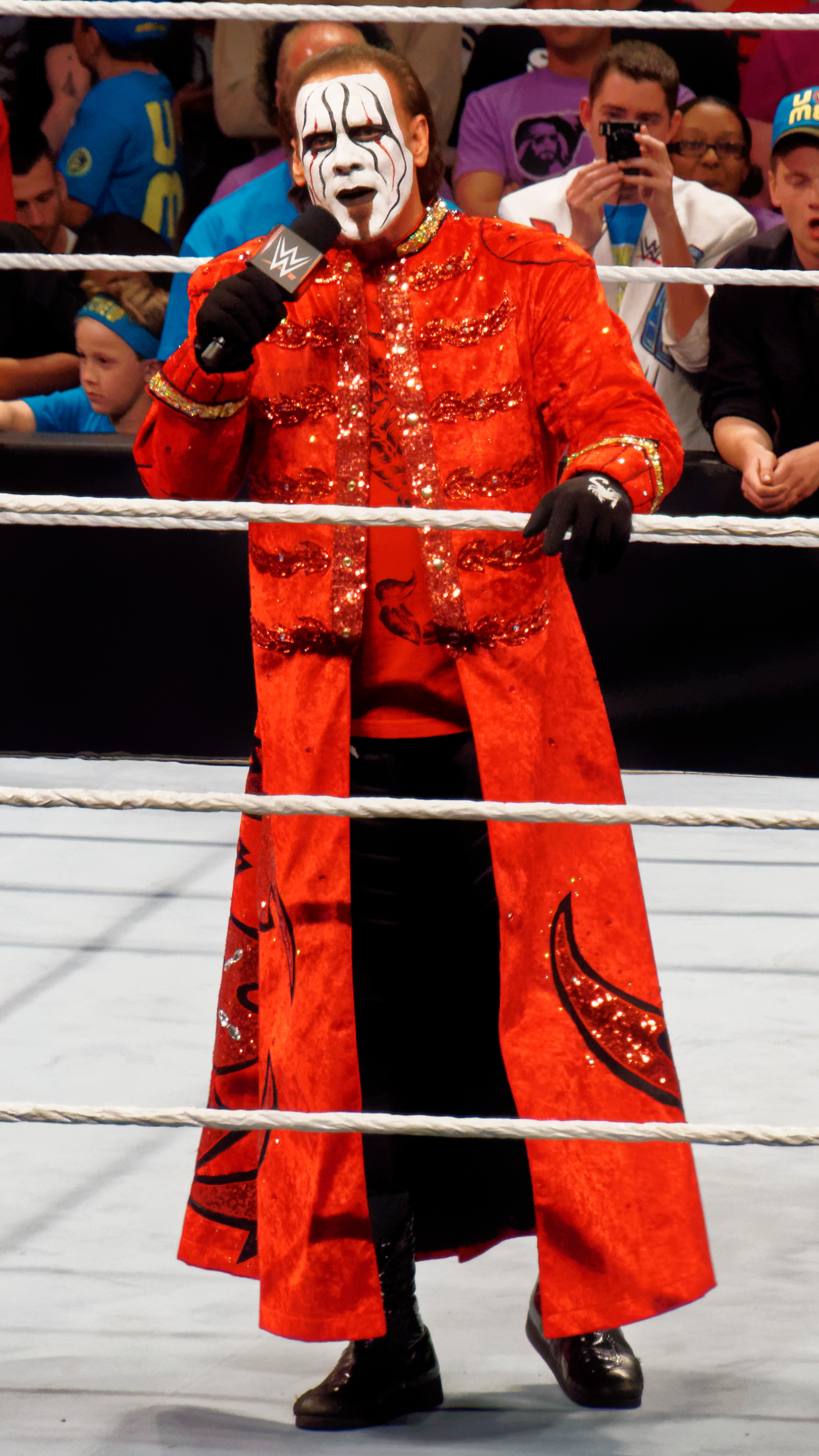
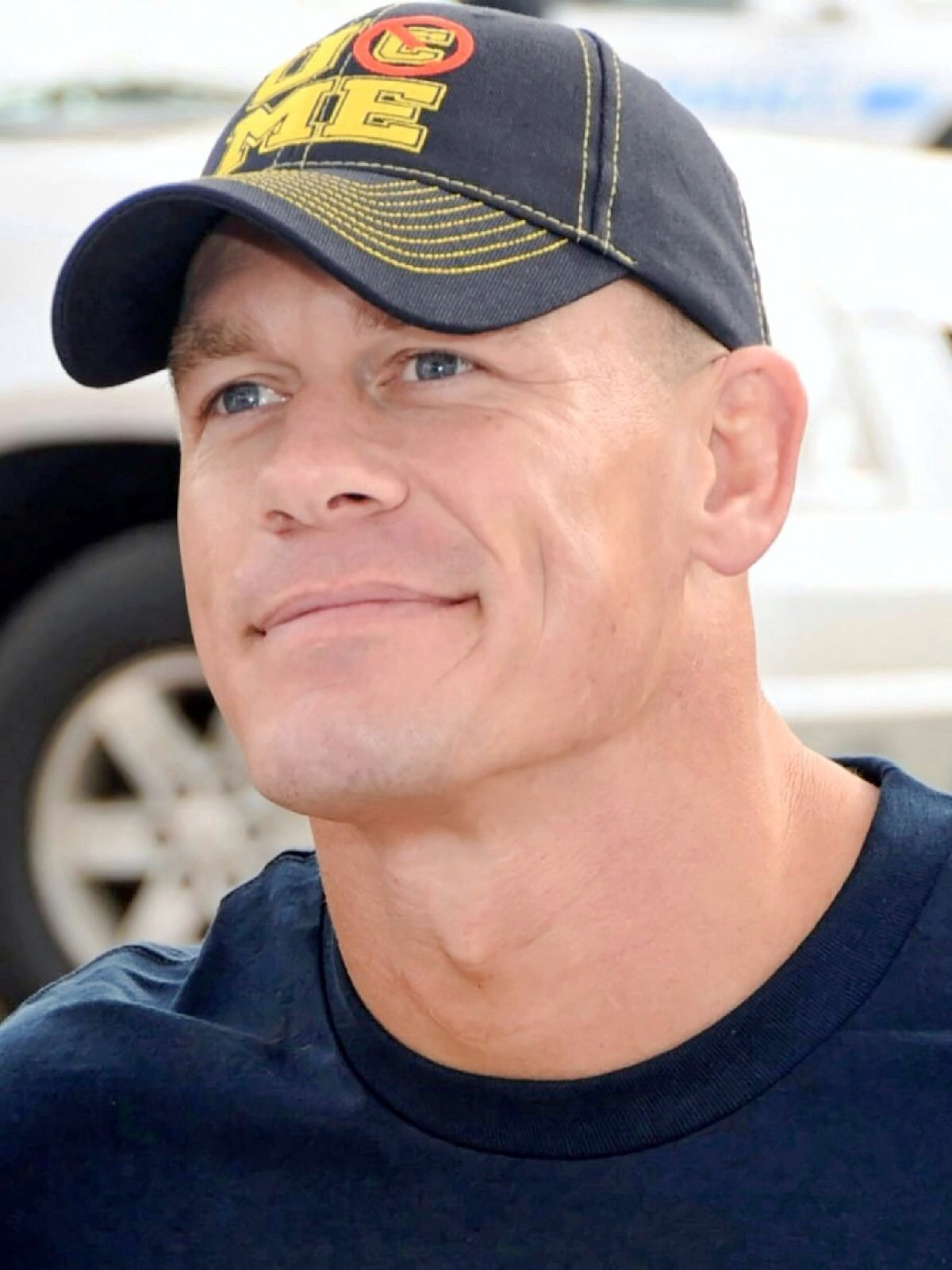
Sting (left) and John Cena (right) are four-time winners of the category

The PWI Most Popular Wrestler of the Year award recognizes the best face or heroic professional wrestler of the year. Sting and John Cena have won this award a record four times. Rob Van Dam is the only wrestler to win the award as a heel (villain). In 2019, Becky Lynch became the first woman to win the award.

Year	Winner	Runner-up	Second runner-up	Third runner-up
1972	Jack Brisco / Fred Curry	—N/a	—N/a	—N/a
1973	Chief Jay Strongbow	—N/a	—N/a	—N/a
1974	Billy Robinson	—N/a	—N/a	—N/a
1975	Mil Máscaras	—N/a	—N/a	—N/a
1976	Wahoo McDaniel	Chief Jay Strongbow	Mr. Wrestling II	Ivan Putski
1977	André the Giant	Dusty Rhodes	Bob Backlund	Mil Máscaras
1978	Dusty Rhodes	André the Giant	Ricky Steamboat	Bob Backlund
1979	Dusty Rhodes (2)	André the Giant	Ivan Putski	Mr. Wrestling II
1980	Mr. Wrestling II	Dusty Rhodes	André the Giant	Bruno Sammartino
1981	Tommy Rich	Bob Backlund	André the Giant	Dusty Rhodes
1982	André the Giant (2)	Tommy Rich	Hulk Hogan	Dusty Rhodes
1983	Jimmy Snuka	Dusty Rhodes	David Von Erich	Junkyard Dog
1984	Kerry Von Erich	Hulk Hogan	Dusty Rhodes	Sgt. Slaughter
1985	Hulk Hogan	Magnum T. A.	Kerry Von Erich	Tito Santana
1986	Roddy Piper	Hulk Hogan	Ricky Morton	Nikita Koloff
1987	Dusty Rhodes (3)	Hulk Hogan	Randy Savage	Nikita Koloff
1988	Randy Savage	Hulk Hogan	Sting	Lex Luger
1989	Hulk Hogan (2)	Ric Flair	Sting	Ultimate Warrior
1990	Hulk Hogan (3)	Sting	Ultimate Warrior	Lex Luger
1991	Sting	Hulk Hogan	Sid Justice	The Steiner Brothers (Rick & Scott Steiner)
1992	Sting (2)	Ultimate Warrior	The Undertaker	Ron Simmons
1993	Lex Luger	Sting	Bret Hart	Dustin Rhodes
1994	Sting (3)	Bret Hart	The Undertaker	Hulk Hogan
1995	Shawn Michaels	Sting	Diesel	Hulk Hogan
1996	Shawn Michaels (2)	Randy Savage	Sycho Sid	The Undertaker
1997	Sting (4)	Stone Cold Steve Austin	Ric Flair	Diamond Dallas Page
1998	Stone Cold Steve Austin	Goldberg	The Rock	Diamond Dallas Page
1999	The Rock	Stone Cold Steve Austin	Goldberg	Mankind
2000	The Rock (2)	Rob Van Dam	Chris Jericho	Goldberg
2001	Rob Van Dam	The Rock	Chris Jericho	Kurt Angle
2002	Rob Van Dam (2)	Hollywood Hulk Hogan	Booker T	The Rock
2003	Kurt Angle	Stone Cold Steve Austin	Rob Van Dam	Rey Mysterio
2004	John Cena	Chris Benoit	Eddie Guerrero	Eugene
2005	John Cena (2)	Batista	A.J. Styles	Rey Mysterio
2006	Samoa Joe	John Cena	Rey Mysterio	Sting
2007	John Cena (3)	The Undertaker	Sting	CM Punk
2008	Jeff Hardy	Shawn Michaels	Samoa Joe	The Undertaker
2009	Jeff Hardy (2)	John Cena	Sting	The Undertaker
2010	Randy Orton	John Cena	Rob Van Dam	Daniel Bryan
2011	CM Punk	John Cena	Sting	Randy Orton
2012	John Cena (4)	Sheamus	Randy Orton	Jeff Hardy
2013	Daniel Bryan	John Cena	CM Punk	Dolph Ziggler
2014	Dean Ambrose	Daniel Bryan	John Cena	The Usos (Jey Uso & Jimmy Uso)
2015	Dean Ambrose (2)	Brock Lesnar	Finn Bálor	Shinsuke Nakamura
2016	Shinsuke Nakamura	Dean Ambrose	Bayley	Enzo and Cass (Enzo Amore & Big Cass)
2017	A.J. Styles	Shinsuke Nakamura	Braun Strowman	Kazuchika Okada
2018	A.J. Styles (2)	Seth Rollins	Becky Lynch	Ronda Rousey
2019	Becky Lynch	Jon Moxley	Kofi Kingston	Johnny Gargano
2020	Orange Cassidy	Jon Moxley	Drew McIntyre	Keith Lee
2021	CM Punk (2)	Adam Page	Big E	Bianca Belair
2022	Jon Moxley (3)	Roman Reigns	CM Punk	Bianca Belair
2023	Cody Rhodes	LA Knight	MJF	Sami Zayn
2024	Cody Rhodes (2)	Jey Uso	Joe Hendry	Rhea Ripley
2025	Toni Storm	Cody Rhodes	John Cena	Jey Uso

=== Most Hated Wrestler of the Year ===
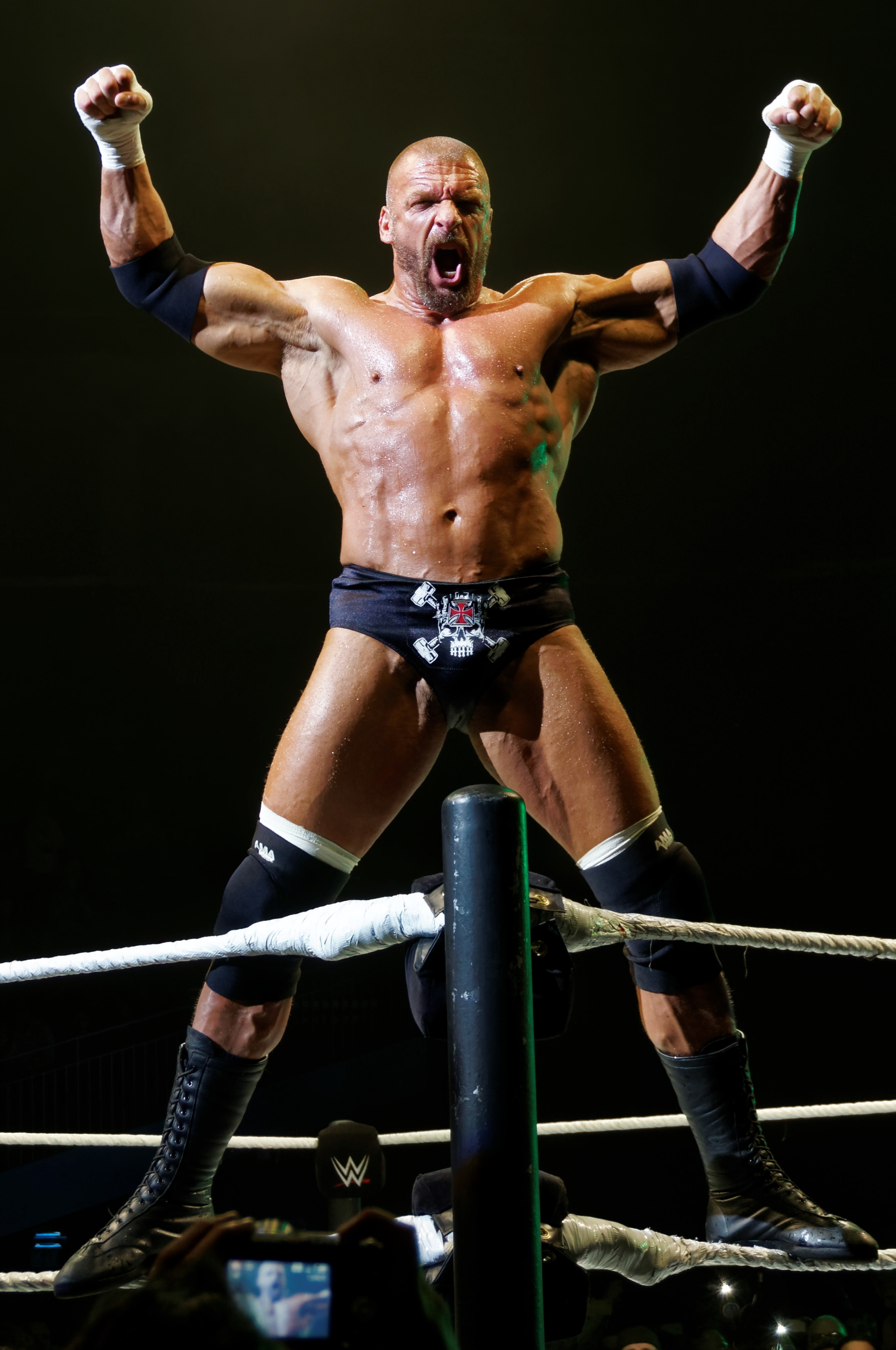
Triple H is a five-time winner of the category

The PWI Most Hated Wrestler of the Year award typically recognizes the most effective heel (villainous) professional wrestler of the year. Triple H has won this award a record five times, with his fourth win as part of The Authority. In 2010, the award was given to a stable, The Nexus for the first time. Roman Reigns is the only wrestler to win this award while presented as a face (heroic character).

Year	Winner	Runner-up	Third place	Fourth place
1972	The Sheik	—N/a	—N/a	—N/a
1973	"Superstar" Billy Graham	—N/a	—N/a	—N/a
1974	The Great Mephisto	—N/a	—N/a	—N/a
1975	Greg Valentine	—N/a	—N/a	—N/a
1976	Stan Hansen	Ox Baker	Terry Funk	The Spoiler
1977	Ken Patera	Ric Flair	Superstar Billy Graham	Nick Bockwinkel
1978	Ric Flair	Ken Patera	Victor Rivera	Bob Orton Jr.
1979	Greg Valentine (2)	Terry Funk	Ken Patera	Ivan Koloff
1980	Larry Zbyszko	Greg Valentine	Ernie Ladd	Hulk Hogan
1981	Ken Patera (2)	Don Muraco	Nick Bockwinkel	Roddy Piper
1982	Ted DiBiase	Blackjack Mulligan	Superstar Billy Graham	Buzz Sawyer
1983	Greg Valentine (3)	Masked Superstar	Kevin Sullivan	Michael Hayes
1984	Roddy Piper	Kevin Sullivan	Tully Blanchard	The Iron Sheik
1985	Roddy Piper (2)	Chris Adams	Ted DiBiase	Big John Studd
1986	Paul Orndorff	Ric Flair	Colonel DeBeers	Rick Rude
1987	Ric Flair (2)	André the Giant	The Honky Tonk Man	Lex Luger
1988	André the Giant	Barry Windham	Eddie Gilbert	Ted DiBiase
1989	Randy Savage	Terry Funk	Rick Rude	Lex Luger
1990	Earthquake	Ric Flair	Rick Rude	Eddie Gilbert
1991	Sgt. Slaughter	The Undertaker	Lex Luger	Jake Roberts
1992	Rick Rude	Ric Flair	Jake Roberts	The Moondogs (Spot & Cujo)
1993	Jerry Lawler	Big Van Vader	Yokozuna	Shawn Michaels
1994	Bob Backlund	Owen Hart	Big Van Vader	Jerry Lawler
1995	Jerry Lawler (2)	Kevin Sullivan	The Gangstas	Davey Boy Smith
1996	Hollywood Hogan	Goldust	Jerry Lawler	The Giant
1997	Bret Hart	Hollywood Hogan	Owen Hart	Curt Hennig
1998	Hollywood Hogan (2)	Vince McMahon	Eric Bischoff	Bret Hart
1999	Diamond Dallas Page	Triple H	The Undertaker	The Dudley Boyz (Bubba Ray Dudley & D-Von Dudley)
2000	Kurt Angle	Triple H	Steven Richards	Jeff Jarrett
2001	Stone Cold Steve Austin	Booker T	Kurt Angle	Shane McMahon
2002	Chris Jericho	The Un-Americans (Christian, Lance Storm & Test)	Kurt Angle	Triple H
2003	Triple H	Kane	Vince McMahon	Test
2004	Triple H (2)	John "Bradshaw" Layfield	Kurt Angle	Jeff Jarrett
2005	Triple H (3)	Edge	Jeff Jarrett	Muhammad Hassan
2006	Edge	Jeff Jarrett	Randy Orton	King Booker
2007	Randy Orton	Kurt Angle	The Great Khali	Robert Roode
2008	Chris Jericho (2)	Edge	Randy Orton	Kurt Angle
2009	Randy Orton (2)	CM Punk	Chris Jericho	Kurt Angle
2010	The Nexus	CM Punk	The Miz	Hulk Hogan and Eric Bischoff
2011	The Miz	Alberto Del Rio	Christian	Kurt Angle
2012	CM Punk	Bobby Roode	Alberto Del Rio	Kevin Steen
2013	The Authority	Randy Orton	Bully Ray	The Shield (Seth Rollins, Dean Ambrose & Roman Reigns)
2014	Triple H (5) and Stephanie McMahon (2)	Seth Rollins	Dixie Carter	Batista
2015	Seth Rollins	Ethan Carter III	Kevin Owens	Bray Wyatt
2016	Roman Reigns	Kevin Owens	The Miz	Eva Marie
2017	Jinder Mahal	Kevin Owens	Roman Reigns	Sexy Star
2018	Brock Lesnar	Tommaso Ciampa	Samoa Joe	Baron Corbin
2019	Baron Corbin	Brock Lesnar	Shane McMahon	MJF
2020	Seth Rollins (2)	Roman Reigns	MJF	Randy Orton
2021	MJF	Roman Reigns	Kenny Omega	Baron Corbin
2022	MJF (2)	Roman Reigns	Chris Jericho	Sammy Guevara
2023	Dominik Mysterio	Christian Cage	Roman Reigns	CM Punk
2024	Dominik Mysterio (2)	Solo Sikoa	MJF	Logan Paul
2025	Logan Paul	Dominik Mysterio	Don Callis	Jon Moxley

=== Comeback of the Year ===
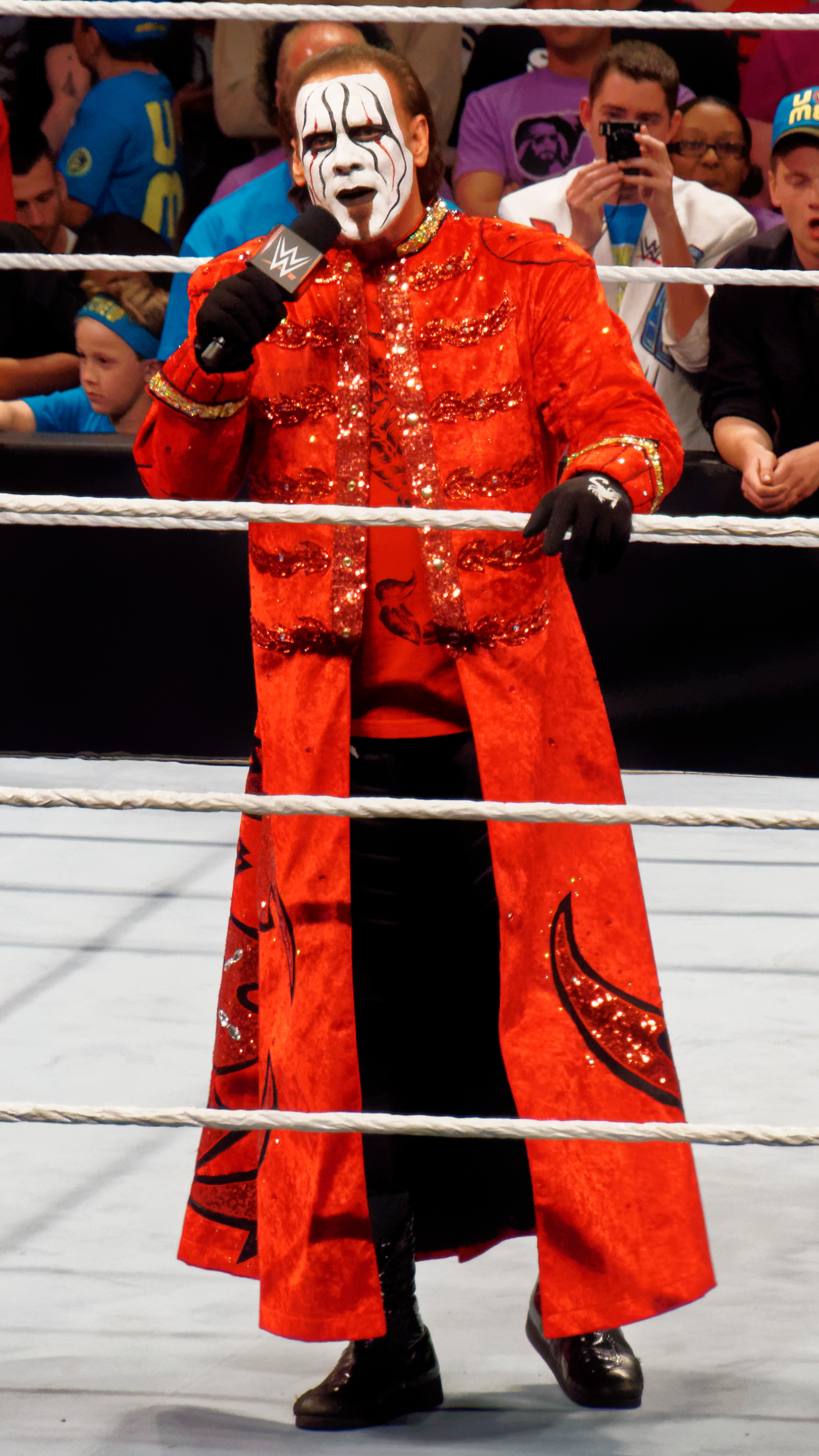
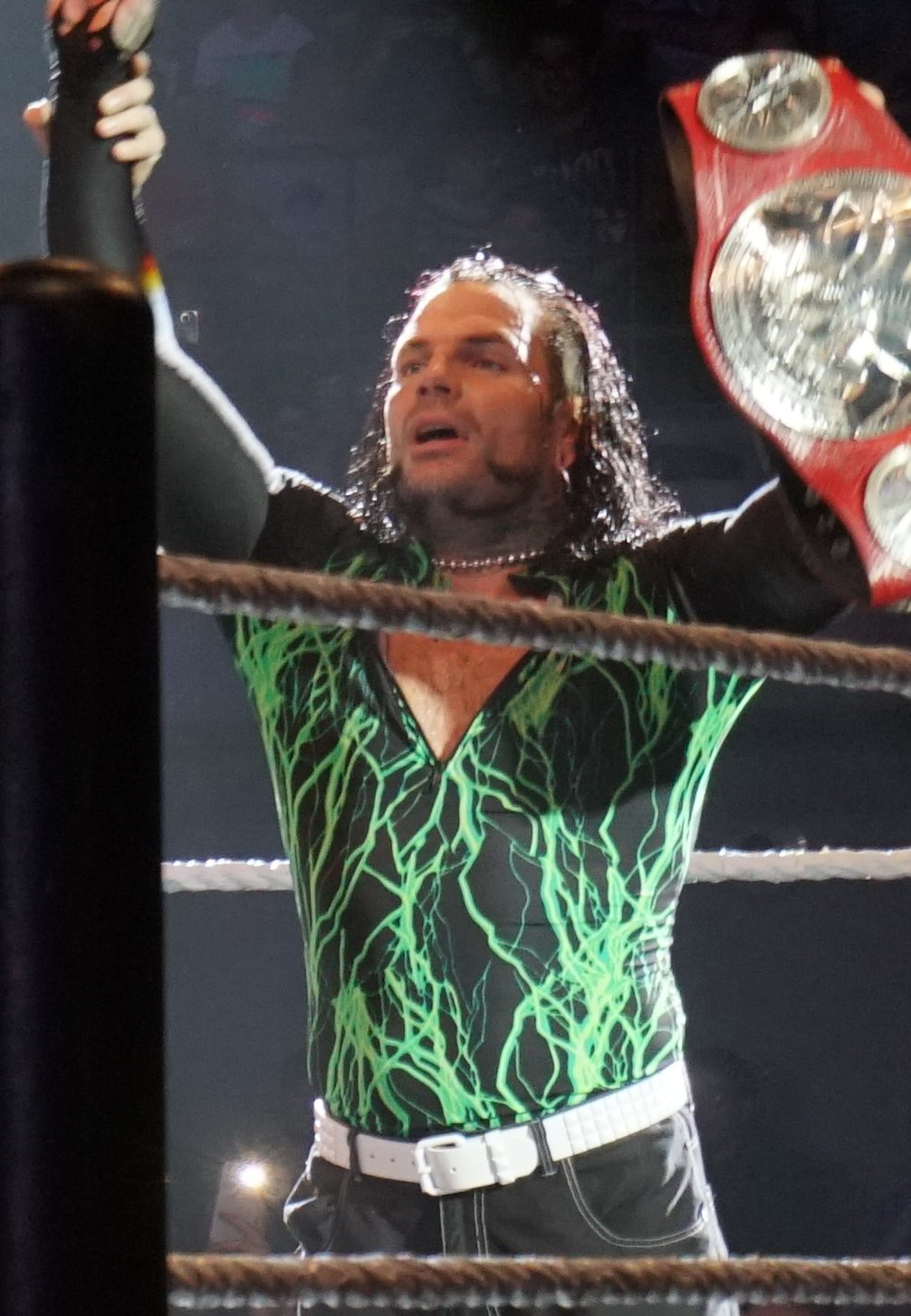
Sting (left) and Jeff Hardy (right) are three-time winners of the category

The PWI Comeback of the Year award, given yearly since 1992, recognizes the most impressive comeback by a professional wrestler during the year. Sting and Jeff Hardy have won this award a record three times each (Hardy's third win is shared with his brother Matt as part of the Hardy Boyz).

Year	Winner	Runner-up	Second runner-up	Third runner-up
1992	Ultimate Warrior	Bob Backlund	The Sheik	Junkyard Dog
1993	Lex Luger	Brutus Beefcake	Ric Flair	Paul Roma
1994	Hulk Hogan	Bob Backlund	The Undertaker	Alundra Blayze
1995	Randy Savage	The Heavenly Bodies (Tom Prichard & Jimmy Del Ray)	Savio Vega	Ultimate Warrior
1996	Sycho Sid	Jake Roberts	Faarooq	Road Warrior Animal
1997	Bret Hart	Curt Hennig	Brian Pillman	Ric Flair
1998	X-Pac	Sting	Dean Malenko	The Warrior
1999	Eddie Guerrero	Buff Bagwell	Curt Hennig	Michael Hayes
2000	Rikishi	Dusty Rhodes	The Undertaker	Vince McMahon
2001	Rob Van Dam	Stone Cold Steve Austin	Booker T	Scott Hall
2002	Hollywood Hulk Hogan (2)	Eddie Guerrero	Chris Benoit	Ron Killings
2003	Kurt Angle	Goldberg	Raven	Último Dragón
2004	Edge	Jeff Hardy	William Regal	Chavo Guerrero Sr.
2005	Road Warrior Animal	Matt Hardy	Raven	Hulk Hogan
2006	Sting	Sabu	Jeff Hardy	Finlay
2007	Jeff Hardy	Triple H	Rey Mysterio	The Steiner Brothers (Rick Steiner & Scott Steiner)
2008	Chris Jericho	Jeff Jarrett	William Regal	Sheik Abdul Bashir
2009	Jerry Lynn	Ricky Steamboat	The Undertaker	Mick Foley
2010	Rob Van Dam (2)	Kane	Edge	Jeff Hardy
2011	Sting (2)	Mark Henry	Austin Aries	Montel Vontavious Porter
2012	Jeff Hardy (2)	The Rock	Brock Lesnar	Layla
2013	Goldust	Chris Sabin	Jerry Lawler	The Bella Twins (Nikki Bella & Brie Bella)
2014	Sting (3)	Bobby Lashley	Batista	The New Age Outlaws (Road Dogg & Billy Gunn)
2015	The Undertaker	Sheamus	Roderick Strong	Daniel Bryan
2016	Goldberg	Seth Rollins	Chris Jericho	Matt Hardy
2017	The Hardy Boyz (Matt Hardy & Jeff Hardy (3))	Finn Bálor	Mickie James	Shelton Benjamin
2018	Daniel Bryan	Drew McIntyre	PCO	Shawn Michaels
2019	Roman Reigns	Bray Wyatt	Dustin Rhodes	Sasha Banks
2020	MVP	Randy Orton	Eric Young	Asuka
2021	CM Punk	Sting	Christian Cage	Becky Lynch
2022	Taya Valkyrie	Bayley	Johnny Gargano	Alexa Bliss
2023	Trinity	Saraya	Adam Cole	Trish Stratus
2024	Liv Morgan	Mercedes Moné	Randy Orton	The Rock
2025	John Cena	AJ Lee	Bandido	Kenny Omega

=== Most Improved Wrestler of the Year ===
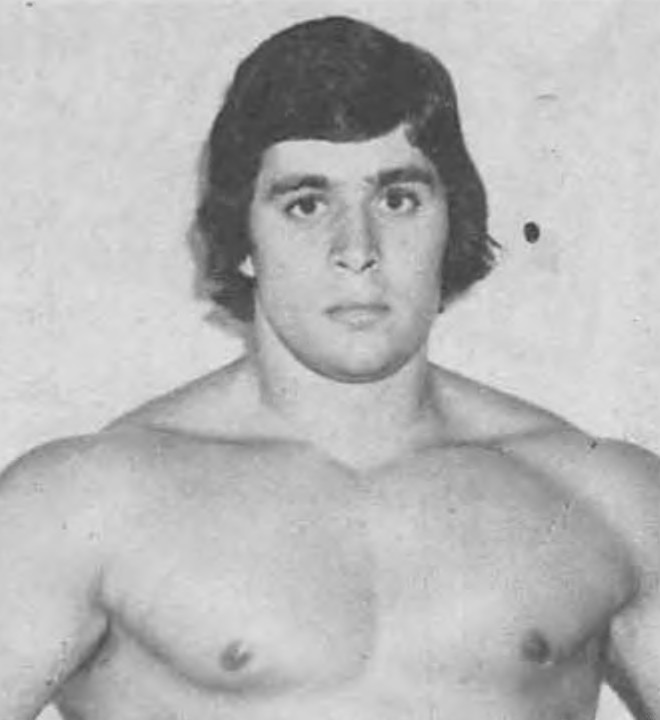
Dino Bravo was the first recipient

The PWI Most Improved Wrestler of the Year award recognizes the most improved professional wrestler of the year.

Year	Winner	Runner-up	Second runner-up	Third runner-up
1978	Dino Bravo	Bob Backlund	Ricky Steamboat	Tony Atlas
1979	Tommy Rich	Eddy Mansfield	Kevin Von Erich	Ted DiBiase
1980	Tony Atlas	Larry Zbyszko	Ted DiBiase	Kerry Von Erich
1981	Kevin Sullivan	Sgt. Slaughter	Charlie Cook	Tito Santana
1982	Barry Windham	Otto Wanz	Buzz Sawyer	Rick Martel
1983	Brett Wayne Sawyer	Mike Rotundo	Pez Whatley	Brad Rheingans
1984	Billy Jack Haynes	Magnum T. A.	Rick Martel	Ron Garvin
1985	Steve Williams	Brian Adias	Nikita Koloff	Randy Savage
1986	Terry Gordy	Scott Hall	Sam Houston	Wendell Cooley
1987	Curt Hennig	Al Perez	The Honky Tonk Man	Sting
1988	Sting	Ultimate Warrior	Iceman Parsons	Jeff Jarrett
1989	Scott Steiner	Brutus Beefcake	Jeff Jarrett	P.Y. Chu-Hi
1990	Paul Roma	Doom (Ron Simmons & Butch Reed)	Tugboat	Cactus Jack
1991	Dustin Rhodes	Ron Simmons	The Undertaker	Crush
1992	Razor Ramon	Ron Simmons	Virgil	Brian Christopher
1993	Yokozuna	The 1-2-3 Kid	Brian Lee	Tatanka
1994	Diesel	Johnny B. Badd	Sabu	Owen Hart
1995	Diamond Dallas Page	Tommy Dreamer	Harlem Heat (Booker T & Stevie Ray)	Savio Vega
1996	Ahmed Johnson	Chris Benoit	Stevie Richards	Taz
1997	Ken Shamrock	Steve McMichael	The Headbangers (Mosh & Thrasher)	Alex Wright
1998	Booker T	D'Lo Brown	The New Age Outlaws (Road Dogg & Billy Gunn)	Juventud Guerrera
1999	Jerry Lynn	The Hardy Boyz (Matt Hardy & Jeff Hardy)	Hardcore Holly	Kanyon
2000	Steve Corino	Lance Storm	Scotty 2 Hotty	Justin Credible
2001	Edge	Test	The Hurricane	Kurt Angle
2002	Brock Lesnar	Trish Stratus	Jamie Noble	A.J. Styles
2003	John Cena	Matt Hardy	Team Angle (Charlie Haas & Shelton Benjamin)	Victoria
2004	Randy Orton	Shelton Benjamin	Batista	John "Bradshaw" Layfield
2005	Batista	Carlito	Monty Brown	Chris Masters
2006	Bobby Lashley	Johnny Nitro	Chris Sabin	Umaga
2007	Candice Michelle	Jay Lethal	Montel Vontavious Porter	Cody Rhodes
2008	Cody Rhodes	The Miz	Petey Williams	Kofi Kingston
2009	John Morrison	Dolph Ziggler	Eric Young	The Miz
2010	D'Angelo Dinero	Wade Barrett	Sheamus	Jay Lethal
2011	Mark Henry	Kelly Kelly	Eddie Edwards	Zack Ryder
2012	Ryback	Brooke/Miss Tessmacher	Michael Elgin	Adam Cole
2013	Magnus	Curtis Axel	Roman Reigns	Big E Langston
2014	Rusev	Ethan Carter III	Luke Harper	Eric Young
2015	Roman Reigns	Nikki Bella	Sasha Banks	Bayley
2016	The Miz	T. J. Perkins	Kenny Omega	Dalton Castle
2017	Jinder Mahal	Braun Strowman	Eli Drake	Naomi
2018	Velveteen Dream	The B Team (Bo Dallas & Curtis Axel)	Nia Jax	Hangman Page
2019	Brian Cage	Jay White	Buddy Murphy	Shorty G
2020	Drew McIntyre	Ricky Starks	Otis	Jey Uso
2021	Britt Baker	Bobby Lashley	Trevor Murdoch	Deonna Purrazzo
2022	Mandy Rose	Madcap Moss	Julia Hart	2point0
2023	LA Knight	Julia Hart	Trick Williams	Sanada
2024	Mariah May	Nia Jax	Oba Femi	Maxxine Dupri
2025	Harley Cameron	Jacy Jayne	Raquel Rodriguez	Bear Bronson

=== Indie Wrestler of the Year ===
The PWI Indie Wrestler of the Year award recognizes the best wrestler who competes on the independent circuit.

Year	Winner	Runner-up	Second runner-up	Third runner-up
2020	Warhorse	Nick Gage	AJ Gray	Chris Dickinson
2021	Nick Gage	Trish Adora	Tony Deppen	Effy
2022	Matt Cardona	Allie Katch	Trish Adora	Guiseppe Giambini
2023	Matt Cardona (2)	Steph De Lander	Allie Katch	Bryan Keith
2024	Mustafa Ali	Matt Cardona	Mance Warner	Allie Katch
2025	Shotzi Blackheart	Matt Cardona	1 Called Manders	Effy

=== Inspirational Wrestler of the Year ===
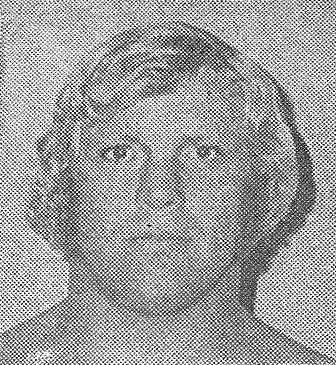
Lord Alfred Hayes was the first recipient

The PWI Inspirational Wrestler of the Year award recognizes the most inspirational professional wrestler of the year. The award has been given yearly since 1972, and in this time, Bob Backlund, Hulk Hogan, Eddie Guerrero, Jerry Lawler, Bayley, and Roman Reigns are the only people to have won the award more than once, with all six winning twice. Generally, the award is originally meant to go to a wrestler who overcomes great odds to achieve success in the ring, however, it has also been awarded to wrestlers who overcome real-life hardships and struggles.

Year	Winner	Runner-up	Second runner-up	Third runner-up
1972	Lord Alfred Hayes	—N/a	—N/a	—N/a
1973	Johnny Valentine	—N/a	—N/a	—N/a
1974	Dick Murdoch	—N/a	—N/a	—N/a
1975	Mike McCord	—N/a	—N/a	—N/a
1976	Bruno Sammartino	Wahoo McDaniel	Bob Roop	Bob Armstrong
1977	Bob Backlund	Don Muraco	Bruno Sammartino	Terry Funk
1978	Blackjack Mulligan	Bruno Sammartino	Mr. Wrestling II	Jim Brunzell
1979	Chief Jay Strongbow	Ric Flair	Mr. Wrestling II	Dusty Rhodes
1980	Junkyard Dog	Ricky Steamboat	Verne Gagne	Mr. Florida
1981	Bob Backlund (2)	Ted DiBiase	Tito Santana	Mr. Wrestling II
1982	Roddy Piper	Jimmy Snuka	Mil Máscaras	Jimmy Valiant
1983	Hulk Hogan	Roddy Piper	Buzz Sawyer	Buddy Rose
1984	Sgt. Slaughter	Kerry Von Erich	Kevin Von Erich	Bob Backlund
1985	Mike Von Erich	Paul Orndorff	Jim Duggan	Kevin Von Erich
1986	Chris Adams	Magnum T. A.	Kerry Von Erich	Steve Williams
1987	Nikita Koloff	Dynamite Kid	Chris Adams	Superstar Billy Graham
1988	Jerry Lawler	Kerry Von Erich	Road Warrior Animal	Jake Roberts
1989	Eric Embry	Nikita Koloff	Billy Jack Haynes	Ric Flair
1990	Sting	Hulk Hogan	Jerry Lawler	Nikolai Volkoff
1991	The Patriot	Jerry Lawler	Sid Justice	Bill Dundee
1992	Ron Simmons	The Undertaker	Ricky Steamboat	Eric Embry
1993	Cactus Jack	Lex Luger	The 1-2-3 Kid	Brutus Beefcake
1994	Bret Hart	Terry Funk	The Guardian Angel	Dave Sullivan
1995	Barry Horowitz	Sabu	Antonio Inoki	Dan Severn
1996	Jake Roberts	Jushin Thunder Liger	Ahmed Johnson	Rey Misterio, Jr.
1997	Terry Funk	Stone Cold Steve Austin	Perry Saturn	Roddy Piper
1998	Goldberg	Stone Cold Steve Austin	Mankind	Shane Douglas
1999	Hulk Hogan (2)	Bret Hart	X-Pac	Jim Duggan
2000	Booker T	Mick Foley	Crash Holly	Chyna
2001	Kurt Angle	Chris Jericho	Shane McMahon	Spike Dudley
2002	Eddie Guerrero	Hollywood Hulk Hogan	Shawn Michaels	Chris Benoit
2003	Zach Gowen	Kurt Angle	A.J. Styles	Rey Mysterio
2004	Eddie Guerrero (2)	Chris Benoit	Eugene	William Regal
2005	Chris Candido	Matt Hardy	Steve Williams	Rey Mysterio
2006	Matt Cappotelli	Rey Mysterio	Hardcore Holly	CM Punk
2007	Jeff Jarrett	CM Punk	John Cena	Sting
2008	Ric Flair	CM Punk	John Cena	Jeff Hardy
2009	Ricky Steamboat	Tommy Dreamer	Sting	John Cena
2010	Shawn Michaels	Kurt Angle	John Cena	Rob Van Dam
2011	Rosita	Gregory Iron	Rob Fury	CM Punk
2012	Jerry Lawler (2)	Austin Aries	Shawn Daivari	John Cena
2013	Darren Young	Dallas Page	Daniel Bryan	John Cena
2014	Daniel Bryan	Eric Young	Chris Melendez	Ashley Sixx
2015	Bayley	John Cena	Kevin Owens	Sami Zayn
2016	Bayley (2)	Cody Rhodes	Seth Rollins	Dean Ambrose
2017	Christopher Daniels	John Cena	Shane McMahon	Mia Yim
2018	Roman Reigns	Cody	Tommy Dreamer	LuFisto
2019	Roman Reigns (2)	Kofi Kingston	PCO	Becky Lynch
2020	Shad Gaspard	Thunder Rosa	Speaking Out movement	Drake Maverick
2021	Edge	Bianca Belair	Big E	Mickie James
2022	Jon Moxley	Liv Morgan	Joe Doering	Josh Alexander
2023	Mark Briscoe	Cody Rhodes	Richard Holliday	Mickie James
2024	Cody Rhodes	Bryan Danielson	Sami Zayn	Jeff Jarrett
2025	Mike Santana	Adam Page	Dustin Rhodes	Jey Uso

=== Rookie of the Year ===
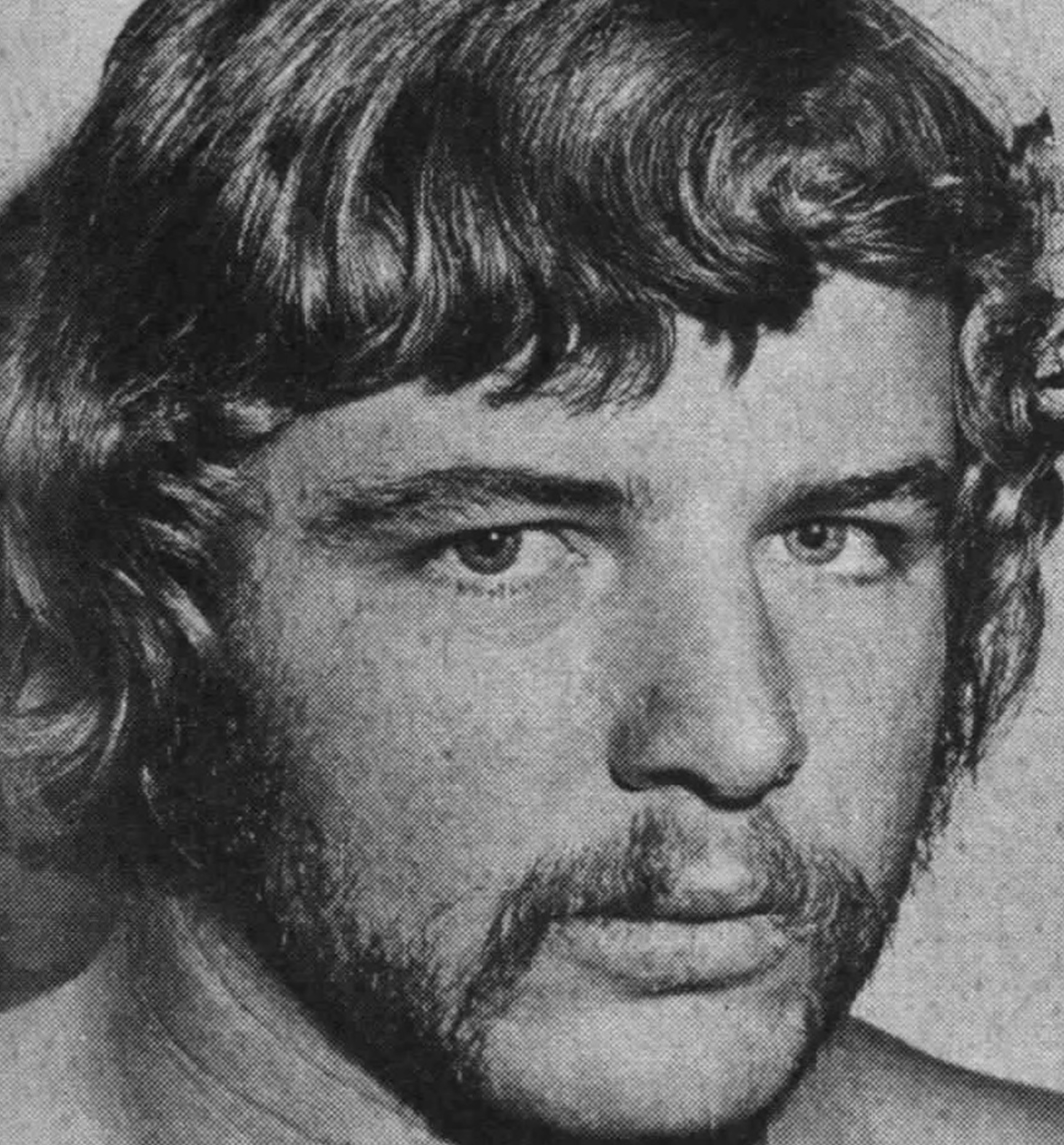
Mike Graham was the first recipient

The PWI Rookie of the Year award recognizes the best professional wrestler of the year who, in that year, had their first year in the business. Since it is a rookie award, wrestlers can qualify only once.

Year	Winner	Runner-up	Second runner-up	Third runner-up
1972	Mike Graham	—N/a	—N/a	—N/a
1973	Bob Orton Jr. / Tony Garea	—N/a	—N/a	—N/a
1974	Larry Zbyszko	—N/a	—N/a	—N/a
1975	Ric Flair	—N/a	—N/a	—N/a
1976	Bob Backlund	Chavo Guerrero	Steve Keirn	Johnny Rivera
1977	Ricky Steamboat	Jimmy Snuka	Big John Studd	Skip Young
1978	Tommy Rich	Jay Youngblood	David Von Erich	Tully Blanchard
1979	Sweet Brown Sugar	Steve Travis	Bryan St. John	Eddie Gilbert
1980	Terry Taylor	Barry Windham	Rick McGraw	Tom Prichard
1981	David Sammartino	Brad Rheingans	Curt Hennig	Ron Richie
1982	Brad Armstrong	Tiger Mask	Mike Rotunda	Kamala
1983	Angelo Mosca Jr.	King Kong Bundy	Scott Armstrong	Arn Anderson
1984	Mike Von Erich	Nikita Koloff	Krusher Khruschev	Kevin Kelly
1985	Nord the Barbarian	Kendall Windham	Starship Eagle	Sam Houston
1986	Lex Luger	Bam Bam Bigelow	Sting	Tom Magee
1987	Owen Hart	Big Bubba Rogers	Shane Douglas	Doug Furnas
1988	Madusa Miceli	Chris Benoit	Maxx Payne	Scott Steiner
1989	The Destruction Crew (Mike Enos & Wayne Bloom)	Dustin Rhodes	Scotty the Body	Johnathan Holliday
1990	Steve Austin	El Gigante	Brad Anderson	Chris Chavis
1991	Johnny B. Badd	The Patriot	Terri Power	The Lightning Kid
1992	Erik Watts	Diamond Dallas Page	Vladimir Koloff	Chaz Taylor
1993	Vampire Warrior	Robbie Eagle	Kent Cole & Keith Cole	The Headhunters
1994	911	Bob Holly	Abbudah Singh	Mikey Whipwreck
1995	Alex Wright	Craig Pittman	Lawrence Taylor	Madd Maxxine
1996	The Giant	Steve McMichael	Rocky Maivia	Joe Gomez
1997	Prince Iaukea	Ernest Miller	Chris Chetti	Brakkus
1998	Bill Goldberg	Sable	Droz	Mark Henry
1999	Shane McMahon	Evan Karagias	Vince McMahon	Lash LeRoux
2000	Kurt Angle	Lita	Sean O'Haire & Mark Jindrak	Chuck Palumbo
2001	Randy Orton	Brock Lesnar	K-Kwik	The Prototype
2002	Maven	Christopher Nowinski	Nidia	Taylor Matheny
2003	Zach Gowen	Sylvain Grenier	Trinity	Matt Morgan
2004	Monty Brown	Petey Williams	Johnny Nitro	Matt Cappotelli
2005	Bobby Lashley	Christy Hemme	Mikey Batts	Ken Doane
2006	The Boogeyman	Charles Evans	Akebono	Cody Runnels
2007	Hornswoggle	Ted DiBiase Jr.	Pelle Primeau	Mike DiBiase
2008	Joe Hennig	Brett DiBiase	Ricky Steamboat, Jr.	Ryan McBride
2009	Mike Sydal	Jesse Neal	Brittney Savage	J.T. Flash
2010	David Otunga	Tamina	Percy Watson	Corey Hollis
2011	Ace Hawkins	Nick Madrid	Leakee	Briley Pierce
2012	Veda Scott	The Big O	Jason Jordan	Bambi Hall
2013	Tim Zbyszko	Cody Hall	Lucipher Lords	Matt King
2014	Charlotte	Enzo Amore	Mojo Rawley	Chad Gable
2015	Moose	Tessa Blanchard	Braun Strowman	Dana Brooke
2016	Nia Jax	Lio Rush	Matt Riddle	Shayna Baszler
2017	Otis Dozovic	Ray González Jr.	Andy Williams	Hirai Kawato
2018	Ronda Rousey	Tomoyuki Oka	Kacy Catanzaro	Taynara Conti
2019	Brian Pillman Jr.	Jessamyn Duke	Utami Hayashishita	Tracy Williams
2020	Dominik Mysterio	Anna Jay	Joshua Wavra	Abadon
2021	Jade Cargill	Bron Breakker	Bad Bunny	Brock Anderson
2022	Hook	Logan Paul	Paige VanZant	Tony D'Angelo
2023	Sol Ruca	Ava Raine	Toga	Gabby Forza
2024	Kelani Jordan	Jaida Parker	Karmen Petrovic	Oleg Boltin
2025	Kendal Grey	The Texas Outlaws (Wayne Rhodes & Wyatt Rhodes)	Rhys Maddox	Kali Armstrong

=== Stanley Weston Award (Lifetime Achievement) ===
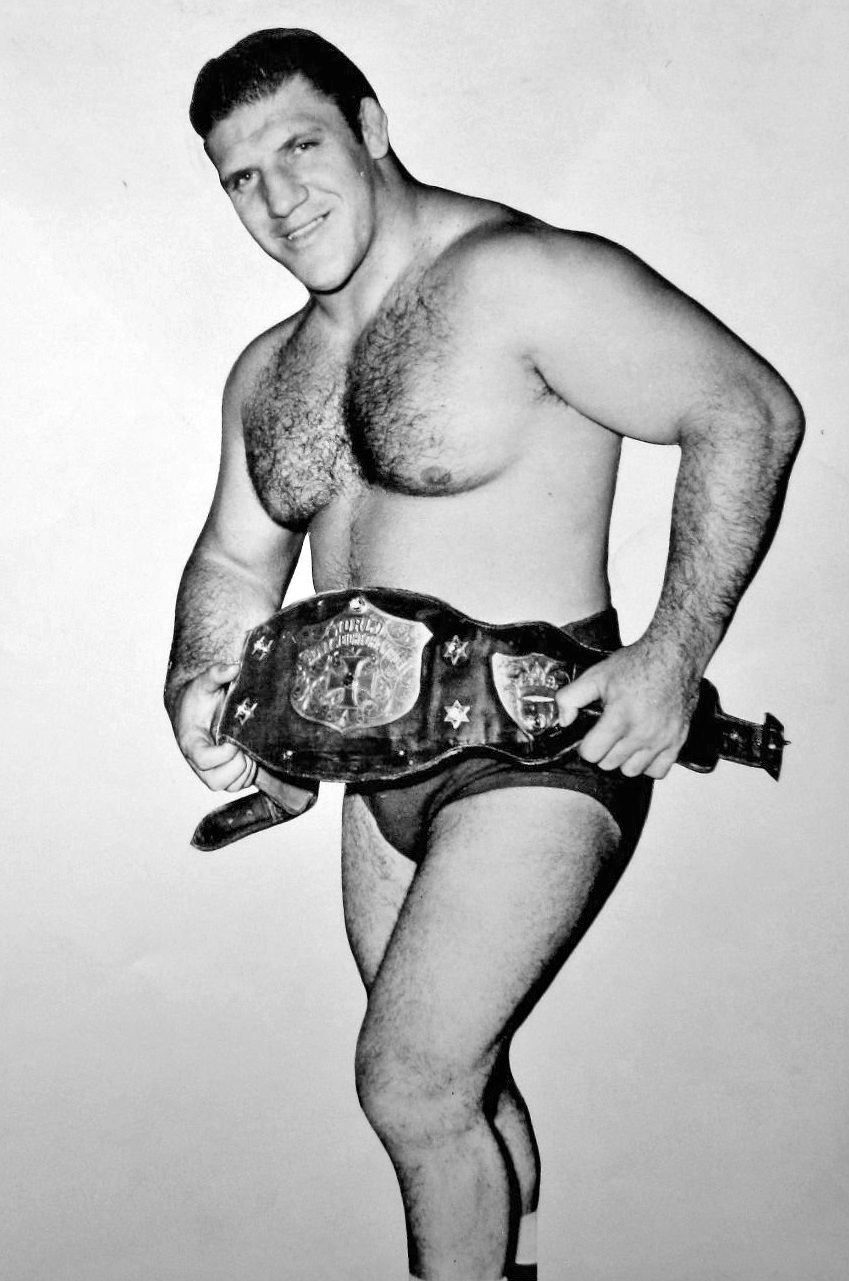
Bruno Sammartino was the first recipient

The PWI Stanley Weston Award recognizes lifetime achievement by a professional wrestling personality. It has been given yearly since 1981, originally known as the PWI Editor's Award, and it's considered the magazine highest honor. Beginning with the March 2003 year-end edition, the award was renamed in memory of PWI founder and longtime publisher Stanley Weston, who died in 2002. In 2020, PWI announced it would begin naming two winners per year.

† indicates a posthumous award
Year	Winner (birth name)
1981	Bruno Sammartino
1982	Lou Thesz (Aloysius Thesz)
1983	The Grand Wizard (Irwin Roth)†
1984	David Von Erich (David Adkisson)†
1985	Dan Shocket
1986	Verne Gagne (Laverne Gagne)
1987	Paul Boesch
1988	Bruiser Brody (Frank Goodish)†; Adrian Adonis (Keith Franke Jr.)†
1989	Gordon Solie (Francis Labiak)
1990	Buddy Rogers (Herman Rohde Jr.)
1991	The Fabulous Moolah (Mary Ellison)
1992	Stanley Weston
1993	André the Giant (André Roussimoff)†
1994	Captain Lou Albano (Louis Albano)
1995	Ricky Steamboat (Richard Blood Sr.)
1996	Danny Hodge (Daniel Hodge)
1997	Arn Anderson (Martin Lunde)
1998	Bobo Brazil (Houston Harris)†
1999	Owen Hart†
2000	Freddie Blassie (Frederick Blassie)
2001	Johnny Valentine (John Wisniski)†
2002	Jim Ross (James Ross)
2003	Bret Hart
2004	Pat Patterson (Pierre Clermont)
2005	Eddie Guerrero (Eduardo Guerrero)†
2006	Harley Race
2007	Nick Bockwinkel (Nicholas Bockwinkel)
2008	Ric Flair (Richard Fliehr)
2009	Vince McMahon (Vincent McMahon)
2010	Killer Kowalski (Edward Spulnik)†
2011	Randy Savage (Randy Poffo)†
2012	Bobby Heenan (Raymond Heenan)
2013	Dusty Rhodes (Virgil Runnels Jr.)
2014	Dory Funk Jr. (Dorrance Funk Jr.)
2015	Roddy Piper (Roderick Toombs)†
2016	Dick Beyer
2017	Jack Brisco (Freddie Joe Brisco)†
2018	Antonio Inoki (Kanji Inoki)
2019	Stone Cold Steve Austin (Steven James Anderson)
2020	Madusa (Debrah Ann Miceli); Stu Saks
2021	Terry Funk (Terrence Funk); Ron Simmons (Ronald Simmons)
2022	Manami Toyota; Bill Apter (William Stanley Apter); George Napolitano (George Napolitano)
2023	Sting (Steven Borden); Nancy Benoit†
2024	Booker T (Booker T. Huffman Jr.); Mickie James (Mickie Laree James); Gail Kim (Gail Kim-Irvine); Dave Meltzer
2025	Shawn Michaels (Michael Shawn Hickenbottom); Bryan Danielson (Bryan Lloyd Danielson)

== Decade awards ==
=== 2000s ===
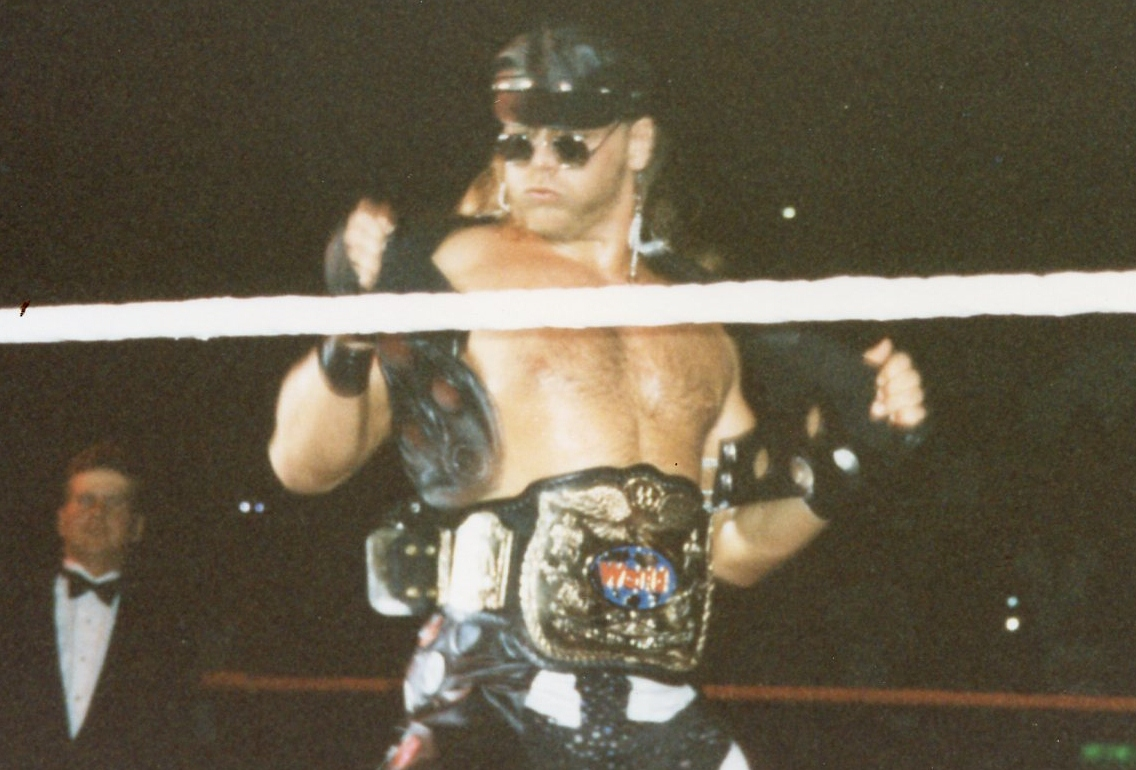
Shawn Michaels was voted Inspirational Wrestler, Feud and Match of the Decade (2000s)

Category	Winner
Wrestler of the Decade	Triple H
Tag Team of the Decade	The Dudley Boyz (Bubba Ray Dudley & D-Von Dudley)
Match of the Decade	Ric Flair vs. Shawn Michaels at WrestleMania XXIV
Woman of the Decade	Trish Stratus
Feud of the Decade	Shawn Michaels vs. Chris Jericho
Most Popular Wrestler of the Decade	John Cena
Most Hated Wrestler of the Decade	Triple H
Inspirational Wrestler of the Decade	Shawn Michaels
Pay-Per-View of the Decade	WrestleMania X-Seven

=== 2010s ===
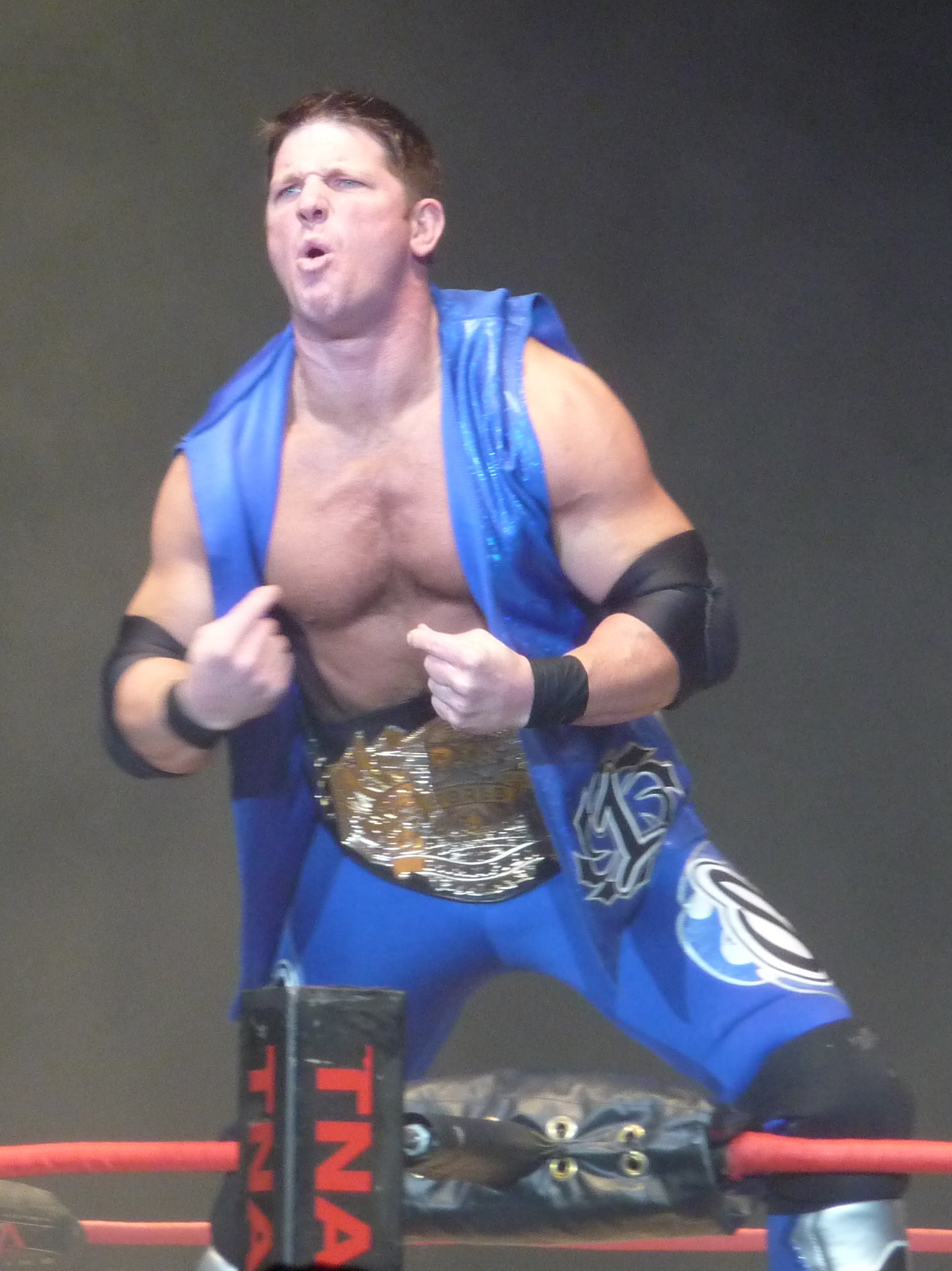
AJ Styles was voted Wrestler of the 2010s

Category	Winner
Wrestler of the Decade	AJ Styles
Tag Team of the Decade	The New Day (Kofi Kingston, Big E & Xavier Woods)
Match of the Decade	The Undertaker vs. Shawn Michaels at WrestleMania XXVI
Woman of the Decade	Charlotte Flair
Feud of the Decade	Kenny Omega vs. Kazuchika Okada
Most Popular Wrestler of the Decade	John Cena
Most Hated Wrestler of the Decade	Brock Lesnar
Inspirational Wrestler of the Decade	Daniel Bryan
Pay-Per-View of the Decade	WrestleMania 31

== Defunct awards ==
=== Midget Wrestler of the Year ===
The PWI Midget Wrestler of the Year award recognized the best midget wrestler of the year. This award became defunct in 1976.

Year	Winner	Runner-up	Second runner-up	Third runner-up
1972	Little Bruiser	—N/a	—N/a	—N/a
1973	Little Beaver	—N/a	—N/a	—N/a
1974	Darlin' Dagmar	—N/a	—N/a	—N/a
1975	Sky Low Low	—N/a	—N/a	—N/a
1976	Lord Littlebrook	Sky Low Low	Cowboy Lang	Diamond Lil

=== Manager of the Year ===
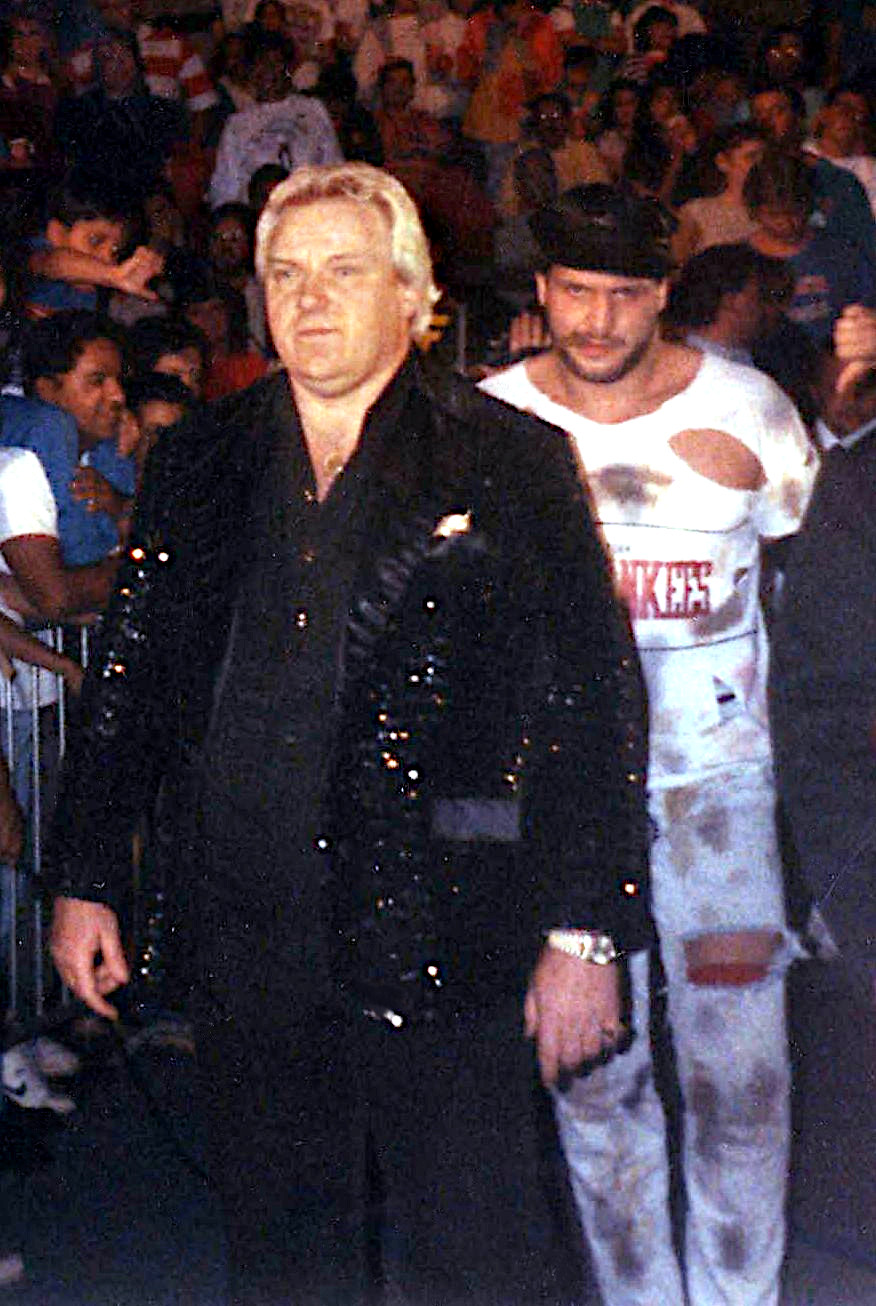
Bobby Heenan (left) is a four-time winner of the category

The PWI Manager of the Year award recognized the best manager of the year. Bobby Heenan won a record four times. Lou Albano, J. J. Dillon, and Jim Cornette each won three times.

Year	Winner	Runner-up	Second runner-up	Third runner-up
1972	Bobby Heenan	—N/a	—N/a	—N/a
1973	The Grand Wizard	—N/a	—N/a	—N/a
1974	Lou Albano	—N/a	—N/a	—N/a
1975	George Cannon	—N/a	—N/a	—N/a
1976	Bobby Heenan (2)	Lou Albano	Freddie Blassie	Gary Hart
1977	The Grand Wizard (2)	Bobby Heenan	Lou Albano	Lord Alfred Hayes
1978	Arnold Skaaland	The Grand Wizard	Bobby Heenan	Gary Hart
1979	Arnold Skaaland (2)	Lou Albano	Buddy Rogers	Oliver Humperdink
1980	Oliver Humperdink	Arnold Skaaland	Lou Albano	The Great Mephisto
1981	Lou Albano (2)	Arnold Skaaland	Oliver Humperdink	The Grand Wizard
1982	J. J. Dillon	Arnold Skaaland	Sonny King	Jimmy Hart
1983	J. J. Dillon (2)	Adnan Al-Kaissie	Lou Albano	Paul Ellering
1984	Paul Ellering	Jimmy Hart	Jim Cornette	J. J. Dillon
1985	Jim Cornette	Lou Albano	Paul Ellering	Bobby Heenan
1986	Lou Albano (3)	Paul Ellering	Miss Elizabeth	Jim Cornette
1987	Jimmy Hart	J. J. Dillon	Jim Cornette	Paul E. Dangerously
1988	J. J. Dillon (3)	Miss Elizabeth	Jim Cornette	Paul E. Dangerously
1989	Bobby Heenan (3)	Gary Hart	Teddy Long	Skandor Akbar
1990	Teddy Long	Bobby Heenan	Ole Anderson	Jim Cornette
1991	Bobby Heenan (4)	Harley Race	Alexandra York	Paul Bearer
1992	Paul E. Dangerously	Mr. Perfect	Harley Race	Jim Cornette
1993	Jim Cornette (2)	Harley Race	Mr. Fuji	Tammy Sytch
1994	Jimmy Hart (2)	Ted DiBiase	Col. Robert Parker	Paul E. Dangerously
1995	Jim Cornette (3)	Sherri Martel	Col. Robert Parker	Woman
1996	Sunny	Jimmy Hart	Jim Cornette	Bill Alfonso
1997	Bill Alfonso	Miss Jacquelyn	Paul Heyman	Ted DiBiase
1998	Paul Bearer	Bill Alfonso	Sunny	Paul Ellering
1999	Debra	Jimmy Hart	Bill Alfonso	Paul Bearer

=== Announcer of the Year ===
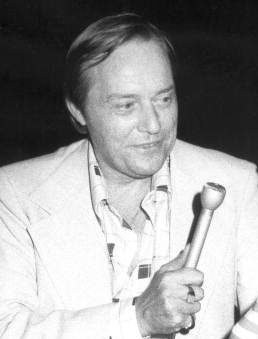
Gordon Solie is the only winner of the category

The PWI Announcer of the Year award recognized the best announcer of the year. This award was only given in 1977.

Year	Winner	Runner-up	Second runner-up	Third runner-up
1977	Gordon Solie	Vince McMahon	Bill Carlisle	Roger Kent

== See also ==
- List of professional wrestling awards
- List of Wrestling Observer Newsletter awards
- Slammy Award
