= Eddy Mansfield =

American professional wrestler

Personal information
- Born: Edwin E. Mansfield San Antonio, Texas, U.S.

Professional wrestling career
- Ring name(s): Eddy Mansfield; Eddie Mansfield
- Billed height: 6 ft 0 in (1.83 m)
- Billed weight: 231 lb (105 kg)
- Debut: 1977
- Retired: 1980s

Edwin E. Mansfield, better known as Eddy Mansfield, is an American former professional wrestler.

== Career ==
Mansfield debuted in 1977 wrestling with Central States Wrestling, and NWA St. Louis.

He became known for his tenure in the Florida territory, where he defeated Tommy Gilbert, for the NWA Florida Television Championship in 1981.

== Championships and accomplishments ==
- Championship Wrestling from Florida
  - NWA Florida Television Championship (1 time)
