= 3rd Von Erich Memorial Parade of Champions =

- Promotion: World Class Wrestling Association
- Date: May 4, 1986
- City: Irving, Texas
- Venue: Texas Stadium
- Attendance: 24,121

Event chronology
← Previous; Wrestling Star Wars	Next → Independence Day Star Wars

Parade of Champions chronology
← Previous; 1985	Next → 1987

The 3rd Von Erich Memorial Parade of Champions was a major professional wrestling supercard event held by the World Championship Wrestling Association (WCWA) on May 4, 1986 at the Texas Stadium in Irving, Texas. The event was held by WCWA promoter Fritz Von Erich in memory of his son David Von Erich who died in 1984. It was the eighth event in the Parade of Champions chronology and the first under the WCWA banner. It was also the first major supercard after the promotion left National Wrestling Alliance and rebranded from WCCW to WCWA in February 1986.

Ten professional wrestling matches were contested at the event including eight televised matches. The main event was a lumberjack elimination match, in which Fabulous Freebirds (Michael Hayes, Terry Gordy and Buddy Roberts) defended the WCWA World Six-Man Tag Team Championship against Steve Simpson, Kerry Von Erich and Lance Von Erich. Simpson, Kerry and Lance won the match and the titles. In other prominent matches on the card, Rick Rude retained the WCWA World Heavyweight Championship against Bruiser Brody via a disqualification, Bruiser Brody defeated Terry Gordy in a barbed wire match and Brian Adias defeated Steve Regal to retain the WCWA Texas Heavyweight Championship.

== Event ==
The event started with a women's mud match, in which Sunshine defeated Missy Hyatt. The match is not televised and is not included in the video footage.

=== Preliminary matches ===
The televised event opened with a handicap gauntlet match by The Great Kabuki, in which he would be facing a total of four wrestlers including Mark Youngblood, Jerry Allen, Steve Simpson and Chris Adams. Kabuki would be facing one wrestler at a time. His first opponent was Youngblood, whom Kabuki pinned after a superkick and a chop. Allen was the next to enter. Kabuki applied a nerve hold on Allen and pinned him with the hold. Simpson entered the match next. Simpson pinned Kabuki with a sunset flip by diving off the apron into the ring. Kabuki and Hayes attacked Simpson after the match until Adams made the save but was double teamed by the two. Kabuki accidentally hit a sole kick to Hayes.

Next, the first championship match of the event occurred as Brian Adias defended the Texas Heavyweight Championship against Steve Regal. Adias pinned Regal with a victory roll to retain the title.

In the following match, Chris Adams and Brickhouse Brown took on John Tatum and The Grappler. Grappler loaded his boot after tossing Adams out of the ring but Adams tripped Grappler and delivered a slingshot splash to Grappler through the apron for the win. Missy Hyatt confronted Adams after the match by repeatedly slapping him in the ring until Brown made the save.

It was followed by a non-televised tag team match, in which The Missing Link and King Parsons defeated One Man Gang and Skandor Akbar.

Later, Bruiser Brody took on Terry Gordy in a barbed wire match. Gordy nailed Brody with an Asian spike, knocking him in the opposite corner. The referee tried to take the spike away from Gordy but Brody kicked and the spike fell. Brody then hit Gordy with the spike and pinned him for the win.

In the next match, Brody challenged Rick Rude for the World Heavyweight Championship. Rude's manager Percy Pringle III pushed Brody's leg off the bottom rope during a pinfall attempt by Rude. This angered Brody, who chased Pringle and diverted his focus on attacking him. Rude tried to attack Brody but Brody tossed him over the top rope and the referee disqualified Brody. As a result, Rude retained the title.

=== Main event match ===
The main event was a lumberjack elimination match, in which Fabulous Freebirds (Michael Hayes, Terry Gordy and Buddy Roberts) defended the World Six-Man Tag Team Championship against Steve Simpson, Kerry Von Erich and Lance Von Erich. After a double clothesline by Freebirds, Gordy pinned Kerry to eliminate him. Simpson pinned Hayes with a sunset flip to eliminate him. However, Simpson was quickly double teamed by Freebirds and Roberts pinned him for the elimination, leaving only Lance against the Freebirds. Lance sent Gordy over the top rope by hitting a dropkick and it was declared an elimination for Gordy. Lance then applied an Iron Claw on Roberts to pin him and win the World Six-Man Tag Team Championship for his team.

== Reception ==
While the attendance was lower as compared to the previous events, Parade of Champions was nonetheless a huge success, drawing a crowd of 24,121 with a revenue of $193,108 from ticket sales. It was the last Parade of Champions to draw a huge audience as the next year's edition had an audience of only 5,900.

The event received mixed reviews from critics.

Gary of Blog of Doom praised the event as a "Fun show that proved the WCWA could still hold a major show without the NWA being involved." He praised the six-man tag team main event as "a great match with a hot crowd that helped to make Lance look good in the fans’ eyes. With Kevin sidelined and Kerry pinned early, the underdog team of Lance and Simpson overcoming the odds told a great story." He praised the barbed wire match as a "Bloody brawl that helped to encourage ticket sales." According to him, Adams and Brown versus Tatum and Grappler had a "Good finish that popped the crowd." He specifically praised Brown for doing "a good job." He also appreciated the Texas Heavyweight Championship match between Adias and Regal as a "Solid match between these two grapplers."

Arnold Furious considered it "The worst WCCW show". According to him "The (Great) Kabuki gauntlet was terrible. It only served to help get Steve Simpson over." He felt that the Texas Heavyweight Championship match "was fine but a little dull." However, he praised Adams and Brown versus Tatum and Grappler as match of the night but criticized the World Heavyweight Championship match between Rude and Brody as "short with a bad finish." He panned that the six-man tag team main event and criticized the booking of Lance Von Erich's win in the end, and felt it was a wrong booking decision to push him as a top performer.

== Aftermath ==
Von Erichs continued their feud against Fabulous Freebirds after the event as Kevin Von Erich and Lance Von Erich defeated Buddy Roberts and Michael Hayes in a first blood match on May 18.

Sunshine and Missy Hyatt competed in a rematch of their mud match at Parade of Champions on May 18, with Sunshine winning again.

Bruiser Brody and Rick Rude continued their rivalry after the event, as Brody received another title shot against Rick Rude, this time for the WCWA Television Championship on May 19. Brody defeated Rude via disqualification to win the title.

Chris Adams and Steve Simpson continued to feud with The Great Kabuki and Michael Hayes after Parade of Champions, eventually defeating them in a tag team match on May 19.

== Results ==
No.	Results	Stipulations	Times
1^{D}	Sunshine defeated Missy Hyatt	Mud match	—
2	The Great Kabuki (with Michael Hayes) defeated Mark Youngblood	Singles match (Gauntlet #1)	3:21
3	The Great Kabuki (with Michael Hayes) defeated Jerry Allen	Singles match (Gauntlet #2)	1:55
4	Steve Simpson defeated The Great Kabuki (with Michael Hayes)	Singles match (Gauntlet #3)	4:06
5	Brian Adias (c) defeated Steve Regal	Singles match for the WCWA Texas Heavyweight Championship	13:00
6	Chris Adams and Brickhouse Brown defeated John Tatum and The Grappler (with Missy Hyatt)	Tag team match	12:00
7^{D}	The Missing Link and King Parsons defeated One Man Gang and Skandor Akbar	Tag team match	—
8	Bruiser Brody defeated Terry Gordy	Barbed wire match	—
9	Rick Rude (c) (with Percy Pringle III) defeated Bruiser Brody by disqualification	Singles match for the WCWA World Heavyweight Championship	07:30
10	Steve Simpson, Kerry Von Erich and Lance Von Erich defeated the Fabulous Freebirds (Michael Hayes, Terry Gordy and Buddy Roberts) (c)	Lumberjack elimination match for the WCWA World Six-Man Tag Team Championship	—
(c) / – the champion(s) heading into the match; D / – this was a dark match

=== Lumberjack match eliminations ===
Eliminated	Wrestler	Eliminated by	Method
1	Kerry Von Erich	Terry Gordy	Pinned after a double clothesline
2	Michael Hayes	Steve Simpson	Pinned with a sunset flip
3	Steve Simpson	Buddy Roberts	Pinned after a turnbuckle shot
4	Terry Gordy	Lance Von Erich	Eliminated over the top rope after a dropkick
5	Buddy Roberts	Lance Von Erich	Pinned with an Iron Claw

== See also ==
- 1986 in professional wrestling
