= Kelly Kiniski =

Canadian-American professional wrestler

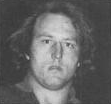

Personal information
- Born: May 27, 1960 (age 66) Calgary, Alberta, Canada

Professional wrestling career
- Ring name(s): Kelly Kiniski; Ben Sharpe (II)
- Billed height: 6 ft 3 in (1.91 m)
- Billed weight: 260 lb (120 kg)
- Trained by: Gene Kiniski
- Debut: 1980
- Retired: 1987

Kelly Kiniski (born May 27, 1960) is a Canadian-born American retired professional wrestler. He is the elder son of the legendary wrestler Gene Kiniski and is best known for his work with Mid-Atlantic Championship Wrestling and WCCW.

== Career ==
=== Early career ===
Kelly Kiniski was trained by his father, former world champion Gene Kiniski. He made his professional debut with Stampede Wrestling on August 1, 1980, in Calgary, defeating Texas Red Miller. On December 26, 1980, he teamed with his father to defeat Moose Morowski and The Destroyer in an NWA All-Star Wrestling tag team match in Vancouver, British Columbia. He spent his first year in the sport competing primarily in Canada, splitting his time between Stampede and NWA All-Star.

=== Mid-Atlantic Championship Wrestling and Mid South (1982-1984) ===
In 1982, Kelly debuted in Mid-Atlantic Championship Wrestling. but had a short set of matches later that year in Mid South Wrestling before returning to MACW In 1983, he formed a tag team with One Man Gang. They defeated Mike Rotunda and Rufus R. Jones in a tournament final on May 23, 1983, to win the vacant NWA Mid-Atlantic Tag Team Championship. On July 20, 1983, they lost the titles to Rufus R. Jones and Bugsy McGraw. Kelly and OMG challenged Jones and McGraw in several rematches but were unsuccessful in regaining the belts.

=== World Class Championship Wrestling (1984-1987) ===
In early 1984, Kelly Kiniski signed for Dallas, Texas based World Class Championship Wrestling which was owned by Fritz Von Erich, who was one of Gene Kiniski's best friends. When Fritz's son Jackie died of electrocution and drowned in a puddle of melted snow, it was Gene Kiniski who broke the news to Fritz, thus prompting Fritz to break a car window with his fist. He defeated Iceman King Parsons on February 20, 1984, to win the WCCW Television Championship. On May 7, 1984, Kiniski, who had previously been injured, gave the title to Killer Khan to defend in a match against Johnny Mantell. At WCCW's Christmas Star Wars event on December 25, 1984, he defeated Rock "N" Roll Buck Zumhofe. He wrestled for WCCW, as well as later competing in the American Wrestling Association, until 1987 and then retired from pro wrestling.

== Championships and accomplishments ==
- Mid-Atlantic Championship Wrestling
  - NWA Mid-Atlantic Tag Team Championship (1 time) - with One Man Gang
- World Class Championship Wrestling
  - WCCW Television Championship (1 time)
