= 2019 Mall of America murder attempt =

2019 attempted murder in Bloomington, Minnesota

Coordinates: 44.8535°N 93.2406°W

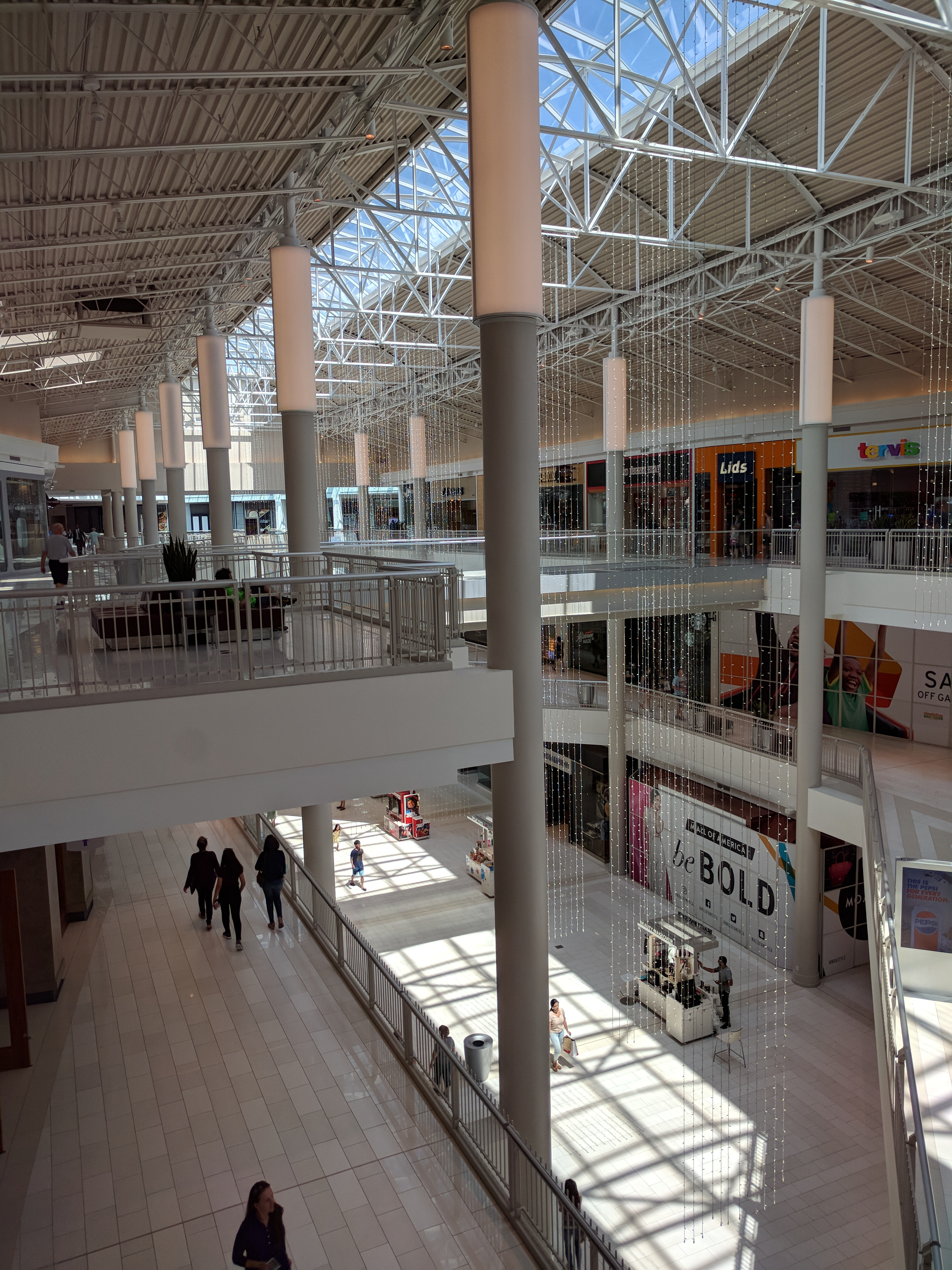
- Interior of the Mall of America from the third floor
- Date: April 12, 2019
- Time: Around 10 a.m.
- Venue: Mall of America
- Location: Bloomington, Minnesota
- Motive: Anger over rejection by women
- Perpetrator: Emmanuel Deshawn Aranda
- Deaths: 0
- Injuries: 1, Landen Hoffmann
- Arrests: 1
- Charges: Attempted murder
- Sentence: 19 years in prison

On April 12, 2019, five-year-old Landen Hoffmann was tossed from the third floor at Mall of America in Bloomington, Minnesota. Falling around 40 feet (12 m), the boy suffered life-threatening injuries. Emmanuel Aranda, a 24-year-old man from Minneapolis, was charged with attempted murder. In June 2019, Aranda was sentenced to 19 years in prison. The boy underwent multiple surgeries for broken bones and injured organs. He was able to return to his school in time for his first day of kindergarten that autumn.

== Attack ==
Around 10 a.m. on April 12, 2019, a man approached five-year-old Landen Hoffmann and his mother Kari, who were standing near the Rainforest Café on the third floor of the Mall of America. Landen's mother asked the man if they were in his way, and the man responded by picking up Landen and throwing him over the edge of the balcony. He fell nearly 40 feet (12 m), suffering life-threatening injuries. Police immediately administered first aid to the child, who was subsequently transported to the Minneapolis Children's Hospital.

The man attempted to flee, but was caught by police trying to board a light rail train at Mall of America station. Emmanuel Deshawn Aranda (born August 23, 1994), a 24-year-old man from Minneapolis, told police that he was angry after being rejected by women and was planning to kill an adult standing near the balcony, but opted for the boy instead. Security footage showed that Aranda had approached the edge of the balcony several times before walking up to Landen.

== Perpetrator ==
Aranda had a history of arrests at the mall. In 2015, he had been arrested after throwing objects from the mall's upper levels, and received a one-year trespass order. He was arrested again at the mall just a few weeks later after harassing two women and throwing items at patrons in a mall restaurant. He had also been arrested several times in Illinois for assault, theft, and property damage. Aranda had also been subject to court-ordered mental health treatment. One day prior to the 2019 attack he visited the mall with the intention to kill an adult but was unsuccessful. Following his arrest, he stated that he had often visited the mall seeking to speak to women, but their rejections of him made him lash out.

Aranda was charged with attempted first-degree murder on April 15, 2019. His bail was set at $2 million. One month later, Aranda pled guilty. The prosecutor's office sought the maximum punishment of 19 years in prison. He received the full 19-year sentence on June 3, 2019. As of 2025, he is incarcerated at MCF Moose Lake. He is expected to be released from prison in 2031 and serve the remainder of his sentence under court supervision.

== Victim ==
Landen Hoffmann, five years old at the time of the attack, received surgeries for broken arms, a broken leg, and skull fractures; his spleen was also removed. A GoFundMe page for medical costs raised more than $1 million. After two weeks in critical condition, Landen was announced to be "alert and conscious" by his family. Landen was released from the hospital in August, and attended his first day of kindergarten five days later. By November, he was walking without a limp. Landen suffered amnesia and does not remember the incident; the trauma to his frontal lobe caused his personality to shift from shy and quiet to more loud and impulsive.

In 2021, the family filed a lawsuit against the Mall of America, citing negligence and seeking remuneration for medical costs and pain and suffering. The medical bills were alleged to be in excess of $1.75 million. The family alleged that mall security was negligent in not preventing Aranda from prowling about the mall due to their knowledge of his previous violent and aggressive behavior. A confidential settlement was reached with the mall in December 2022.

After telling Good Morning America that Alex Ovechkin was his favorite hockey player, Landen, a fan of the Minnesota Wild, was invited to meet Ovechkin and Kirill Kaprizov after a Wild game in March 2023.
