= Minnesota Correctional Facility – Willow River/Moose Lake =

Prison in Minnesota, United States

Coordinates: 46°26′26″N 92°45′37″W

Minnesota Correctional Facility – Moose Lake (MCF-Moose Lake)
- Interactive map of Minnesota Correctional Facility – Moose Lake (MCF-Moose Lake)
- Location: Moose Lake, Minnesota
- Status: Operational
- Security class: Medium
- Population: 1,029 (February 02, 2023)
- Opened: 1988
- Managed by: Minnesota Department of Corrections
- Director: Brian Collins, Warden

Minnesota Correctional Facility – Willow River (MCF-Willow River)
- Interactive map of Minnesota Correctional Facility – Willow River (MCF-Willow River)
- Location: Willow River, Minnesota
- Status: Operational
- Security class: Boot camp (correctional)
- Population: 134 (February 02, 2023)
- Managed by: Minnesota Department of Corrections
- Director: Brian Collins, Warden

The Minnesota Correctional Facility – Willow River/Moose Lake is a two-site prison operated by the Minnesota Department of Corrections in Pine and Carlton counties.

The Moose Lake men's prison is located on the former site of the Moose Lake Regional Treatment Center in Moose Lake, Minnesota.

The Willow River facility, also for men, is located in Willow River, Minnesota. In 1992, the state's Challenge Incarceration Program (CIP), a military-style boot camp correctional program, began at the site. Only the first of three phases takes place at the Willow River facility.

== Notable Inmates ==
| Inmate Name | Register Number | Status | Details |
|---|---|---|---|
| David Brom | 146854 | Released. | Murdered his parents and brother and sister in 1988. |
| Emmanuel Deshawn Aranda | 259515 | 19 year sentence | Attempted murder of a five-year-old boy at the Mall of America |
| Eugene Otto Zumhofe | 146235 | Four Consecutive 25 Year Sentences | Buck Zumhofe, a former professional wrestler, was found guilty on 12 felony counts of criminal sexual conduct, with allegations of abuse starting when he was living with a close family member who was 15 years old. The victim reported that there were hundreds of acts of sexual abuse over a period of years from 1999 to 2011. Zumhofe's actions have been described as extreme, and he has shown no remorse for his actions. |
