= WCWA Television Championship =

Professional wrestling championship

Details
- Promotion: NWA Big Time Wrestling (1979-1982); World Class Championship Wrestling (1982-1986); World Class Wrestling Association (1986-1987)
- Date established: January 7, 1979
- Date retired: April 1987

Other names
- NWA Television Championship (Texas version); WCCW Television Championship
Statistics
- First champion: The Spoiler
- Final champion: Tony Atlas
- Most reigns: Bill Irwin (7 times)

The WCWA Television Championship was a secondary professional wrestling championship that was used and defended in the World Class Wrestling Association (WCWA). Originally created in 1979 as the NWA Television Championship, one of many television championships across the NWA territories, it was primarily defended on their weekly television show. At the time of its creation the championship was promoted by NWA Big Time Wrestling (BTW). BTW changed its name to "World Class Championship Wrestling" (WCCW) in 1982 and the championship became known as the WCCW Television Championship. In 1986 WCCW withdrew from the NWA and became known as the World Class Wrestling Association. As it is a professional wrestling championship, it is won not by actual competition, but by a scripted ending to a match. (Note: Hornbaker (2016) p. 550: "Professional wrestling is a sport in which match finishes are predetermined. Thus, win–loss records are not indicative of a wrestler's genuine success based on their legitimate abilities – but on now much, or how little they were pushed by promoters")

The first NWA Television Champion was The Spoiler, who won a battle royal on January 7, 1979, to claim the championship. Bill Irwin won the championship a record-setting seven times between 1979 and 1982. Irwin's second reign lasted 181 days, the longest individual reign of any of the champions and his combined reigns total at least 464 days, possibly 467 days. Kevin Von Erich was awarded the championship due to a disqualification, but refused to win the championship in such manner and immediately vacated it, putting his reign at only a couple of minutes, the shortest of any champion. After the final champion, Tony Atlas, left the company, the Championship was abandoned in April 1987.

== Title history ==
Key
No.	Overall reign number
Reign	Reign number for the specific champion
Days	Number of days held
N/A	Unknown information
†	Championship change is unrecognized by the promotion

No.	Champion	Championship change			Reign statistics		Notes	Ref.
No.	Champion	Date	Event	Location	Reign	Days	Notes	Ref.
NWA Television Championship (Texas version)
1	The Spoiler	January 7, 1979	BTW show	Houston, Texas	1	146	Won the championship in a battle royal	
2	Bill Irwin	June 2, 1979	BTW show	Houston, Texas	1	181		
3	José Lothario	November 30, 1979	BTW show	Texas	1	43		
4	Bill Irwin	January 12, 1980	BTW show	Dallas, Texas	2	62		
5	José Lothario	March 14, 1980	BTW show	Texas	2	140		
6	Bill Irwin	August 1, 1980	BTW show	Houston, Texas	3	163		
7	Brian Adias	January 11, 1981	BTW show	Dallas, Texas	1	120		
8	Bill Irwin	May 11, 1981	BTW show	Ft. Worth, Texas	4	4		
—	Vacated	May 15, 1981	—	—	—	—	Championship vacated for undocumented reasons	
WCCW Television Championship
9	The Spoiler	May 17, 1982	WCCW show	Ft. Worth, Texas	2	1	Won the vacant championship by winning a battle royal.	
10	Frank Dusek	May 18, 1982	WCCW show	Texas	1	25		
11	The Spoiler	June 12, 1982	WCCW show	Ft. Worth, Texas	3	23		
12	Bill Irwin	July 5, 1982	WCCW show	Ft. Worth, Texas	5	5		
13	Brian Adias	July 10, 1982	WCCW show	Texas	2	9		
14	Bill Irwin	July 19, 1982	WCCW show	Texas	6	48		
15	Bugsy McGraw	September 5, 1982	WCCW show	Ft. Worth, Texas	1	(Note: The exact date on which Bugsy McGraw lost the title is unknown, which means the title reign lasted between 26 and 29 days.)		
16	Bill Irwin	October 1982	WCCW show	Texas	7	(Note: The exact date on which Bill Iwrin won the title is unknown, which means the title reign lasted between 0 and 3 days.)		
17	Checkmate	October 4, 1982	WCCW show	Ft. Worth, Texas	1	(Note: The exact date on which Checkmate vacated the title is unknown, which means the title reign lasted between 0 and 27 days.)		
Championship history is unrecorded from to October 1982.
18	Frank Dusek	October 1982	WCCW show	Texas	2	(Note: The exact date on which Frank Dusek won the title is unknown, which means the title reign lasted between 2 and 28 days.)		
19	Al Madril	November 1, 1982	WCCW show	Ft. Worth, Texas	1	63		
20	The Great Kabuki	January 3, 1983	WCCW show	Ft. Worth, Texas	1	35		
21	N'Tola Yatsu	February 7, 1983	WCCW show	Ft. Worth, Texas	1	49		
22	Iceman Parsons	March 28, 1983	WCCW show	Ft. Worth, Texas	1	63		
23	The Mongol	May 30, 1983	WCCW show	Ft. Worth, Texas	1	42		
24	Chris Adams	July 11, 1983	WCCW show	Ft. Worth, Texas	1	105		
25	Jimmy Garvin	October 24, 1983	WCCW show	Ft. Worth, Texas	1	7		
26	Johnny Mantell	October 31, 1983	WCCW show	Ft. Worth, Texas	1	28		
27	The Super Destroyer	November 28, 1983	WCCW show	Ft. Worth, Texas	1	7		
28	Brian Adias	December 5, 1983	WCCW show	Ft. Worth, Texas	3	35		
29	The Super Destroyer	January 9, 1984	WCCW show	Ft. Worth, Texas	2	28		
30	Iceman Parsons	February 6, 1984	WCCW show	Ft. Worth, Texas	2	14		
31	Kelly Kiniski	February 20, 1984	WCCW show	Ft. Worth, Texas	1	77		
32	Killer Khan	May 7, 1984	WCCW show	Ft. Worth, Texas	1	14	Defended the championship on behalf of an injured Kiniski and was awarded the belt.	
33	Kevin Von Erich	May 21, 1984	WCCW show	Ft. Worth, Texas	1	0	Won the title by disqualification.	
—	Vacated	May 21, 1984	—	—	—	—	Kevin Von Erich vacated championship as he did not want to win the title by disqualification.	
34	Chris Adams	June 11, 1984	WCCW show	Ft. Worth, Texas	2	63	Defeated Kelly Kiniski.	
35	Jake Roberts	August 13, 1984	WCCW show	Ft. Worth, Texas	1	21		
36	Chris Adams	September 3, 1984	Labor Day Star Wars	Ft. Worth, Texas	3	126		
37	Billy Haynes	January 7, 1985	WCCW show	Ft. Worth, Texas	1	28	Defeated Gino Hernandez who substituted for an absent Adams.	
—	Vacated	February 4, 1985	—	—	—	—	Haynes left WCCW and vacated the title after (in storyline) being attacked and injured by Oliver on February 4th in Ft. Worth. The footage and announcement of Haynes' injury aired on February 16, 1985.	
38	Rip Oliver	February 4, 1985	WCCW show	Ft. Worth, Texas	1	49	Defeated Buck Zumhofe.	
—	Vacated	March 25, 1985	—	—	—	—	Rip Oliver was suspended for attacking Mike Von Erich and he was stripped of the championship.	
39	Scott Casey	April 1, 1985	WCCW show	Ft. Worth, Texas	1	70	Defeated Dennis Condrey.	
40	Killer Tim Brooks	June 10, 1985	WCCW show	Ft. Worth, Texas	1	35		
41	Iceman Parsons	July 15, 1985	WCCW show	Ft. Worth, Texas	3	21		
—	Vacated	August 5, 1985	—	—	—	—	Parsons no-showed a title match against John Tatum.	
42	John Tatum	August 5, 1985	WCCW show	Ft. Worth, Texas	1	77	Defeated Shawn Cody to win the vacant championship	
43	Iceman Parsons	October 21, 1985	WCCW show	Ft. Worth, Texas	4	(Note: The exact date on which Iceman Parsons vacated the title is unknown, which means the title reign lasted between 11 and 40 days.)		
—	Vacated	November 1985	—	—	—	—	Parsons was injured by Rick Rude and could not compete.	
44	Dave Peterson	December 2, 1985	WCCW show	Ft. Worth, Texas	1	7	Defeated The Grappler.	
45	Jack Victory	December 9, 1985	WCCW show	Ft. Worth, Texas	1	14		
46	Mark Youngblood	December 23, 1985	WCCW show	Ft. Worth, Texas	1	14		
47	Buddy Roberts	January 6, 1986	WCCW show	Ft. Worth, Texas	1	77		
WCWA Television Championship
48	Lance Von Erich	March 24, 1986	WCWA show	Ft. Worth, Texas	1	52		
49	Rick Rude	May 5, 1986	WCWA show	Ft. Worth, Texas	1	12		
50	Bruiser Brody	May 17, 1986	WCWA show	Ft. Worth, Texas	1	(Note: The exact date on which Bruiser Brody gave up the title is unknown, which means the title reign lasted between 15 and 30 days.)	Won the championship by disqualification.	
51	Chris Adams	June 1986	WCWA show	Texas	4	(Note: The exact date on which Chris Adams was given the title is unknown, which means the title reign lasted between 0 and 161 days.)	Was given the title by an injured Bruiser Brody.	
52	Buzz Sawyer	June 16, 1986	WCWA show	Ft. Worth, Texas	1	56		
53	Steve Simpson	August 11, 1986	WCWA show	Ft. Worth, Texas	1	70		
54	Crusher Yurkof	October 20, 1986	WCWA show	Ft. Worth, Texas	1	42		
55	Tony Atlas	December 1, 1986	WCWA show	Ft. Worth, Texas	1	(Note: The exact date on which WCCW abandoned the title is unknown, which means the title reign lasted between 121 and 150 days.)	Won the match and the championship by disqualification.	
—	Deactivated	April 1987	—	—	—	—	Tony Atlas left WCCW and the championship was abandoned.	

== Combined length ==
Key
¤	The exact length of at least one title reign is uncertain, so the shortest possible length is used.

Rank	Wrestler	No. of reigns	Combined days
1	Bill Irwin	7	464¤
2	Chris Adams	4	295¤
3	José Lothario	2	183
4	The Spoiler	3	170
5	Brian Adias	3	164
6	Tony Atlas	1	121¤
7	Iceman Parsons	4	109¤
8	Bruiser Brody	2	92¤
9	Buddy Roberts	1	77
9	John Tatum	1	77
9	Kelly Kiniski	1	77
12	Scott Casey	1	70
13	Steve Simpson	1	70
13	Al Madril	1	63
15	Buzz Sawyer	1	56
16	Lance Von Erich	1	52
17	Rip Oliver	1	49
17	N'Tola Yatsu	1	49
19	The Mongol	1	42
20	Killer Tim Brooks	1	35
20	The Great Kabuki	1	35
20	The Super Destroyer	2	35
23	Billy Haynes	1	28
24	Johnny Mantell	1	28
25	Frank Dusek	2	27¤
26	Bugsy McGraw	1	26¤
27	Jake Roberts	1	21
28	Jack Victory	1	14
28	Killer Khan	1	14
28	Mark Youngblood	1	14
31	Rick Rude	1	12
32	Dave Peterson	1	7
32	Jimmy Garvin	1	7
34	Checkmate	1	1¤
35	Kevin Von Erich	1	0

== See also ==
- World Class Championship Wrestling
