= 4th Von Erich Memorial Parade of Champions =

- Promotion: World Class Wrestling Association
- Date: May 3, 1987
- City: Irving, Texas
- Venue: Texas Stadium
- Attendance: 5,900

Event chronology
← Previous; Wrestling Star Wars	Next → Labor Day Star Wars

Parade of Champions chronology
← Previous; 1986	Next → 1988

The 4th Von Erich Memorial Parade of Champions was a major professional wrestling supercard event produced by World Championship Wrestling Association (WCWA) on May 3, 1987 at the Texas Stadium in Irving, Texas. The event was held by WCCW promoter Fritz Von Erich in memory of his sons David Von Erich and Mike Von Erich, who died in February 1984 via a drug overdose, and April 1987 via suicide respectively.

Eleven professional wrestling matches were contested at the event. The main event was a six-woman Mud Pit match, won by Candi Divine. However, it was not included in the video. The televised main event saw Bruiser Brody defeat Jeep Swenson. In other prominent matches on the card, The Fantastics (Bobby Fulton and Tommy Rogers) and Steve Simpson defeated the Rock 'n' Roll RPMs (Mike Davis and Tommy Lane) and Eric Embry in a scaffold match and Kevin Von Erich retained the WCWA World Heavyweight Championship against Nord the Barbarian via a double count-out.

This event won the 1987 award for Most Disgusting Promotional Tactic from the Wrestling Observer Newsletter; the combination of Mike Von Erich's name attached to the event (his suicide had been less than a month before it) and use of stipulations such as a scaffold match and women's mud wrestling was seen as exploitative.

== Event ==
=== Preliminary matches ===
The event opened with a tag team match pitting Matt Borne and Scott Casey against Black Bart and Jack Victory. Borne pinned Bart following a powerslam for the win.

Next, Steve Doll took on Killer Tim Brooks. Doll hit a series of moves including a powerslam to Brooks before pinning him with a small package for the win.

It was followed by a match between Cousin Junior and The Grappler. Junior delivered a diving splash to Grappler for the win.

Next, Red River Jack and Spike Huber took on Abdullah the Butcher and Eli the Eliminator in a tag team match. The match stipulated that if Jack and Huber won, Jack would get a singles match against Butcher and Eliminator's manager Gary Hart. However, if Butcher and Eliminator won, Jack would be forced to unmask. Huber pinned Eli, which meant that Jack would get five minutes in the ring with Hart. As a result, Jack faced Hart in an immediate match. Hart retreated from the ring and ran away and Jack won by count-out.

In the following match, Mil Máscaras took on Al Madril. Mascaras delivered a diving crossbody to Madril for the win.

It was followed by a lumberjack match between Skip Young and Brian Adias. The match was not televised. Young won the match.

Next, Kevin Von Erich defended the World Heavyweight Championship against Nord the Barbarian in the only championship match of the event. The match spilled to the outside of the ring and both men got counted out. As a result, Von Erich retained the title. Both wrestlers continued to brawl around the ringside area.

It was followed by a scaffold match, in which The Fantastics (Bobby Fulton and Tommy Rogers) and Steve Simpson took on the Rock 'n' Roll RPMs (Mike Davis and Tommy Lane) and Eric Embry. Fantastics and Simpson won the match when Embry was thrown off the scaffold into the ring.

=== Main event matches ===
The televised main event was a match between Bruiser Brody and Jeep Swenson. Brody pinned Swenson after hitting him with a chair for the win.

It was followed by a non-televised six-woman Mud Pit match, where the winner would receive $10,000. Candi Divine won the match.

== Reception ==
Parade of Champions was a failure as compared to the original three shows. It had the lowest attendance in Parade of Champions events at 5,900 with a ticket revenue of $71,000.

Critics panned the event, considering it an indication of the WCWA's downfall and eventual demise. Arnold Furious felt that all the major draws of the promotion had either left or died, stating "David’s (Von Erich) dead. Mike’s (Von Erich) dead. Gino’s (Hernandez) dead. Chris Adams and the (Fabulous) Freebirds left town. Kerry (Von Erich) lost his foot. It’s over Fritz (Von Erich)."

Dave Meltzer of Wrestling Observer Newsletter criticized the exploitation of Mike Von Erich's recent death to boost ticket sales as the Most Disgusting Promotional Tactic.

== Aftermath ==
Some rivalries continued for a while after Parade of Champions. One such was between The Fantastics and Rock 'n' Roll RPMs. Both teams competed for the vacant WCWA World Tag Team Championship on May 4. Fantastics won the vacant titles and defeated Rock 'n' Roll RPMs in a rematch to retain the titles on May 15. Rock 'n' Roll RPMs teamed with Eric Embry to take on Fantastics and their new partner Matt Borne in six-man tag team matches on May 25 and June 1. Fantastics and Borne won on both occasions. Fantastics again came out on top against Embry and RPMs on June 5, when the pairing of Fantastics, Al Madril, and Dingo Warrior defeated Embry, RPMs, and Brian Adias in an eight-man tag team match. Embry would go on to form a team with Frankie Lancaster and the new team eventually defeated Fantastics to win the World Tag Team Championship on June 26.

Steve Simpson also continued his feud with Eric Embry as the two wrestled in a match on May 6, but the match ended in a time limit draw. They competed in a series of tag team matches on opposing teams until Steve's brother Shaun Simpson made his debut and the two brothers formed a tag team. Simpson Brothers eventually defeated Embry and Frankie Lancaster to win the World Tag Team Championship at Labor Day Star Wars.

Other wrestlers moved on with new rivalries such as Kevin Von Erich, who engaged in a rivalry with Al Perez and traded the World Heavyweight Championship with Perez during the fall of 1987.

== Results ==
No.	Results	Stipulations	Times
1	Matt Borne and Scott Casey defeated Black Bart and Jack Victory (with Percy Pringle III)	Tag team match	7:01
2	Steve Doll defeated Killer Tim Brooks	Singles match	7:38
3	Cousin Junior defeated The Grappler	Singles match	4:46
4	Red River Jack and Spike Huber defeated Abdullah the Butcher and Eli the Eliminator (with Gary Hart)	Tag team match	6:27
5	Red River Jack defeated Gary Hart by count-out	Singles match	2:15
6	Mil Máscaras defeated Al Madril	Singles match	10:27
7^{D}	Skip Young defeated Brian Adias	Lumberjack match	—
8	Kevin Von Erich (c) vs. Nord the Barbarian ended in a double countout	Singles match for the WCWA World Heavyweight Championship	5:11
9	The Fantastics (Bobby Fulton and Tommy Rogers) and Steve Simpson defeated the Rock 'n' Roll RPMs (Mike Davis and Tommy Lane) and Eric Embry	Scaffold match	5:23
10	Bruiser Brody defeated Jeep Swenson	Singles match	5:25
11^{D}	Candi Divine defeated five other wrestlers	Six-woman Mud Pit match	—
(c) / – the champion(s) heading into the match; D / – this was a dark match

== See also ==
- 1987 in professional wrestling
