= Tony Charles =

British professional wrestler (1935–2015)

Personal information
- Born: Anthony Charles Scott; July 15, 1935 Treorchy, Wales
- Died: 13 February 2015 (aged 79) Gulf Breeze, Florida, United States

Professional wrestling career
- Ring name(s): Tony Charles; Checkmate
- Billed height: 5 ft 10 in (178 cm)
- Billed weight: 220 lb (100 kg)
- Debut: 1959
- Retired: 1984

Anthony Charles Scott (July 15, 1935 – February 13, 2015) was a Welsh professional wrestler who wrestled under the ring name Tony Charles who worked in England, Japan, and the National Wrestling Alliance in the United States. Also wrestled as The Checkmate in Texas for World Class Championship Wrestling.

== Career ==
Charles started his professional wrestling career in 1959 in England for Joint Promotions. During the early 1960s, Charles worked both in England and France.

In February 1968, Charles made his debut in Japan for International Wrestling Enterprise. In 1970, Charles worked in Mexico and Germany in 1971.

In 1972, Charles left the United Kingdom and went to North America for NWA Mid-America. A year later in 1973, Charles worked in Florida where he spent a few years there. Also that same year he returned to Japan working for New Japan Pro Wrestling.

In 1977, Charles went to Tennessee to work for Continental Wrestling Federation where he became a household name. In 1979, Charles made his debut for Continental Wrestling Association also based in Tennessee. He became a three-time Southeast United States Junior Heavyweight Championship in Tennessee from 1979 to 1982.

In 1981, Charles wrestled for Mid-South Wrestling.

In 1982, Charles went to Texas for World Class Championship Wrestling wearing a mask as The Checkmate. The reason he used the gimmick was because wrestling is like a game of human chess. He won the WCWA Television Championship on October 4, 1982, defeating Bill Irwin. He dropped the title to Frank Dusek. Checkmate left World Class in 1983.

During the later part of his career, Charles went back to Florida and retired in 1984.

Charles died on February 13, 2015, after years of Alzheimer's at 79.

== Championships and accomplishments ==
- Continental Championship Wrestling
  - Southeast United States Junior Heavyweight Championship (3 times)
- Georgia Championship Wrestling
  - NWA Georgia Tag Team Championship (1 time) - with Les Thornton
- National Wrestling Alliance
  - NWA Mid-America Tag Team Championship (3 times) – with Len Rossi (2)
- Southeastern Championship Wrestling
  - NWA Southeastern Tag Team Championship (1 time) – with Ronnie Garvin (1)
- NWA Big Time Wrestling
  - NWA Texas Tag Team Championship (1 time) - with Tony Charles
  - WCWA Television Championship (1 time)
