= AWA World Light Heavyweight Championship =

Professional wrestling championship

Details
- Promotion: American Wrestling Association
- Date established: May 1981
- Date retired: August 1991
Statistics
- First champion: Mike Graham
- Most reigns: Buck Zumhofe (4 reigns)
- Longest reign: Mike Graham (735 days)
- Shortest reign: Jonnie Stewart (60 days)

The AWA World Light Heavyweight Championship was a title in the American Wrestling Association (AWA) from 1981 until it closed in 1991.

== Title history ==
Key
No.	Overall reign number
Reign	Reign number for the specific champion
Days	Number of days held

No.	Champion	Championship change			Reign statistics		Notes	Ref.
No.	Champion	Date	Event	Location	Reign	Days	Notes	Ref.
American Wrestling Association (AWA)
1	Mike Graham	June 14, 1981	House show	Green Bay, Wisconsin	1	735	Won a tournament final.	
2	Buck Zumhofe	June 19, 1983	House show	Hamburg, Minnesota	1	280		
3	Steve Regal	March 25, 1984	House show	Saint Paul, Minnesota	1	613		
4	Buck Zumhofe	November 28, 1985	House show	Saint Paul, Minnesota	2	212		
—	Vacated	June 28, 1986	—	—	—	—	Zumhofe is sent to prison	
Championship history is unrecorded from July 1986 to November 1988.
5	Mike Graham	December 13, 1988	House show	Chicago, Illinois	2	(Note: The length Graham's reign has not been verified by documentation, making the length of the actual reign too uncertain to calculate.)	Records are unclear on how Graham won the championship.	
Championship history is unrecorded from January 1989 to July 1990.
6	Buck Zumhofe	August 11, 1990	House show	Rochester, Minnesota	3	63	Records are unclear on how Zumhofe won the championship.	
7	Jonnie Stewart	October 13, 1990	House show	N/A	1	60		
8	Buck Zumhofe	December 12, 1990	House show	Rochester, Minnesota	4	(Note: The exact date the AWA stops promoting on a regular basis is unknown making the length of the reign too uncertain to calculate.)		
Championship history is unrecorded from January 1991 to August 1991.
—	Deactivated	August 1991	—	—	—	—		

== FMW version ==
In 1989, the Japan-based Frontier Martial-Arts Wrestling (FMW) began billing Florida Championship Wrestling/Professional Wrestling Federation champion Jim Backlund as the AWA champion. This was never sanctioned by the AWA. FMW's claimed title became FMW's lower weight division title. In 1992, FMW renamed the title to the WWA World Martial Arts Junior Heavyweight Championship before retiring it in 1993.

Key
No.	Overall reign number
Reign	Reign number for the specific champion
Days	Number of days held

No.	Champion	Championship change			Reign statistics		Notes	Ref.
No.	Champion	Date	Event	Location	Reign	Days	Notes	Ref.
Frontier Martial-Arts Wrestling (FMW)
1 (6)	Jim Backlund	December 10, 1988	House show	Tampa, Florida	1	477	Backlund defeated Tyree Pride for the FCW Light Heavyweight Championship; because of this victory Backlund is recognized as the sixth AWA champion by FMW in Japan during 1989 but not by the AWA itself.	
2 (7)	Lee Gak-soo	April 1, 1990	House show	Tokyo, Japan	1	(Note: The exact date the championship was vacated which means that the reign lasted between 518 and 542 days.)		
—	Vacated	August 1990	—	—	—	—	Title vacated after Lee left FMW.	
3 (8)	Katsuji Ueda	September 25, 1990	Battle Field	Nagoya, Japan	1	41	Defeated Jim Backlund in a "Different Style Match" tournament final.	
4 (9)	Jim Backlund	November 5, 1990	FMW 1st Anniversary Show	Tokyo, Japan	2	205		
5 (10)	Ricky Fuji	May 29, 1991	House show	Tokyo, Japan	1	87		
6 (11)	Mark Starr	August 24, 1991	House show	Tokyo, Japan	1	7		
7 (12)	Katsuji Ueda	August 31, 1991	House show	Chiba, Japan	2	205		
8 (13)	Dr. Luther	March 23, 1992	House show	Saitama, Japan	1	197	The title is renamed to the WWA World Martial Arts Junior Heavyweight Championship in April 1992.	
9 (14)	Katsuji Ueda	September 7, 1992	House show	Saitama, Japan	3	(Note: The date the title is abandoned is not documented making the championship reign too uncertain to calculate.)		
—	Deactivated	September 1993	—	—	—	—	The title is retired and replaced with the Independent World Junior Heavyweight Championship.	

== See also ==
- Independent World Junior Heavyweight Championship
- WSL World Light Heavyweight Championship
