= King Parsons =

American professional wrestler (born 1950)

- Parsons performing a dance as part of his ring entrance, c. 1985

Personal information
- Born: King Bailey Parsons Jr. June 11, 1950 (age 76)

Professional wrestling career
- Ring name(s): Iceman Parsons; King Parsons; Blackbird
- Billed height: 5 ft 10 in (1.78 m)
- Billed weight: 245 lb (111 kg; 17.5 st)
- Billed from: St. Louis, Missouri
- Trained by: Nick Kozak
- Debut: 1979
- Retired: 2005

King Bailey Parsons Jr. (born June 11, 1950) is an American former professional wrestler better known by his ring name Iceman King Parsons.

== Professional wrestling career ==
Parsons performing a backdrop on Rip Oliver

Parsons started wrestling in 1979 after being trained by Nick Kozak. King started for the National Wrestling Alliance (NWA)'s Paul Boesch Promotion in Houston, Texas. Boesch contacted Don Owen and was successful in landing a job for King in the NWA's Pacific Northwest territory. Both Don and Elton Owen promoted in Washington and Oregon. While in the promotion, he teamed with Rocky Johnson and won the tag team title. King moved to Barling, Arkansas and lived there while working for the Tulsa promotion and Leroy McGuirk circa 1978–79. King moved to Worland, Wyoming and wrestled for the Rocky Mountain Wrestling promotion for about a year, wrestling in Wyoming, Idaho, and Utah. Bill Ash booked all the talent and the matches.

In 1982, he moved on to Jim Crockett Promotions where he teamed with Porkchop Cash and feuded with Don Kernodle and Jim Nelson over the NWA Mid-Atlantic Tag Team Championship. In 1983, King then moved on to World Class Championship Wrestling. He feuded with the One Man Gang and Chris Adams. Parsons feuded with Freebird Buddy Roberts who cut his hair. They ended the feud late June 1983 with Parsons using the Freebird hair cream to render Roberts bald. In early December, 1983, Parsons was kayfabe burnt by Skandor Akbar's flame thrower in a match between him and Junkyard Dog vs. Super Destroyer #1 & Super Destroyer #2, leaving Parsons with a kayfabe disfigurement. Teaming with Brian Adias against the Super Destroyers at WCCW Wrestling Star Wars in December 1983, Parsons would almost win the NWA American Tag Team Championship, but with the Super Destroyers throwing Adias over the top rope, The Super Destroyers would retain the belts. In addition to his wrestling ability, Parsons became known as one of the best microphone workers in the industry, using many catch phrases such as "rooty poot," "Hubba Bubba, not a speck of trubba," and "Like Momma says, it be's that way sometimes -- have mercy!"

In 1984 Parsons formed "Rock 'n' Soul" with Buck Zumhofe and they, too, had a big feud with The Super Destroyers. He wrestled briefly in the Texas All-Star Wrestling promotion in 1986 and formed the "Dream Team" with Tiger Conway Jr. They feuded with Mike and Dizzy Golden.

Iceman then went on to the Universal Wrestling Federation, where he was snubbed out of a tag team title tournament in 1987. Parsons turned heel and feuded mostly with Adams and with Savannah Jack for many months, and his feud with Jack carried over to Ken Mantell's new Wild West Wrestling promotion. In late 1987, he joined Terry Gordy and Buddy Roberts, after Michael Hayes left the Fabulous Freebirds, to help them get revenge on him. Hayes teamed with Kerry and Kevin Von Erich and they had a long feud that eventually saw Gordy side with Hayes and the Von Erichs and Roberts leave the promotion. Parsons was known as the "Blackbird" during this feud and formed a trio called "The Blackbirds" with Perry "Action" Jackson and Harold T. Harris. In 1985, Parsons would win the WCWA American Heavyweight Championship defeating Chris Adams, later losing that title to "Ravishing" Rick Rude. In March 1988 Parsons defeated Kerry Von Erich for the World Class Heavyweight Championship in a highly controversial bout that actually saw the lights go out in the Dallas Sportatorium.

In the early-1990s, he moved over to the Herb Abrams-owned Universal Wrestling Federation and feuded with Colonel DeBeers over his treatment of African-American referee Larry Sampson, who was Parsons's storyline cousin. In 1992, Parsons went to the Global Wrestling Federation with Jackson as the Blackbirds managed by Baboose The Witch Doctor and won the tag team title. Parsons also won the North American title, which was their top title. Parsons and Jackson feuded with The Ebony Experience. He also worked for the United States Wrestling Association where he was managed by Skandor Akbar and Percy Pringle.

After the death of friend Chris Adams in 2001 and suffering a serious back injury from a car accident, Parsons cut back on his appearances. He is semi-retired, appearing from time to time with a few independent promotions in Texas.

On September 1, 2018 Parsons teamed with Marshall and Ross Von Erich defeating Tatanka, Kid Kash and Arrow Club Kyote at World Class Revolution.

== Championships and accomplishments ==
- Big D Wrestling
  - Big D Tag Team Championship (2 times) – with Action Jackson
- Continental Wrestling Alliance
  - CWA Heavyweight Championship (1 time)
- Extreme Pro Wrestling
  - EPW Texas Heavyweight Championship (1 time)
- Global Wrestling Federation
  - GWF North American Heavyweight Championship (1 time)
  - GWF Tag Team Championship (1 time) – with Perry Jackson
- Mid-Atlantic Championship Wrestling
  - NWA Mid-Atlantic Tag Team Championship (1 time) – with Porkchop Cash
- National Class Wrestling
  - NCW Heavyweight Championship (1 time)
- North American Wrestling Alliance
  - NAWA Heavyweight Championship (1 time)
- Pacific Northwest Wrestling
  - NWA Pacific Northwest Tag Team Championship (1 time) – with Rocky Johnson
- Pro Wrestling Illustrated
  - PWI ranked him # 69 of the 500 best singles wrestlers during the "PWI 500" in 1991
  - PWI ranked him # 249 of the 500 best singles wrestlers during the "PWI Years" in 2003
- Texas All-Star Wrestling
  - Texas All-Star USA Tag Team Championship (2 times) – with Tiger Conway Jr.
- Texas Wrestling Federation
  - TWF Asian Heavyweight Championship (1 time)
- Ultimate Wrestling Federation
  - UWF Heavyweight Championship (1 time)
- World Class Championship Wrestling / World Class Wrestling Association
  - NWA American Heavyweight Championship (1 time)
  - NWA American Tag Team Championship (3 times) – with Brian Adias (1) and Buck Zumhofe (2)
  - WCCW Television Championship (4 times)
  - WCWA Texas Heavyweight Championship (1 time)
  - WCWA World Heavyweight Championship (1 time)
  - WCWA World Six-Man Tag Team Championship (1 time) – with Terry Gordy and Buddy Roberts
  - WCWA World Tag Team Championship (1 time) – with Terry Taylor
- World Wrestling Alliance
  - WWA Heavyweight Championship (1 time)
