= Killer Khan =

Japanese professional wrestler (1947–2023)

- Khan in 1981

Personal information
- Born: Masashi Ozawa; March 6, 1947 Tsubame, Niigata, Japan
- Died: December 29, 2023 (aged 76) Tokyo, Japan
- Spouse: Cindy Ozawa (m. 1975)
- Children: 3

Professional wrestling career
- Ring name(s): Killer Khan; Temjin El Mongol; Masashi Ozawa
- Billed height: 1.95 m (6 ft 5 in)
- Billed weight: 141 kg (311 lb)
- Billed from: Mongolia
- Debut: November 20, 1971
- Retired: November 29, 1987

Masashi Ozawa (小沢 正志, Ozawa Masashi; March 6, 1947 – December 29, 2023) was a Japanese professional wrestler. Popularly known as Killer Khan, he was billed from Mongolia and had numerous high-profile matches with André the Giant in the World Wrestling Federation (WWF) during the 1980s, including a high-profile "Mongolian stretcher match". Khan used Asian mist against opponents.

== Professional wrestling career ==
From 1963 until 1970 he was a sumo wrestler with the Kasugano stable, reaching a highest rank of makushita 40. His fighting name was Koshinishiki. Ozawa started wrestling under his true name in 1971 in Japan. In 1977 he wrestled in the Toronto area as Kim Chang and then returned to Japan. Ozawa's Mongolian giant character was created by Karl Gotch. He traveled to the U.S. in 1979 to wrestle. The following year, in 1980, Khan first wrestled André the Giant in a tag team match for Georgia Championship Wrestling. Later that same year, he was hired by the World Wrestling Federation (WWF). In the WWF, Khan originally feuded with WWF Champion Bob Backlund, as well as the WWF Intercontinental Champion Pedro Morales.

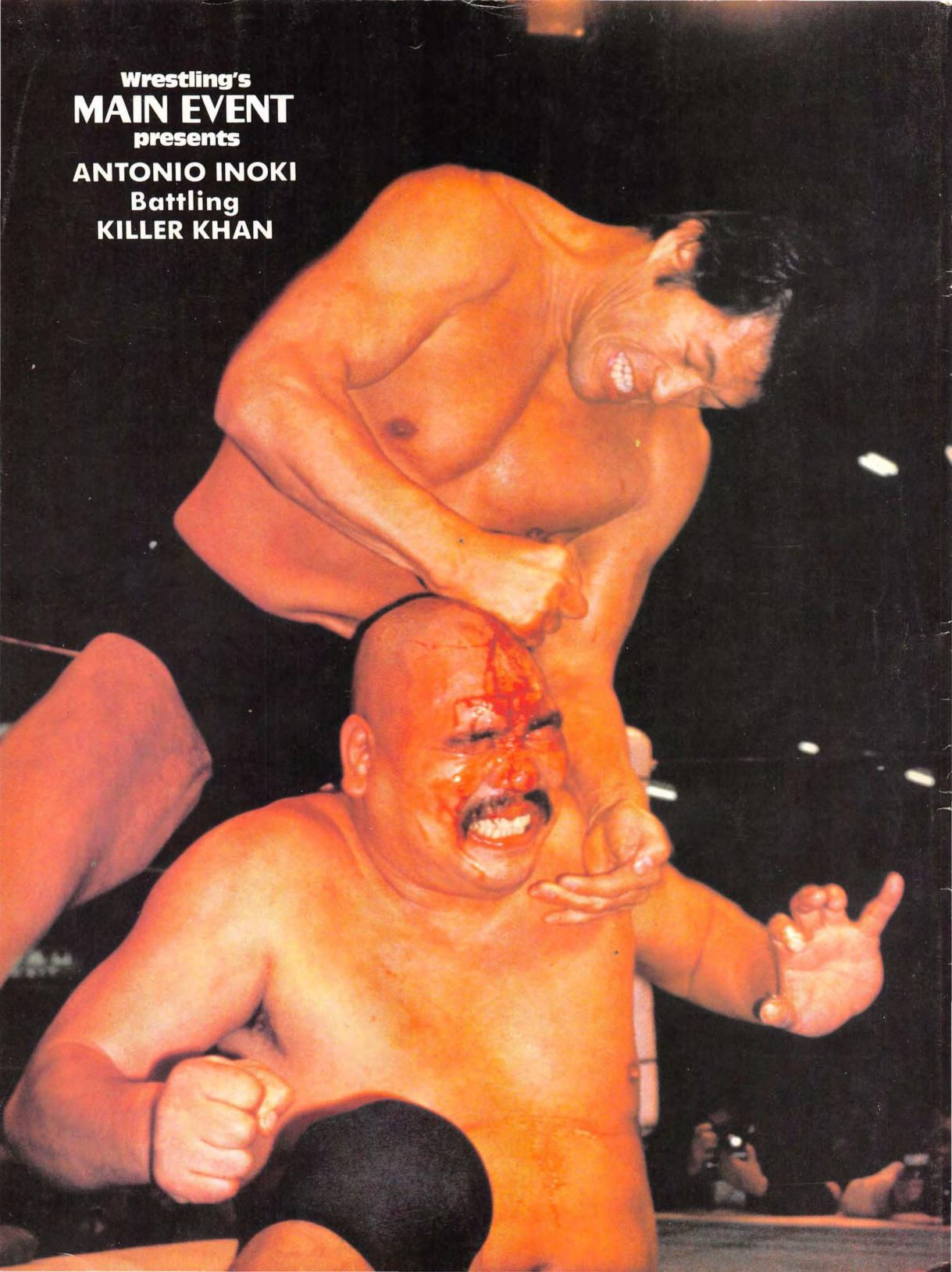
Antonio Inoki (top) hitting Khan (bottom) during a match in 1982

Khan was then placed in feud with André the Giant. During one match in May 1981, a kayfabe Khan kneedrop off the top turnbuckle resulted in André the Giant breaking his ankle, as Khan accidentally landed on it. The truth was that Andre actually broke his ankle getting out of bed. The incident had been reported as real and as a storyline to help put Khan over. When Andre returned from his injury, he and Khan feuded into the next year. In November 1981 in Philadelphia, Andre defeated Khan in a "Mongolian Stretcher match." The feud was named Wrestling Observer Newsletter's Feud of the Year.

In 1984 in Canada's Stampede Wrestling, he had a series of matches with Archie "The Stomper" Gouldie. On January 20, 1984, he won the Stampede North American Heavyweight Championship from Gouldie in a street fight. In March, he lost the title to Dynamite Kid. He also had successful runs as a monster heel in Mid-South Wrestling and NWA World Class Championship Wrestling. Usually managed by Skandor Akbar, the WCCW run saw him team with the Freebirds (teaching Terry Gordy the Oriental Spike), then turning on him, paid by Akbar.

Khan made a brief return to the WWF in 1987, managed by Mr. Fuji, where he feuded with Outback Jack and had a brief house show run challenging WWF Champion Hulk Hogan. He retired from wrestling later that year. Bruce Prichard explained on his podcast "Something to Wrestle" that Khan was homesick and missed his family. He did not like the road schedule of the WWF.

== Personal life ==
After retiring from wrestling, Khan ran numerous restaurants and bars in Tokyo.

Khan had a role as a bodyguard in the movie 3 Ninjas Kick Back, and a cameo in 2006 Japanese special effects action series Lion-Maru G. Khan owned a restaurant in Tokyo, Japan, before his death. He was married to Cindy Ozawa of Lutz, Florida, though the two lived on separate continents. He had three children: Yukie, Yoshiko, and David Masato. All of them reside in the United States.

On December 9, 2020, around 5:00 PM, Khan was involved in a hit and run in his hometown of Tokyo, Japan. According to authorities in the Shinjuku Ward, he allegedly struck a woman who was riding a bike in the Hyakunincho area, then fled the scene. The woman suffered a broken tooth in the accident and sustained other injuries that took about a month to heal. Khan later apologized for the incident and stated that he was in a hurry to get to his restaurant. He was not charged nor prosecuted.

== Death ==
Khan died from an aortic dissection on December 29, 2023, at the age of 76. According to a statement released by New Japan Pro-Wrestling, Khan died after collapsing at one of his bars in Tokyo.

== Championships and accomplishments ==
- Championship Wrestling from Florida
  - NWA United States Tag Team Championship (Florida version) (1 time) - with Pak Song
  - NWA United States Tag Team Championship Tournament (1979) - with Pak Song
- Mid-South Wrestling Association
  - Mid-South Louisiana Championship (1 time)
  - Mid-South Mississippi Heavyweight Championship (1 time)
  - Mid-South Louisiana Championship Tournament (1982)
- Stampede Wrestling
  - Stampede North American Heavyweight Championship (1 time)
- World Class Championship Wrestling
  - WCCW Television Championship (1 time)
- Pro Wrestling Illustrated
  - PWI Feud of the Year (1981) vs. André the Giant
  - PWI Match of the Year (1981) vs. André the Giant on May 2
  - PWI ranked him # 176 of the 500 best singles wrestlers during the PWI Years in 2003.
- Wrestling Observer Newsletter
  - Feud of the Year (1981) vs. André the Giant
