= Rick Rude =

American professional wrestler (1958–1999)

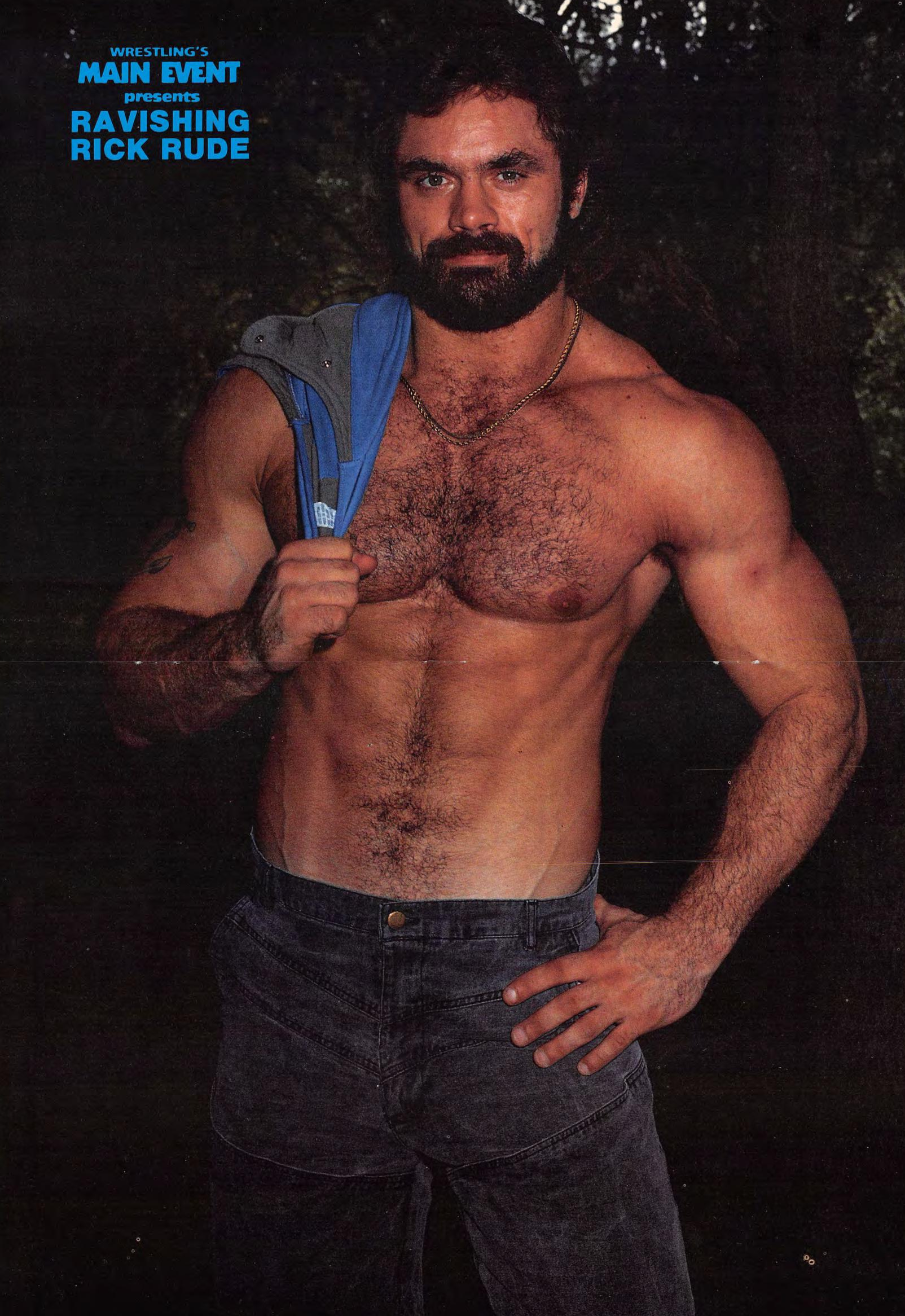
- Rude, c. 1988

Personal information
- Born: Richard Erwin Rood; December 7, 1958 St. Peter, Minnesota, U.S.
- Died: April 20, 1999 (aged 40) Alpharetta, Georgia, U.S.
- Cause of death: Accidental overdose
- Education: Anoka-Ramsey Community College
- Spouses: Cheryl Holler (m. 1980; div. 1982) Michelle Rood (m. 1988)
- Children: 3

Professional wrestling career
- Ring name(s): Rick Rude; Ricky Rood; The WCW Phantom
- Billed height: 6 ft 3 in (191 cm)
- Billed weight: 252 lb (114 kg)
- Billed from: Robbinsdale, Minnesota
- Trained by: Eddie Sharkey
- Debut: 1982
- Retired: 1994

Signature
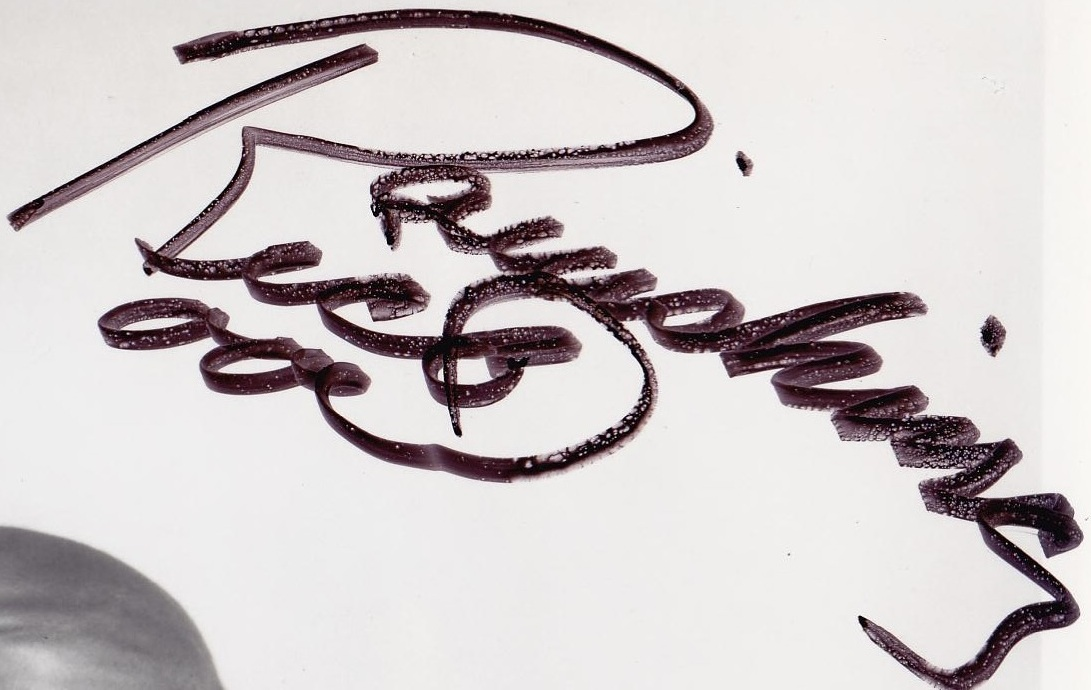

Richard Erwin Rood (December 7, 1958 – April 20, 1999), better known by his ring name "Ravishing" Rick Rude, was an American professional wrestler who performed for various professional wrestling promotions, including the World Wrestling Federation (WWF), World Championship Wrestling (WCW), and Extreme Championship Wrestling (ECW).

Rude wrestled from 1982 until his 1994 retirement due to injury, with a final match following in 1997. Among other accolades, he was a four-time world champion, a three-time WCW International World Heavyweight Champion, a one-time WCWA World Heavyweight Champion, a one-time WWF Intercontinental Heavyweight Champion, and a one-time WCW United States Heavyweight Champion. Rude also challenged for the WWF World Heavyweight Championship and the NWA World Heavyweight Championship on pay-per-view cards, competing for the former in the main event of SummerSlam 1990. Following his retirement, Rude managed multiple wrestlers.

In late 1997, Rude founded the D-Generation X stable alongside Shawn Michaels, Triple H, and Chyna. On November 17 of that year, in the midst of the Monday Night War, he became the only person to appear on the WWF's Raw and WCW's Monday Nitro programs on the same night, as the former was pre-recorded and Rude had left for WCW in the interim. He was posthumously inducted into the WWE Hall of Fame in 2017.

== Early life ==
Rude was born in St. Peter, Minnesota to Richard Clyde Rood and Sally Jean Thompson. He attended Robbinsdale High School in Robbinsdale, Minnesota with Tom Zenk, Brady Boone, Nikita Koloff, Curt Hennig, John Nord, and Barry Darsow, all of whom later became professional wrestlers. He was especially close with his childhood friend Curt Hennig.

== Professional wrestling career ==
=== Early career (1982–1984) ===
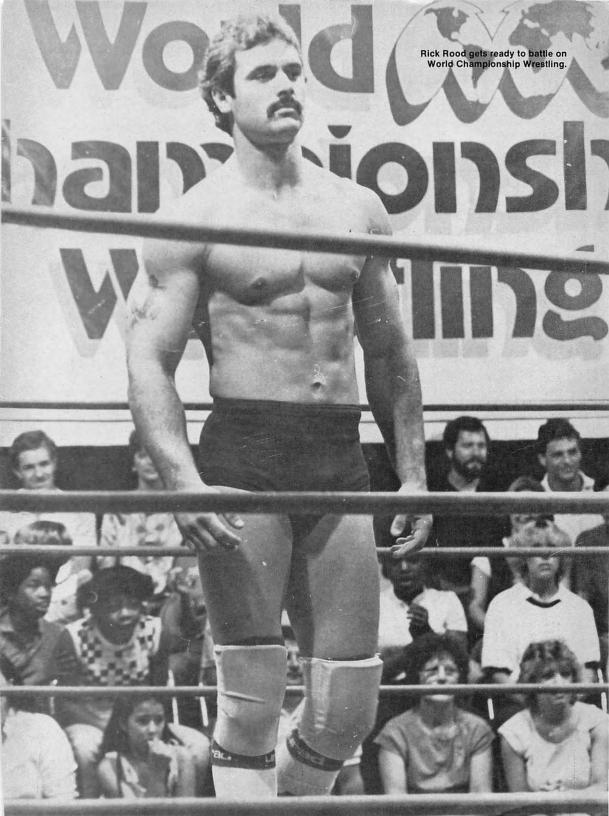
Rude in World Championship Wrestling, circa 1983

After graduating from Anoka-Ramsey Community College with a degree in physical education, Rude worked as a bouncer for a short period and later did a small stint as an arm wrestler. He would first become known to the world of professional wrestling at that time. Rude trained as a wrestler under Eddie Sharkey, the same trainer responsible for training other wrestling stars like Bob Backlund, the Road Warriors, Sean Waltman, Austin Aries, and Erick Rowan. He began wrestling in 1982 as Ricky Rood, a babyface jobber.

Rude lost his television debut against Jos LeDuc on the November 6, 1982 episode of Mid-Atlantic Championship Wrestling. He started with Vancouver's NWA: All-Star Wrestling before moving on to compete for Georgia Championship Wrestling (GCW) and later the Memphis, Tennessee-based Continental Wrestling Association (CWA). Rude debuted on the May 28, 1983 episode of World Championship Wrestling, defeating Pat Rose with a dropkick. Gordon Solie interviewed Rude the following week, with Rude discussing transitioning from arm wrestling to pro wrestling and dropping weight to increase speed.

In 1984, he returned to Memphis, this time as "Ravishing" Rick Rude, an overconfident, arrogant heel managed by Jimmy Hart. Rude feuded with Jerry Lawler and later his former partner, King Kong Bundy. He later debuted in WCCW in a match against Kamala that he lost, and then went on to (NWA) affiliate Jim Crockett Promotions (JCP) where he and a variety of tag team partners feuded with The Road Warriors.

=== Championship Wrestling from Florida (1984–1985) ===
Rude was hired by Championship Wrestling from Florida (CWF) in December 1984, where he was managed by Percy Pringle. He defeated Mike Graham for the NWA Florida Southern Heavyweight Championship on January 16, 1985, and lost it to Brian Blair on April 10, 1985. He captured the championship again on July 20, 1985, when he defeated Graham in the finals of a Southern title tournament. He held the belt until October 1985, when he dropped it to Wahoo McDaniel, who was booking Florida during this time.

While teaming with Jesse Barr, Rude won the NWA Florida United States Tag Team Championship in April 1985, and feuded with Billy Jack Haynes and Wahoo McDaniel over the belts, losing the straps to McDaniel and Haynes in July 1985.

=== World Class Championship Wrestling / World Class Wrestling Association (1985–1986) ===
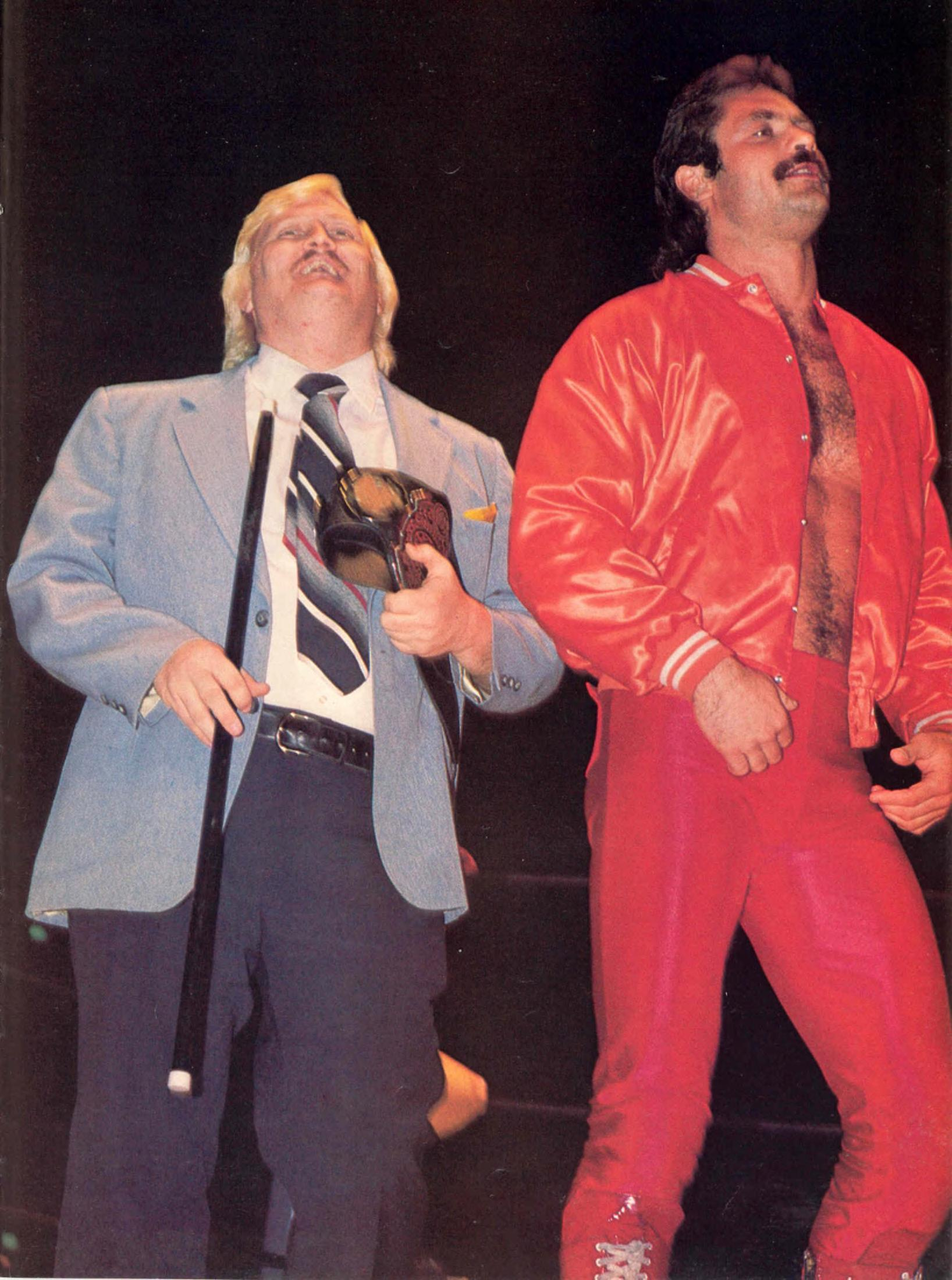
Rude (right) being managed by Percy Pringle in 1985

Debuting on October 18, 1985, Rude jumped to World Class Championship Wrestling (WCCW) along with Pringle, where he feuded with Kevin Von Erich and Chris Adams. During his time in WCCW, Rude captured the NWA American Heavyweight Championship on November 4, 1985. The WCCW withdrew from the NWA on February 20, 1986, and changed its name to the World Class Wrestling Association (WCWA). The NWA American Championship was renamed the WCWA World Heavyweight Championship while Rude was still holding the title. As a result, Rude became the promotion's first world champion. After losing the title to Chris Adams in July 1986, he fired Pringle and briefly replaced him with his sister, Raven. He formed a short-lived tag team with Dingo Warrior, but the Warrior turned on him and became a face.

=== Jim Crockett Promotions (1986–1987) ===
In September 1986, Rude returned to JCP and joined Manny Fernandez and his manager Paul Jones in their rivalry with Wahoo McDaniel. Rude and Fernandez, known collectively as the "Awesome Twosome", won the NWA World Tag Team Championship on December 6, 1986, from the Rock 'n' Roll Express, and they began a feud that ended only when Rude left the promotion for the World Wrestling Federation in April 1987. To explain the sudden departure, Jim Crockett Jr. aired a pre-taped non-title match where the Express defeated Rude and Fernandez and claimed that Rude had been injured as a result.

=== World Wrestling Federation (1987−1990) ===
==== Debut; feuds with Paul Orndorff and Jake Roberts (1987–1988) ====
Rude made his World Wrestling Federation (WWF) debut on Superstars of Wrestling on July 15, 1987, as the newest addition to the Heenan Family. His first major feud in the WWF was with Heenan's former musclebound charge "Mr. Wonderful" Paul Orndorff, whom Heenan had dropped after Rude joined the Family. Their feud culminated in Rude defeating Orndorff on November 24, at Madison Square Garden. He kickstarted 1988 by challenging Hulk Hogan for the WWF World Heavyweight Championship on January 9, at the Boston Garden but failed to win the title before starting one of his most famous feuds with Jake "The Snake" Roberts.

Rude had a routine where, before the match, he would make a show of removing his robe, likely inspired by Austin Idol's disrobing routine, while insulting the males in the crowd from their hometowns, usually calling them "fat, out-of-shape sweathogs". After his victories, he would kiss a woman whom Heenan selected from the audience. One of Rude's trademarks was his specially airbrushed tights that he wore during matches. In the Roberts angle, Rude tried to get Roberts' real-life wife, Cheryl, to participate, though not knowing when Heenan chose her that she was in fact Roberts' wife. After Mrs. Roberts rejected him and revealed who she was there to see, Rude became angry after she slapped him and according to Jake, busting his eardrum), grabbed her wrist, and berated her on the microphone when Roberts ran from the dressing room to make the save.

To retaliate a few days later, Rude came to the ring with a likeness of Cheryl stenciled on the front of his tights. A furious Roberts charged the ring and stripped Rude, appearing to television viewers to leave him naked, as indicated by black-spot censoring Rude's genital area, although the live audience saw him actually stripped to a g-string.

To mid-1988, Rude wore a second pair of tights under the one he wore to the ring, including during his match against the Junkyard Dog at the inaugural SummerSlam. During the match Rude had the JYD on his back and had climbed to the top turnbuckle. While up there he pulled down his tights to reveal a second with Cheryl Roberts printed on them. After hitting the Dog with a flying fist, he was attacked by Roberts who had seen the action from the dressing room. Roberts attack on Rude caused the JYD to be disqualified, giving Rude the win. Rude lost to Roberts in a "Rude Awakening vs. DDT" match on October 24, at Madison Square Garden. Rude's feud with Roberts came to its conclusion when Roberts pinned Rude following a DDT during the 1988 Survivor Series.

==== Intercontinental Champion; departure (1989–1990) ====
Rude's next big feud was with Ultimate Warrior and began in January at the 1989 Royal Rumble pay-per-view in a "Super Posedown" that ended with Rude attacking Warrior with a metal pose bar. With help from Heenan, Rude won the WWF Intercontinental Heavyweight Championship from Ultimate Warrior at WrestleMania V, before dropping it back to Warrior at SummerSlam that same year, due in large part to interference from "Rowdy" Roddy Piper.

Rude then feuded with Piper which led to a conflict between their respective teams at the 1989 Survivor Series in which both men brawled to a double count-out. Rude would go on to have many matches with Piper including inside a steel cage on December 28, at Madison Square Garden losing the majority of them, before having a brief program against Jimmy Snuka getting a win over him at WrestleMania VI.

Rude resumed his conflict with Ultimate Warrior in the summer of 1990 after Warrior had won the WWF Championship. Rude began rigorous training in preparation for the Warrior, and took a more serious approach by neglecting women and cutting his hair short, a style he maintained for the rest of his career. The feud culminated in a steel cage at SummerSlam 1990, wherein Rude was defeated by the Warrior.

Next, he was scheduled to feud with Big Boss Man, which had its start when Rude's manager Bobby Heenan started to make degrading comments about Boss Man's mother. Rude would later backup the statements and call out the Boss Man. Rude was scheduled to be a part of a team called the Natural Disasters at the Survivor Series, consisting of Earthquake, Dino Bravo, and The Barbarian against Hulk Hogan and Boss Man's team, but was replaced by Haku after being suspended indefinitely by Jack Tunney on an episode of Wrestling Challenge on October 28, 1990. Tunney explained that Rude's comments towards the Boss Man were the reason for his suspension and that his manager Bobby Heenan was obligated to wrestle the Boss Man in his place. In reality, Rude had a dispute with WWF owner Vince McMahon that led to him leaving the company.

=== Freelance (1991) ===
After leaving the WWF, Rude attempted to join Herb Abrams' UWF. Still under contract with the WWF, his former company sent a cease and desist order that prevented Rude from appearing on UWF television. He would not wrestle again until May 18, 1991, when he appeared at the TWA Spring Spectacular II event held by the Tri-State Wrestling Alliance in Philadelphia, PA. He faced Paul Orndorff and lost by disqualification.

In July 1991, Rude joined All Japan Pro Wrestling for their Summer Action Series 1991, making his initial appearance at a show in Yokosuka, Japan. In his first match on the tour, he teamed with Johnny Ace to defeat Billy Black and Joel Deaton. In singles matches Rude was undefeated, beating Isamu Teranishi and Akira Taue. His final appearance came on July 19, where he teamed with Johnny Ace in a losing effort to Dan Spivey and Stan Hansen.

Rude also appeared in International World Class Championship Wrestling (IWCCW), where he had confrontations with The Honky Tonk Man.

=== World Championship Wrestling (1991−1994) ===
==== Dangerous Alliance; United States Heavyweight Champion (1991–1993) ====
After spending a year wrestling on select shows on the independent circuit, and a July 1991 tour for All Japan Pro Wrestling (AJPW), Rude returned to WCW, which had originally been JCP prior to being sold to Ted Turner in late 1988. On October 27, 1991, he returned under a mask as the WCW Phantom at Halloween Havoc 1991, unmasking himself later that night. He led the Dangerous Alliance, consisting of himself, Paul E. Dangerously, Madusa, Arn Anderson, Bobby Eaton, Larry Zbyszko, and "Stunning" Steve Austin. On November 19, 1991, Rude defeated Sting for the WCW United States Heavyweight Championship and engaged in a number of high-profile feuds, including one with Ricky Steamboat. At one point during their feud, Steamboat suffered a kayfabe broken nose in a gang attack.

In 1992, Rude and Madusa left the Dangerous Alliance and feuded with Nikita Koloff. Rude challenged reigning World Heavyweight Champion Ron Simmons on several occasions but failed to win the title. In December 1992, Rude suffered a legitimate neck injury and was forced to forfeit the United States Championship, thus ending his reign of nearly 14 months, a reign that still stands today as the second longest reign in the almost 40-year history of the title.

in April 1993, Rude returned alone and tried to reclaim the title from Dustin Rhodes, who had won it while he was injured. The title was eventually held up after several controversial finishes to matches between the two. After a 30-minute Iron Man Match ended in a 1–1 draw at Beach Blast on July 18, a best-of-three series was set between the two on WCW Saturday Night; Rude won the first match on August 28, but lost to Rhodes twice on September 4 and 11, losing his chance at regaining the United States Heavyweight Championship.

==== International World Heavyweight Champion; retirement (1993–1994) ====
Rude switched his sights to the NWA World Heavyweight Championship, making his intentions clear on August 28, 1993, when he was the guest on then-champion Ric Flair's "A Flair For the Gold" talk segment. Rude defeated Flair for the title in September 1993 at Fall Brawl '93: War Games. As WCW had recently withdrawn from the NWA, WCW lost the rights to continue using the NWA World Heavyweight Championship. WCW created their own championship, dubbing it the WCW International World Heavyweight Championship, which Rude lost to Hiroshi Hase on March 16, 1994, in Tokyo, Japan. Rude regained the title just eight days later in Kyoto, Japan.

After dropping the title to Sting on April 17 at Spring Stampede, Rude pinned Sting on May 1 at Wrestling Dontaku in Fukuoka to become a three-time champion. Rude, however, injured his back during the match when, upon receiving a suicide dive at ringside, he landed on the corner of the raised platform surrounding the ring; unable to wrestle, he was stripped of the title (with the storyline excuse that he was found to have used the title belt as a weapon in the course of the match). Rude retired shortly thereafter.

=== Extreme Championship Wrestling (1997) ===
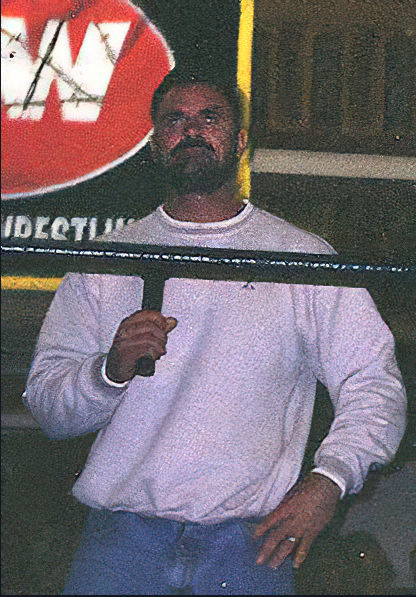
Rude at an Extreme Championship Wrestling television taping in October 1997

Rude collected on a Lloyd's of London insurance policy and did not appear in wrestling again until January 1997, when he joined Extreme Championship Wrestling (ECW) as a masked man. Rude debuted at House Party, declaring that his New Year's resolution was to "fuck with the Franchise" (Shane Douglas). Rude went on to repeatedly harass Douglas, at one point spanking Douglas' valet Francine during Crossing the Line Again.

He eventually unmasked and became a color commentator before later aligning himself, for a short time, with Douglas and his Triple Threat stable. In the main event of ECW Heat Wave 1997, Rude made a one-off return to the ring in a six-man tag team match, where he partnered with ECW mainstays Tommy Dreamer and The Sandman to face Jerry Lawler and ECW stars Rob Van Dam and Sabu, only to betray Dreamer and The Sandman. During the ECW versus USWA/WWF inter-company competition, Rude helped Lawler win matches against Dreamer and The Sandman.

=== World Wrestling Federation (1997) ===
On August 11, 1997, Rude returned to the WWF as the "insurance policy" of the group that would become known as D-Generation X (DX) (Shawn Michaels, Triple H, and Chyna). The D-Generation X name was first used on October 13, 1997. As a member of DX, Rude never wrestled, but stayed ringside during the group's matches. A few days after the Montreal Screwjob at Survivor Series, Rude once again left the WWF. According to Bret Hart, Rude stayed in the locker room during Bret's confrontation with Vince McMahon after the match in Montreal, and later called Eric Bischoff, informing Bischoff that what had happened was in fact real. Rude was not signed to a full-time contract with the WWF, and was instead performing on a "pay-per-appearance" basis. Rude was able to negotiate a deal with Bischoff and WCW, in large part due to his anger over the Montreal Screwjob.

=== Return to WCW (1997–1999) ===
Rude appeared on both the WWF's Raw Is War and WCW's Monday Nitro in the same night on November 17, 1997. A mustached Rude appeared on Nitro, which was live, and proceeded to criticize Vince McMahon, Shawn Michaels, DX, and the WWF, calling the company the "Titanic" (a reference to Titan Sports, as WWF's parent company was then known, as the "sinking ship"). An hour later on Raw Is War (which had been taped six days earlier), Rude then appeared with the full beard he had been sporting during his last few weeks in the WWF. Rude also appeared on ECW's Hardcore TV during that weekend (November 14–16 as the show was syndicated differently depending on the market). Rude was still making ECW appearances while he was in D-Generation X, as the WWF and ECW often co-operated in terms of talent.

In WCW, Rude became a member of the New World Order (nWo), managing his friend Curt Hennig. Thus, Rude became the first wrestler to be part of both DX and nWo. When the nWo split, Hennig and Rude initially sided with the nWo Wolfpac during May 1998. But their time with the "Red & Black" was very brief. At The Great American Bash, they turned on fellow Wolfpac member Konnan by attacking him after he lost to the then-undefeated Goldberg, resulting in Hennig and Rude both joining nWo Hollywood instead.

By late 1998, both Rude and Hennig were off WCW television due to injuries. Hennig had an ongoing leg injury that year, and Rude was thought to have had testicular cancer which later turned out to be a spermatocele. Hennig returned to the nWo from his injury at Starrcade without Rude, who was still unable to appear and was not included in the nWo reunion that happened during January 1999. Rude officially left WCW in April 1999, with his last appearance coming on the April 5, 1999 edition of WCW Monday Nitro Backstage Blast.

== Personal life ==
In 1976, Rude married Cheryl Holler. The couple later divorced in 1982.

In 1988, Rude married his second wife, Michelle, and the couple remained together until his death in 1999. They had three children together, Richard Jr., Merissa, and Colton. His younger son, Colton, died on September 3, 2016, in a motorcycle accident in Rome, Georgia, at the age of 19.

Bret Hart has claimed that despite his womanizing character, "Ravishing One" persona, Rude was a devoted family man who never took his wedding ring off even during matches, but instead covered it up with tape.

== Death ==
Rude was found unconscious by his wife and died on the morning of April 20, 1999, at the age of 40 when he suffered from heart failure. An autopsy report showed he died from an overdose of "mixed medications". At the time of his death, Rude was in training for a return to the ring. The effects of gamma-hydroxybutyrate (GHB), a narcolepsy prevention drug, may have contributed to his death.

== Legacy ==
On March 6, 2017, WWE announced that Rick Rude would be inducted into the WWE Hall of Fame. Ricky "The Dragon" Steamboat inducted Rude. Michelle, Merissa, and Richard Jr. accepted on his behalf.

== Championships and accomplishments ==
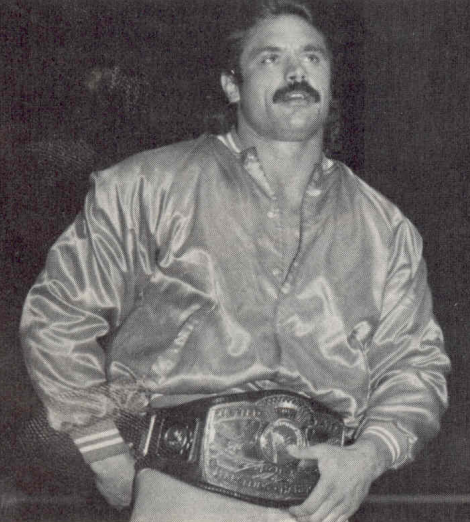
Rude as NWA United States Tag Team Champion (Florida version), c. 1985

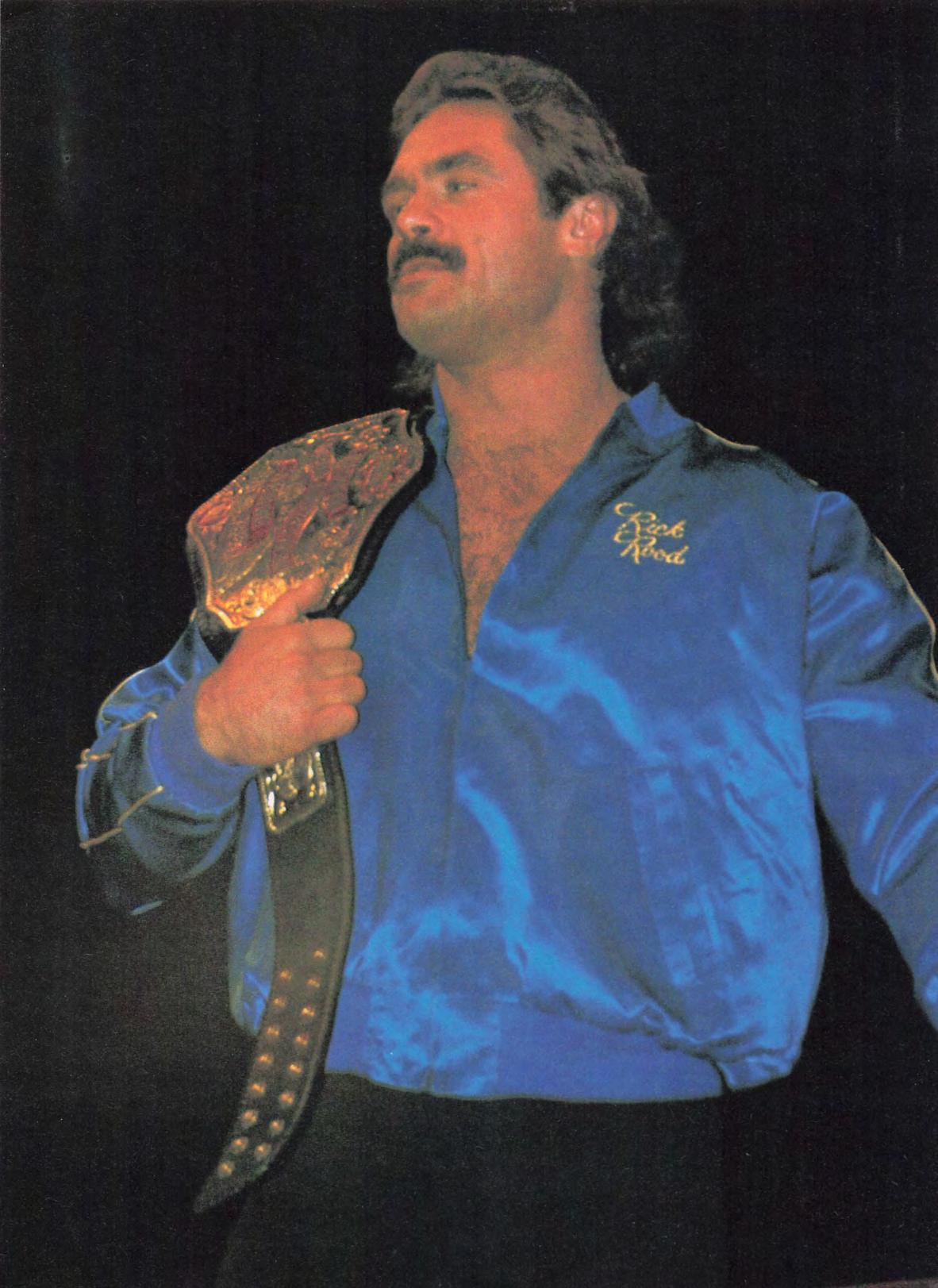
Rude as WCWA World Heavyweight Champion, c. 1986

Rude (left) as NWA Southern Heavyweight Championship (Florida version), c. 1985

- Championship Wrestling from Florida
  - NWA Southern Heavyweight Championship (Florida version) (2 times)
  - NWA United States Tag Team Championship (Florida version) (1 time) – with Jesse Barr
- Continental Wrestling Association
  - NWA/AWA Southern Heavyweight Championship (1 time)
  - NWA/AWA Southern Tag Team Championship (1 time) – with King Kong Bundy
- Jim Crockett Promotions / World Championship Wrestling
  - WCW International World Heavyweight Championship (3 times)
  - WCW United States Heavyweight Championship (1 time)
  - NWA World Tag Team Championship (Mid-Atlantic version) (1 time) – with Manny Fernandez
  - Nintendo Top Ten Challenge Tournament (1992)
- Memphis Wrestling Hall of Fame
  - Class of 2022
- Pro Wrestling Illustrated
  - Most Hated Wrestler of the Year (1992)
  - PWI ranked him No. 4 of the top 500 singles wrestlers in the PWI 500 in 1992
  - PWI ranked him No. 57 of the top 500 singles wrestlers of the "PWI Years" in 2003
- World Class Championship Wrestling / World Class Wrestling Association
  - NWA American Heavyweight Championship (1 time)
  - WCWA Television Championship (1 time)
  - WCWA World Heavyweight Championship (1 time)
- World Wrestling Federation / WWE
  - WWF Intercontinental Championship (1 time)
  - WWE Hall of Fame (Class of 2017)
  - 20 Man Royal Rumble (March 16, 1988)
  - Slammy Award (1 time)
    - Jesse "The Body" Award (1987)
- Wrestling Observer Newsletter
  - Best Heel (1992)
  - Most Unimproved (1993)
  - Worst Worked Match of the Year (1992) vs. Masahiro Chono at Halloween Havoc

== See also ==
- List of premature professional wrestling deaths
