= Buck Zumhofe =

American former professional wrestler

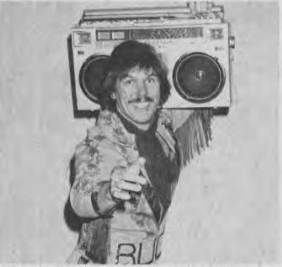
- Zumhofe, c. 1982
- Born: Eugene Otto Zumhofe; March 21, 1951 (age 75); Ham Lake, Minnesota, U.S.
- Citizenship: United States
- Education: Anoka-Ramsey Community College
- Status: Incarcerated at MCF – Willow River/Moose Lake, Minnesota
- Convictions: Criminal sexual conduct, escape from custody
- Penalty: 25 years in prison
- Professional wrestling career
- Ring name(s): Buck Zumhofe; Mean Ma Miller
- Billed height: 5 ft 10 in (1.78 m)
- Billed weight: 220 lb (100 kg)
- Billed from: Minneapolis, Minnesota
- Trained by: Verne Gagne
- Debut: 1976
- Retired: 2013

Eugene Otto Zumhofe (born March 21, 1951) is an American convicted sex offender and former professional wrestler. In 2014, Zumhofe was sentenced to 25 years in prison for criminal sexual conduct.

Zumhofe worked as a professional wrestler under the ring name Buck Zumhofe. Nicknamed "The King of Rock n' Roll", he was one of the stars of the lightweight divisions for the American Wrestling Association (AWA) and World Class Championship Wrestling (WCCW) during the 1980s. He was a sporadic jobber for the World Wrestling Federation (WWF) during the 1980s and 1990s, and later ran his own independent promotion.

Between 1986 and 2014, Zumhofe was convicted of sexual crimes or domestic abuse on four occasions. As of September 2026, Zumhofe is incarcerated at MCF – Willow River/Moose Lake for 12 counts of criminal sexual conduct.

== Professional wrestling career ==
Zumhofe was trained by Verne Gagne along with Ricky Steamboat, Scott Irwin and The Iron Sheik. As part of his gimmick, he carried a boombox around at all times, and he became a popular light heavyweight competitor in the American Wrestling Association (AWA) in the early and mid 1980s. He feuded primarily with "Mr. Electricity" Steve Regal over the AWA World Light Heavyweight Championship during that time. Zumhofe also wrestled in World Class Championship Wrestling (WCCW) where he teamed with Iceman King Parsons as the Rock 'n' Soul Connection. The team held the WCCW American Tag Team titles twice and rose to main event status on the World Class weekly tour loop as the Von Erichs (the established main event talents) would only wrestle in major cities. As a singles wrestler in WCCW, Zumhofe reached the final of the TV title tournament in March 1985, where he lost to Rip Oliver. Zumhofe left WCCW in October 1985.

Returning to the AWA in 1985, he won his second AWA World Light Heavyweight Championship by defeating Steve Regal, but was forced to vacate the title in July 1986 after he was sent to prison following his conviction for sexual misconduct. In 1988, he wrestled for Windy City Wrestling and Pro Wrestling America. In 1989, after his release from prison, Zumhofe again returned to the AWA. In 1990, he won the AWA World Light Heavyweight title for the third time, defeating Jonnie Stewart. He feuded with Stewart over the title until the promotion closed in 1991.

Zumhofe also made sporadic appearances for the World Wrestling Federation as a jobber during the 80s and 90s. He was the first wrestler to be put in a body bag by The Undertaker and was also the first wrestler to face Triple H in 1995. During Zumhofe's career he also wrestled for Roy Shire's promotion in San Francisco, in Vancouver for Al Tomko, in Portland for Don Owen, and in Japan for Giant Baba.

In 2000, Zumhofe opened the Rock & Roll Wrestling promotion, which ran shows in Minnesota, Iowa, Illinois, Wisconsin, and North and South Dakota.

== Legal issues ==
Zumhofe was jailed in July 1986 when he was found guilty of sexual misconduct involving a minor.

In 1989, he served 36 months in prison after being convicted of fourth degree sexual conduct with a minor.

In 1999, he was convicted of a domestic abuse violation.

Zumhofe was again arrested on May 27, 2013, and charged with twelve felony counts of criminal sexual misconduct for sexually abusing his daughter between June 1999 and June 2011, beginning when she was 15 years old. He was convicted on all twelve counts on March 5, 2014. Following the verdict, Zumhofe attempted to flee from the court house, but was quickly tackled by court officers and charged with "escape from custody". On May 6, 2014, he was sentenced to 25 years in prison on two first-degree and two third-degree counts of criminal sexual conduct. The judge ordered the sentences on the four counts to be served consecutively. His escape from custody charges were eventually sentenced to run concurrently with his 2014 criminal sexual conduct sentence.

As of 2026, Zumhofe is incarcerated at Minnesota Correctional Facility – Willow River/Moose Lake.

== Championships and accomplishments ==
- American Wrestling Association
  - AWA World Light Heavyweight Championship (3 times)
- Midwest Pro Wrestling
  - MPW Tag Team Championship (1 time) – with Buck Zumhofe, Jr.
- Nu-Age Wrestling
  - NAW Light Heavyweight Championship (1 time)
- World Class Championship Wrestling
  - NWA American Tag Team Championship (2 times) – with Iceman Parsons
