= Royal Rumble (2005) =

World Wrestling Entertainment pay-per-view event

- Promotional poster featuring various WWE wrestlers, parodying West Side Story and its 1961 film adaption.
- Promotion: World Wrestling Entertainment
- Brand(s): Raw; SmackDown!
- Date: January 30, 2005
- City: Fresno, California
- Venue: Save Mart Center
- Attendance: 12,000
- Buy rate: 575,000
- Tagline: All the rumbling, minus the dancing and singing

Pay-per-view chronology
← Previous; New Year's Revolution	Next → No Way Out

Royal Rumble chronology
← Previous; 2004	Next → 2006

The 2005 Royal Rumble was a, professional wrestling pay-per-view (PPV) event produced by World Wrestling Entertainment (WWE), held for wrestlers from the promotion's Raw and SmackDown! brand divisions. It was the 18th annual Royal Rumble event and took place on January 30, 2005, at the Save Mart Center in Fresno, California.

The event was based around the men's Royal Rumble match, a modified 30-man battle royal in which the participants enter at timed intervals instead of all beginning in the ring at the same time and the winner received a world championship match at WrestleMania. For the 2005 event, the winner received their choice to challenge for either Raw's World Heavyweight Championship or SmackDown!'s WWE Championship at WrestleMania 21.

Five professional wrestling matches were featured on the event's supercard, a scheduling of more than one main event. The main event was the 2005 Royal Rumble match, which featured wrestlers from both brands. Raw's Batista, the 28th entrant, won the match by last eliminating SmackDown!'s John Cena, the 25th entrant. The primary match on the Raw brand was Triple H versus Randy Orton for the World Heavyweight Championship, which Triple H won by pinfall to retain the title. The primary match on the SmackDown! brand was a triple threat match for the WWE Championship between reigning champion John "Bradshaw" Layfield (JBL), Kurt Angle, and Big Show, which JBL won by pinning Angle. No tag team match was featured on the card, which made this the first PPV event since The Wrestling Classic in 1985 to not include one.

== Production ==
=== Background ===
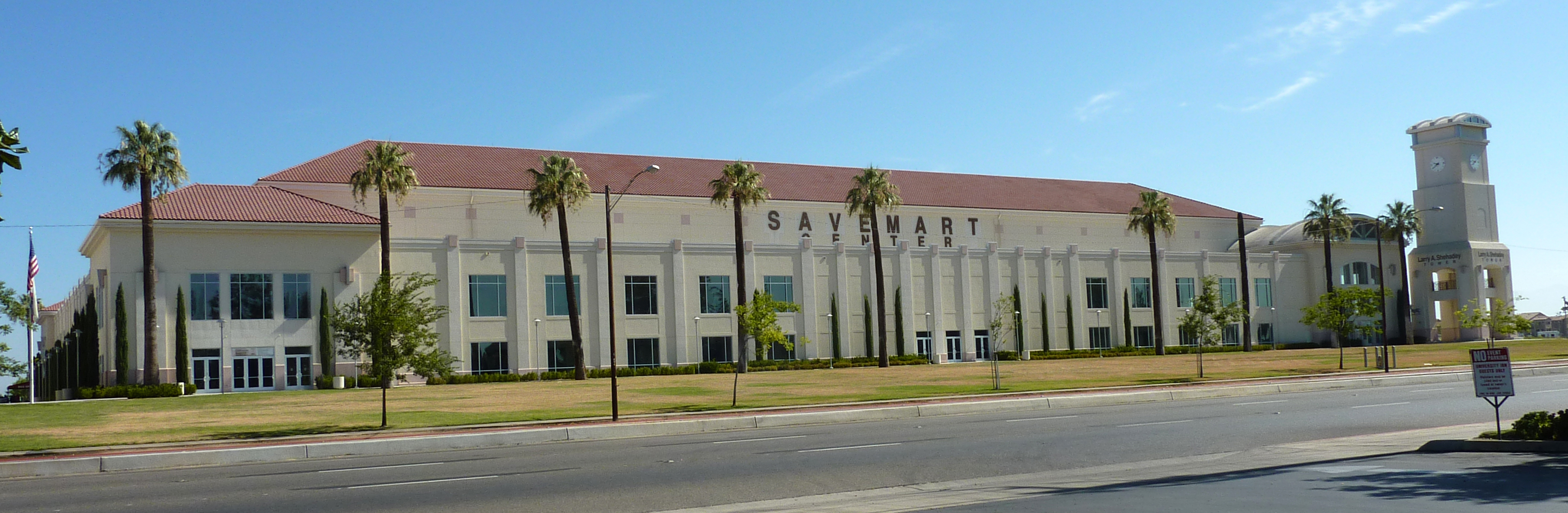
The 18th annual Royal Rumble event was held at the Save Mart Center in Fresno, California.

The Royal Rumble is an annual professional wrestling event, produced every January by World Wrestling Entertainment (WWE) since 1988; that first event was a television special before it became an annual pay-per-view (PPV) beginning in 1989. It is one of the promotion's original four pay-per-views, along with WrestleMania, SummerSlam, and Survivor Series, referred to as the "Big Four". It is named after and centered on the men's Royal Rumble match. The 18th Royal Rumble event was scheduled to be held on January 30, 2005, at the Save Mart Center in Fresno, California and featured wrestlers from the Raw and SmackDown! brands.

The Royal Rumble match is a modified battle royal in which the participants enter at timed intervals instead of all beginning in the ring at the same time, and the match generally features 30 wrestlers. Since 1993, the winner earns a world championship match at that year's WrestleMania. For 2005, the winner could choose to challenge for either Raw's World Heavyweight Championship or SmackDown!'s WWE Championship at WrestleMania 21.

=== Storylines ===
The event comprised five matches that resulted from scripted storylines. Results were predetermined by WWE's writers on the Raw and SmackDown brands, while storylines were produced on WWE's weekly television shows, Raw and SmackDown.

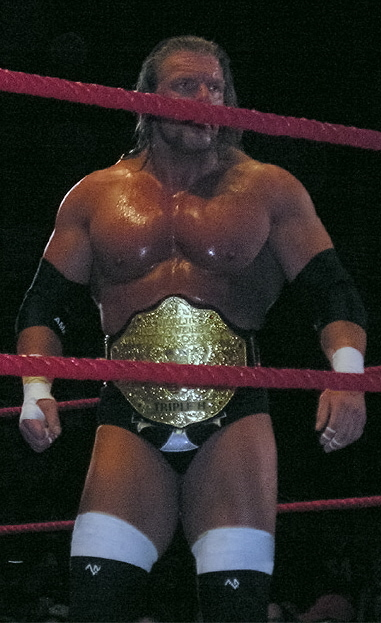
Triple H as Raw's World Heavyweight Champion

The main feud heading into the Royal Rumble on the Raw brand was between Triple H and Randy Orton over the World Heavyweight Championship. Their feud started on the August 16 episode of Raw, when Orton was kicked out of Evolution by Triple H. At Unforgiven, Triple H defeated Orton to win the World Heavyweight Championship after interference from Evolution members Batista and Ric Flair. At Survivor Series, Team Orton (Orton, Chris Benoit, Chris Jericho, and Maven) defeated Team Triple H (Triple H, Edge, Batista, and Snitsky) in a traditional Survivor Series elimination match to earn control of Raw after Orton last eliminated Triple H. At New Year's Revolution, Triple H won an Elimination Chamber match to win the vacant World Heavyweight Championship by last eliminating Orton after interference from Batista and Flair. On the January 10 episode of Raw, Orton defeated Batista to become the number one contender for the title at the Royal Rumble. On the January 17 episode of Raw, after a verbal confrontation between the two in the arena, Triple H ambushed Orton backstage. They fought until Orton tried to use a steel chair, and Triple H fled. On the January 24 episode of Raw, Orton defeated Flair, despite interference from Triple H.

The main feud on the SmackDown! brand was between John "Bradshaw" Layfield (JBL), The Big Show, and Kurt Angle, with the three feuding over the WWE Championship. On the December 16 episode of SmackDown!, Angle challenged JBL to a match for the WWE Championship. The Cabinet (Orlando Jordan, Doug, and Danny Basham) interfered and attacked Angle, causing the match to end via disqualification. They continued to attack Angle after the match until Big Show came out, beat down everyone, and signaled to JBL that he wanted the title. On the December 30 episode of SmackDown!, a triple threat match for the title between the three was booked for the Royal Rumble. Following this, JBL set up Angle to anger Big Show, but Angle angered JBL in response. After realizing this, on the January 20 episode of SmackDown!, JBL aligned himself with Big Show and confronted Angle; however, JBL turned on Big Show and beat him down with Angle. On the January 27 episode of SmackDown!, SmackDown! General Manager Theodore Long booked a Last Man Standing match between JBL and Angle for later that night. The two eventually turned on each other, and the match ended in a no contest. It was later revealed that the match was Big Show's idea.

Another feud heading into the event from SmackDown! was between The Undertaker and Heidenreich. Their feud first started at No Mercy when Heidenreich helped John "Bradshaw" Layfield (JBL) defeat The Undertaker in a Last Ride match by attacking The Undertaker and putting him in the hearse. At Survivor Series, The Undertaker defeated Heidenreich after executing a Tombstone Piledriver. At Armageddon, Heidenreich once again cost The Undertaker the WWE Championship against JBL after interfering in a fatal four-way match that involved Booker T and Eddie Guerrero, allowing JBL to pin Booker T to retain. SmackDown! General Manager Theodore Long let The Undertaker name the stipulation for his match against Heidenreich at the Royal Rumble. As Heidenreich mentioned his fear of caskets, The Undertaker chose to face him in a casket match for the Royal Rumble their first casket match at the event since the 1998 event involved with Shawn Michaels and the third occurrence the other was in the 1994 event involved with Yokozuna.

A preliminary Raw brand feud was between Shawn Michaels and Edge. Their feud started at Taboo Tuesday when Michaels was voted over Edge and Chris Benoit to face Triple H for the World Heavyweight Championship while Edge and Benoit were put into a World Tag Team Championship match against La Résistance. During the tag team title match, an angry Edge abandoned Benoit, which Benoit eventually won for his team, and instead interfered in the World Heavyweight Championship match, costing Michaels the championship. At New Year's Revolution, Edge competed in an Elimination Chamber match for the vacant World Heavyweight Championship with Michaels as the special guest referee. During the match, Edge accidentally speared Michaels, resulting in Michaels performing Sweet Chin Music on Edge, who would be eliminated by Chris Jericho. On the January 10 episode of Raw, a confrontation between Edge and Michaels ended in the two men brawling around the arena. A match between the two was then booked for the Royal Rumble.

Royal Rumble Qualification Matches

- Booker T and Charlie Haas defeated Luther Reigns and Mark Jindrak - SmackDown house show, January 9
- Shelton Benjamin defeated Maven - Raw, January 10
- Edge defeated Rhyno - Raw, January 10
- Chris Jericho defeated Muhammad Hassan - Raw house show, January 16
- Scotty 2 Hotty defeated Akio - SmackDown, January 18
- John Cena defeated Rene Dupree - SmackDown, January 18
- Rey Mysterio defeated Chavo Guerrero - SmackDown, January 18
- Viscera defeated Tajiri in a battle royal - Raw, January 24
- Batista defeated Rob Conway and Sylvain Grenier in a handicap match - Raw, January 24
- Muhammad Hassan defeated Val Venis - Raw, January 24
- Kane defeated Gene Snitsky and Maven in a triple threat match - Raw, January 24
- Paul London defeated Funaki, Shannon Moore, and Spike Dudley in a fatal four-way match - SmackDown, January 25

== Event ==
Other on-screen personnel
Role:	Name:
English commentators	Jim Ross (Raw/Royal Rumble match)
English commentators	Jerry Lawler (Raw)
English commentators	Michael Cole (SmackDown!)
English commentators	Tazz (SmackDown!/Royal Rumble match)
Spanish commentators	Carlos Cabrera (Spanish)
Spanish commentators	Hugo Savinovich (Spanish)
Ring announcers	Tony Chimel (SmackDown!)
Ring announcers	Howard Finkel (Raw/Royal Rumble Match)
Referees	Mike Chioda (Raw)
Referees	Jack Doan (Raw)
Referees	Brian Hebner (SmackDown!)
Referees	Earl Hebner (Raw)
Referees	Jim Korderas (SmackDown!)
Referees	Nick Patrick (SmackDown!)
Referees	Chad Patton (Raw)
Referees	Charles Robinson (SmackDown!)
General Managers	Eric Bischoff (Raw)
General Managers	Theodore Long (SmackDown!)
Bingo machine tumbler	Christy Hemme (Raw)
Bingo machine tumbler	Torrie Wilson (SmackDown!)

=== Preliminary matches ===
Before the event went live on pay-per-view, Maven defeated Rhyno in a match taped for Sunday Night Heat.

The first match was between Edge and Shawn Michaels. Edge mocked Michaels by performing some of Michaels' signature taunts. Edge gained the advantage after an Edge-O-Matic on the floor. Edge performed a spear on the floor on Michaels; in the ring, Edge executed another spear on Michaels for a near-fall. After countering Edge, Michaels executed a diving elbow drop on Edge. Edge countered Sweet Chin Music into an electric chair drop for a near-fall. Edge applied the Edgecator on Michaels, but Michaels broke the hold. Michaels attempted a roll-up, but Edge pinned Michaels with a roll-up using the ropes to win the match.

The second match was a casket match between The Undertaker and Heidenreich. The match started back and forth until Heidenreich sent Undertaker into the casket. Undertaker applied the triangle choke until Gene Snitsky interfered and attacked Undertaker. Snitsky and Heidenreich attacked The Undertaker and called for the casket to be opened but Kane was revealed to be inside the casket. He attacked Snitsky and Heidenreich and fought Snitsky throughout the arena. Heidenreich sent Undertaker into the steel steps and pushed the casket into him. Heidenreich put Undertaker in the casket after applying the cobra clutch but Undertaker stopped the lid from closing. Heidenreich put Undertaker in the casket again but Undertaker countered. Undertaker executed a chokeslam and a Tombstone Piledriver and put Heidenreich in the casket to win the match.

The third match was a triple threat match for the WWE Championship between John "Bradshaw" Layfield (JBL), The Big Show, and Kurt Angle. Angle stayed on the outside of the ring as Big Show and JBL fought. After Angle broke up a pinfall attempt, Big Show attacked both men. Angle hit Big Show with a television monitor, causing him to fall through a broadcast announce table. Later, Big Show executed a chokeslam on JBL but JBL placed his foot on the ropes to void the pinfall. Big Show tackled JBL through the barricade and performed a flapjack to Angle onto a chair. Luther Reigns, Mark Jindrak and Doug and Danny Basham attacked Big Show as Orlando Jordan helped JBL back into the ring. JBL executed a Clothesline from Hell on Angle to retain the title.

The fourth match was between Triple H and Randy Orton for the World Heavyweight Championship. Before the match, Raw General Manager Eric Bischoff banned Evolution (Batista and Ric Flair) from ringside. Orton had the advantage until Triple H countered an RKO by throwing Orton out of the ring. Triple H kept the advantage and targeted Orton's left knee until Orton knocked him into a broadcast table. Orton kept the advantage until he missed a DDT. Triple H knocked both Orton and the referee down with a clothesline and tried to hit Orton with a sledgehammer but Orton pulled him into the ringpost. Triple H performed another clothesline and a Pedigree to retain the title.

=== Main event match ===
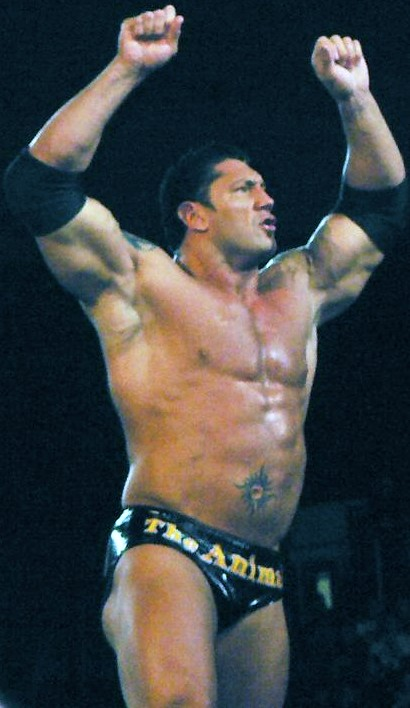
Batista eliminated John Cena to win the 2005 Royal Rumble match

The main event was the Royal Rumble match. Before the match, Kurt Angle stole Nunzio's number and replaced him in the match. The participants divided into their brands and fought against each other, working together to eliminate Muhammad Hassan, the thirteen entrant (who had garnered heat at the time). Scotty 2 Hotty, the fifteenth entrant, was attacked by Hassan during his entrance and never entered the match. Angle, the twentieth entrant, dominated upon entering until Shawn Michaels eliminated him. Angle came back to eliminate Michaels and attacked him. The final four participants remaining were Batista, John Cena, Edge, and Rey Mysterio. Edge fought with Mysterio, executing a spear to eliminate Mysterio. Cena and Batista then eliminated Edge as he was attacking them. Cena tried to perform an FU on Batista but Batista countered. Batista then attempted a Batista Bomb, but was countered with a headscissors takedown by Cena, sending both over the top rope and touching the floor at the same time (though only one of Cena's feet actually touched, the other landed on Batista's back). The referees for the Raw brand believed Batista to be the winner while the SmackDown! referees believed Cena to be winner. WWE Chairman Vince McMahon came to the ring in a fit of rage, in the process legitimately tearing both of his quadriceps muscles when his knees were caught on the apron. With the planned finish and attempt to restart the match both botched, McMahon ordered the match to be restarted with the final two participants. Batista eliminated Cena following a spinebuster to win the match.

== Aftermath ==
=== Raw ===
The following weeks on Raw surrounded Batista's choice of which champion to face at WrestleMania 21. Triple H devised a scheme to have Batista almost run over by a limousine resembling John "Bradshaw" Layfield (JBL)'s, so Batista would challenge JBL instead of himself. Batista became aware of the scheme and chose to face Triple H for the World Heavyweight Championship at WrestleMania, thus leaving the Evolution stable in the process. He won the title, and their feud continued until he was drafted to SmackDown! on June 30. Batista remained champion until the January 13, 2006, episode of SmackDown! when he vacated the title due to injury.

=== SmackDown ===
John Cena went on to win a tournament to become the number one contender to the WWE Championship at WrestleMania 21. The tournament concluded in a match between him and Kurt Angle at No Way Out, which Cena won after performing an FU. Following this, he began an angle with JBL. Cena defeated JBL to win the title at WrestleMania, and their feud ended after Cena retained the title in an "I Quit" match at Judgment Day. Cena would then go to hold on to the title until New Year's Revolution 2006 when Edge cashed in the Money in the Bank contract he won at WrestleMania 21 and defeated Cena after an Elimination Chamber match.

Following the Royal Rumble, Randy Orton and Kurt Angle began feuding with The Undertaker and Shawn Michaels, respectively. Big Show faced JBL in the first ever barbed wire Steel Cage match for the title at No Way Out, which JBL won to retain the title. Orton briefly feuded with Christian before moving on to feud with The Undertaker, which spanned nine months. After losing his title match at No Way Out, Big Show faced Akebono in a sumo match at WrestleMania, and he briefly feuded with Carlito afterwards.

=== Future ===
During the 2005 WWE Draft Lottery in June, the World Heavyweight Championship and WWE Championship switched brands.

== Results ==
No.	Results	Stipulations	Times
1^{H}	Maven defeated Rhyno	Singles match	7:01
2	Edge defeated Shawn Michaels	Singles match	18:32
3	The Undertaker defeated Heidenreich	Casket match	13:19
4	John "Bradshaw" Layfield (c) defeated Big Show and Kurt Angle	Triple threat match for the WWE Championship	12:04
5	Triple H (c) defeated Randy Orton	Singles match for the World Heavyweight Championship Evolution Banned from Ringside	21:28
6	Batista won by last eliminating John Cena	30-man Royal Rumble match for a world championship match at WrestleMania 21	51:27
(c) / – the champion(s) heading into the match; H / – the match was broadcast prior to the pay-per-view on Sunday Night Heat

=== Royal Rumble entrances and eliminations ===
– Raw
– SmackDown!
– Winner

Draw	Entrant	Brand	Order eliminated	Eliminated by	Time	Eliminations
1	Eddie Guerrero	SmackDown!	11	Edge	28:11	3
2	Chris Benoit	Raw	25	Batista & Ric Flair	47:26	3
3	Daniel Puder	SmackDown!	1	Hardcore Holly	04:09	0
4	Hardcore Holly	SmackDown!	2	Chris Benoit & Eddie Guerrero	01:59	1
5	The Hurricane	Raw	3	Chris Benoit & Eddie Guerrero	01:04	0
6	Kenzo Suzuki	SmackDown!	4	Rey Mysterio	03:31	0
7	Edge	Raw	28	Batista & John Cena	40:19	5
8	Rey Mysterio	SmackDown!	27	Edge	38:25	2
9	Shelton Benjamin	Raw	10	Edge	14:35	1
10	Booker T	SmackDown!	9	Rey Mysterio & Eddie Guerrero	10:42	3
11	Chris Jericho	Raw	21	Batista	28:22	2
12	Luther Reigns	SmackDown!	7	Booker T	07:13	1
13	Muhammad Hassan	Raw	5	Booker T, Chris Benoit, Chris Jericho, Edge, Luther Reigns & Shelton Benjamin	00:54	0
14	Orlando Jordan	SmackDown!	8	Booker T	03:36	0
15	Scotty 2 Hotty	SmackDown!	6	Unable to compete	N/A	0
16	Charlie Haas	SmackDown!	13	Shawn Michaels	06:20	0
17	René Duprée	SmackDown!	16	Chris Jericho	11:32	0
18	Simon Dean	Raw	12	Shawn Michaels	00:20	0
19	Shawn Michaels	Raw	15	Kurt Angle	04:56	3
20	Kurt Angle	SmackDown!	14	Shawn Michaels	00:37	1
21	Jonathan Coachman	Raw	23	Ric Flair	13:48	0
22	Mark Jindrak	SmackDown!	19	Kane	08:15	0
23	Viscera	Raw	17	John Cena	03:00	0
24	Paul London	SmackDown!	18	Gene Snitsky	03:15	0
25	John Cena	SmackDown!	29	Batista	15:28	3
26	Gene Snitsky	Raw	20	Batista	03:38	1
27	Kane	Raw	22	John Cena	03:54	1
28	Batista	Raw	—	Winner	10:54	6
29	Christian	Raw	24	Batista	02:09	0
30	Ric Flair	Raw	26	Edge	01:58	2

Scotty was attacked by Hassan before he made it to the ring, and therefore was unable to compete and never officially entered the match.

Kurt Angle had been eliminated by Shawn Michaels and then returned to the ring, and eliminated Michaels in retaliation.
