= Joy Giovanni =

American professional wrestler, actress, and model (born 1978)

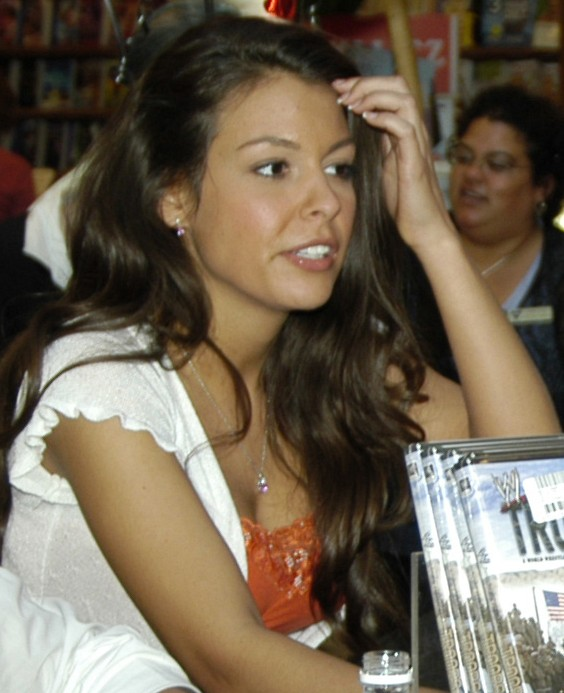
- Giovanni in April 2005

Personal information
- Born: January 20, 1978 (age 48) Boston, Massachusetts, U.S.
- Spouse: Joseph Giovanni
- Children: 2
- Website: joyfulmedium.com

Professional wrestling career
- Ring name: Joy Giovanni
- Billed height: 5 ft 4 in (1.63 m)
- Billed weight: 125 lb (57 kg)
- Billed from: Boston, Massachusetts
- Trained by: Daniel Puder, Fit Finlay, The Undertaker
- Debut: November 2004
- Retired: July 2005

Joy Giovanni, (born January 20, 1978), is a retired Italian-American actress, model and professional valet. She is best known for her time with World Wrestling Entertainment (WWE), where she worked on the Smackdown! brand. She was the first and only winner of the WWE's Rookie Diva of the Year award.

== Modeling career ==
In 2001, Giovanni won the L.A Model Expo she posed as a lingerie and swimsuit model, posing in multiple magazines. She posed for Bench Warmer trading cards in the 2004 and 2005 trading sets. Giovanni also competed in the 2004 and 2005 Lingerie Bowl events a part of the Los Angeles Temptations team.

In 2005, she was a guest judge for the G4 show, Video Game Vixens.

She featured in the 2005 direct to DVD WWE special, Viva Las Divas photoshoot. She was also in the WWE 2005 SummerSlam diva promotional car wash photoshoot. In 2006, Giovanni appeared in Avenged Sevenfold's music video, Beast and the Harlot.

== Acting career ==
Giovanni made cameo appearances as an extra in various television shows, including; CSI: Crime Scene Investigation, Monk, NCIS and Entourage. In 2004, she appeared in the film The Girl Next Door and the independent film Instinct vs. Reason. In 2005, she played an air stewardess in the independent film When All Else Fails.

In 2007, Giovanni had a leading role in the Rolfe Kanesky film; Pretty Cool Too, as June.

== Professional wrestling career ==
=== World Wrestling Entertainment (2004–2005) ===
Giovanni first appeared for the WWE participating in the WWE 2004 Diva Search, where she ultimately placed third. Despite being eliminated, WWE would sign her to an official contract just a few days after her elimination, which aired live on the September 13 episode of RAW. During the WWE Diva Search, she participated in the WWE Diva Dodgeball game at the WWE 2004 SummerSlam event a part of the winning team, Team Diva Search. She also participated in the controversial, infamous Diss The Diva challenge hosted by Stacy Keibler, during an episode of RAW Giovanni alongside remaining diva search contestants; Amy Weber, Carmella DeCesare and Christy Hemme competed in a live shoot promo challenge, the segment has gained notoriety for being one of WWE's most explicit segments in history. Giovanni called out contestant Carmella DeCesare stating; "Carmella, you talk a lot of shit, but look at you, you've got a gap so wide you could drive a truck right through there baby!". DeCesare responded by outing Giovanni as a mother, something she had not told WWE higher-ups, as during this time there was a stigma against women having children in the industry. In a 2023, interview Giovanni revealed that she was confronted by Stephanie McMahon backstage about having a child.

Despite being eliminated from the Diva Search, WWE hired Giovanni and she officially debuted on the Smackdown! brand in November, 2004, as a massage therapist and also acted as a special guest timekeeper, where Eddie Guerrero would regularly flirt with her at ringside. On the November, 25, episode of Smackdown!, Giovanni and Big Show hosted a Thanksgiving party, only to be confronted by Luther Reigns, who would hit Giovanni in the face with a pie, prompting a food fight in the ring. The following week on Smackdown! she was confronted by Reigns again, who tried to force Giovanni to go on a date with him, causing Show to save her, this prompted Giovanni to become Show's valet and on-screen girlfriend accompanying him to the ring, cementing her in the main storyline of Smackdown!. Giovanni began feuding with Amy Weber, they would get in to a catfight on the December, 16, episode of Smackdown! after Giovanni gave John "Bradshaw" Layfield a candy cane at ringside. At Armageddon, Giovanni kissed Show wishing him good luck before his handicap match against Kurt Angle, Luther Reigns and Mark Jindrak, which Show won. On the January, 6, episode of Smackdown! Giovanni refused to sign Carlito's petition, resulting in him spitting an apple in her face. On the same episode of Smackdown! Angle was tricked in to walking in to Giovanni's locker room by Weber, to scare her while she showered which caused her to run backstage in a towel, in to Show's arms. This resulted in Show chasing Angle to the ring in defense of Giovanni and attack him. It was then revealed as a trick by The Cabinet to get Show and Angle angry with each other. At the Royal Rumble, she was shown arriving to the arena with Show. On the January 13 episode of Smackdown! Giovanni and Weber would get in to another catfight, Smackdown! general manager Theodore Long would schedule a singles match between Giovanni and Weber, banning Show and Layfield from ringside, Giovanni did not show up to the ring for her match therefore losing by forfeit to Weber. It was then revealed Giovanni was kidnapped by Angle, after she was discovered bound and gagged in Layfield's limousine trunk to prevent the match from happening. On the January, 20, episode of Smackdown! Angle was forced to issue an open apology to Giovanni, but when Show came down to the ring, Angle tried to leave the arena only to be ushered back by The Cabinet, this turned out to be another ploy as Angle and The Cabinet all attacked Show. On the January, 27, episode of Smackdown! Giovanni threw a strawberry yoghurt in Weber's face after overhearing her badmouthing Giovanni to the other Smackdown! divas. The following week Giovanni hit Weber over the head with a fish bowl and attacked her, resulting in her being removed from the Smackdown! arena. After Weber's abrupt departure from WWE in February, 2005, due to an alleged harassment incident during an overseas tour involving WWE superstars Edge and Randy Orton, their feud was suddenly dropped. Giovanni stated in a 2023, interview with Ring The Belle, that she and Weber were working towards a singles match at the 2005 No Way Out pay-per-view.

Giovanni went on to win the first and only WWE Rookie Diva of the Year contest, hosted by Dawn Marie and Torrie Wilson, at No Way Out, defeating rookie divas; Lauren Jones, Michelle McCool and Rochelle Loewen. The contest included; an evening gown contest, a talent contest, in which she massaged host Torrie Wilson, and a swimsuit contest. Giovanni won with 65% of the votes. After winning the contest Giovanni and the fellow Smackdown! divas became involved in brief feuds with the villainous Smackdown! divas; Dawn Marie and Melina. At WrestleMania 21 Giovanni appeared in multiple promo videos; including a Taxi Driver parody, she also accompanied the WWE 2005 Hall of Fame inductees to the WrestleMania stage.

She continued appearing on Smackdown! in backstage segments, bikini contests and lingerie contests, including one on the April 7 episode of Smackdown! where she was the runner-up in the Viva Las Vegas Divas bikini contest to Torrie Wilson. She also began training to wrestle with Fit Finlay and The Undertaker. In May 2005, she featured in a number of backstage segments as the friend of Sharmell comforting her during her feud with Kurt Angle. Giovanni then became a ring girl, featuring in weekly segments that involved coming out to greet the Smackdown! fans, shooting t-shirts to fans in the audience or venturing in to the crowd to meet fans alongside Torrie Wilson. She then began sporadically appearing at Smackdown! house shows in bikini contests. She was featured in the direct to DVD WWE Viva Las Divas special and was featured in the WWE 2005 SummerSlam Diva promotional car wash photoshoot. She made her video game debut as a playable wrestler in WWE Smackdown! vs. RAW 2006.

Giovanni was released from her contract due to budget cuts on July 6, 2005, despite just signing a 3 year contract with the company.

After her WWE stint Giovanni made multiple appearances at wrestling conventions, in 2009, she had a couple appearances at independent wrestling events. Giovanni and Weber released a DVD with Big Vision Entertainment in 2009 labelled Amy vs. Joy. The DVD focused on their WWE feud and featured bonus interviews and clips, including clips of Giovanni training for an in-ring debut with former WWE superstar and MMA fighter; Daniel Puder.

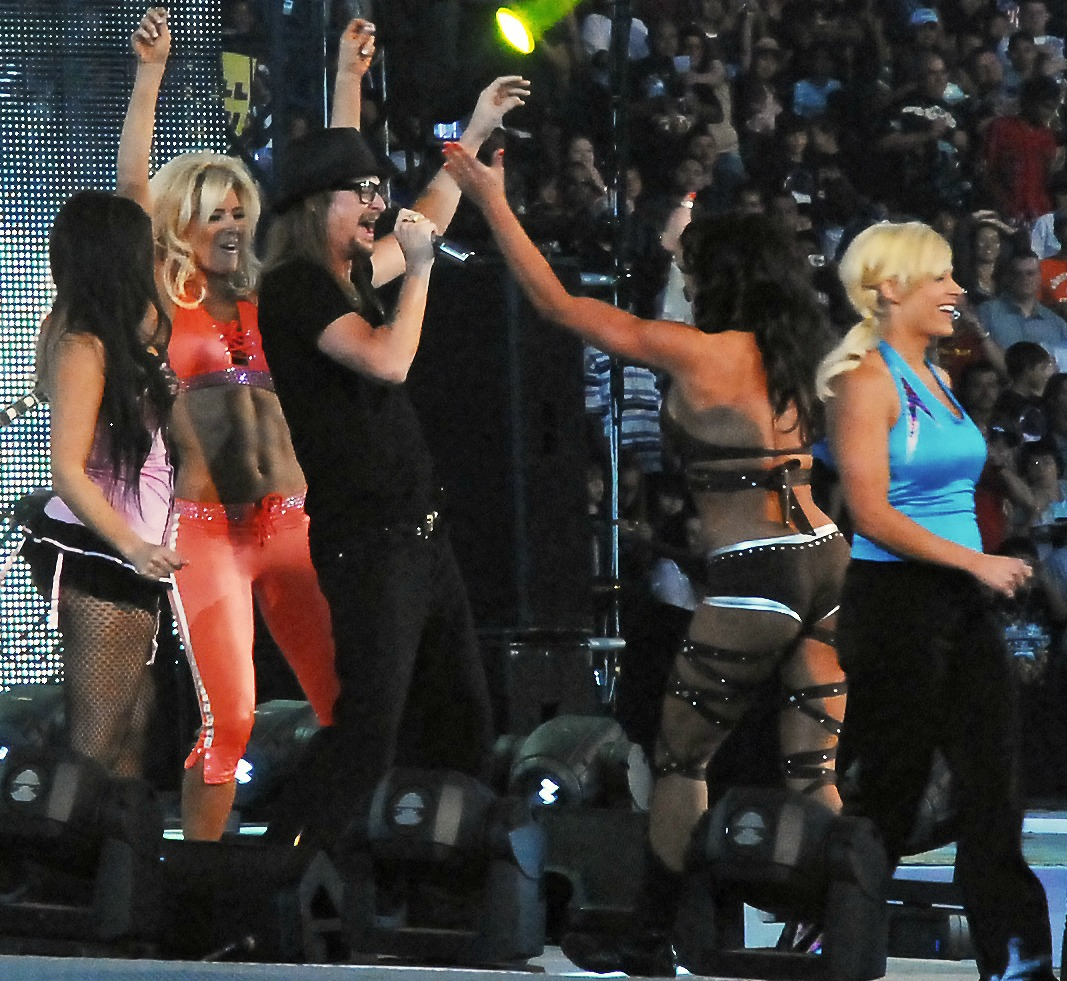
Joy Giovanni making her entrance at WrestleMania XXV in April 2009, with legend divas by her side.

=== Sporadic WWE appearances (2009, 2015, 2018) ===
Giovanni returned at WWE's WrestleMania 25 event, making her official in-ring debut in a 25 Diva battle royal, to determine the first WWE Miss WrestleMania and to celebrate 25 years of women at WrestleMania. Giovanni was one of the six legend divas to return for one night only alongside; Miss Jackie, Molly Holly, Sunny, Torrie Wilson and Victoria. Giovanni was eliminated second by The Bella Twins. She was also in attendance at the WWE 2009 Hall of Fame ceremony.

In 2015, during WrestleMania 31, WWE announced multiple new reality shows set to air on the WWE Network, including a returning Diva Search. The official advertisement video package for the returning Diva Search featured clips of the most successful former Diva Search contestants, including Giovanni. The show was ultimately canceled in late 2015, due to WWE phasing out the term "Diva" that same year.

In 2018, Giovanni was referenced on the Smackdown! 1000 episode special in a rap celebrating 80 of the most memorable Smackdown! stars by American rapper, Bodie.

== Personal life ==
Giovanni is of Italian descent. In 2010, she began working an internship for a chiropractor in Los Angeles, California, she also became recertified in massage therapy for a new business venture. She opened a massage therapy business in San Diego, California in 2014.

Giovanni has a son who was born October 20, 1998, and a daughter who was born November 19, 2000. Giovanni and her long time husband Joseph Giovanni filed for divorce in 2021.

As of 2025 Giovanni works as a psychic medium and tarot reader. She is currently living in California. She hosts a podcast titled Spirit Speakeasy and regularly guest features on different podcasts. Since leaving the professional wrestling industry she remains close friends with Amy Weber and René Duprée.

== Filmography ==
Film
Year	Title	Role	Notes
2003	Psychoanalysis Changed My Life	Background extra	Short film
2004	The Girl Next Door	Student	
2004	Instinct vs. Reason	Stripper	
2004	Faces	Model	
2005	When All Else Fails	Air stewardess	
2006	Hollywood	Actress	Short film
2007	Pretty Cool Too	June	

Television as actress
Year	Title	Role	Notes
2003	CSI: Crime Scene Investigation	Background extra	1 episode
2003	Monk	Background extra	1 episode
2003	NCIS	Background extra	1 episode
2003	Navy NCIS	Background extra	1 episode
2004	Entourage	Party girl	1 episode
2004	SummerSlam (2004)	Joy Giovanni	Television special
2004	Armageddon (2004)	Joy Giovanni	Television special
2004-2005	WWE Smackdown!	Joy Giovanni	Recurring role
2005	Royal Rumble (2005)	Joy Giovanni	Television special
2005	No Way Out (2005)	Joy Giovanni	Television special
2005	WrestleMania 21	Joy Giovanni	Television special
2005	SummerSlam (2005)	Joy Giovanni	Television special
2009	WrestleMania 25	Joy Giovanni	Television special
2018	NCIS: Los Angeles	Background extra	1 episode

Television as self
Year	Title	Role	Notes
2004	Lingerie Bowl	Self; Los Angeles Temptation	Television special
2004	WWE RAW Diva Search Casting Special	Self; contestant	Television special
2004	WWE $250,000 RAW Diva Search	Self; contestant	3rd place, 10 episodes
2005	Lingerie Bowl II	Self; Los Angeles Temptation	Television special
2005	WWE Hall of Fame 2005	Self; audience member	Television special
2005	Video Game Vixens	Self; celebrity judge	Television special
2009	Amy vs. Joy	Self; feature	Documentary
2009	WWE Hall of Fame 2009	Self; audience member	Television special
2009	WWE: The Best of Smackdown! - 10th Anniversary 1999-2009	Self; archive footage	Documentary
2011	E:60	Self; guest	1 episode
2012	Undertaker: The Streak 20-0	Self; archive footage	Documentary

Podcasts
Year	Title	Role	Notes
2021	My Big Break	Self; guest	1 episode
2021	Amy Weber Unleashed	Self; guest	1 episode
2023	The A2theK Wrestling Show	Self; guest	1 episode
2023	Rise to the Challenge Podcast	Self; guest	1 episode
2023	Ring The Belle	Self; guest	1 episode
2023	Cafe de René with René Duprée	Self; guest	1 episode
2023	The Geena The Latina Show	Self; guest	1 episode
2023-	Spirit Speakeasy	Self; host	
2024	Conversations with Rich Bennett	Self; guest	1 episode
2024	Financial Freedom Podcast with Dr. Christopher Loo	Self; guest	1 episode
2025	The Going North Podcast	Self; guest	1 episode

Music videos
Year	Title	Artist	Role
2006	Beast and the Harlot	Avenged Sevenfold	Stripper

Video games
Year	Title	Role	Notes
2005	WWE Smackdown! vs. RAW 2006	Joy Giovanni	Video game debut

== Awards and accomplishments ==
World Wrestling Entertainment

- WWE Rookie Diva of the Year Award (2005)
