= WrestleMania Goes Hollywood =

WrestleMania Goes Hollywood is a tagline and promotional name that has been used by WWE for their biggest professional wrestling event, WrestleMania, when held in the Greater Los Angeles area.

It may refer to:

- WrestleMania 21, a 2005 event.
- WrestleMania 39, a 2023 event.
