= Rochelle Loewen =

Canadian model and professional wrestler

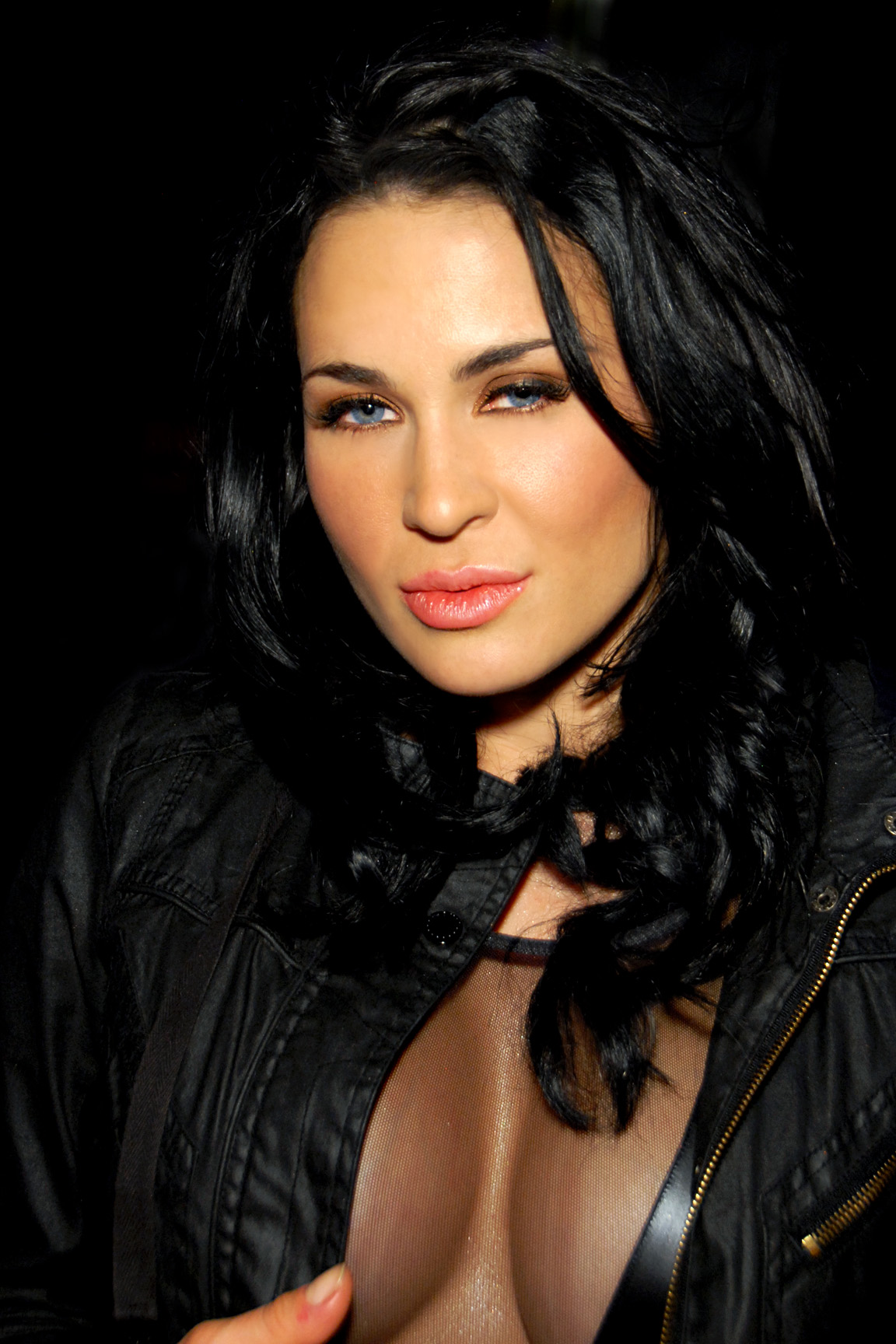
- Loewen in 2011

Personal information
- Born: Rochelle Nicole Loewen; October 26, 1979 (age 46) Edmonton, Alberta, Canada

Professional wrestling career
- Ring name: Rochelle Loewen
- Billed height: 5 ft 5 in (1.65 m)
- Billed weight: 120 lb (54 kg)
- Billed from: Edmonton, Alberta, Canada
- Debut: 2003
- Retired: 2005

Rochelle Nicole Loewen, born October 26, 1979, is a Canadian model, broadcaster and professional wrestling valet. Best known for her appearances in Playboy and for her time with the World Wrestling Entertainment (WWE).

== Modeling career ==
Loewen began modeling in her late teens, competing in Canada's Miss Hawaiian Tropic winning the 1999-2000 title. She featured on the cover of multiple magazines including Muscle & Fitness and Muscle & Fitness Hers.

Loewen posed for Playboy multiple times, she was the June 2004 Playboy Cybergirl of the Month and featured on two special edition covers of Playboy magazine, including the November 2002 Lingerie special. She competed in the 2004, 2005, 2006 and 2007 Lingerie Bowls for the Los Angeles Temptations. She posed for Bench Warmer trading cards for the 2003, 2004, 2005 and 2006 trading sets.

== Professional wrestling career ==
World Wrestling Entertainment (2003-2005)

In late 2003 Loewen began making regular appearances for the WWE on the RAW brand, as a ring-girl and in backstage segments. She briefly managed the tag team of Lance Storm and Val Venis, first accompanying them to the ring on the December 8, 2003 episode of RAW. She began appearing in backstage segments in 2004 as an aspiring Diva trying to get a job from RAW general manager Eric Bischoff. Shortly after Loewen was moved to the Smackdown! brand, due to reported backstage harassment from WWE superstar Randy Orton.

Her first appearance on the Smackdown! brand was in 2005, with Michelle McCool and WWE's newest Diva Lauren Jones in a backstage segment complimenting John Cena on his new title belt. The following Smackdown! Loewen, Jones and McCool accompanied Cena to the ring for his rap contest against Kenzo Suzuki. Loewen, Jones and McCool were involved in a short-lived feud against Suzuki's valet, Hiroko.

Loewen began being sporadically featured in backstage segments involving other Smackdown! divas such as; Amy Weber, Dawn Marie, Joy Giovanni, Michelle McCool, Miss Jackie, Sharmell and Torrie Wilson. At the 2005 No Way Out pay-per-view Loewen competed in the WWE 2005 Rookie Diva of the Year Contest, hosted by Dawn Marie and Torrie Wilson, alongside; Joy Giovanni, Lauren Jones and Michelle McCool, Giovanni won the competition with 65% of the fan votes. The three competitions included an evening gown contest, a talent contest in which she told jokes and a bikini contest. This marked one of Loewen's last appearances for the company before she was released a few weeks later. Loewen featured in the WWE direct to DVD WWE Viva Las Divas special.

== Broadcasting career ==
In 2006 Loewen completed the radio, television and broadcast news program at SAIT in Calgary. In 2011 she competed in the third season of Canadian reality show, Gillette Drafted making it to the finals before being eliminated as the judges questioned her sports knowledge.

== Personal life ==
As of 2008 she is self-employed as a personal trainer.

Loewen was a close friend of former WWE Diva Ashley Massaro, who died in 2019.

== Filmography ==
Film and television
Year	Title	Role	Notes
1997	Wild On...	Self; model	1 episode
2003	Playboy: The Ultimate Playmate Search	Self; playmate	TV special
2004	Playboy: Cybergirls	Self; cybergirl	2 episodes
2004	White Coats	Buxom nurse	
2005	WWE Viva Las Divas	Rochelle Loewen	Direct to DVD
2006	Hotel Erotica Cabo	Amy	1 episode
2011	Gillette Drafted season 3	Self; contestant	10 episodes
