= Lauren Jones =

American model and actress (born 1982)

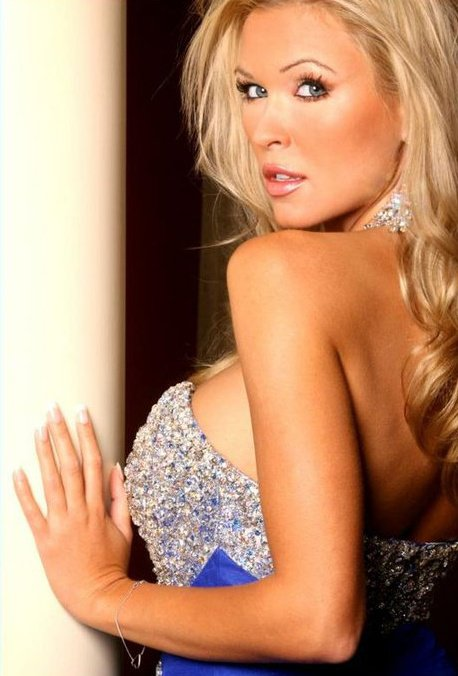
- Jones in 2013
- Born: Lauren Lorraine Jones; August 27, 1982 (age 44); Jackson, Mississippi, U.S.
- Occupations: Actress, Fashion designer, Model, Professional wrestler
- Website: laurenjones.net

Lauren Lorraine Jones (born August 27, 1982) is an American actress, model, fashion designer, broadcaster and former WWE Diva.

== Acting career ==
Jones has appeared in a number of film and television shows. Jones is featured in the film The Expendables, opposite Sylvester Stallone and Mickey Rourke, playing the role of Cheyenne, Mickey's love interest. She also played a role in Spider-Man 3. She has also been featured in many television series such as; Rescue Me, The Naked Brothers Band, Wonder Showzen and Guiding Light.

In 2007 Jones was the star of FOX's scripted reality series Anchorwoman which premiered on August 22, 2007. The show was cancelled from the network after two episodes aired back to back, the debut scored a 2.0 rating on fast nationals and was reported to have 2.7 million viewers overall.

== Modeling career ==
Jones has worked as a bikini and lingerie model, and has been featured on the cover of multiple magazines. She also participated in beauty pageants, becoming 2007 Miss Mississippi USA runner-up and becoming a finalist in Miss New York USA 2006. She was a Barker's Beauty on The Price is Right between 2006-2007.

She won the Miss MET-RX model search in 2007 and modeled in multiple advertisements for AXE Deodrant, Burger King and Coppertone Sunscreen.

She also starred in the 2007 Baywatch workout DVD series.

== Professional wrestling career ==
In late 2004 Jones began appearing for the WWE on the Smackdown! brand. She made her official debut in a backstage segment as the newest WWE Diva alongside Michelle McCool and Rochelle Loewen, complimenting John Cena on his new championship belt. The following week Jones, Loewen and McCool accompanied Cena to the ring for his rap battle against Kenzo Suzuki, she then entered a short feud with Suzuki's valet Hiroko. Jones began appearing in skits and in backstage segments, which were aired on UPN9 on episodes of Smackdown!. Jones became known for practicing her ring entrance. Jones competed in the 2005 No Way Out Smackdown! Rookie Diva of the Year Contest, hosted by Dawn Marie and Torrie Wilson, competing against Joy Giovanni, Michelle McCool and Rochelle Loewen. The contest included an evening gown contest, a talent contest in which Jones danced, and a bikini contest. Jones left the company shortly after. She was featured in the direct to DVD WWE Viva Las Divas special.

== Fashion design ==
Jones has her own eponymous footwear and evening bag collection, named after her first and middle name: Lauren Lorraine Shoes. She earned a BBA degree in design and management from Parsons School of Design in 2004. and then went on to attend law school. Her brand, Lauren Lorraine, began as bridal shoes and rapidly expanded after being picked up by major retailers, like Nordstrom and Belk, across the nation in 2009, expanding to also include luxury bags and other types of shoes. She and her brand were featured on the cover of GLAM week magazine in April 2025.

== Personal life ==
Jones briefly worked as a broadcaster at WJQS Radio Station, hosting her own radio show on 1400AM.

She currently maintains an active social media presence with over one million followers on her official Instagram page.

== Filmography ==
Film and television
Year	Title	Role	Notes
2000	Live with Kelly and Ryan	Self; model	1 episode
2000	Live with Regis and Kathy Lee	Self; model	1 episode
2002-2005	Last Call with Carson Daly	Improv actress	Recurring role, 27 episodes
2005	WWE Viva Las Divas	Lauren Jones	Direct to DVD
2005	Shooting Livien	Livien's Friend	
2005	The Naked Brothers Band: The Movie	Wrestler	
2005	Wonder Showzen	Bikini Model	
2005	Guiding Light	Friend #1	
2006	The CMT Music Awards 2006	Self	TV special
2006-2007	The Price is Right	Barker's Beauty	25 episodes
2007	Spider-Man 3	Reporter	
2007	The Naked Brothers Band	Double X	1 episode
2007	Anchorwoman	Lauren Jones	2 episodes, 6 unaired
2007	The Big Story	Self; guest	1 episode
2007	Good Day LA	Self; guest	1 episode
2007	The Best Damn Sports Show Period	Self; guest	1 episode
2007	Good Morning America	Self; guest	1 episode
2007	The O'Reilly Factor	Self; guest	1 episode
2007	Baywatch Beach Body Workout with Lauren Jones	Self; fitness instructor	Direct to DVD
2008	Rescue Me	Extra	1 episode
2010	The Expendables	Cheyenne	
2013	America Now	Self; guest	1 episode
