= No Way Out (2005) =

World Wrestling Entertainment pay-per-view event

- Promotional poster featuring John "Bradshaw" Layfield (JBL) and the top of the Barbed Wire Steel Cage
- Promotion: World Wrestling Entertainment
- Brand: SmackDown!
- Date: February 20, 2005
- City: Pittsburgh, Pennsylvania
- Venue: Mellon Arena
- Attendance: 9,500
- Buy rate: 240,000

Pay-per-view chronology
← Previous; Royal Rumble	Next → WrestleMania 21

No Way Out chronology
← Previous; 2004	Next → 2006

The 2005 No Way Out was a professional wrestling pay-per-view (PPV) event produced by World Wrestling Entertainment (WWE). It was the seventh No Way Out and took place on February 20, 2005, at the Mellon Arena in Pittsburgh, Pennsylvania, held exclusively for wrestlers from the promotion's SmackDown! brand division.

The main event featured a Barbed Wire Steel Cage match for the WWE Championship between reigning champion John "Bradshaw" Layfield (JBL) and Big Show, in which JBL won via escape. The predominant match on the undercard was Kurt Angle versus John Cena, where the winner received a WWE Championship match at WrestleMania 21, which was won by Cena.

== Production ==
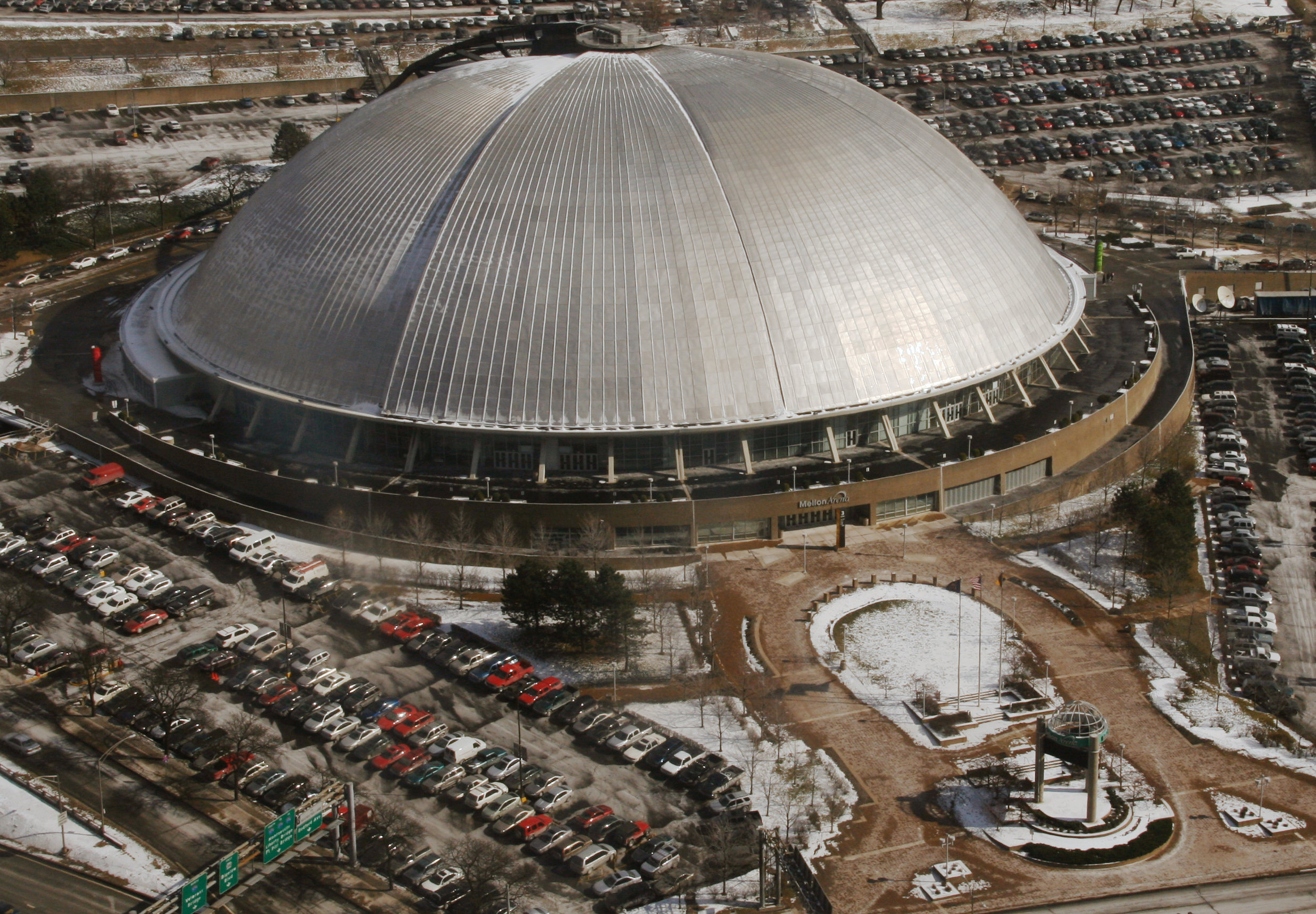
Mellon Arena, the then-home of the Pittsburgh Penguins, was the site of the seventh No Way Out pay-per-view event.

=== Background ===
No Way Out was a professional wrestling pay-per-view (PPV) event first held by World Wrestling Entertainment (WWE) as the 20th In Your House PPV event in February 1998. Following the discontinuation of the In Your House series in February 1999, No Way Out was reinstated in February 2000 as its own PPV event, thus establishing it as the annual February PPV for the promotion. The seventh event was held on February 20, 2005, at the Mellon Arena in Pittsburgh, Pennsylvania. Like the previous year's event, the 2005 event featured wrestlers exclusively from the SmackDown! brand.

=== Storylines ===
The main feud heading into No Way Out was between John "Bradshaw" Layfield (JBL) and Big Show. At the Royal Rumble, JBL defended his WWE Championship in a triple threat match against Kurt Angle and Big Show. During the bout, members from Team Angle (Luther Reigns and Mark Jindrak) and JBL's Cabinet (Orlando Jordan and the Basham Brothers) interfered, and eventually the Cabinet helped JBL retain his championship by pinning Angle. Later in the evening JBL entered the office of SmackDown! General manager Theodore Long, who immediately announced a Barbed Wire Steel Cage Match between JBL and Big Show for the WWE Championship at No Way Out. On the February 3 episode of SmackDown!, Big Show defeated the Basham Brothers in a handicap match. On the February 10 episode of SmackDown!, JBL and his cabinet attacked Big Show, and on the February 17 episode of SmackDown!, Big Show did the same thing to JBL and his cabinet.

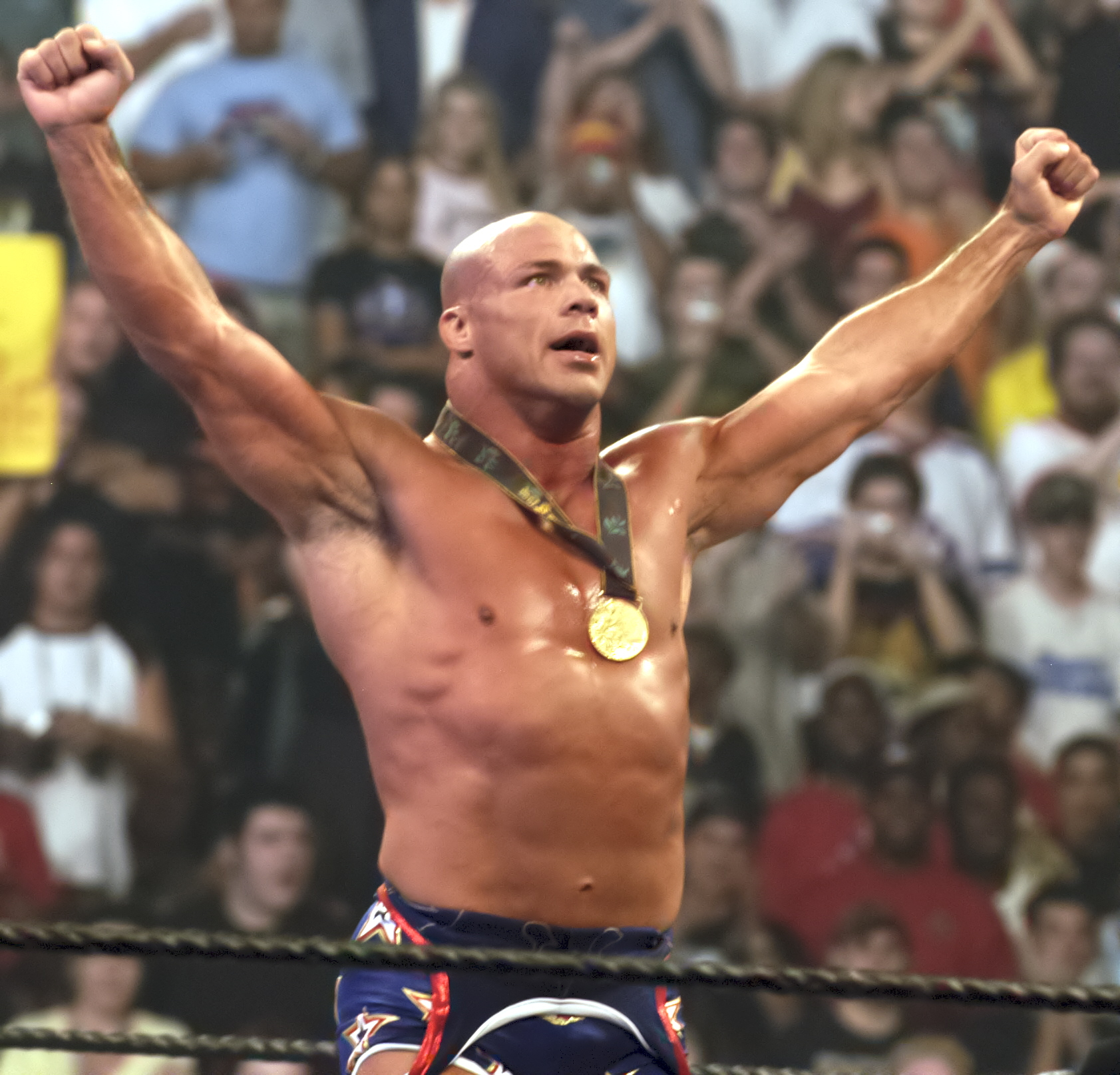
Kurt Angle, who lost to John Cena in the tournament to determine the number one contender for the WWE Championship at WrestleMania 21.

The main match on the undercard was the Number One Contender tournament final between John Cena and Kurt Angle. It was first announced by SmackDown! General Manager Theodore Long on the February 3 episode of SmackDown!, and he booked some of the first-round matches for that night. The winner of the tournament would earn a main event spot challenging for the WWE Championship at WrestleMania 21. The first match of the tournament was The Undertaker versus Rene Dupree. The match ended in a double countout due to Luther Reigns preventing The Undertaker from re-entering the ring. He did this at the request of Angle, who was scheduled to face the winner of that match if Angle won his. The double countout meant that neither man advanced in the tournament, thereby giving a bye in the semi-finals to the winner of the other qualifying match. The next first round match was Eddie Guerrero against Booker T. Booker T won the match by pinfall, even after Guerrero had faked a knee injury to try to gain the advantage. On the February 10 episode of SmackDown!, the next first-round match in the tournament occurred between Cena and Orlando Jordan, which Cena won. The next match was Angle against Rey Mysterio, which Angle won by forcing Mysterio to submit by using his Ankle Lock. Due to this win and the double countout the week before, Angle received a bye into the finals of the tournament. On the February 17 episode of SmackDown!, Cena had his semi-final against Booker T, which he won after an FU. Cena and Angle advanced to No Way Out in the final match of the tournament.

The other main match on the undercard was The Undertaker versus Luther Reigns. The match was made after Reigns interfered in The Undertaker's match during the Number One Contenders tournament on the February 3 episode of SmackDown!. This interference cost The Undertaker his match, and his opportunity to challenge for the WWE Championship at WrestleMania. On the February 10 episode of SmackDown!, Reigns cut a promo on The Undertaker, and claimed that he wasn't scared of him. On the February 17 episode of SmackDown!, The Undertaker faced Reigns' tag team partner Mark Jindrak, immediately after Reigns had defeated Nunzio and cut another promo on The Undertaker. The Undertaker pinned Jindrak after a Chokeslam and a Tombstone Piledriver. Reigns then hit The Undertaker with a television camera. The Undertaker, however, quickly recovered, sat up in the ring, and then stalked Reigns to the backstage area.

== Event ==
Other on-screen personnel
Role:	Name:
English commentators	Michael Cole
English commentators	Tazz
English commentators	Torrie Wilson (SmackDown! Rookie of the Year contest)
English commentators	Dawn Marie (SmackDown! Rookie of the Year contest)
Spanish commentators	Carlos Cabrera
Spanish commentators	Hugo Savinovich
Ring announcer	Tony Chimel
Referees	Nick Patrick
Referees	Charles Robinson
Referees	Brian Hebner
Referees	Jimmy Korderas
General manager	Theodore Long
Pre-show hosts (Sunday Night Heat)	Todd Grisham
Pre-show hosts (Sunday Night Heat)	Ivory
Pre-show hosts (Sunday Night Heat)	Steve Romero
Pre-show hosts (Sunday Night Heat)	Josh Matthews

Before the event went live on pay-per-view, Hardcore Holly and Charlie Haas defeated Kenzo Suzuki and René Duprée, with Hiroko, in a match taped for Heat. The match ended after Holly performed an Alabama Slam on Suzuki for the win. The first match that aired on pay-per-view was the WWE Tag Team Championship match between The Basham Brothers, Doug and Danny, and the challengers, Eddie Guerrero and Rey Mysterio. The Basham Brothers were in control of the match until Mysterio performed a moonsault. He tagged Guerrero, who hit Doug with a title belt whilst the referee was distracted. After a 619 from Mysterio, Guerrero pinned Doug to win the title.

The second match was between Heidenreich and Booker T. Heidenreich dominated Booker T for the entire match. Heidenreich was disqualified after hitting Booker T with a Steel chair. After the match, Heidenreich attempted to pin Booker T.

The next match was the Cruiserweight Open for the WWE Cruiserweight Championship. The first two competitors were the defending champion, Funaki and Paul London. London pinned Funaki with the help of Spike Dudley, who entered early. With the help of the eliminated Funaki, London pinned Dudley. The next participant was Shannon Moore, who missed a Corkscrew Moonsault, allowing London to perform a 450° splash to eliminate him. The fifth entrant was Akio, who was eliminated by countout. The final participant was Chavo Guerrero Jr. Guerrero took control of the match, and when London tried to perform a roll-up, Guerrero pinned London using the ropes to win the title.

The fourth match was The Undertaker versus Luther Reigns. Mark Jindrak accompanied Reigns to the ring but was ejected before the match started. Reigns hit The Undertaker with the ring bell and applied various submission holds. The Undertaker countered with a Tombstone piledriver to win the match.

The fifth match was the final of the tournament to determine the #1 contender for the WWE Championship between Kurt Angle and John Cena. Angle performed a German Suplex into the turnbuckles to gain control. Angle applied the Ankle Lock but Cena escaped, and executed an FU for a near-fall. Angle applied another Ankle Lock but Cena reached the ropes. Angle continued to dominate until the referee was knocked down. Angle attempted to hit Cena with his steel chain but Cena countered with another FU to earn a title match at WrestleMania 21.

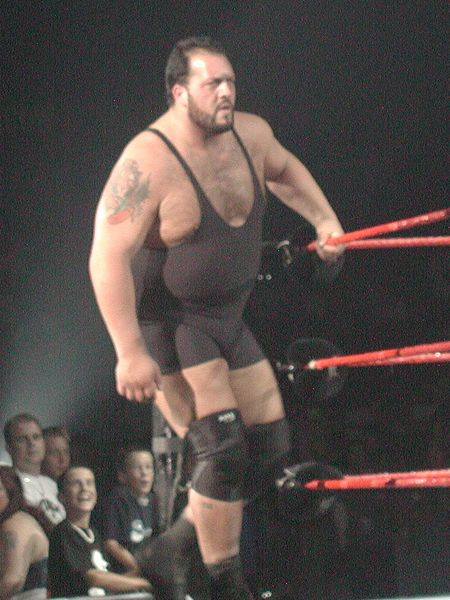
Big Show challenged for the WWE Championship.

Immediately before the main event, the third event in the 2005 Rookie Diva of the Year competition took place. The participants were Michelle McCool, Joy Giovanni, Lauren Jones, and Rochelle Loewen, and the segments were hosted by Torrie Wilson and Dawn Marie. The first event was an "evening gown" competition, which took place after the WWE Tag Team Championship match. The next event was the "Talent Contest", and the final one was the "Swimsuit Competition". The eventual winner was Giovanni, with 65% of the online votes that took place throughout the show.

The main event was the Barbed Wire Steel Cage match for the WWE Championship between John "Bradshaw" Layfield (JBL) and Big Show. JBL took the early advantage in the match and tried to climb the cage to escape but was stopped by the barbed wire. He then sent Big Show into the cage, causing him to bleed. Big Show took control, prompting JBL's Cabinet to interfere. Orlando Jordan attempted to climb the cage as the Basham Brothers used a pair of bolt cutters to cut a small hole in the cage. General manager Theodore Long ejected the Cabinet from ringside but Jordan passed the bolt cutters through the cage to JBL. JBL used them to hit Big Show with for a near-fall. Big Show performed a chokeslam from the top rope, sending JBL through the ring. Big Show broke through the cage door but JBL had escaped, meaning JBL retained the title. Big Show then attacked JBL after the match until the Cabinet intervened. They attacked Big Show until Batista made the save and John Cena attacked JBL.

== Aftermath ==
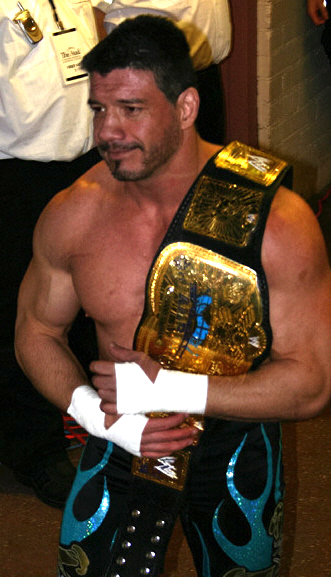
Eddie Guerrero as one half of the WWE Tag Team Champions.

On the following episode of SmackDown!, Eddie Guerrero and Rey Mysterio successfully defended the WWE Tag Team Championship against the former champions, the Basham Brothers. They continued to defend the titles against other teams, including Mark Jindrak and Luther Reigns, John "Bradshaw" Layfield (JBL) and Orlando Jordan, and Hardcore Holly and Charlie Haas. Guerrero, however, challenged Mysterio to a match at WrestleMania 21, to find out who was the better wrestler, which Mysterio accepted. The following week, on SmackDown!, Guerrero faced Danny Basham, but Mysterio accidentally cost him the match. Later that night, Guerrero cost Mysterio his match against Doug Basham. At WrestleMania, Mysterio defeated Guerrero. Mysterio and Guerrero lost the tag titles on April 21, to MNM, after Mysterio was pinned while Guerrero was distracted by MNM's manager, Melina.

Booker T and Heidenreich continued their feud, and they had a rematch a few weeks later on SmackDown!. Heidenreich won by Disqualification after Booker T performed a DDT onto a steel chair. The following week, in a no-disqualification match, Booker T won after a chairshot. Booker T then moved on to a feud with Reigns, and was accompanied by his new wife, Sharmell. Reigns had fallen out with his tag team partner, Jindrak, just a few weeks prior, setting up matches between them.

On the February 24 episode of SmackDown!, Chavo Guerrero successfully defended his WWE Cruiserweight Championship against Funaki. After the match, Paul London attacked Guerrero. On a later episode of Velocity, London defeated Akio to become the Number One Contender for the Cruiserweight title. The following week, London defeated Billy Kidman. On March 31, London became the new Cruiserweight Champion after winning a Cruiserweight Battle Royal.

Randy Orton challenged The Undertaker to a match at WrestleMania on an episode of Raw. Orton had been inspired by Superstar Billy Graham, who encouraged him to "go where no wrestler has gone before". On the next episode of SmackDown!, the Undertaker accepted his challenge. On March 17, a contract signing for the match was scheduled to take place, and was attended by the SmackDown! General manager, Theodore Long, and Raw General Manager, Eric Bischoff. The Undertaker immediately signed the contract; however, before Orton signed the contract, he cut a promo on the Undertaker, and then slapped the Undertaker. Orton fled the ring after the Undertaker began to fill the arena with smoke, and didn't sign the contract. Orton taunted the Undertaker for the next few weeks, but the Undertaker responded with taunts of his own, and he attacked other superstars. On the final SmackDown! before WrestleMania, Orton's father, "Cowboy" Bob Orton, begged the Undertaker to have mercy on Orton. It ultimately proved to be a set-up, however, as Orton attacked the Undertaker and performed an RKO on him. At WrestleMania, "Cowboy" Bob interfered in Orton's match, but was unsuccessful when the Undertaker pinned Orton after a Tombstone piledriver.

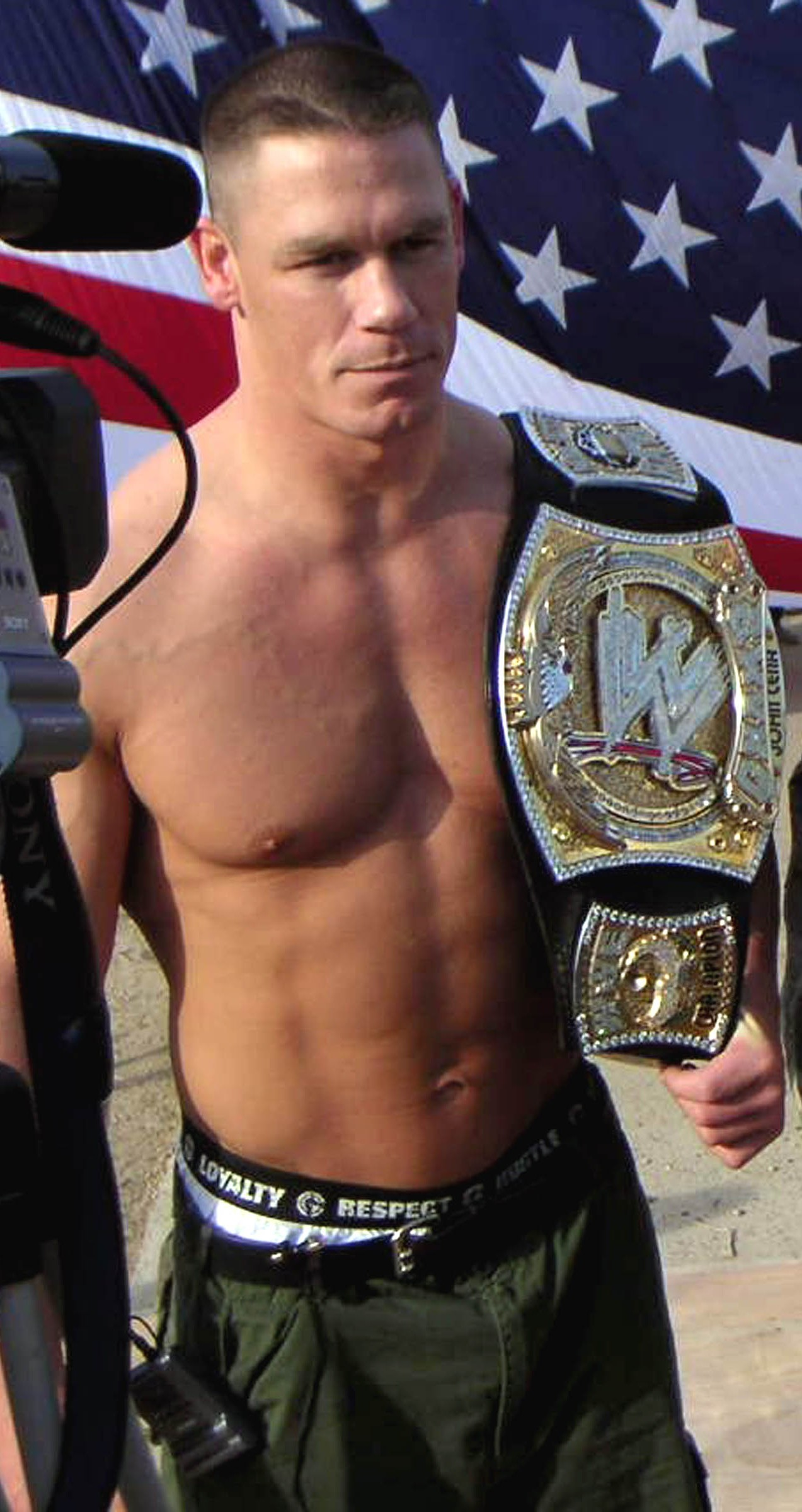
John Cena with his customized WWE Championship "spinner belt", which he introduced after winning the title at WrestleMania 21.

Kurt Angle entered into a feud with Shawn Michaels, with the pair fighting over who was the better wrestler in WWE. This feud had begun at the Royal Rumble, where Michaels had eliminated Angle. Angle then returned to the ring, and eliminated Michaels, before attacking him. A few weeks later, Michaels challenged Angle to a match at WrestleMania. On February 28, Angle appeared on Raw, attacking Michaels, and accepting his challenge. On the next episode of SmackDown!, Michaels ambushed Angle in the ring, and the two of them brawled, until security broke it up. Angle claimed that he was better than Michaels, and said he would prove it by achieving everything that Michaels had, but doing it faster. He then won a ladder match, mocking Michaels match from WrestleMania X. He then challenged Marty Jannetty, Michaels former tag team partner to a match. He won after Jannetty tapped out. Angle also persuaded Michaels' former manager, Sensational Sherri to do a spoof of Michaels' theme song, "Sexy Boy", calling his version "Sexy Kurt". Michaels, however, interrupted and played a video highlighting all his accomplishments. When Sherri got emotional from watching the video, Angle put her in the Ankle Lock. Angle also interfered in Michaels' matches on Raw. At WrestleMania, Angle won by making Michaels submit to his Ankle Lock.

John "Bradshaw" Layfield (JBL) went on to face John Cena at WrestleMania. On the SmackDown! after No Way Out, Cena and Big Show defeated JBL and Orlando Jordan. The following week, JBL cut a promo and Cena, and insulted him, while Cena defended his United States title against Jordan. Jordan won the title after the Basham Brothers distracted the referee, and JBL hit Cena with the WWE Championship belt. They then blew up Cena's customized design of the United States Championship, and replaced it with the original one. Later that night, Cena attacked the General Manager, Long, and was thrown out of the arena. During JBL's match that night, Cena returned and attacked JBL's cabinet. The next week, Long announced that if Cena laid a hand on JBL, apart from in matches, he would lose his WrestleMania match. In a six-person tag team match that night, Cena's team won, but Cena had to stop himself from attacking JBL after the bell had rung. On a later episode of SmackDown!, Long clarifies that if JBL physically provoked Cena, then Cena could retaliate. Cena then attempted to provoke JBL, by vandalising his limousine, and spray painting "FU" on JBL's shirt. On the last SmackDown! before WrestleMania, however, JBL had Cena arrested for vandalism and, once Cena was handcuffed, attacked him. At WrestleMania, Cena pinned JBL after an FU, to win the WWE Championship for the first time.

== Results ==
No.	Results	Stipulations	Times
1^{H}	Charlie Haas and Hardcore Holly defeated Kenzo Suzuki and René Duprée (with Hiroko)	Tag team match	7:36
2	Eddie Guerrero and Rey Mysterio defeated The Basham Brothers (Danny Basham and Doug Basham) (c)	Tag team match for the WWE Tag Team Championship	14:51
3	Booker T defeated Heidenreich by disqualification	Singles match	6:48
4	Chavo Guerrero defeated Funaki (c), Akio, Paul London, Shannon Moore and Spike Dudley	Cruiserweight Open for the WWE Cruiserweight Championship	9:47
5	The Undertaker defeated Luther Reigns	Singles match	11:44
6	John Cena defeated Kurt Angle	Tournament final match to determine the #1 contender for the WWE Championship at WrestleMania 21	19:21
7	John "Bradshaw" Layfield (c) defeated Big Show by escaping the cage	Barbed Wire Steel Cage match for the WWE Championship	15:11
(c) / – the champion(s) heading into the match; H / – the match was broadcast prior to the pay-per-view on Sunday Night Heat

=== WWE Championship #1 Contender's Tournament bracket ===
1st Round; SmackDown; January 31 – February 5, 2005 (Aired: February 3–10)
Booker T	Pinfall
Eddie Guerrero	19:55
Orlando Jordan	5:01
John Cena	Pinfall
The Undertaker	Countout (12:19)
René Duprée	Countout (12:19)
Rey Mysterio	17:13
Kurt Angle	Submission

Semifinals; SmackDown; February 15, 2005 (Aired: February 17)
Booker T	16:45
John Cena	Pinfall
N/A	—
Kurt Angle	Bye

Final; No Way Out; February 20, 2005
John Cena	Pinfall
Kurt Angle	19:25
