= Intern Academy =

- DVD cover bearing the title White Coats
- Directed by: Dave Thomas
- Written by: Dave Thomas
- Produced by: Josh Miller
- Starring: Dave Thomas; Carly Pope; Dave Foley; Dan Aykroyd; Jane McLean; Lynda Boyd
- Cinematography: John Spooner
- Edited by: Doug Forbes
- Production companies: Minds Eye Pictures; Maple & Palm Productions
- Distributed by: TVA Films (Canada); First Look International (United States)
- Release date: September 10, 2004
- Running time: 90 minutes
- Country: Canada
- Language: English

Intern Academy is a 2004 Canadian comedy film written and directed by Dave Thomas. It has several alternative titles including working titles An Intern's Diary, Whitecoats and Interns. In Canada, its English title is Intern Academy, while its French title is Médecin en herbe. The US DVD title is White Coats. Its Italian title is "L'ospedale piu' sexy del mondo," literally "The Sexiest Hospital in the World".

== Plot ==
The story follows a group of interns and nurses working at St. Albert's, the worst teaching hospital in Canada, as they try to deal with work and relationship stress.

Run by administrator Dr. Cyrill Kipp, the hospital only manages to stay open because Kipp sells the hospital's equipment on the black market.

During on-the-job training headed by Dr. Omar Olson, interns brave blood, vomit and exploding colostomy bags. The students include the clumsy Mike Bonnert, whose parents Sam and Susan are prominent physicians and forced him to study in medical school; his girlfriend Mitzi Cole, who works as a stripper to pay her way through school; Dale Dodd, who has come to the hospital to meet women and falls in love with nurse Cynthia Skyes; Marlon Thomas, who likes to play pranks with his mates; Mira Towers, who aims to be a great surgeon; and the innocent Christine Lee, a very efficient student and promising doctor who loses her inhibitions when intoxicated.

After Mike discovers that Mitzi became sexually active with Dale, he, Dale, and Marlon begin to fight in the morgue, using human organs as weapons, but are caught and expelled from St. Albert's. However, when a 76-car pile up occurs, they return to ER to help the patients. One patient, who was saved in an emergency surgery, was a billionaire, and saves the hospital from going bankrupt.

== Cast ==
- Peter Oldring as Mike Bonnert
- Pat Kelly as Dale Dodd
- Viv Leacock as Marlon Thomas
- Ingrid Kavelaars as Mira Towers
- Jane McLean as Christine Lee
- Christine Chatelain as Mitzi Cole
- Lynda Boyd as Cynthia Skyes
- Carly Pope as Sarah Calder
- Dave Foley as Dr. Denton Whiteside
- Dave Thomas as Dr. Omar Olson
- Dan Aykroyd as Dr. Cyrill Kipp
- Maury Chaykin as Dr. Roger Anthony 'Tony' Toussant
- Matt Frewer as Dr. Anton Keller
- Saul Rubinek as Dr. Sam Bonnert
- Sue Huff as Dr. Susan Bonnert
- Rochelle Loewen as Buxom Nurse

== Home media ==
The region 1 DVD was released July 25, 2006 and the region 2 DVD was released May 28, 2007.

== See also ==
- Inglewood, Edmonton#Charles Camsell Hospital
