= WrestleMania 21 =

2005 World Wrestling Entertainment pay-per-view event

- Promotional poster featuring the Staples Center
- Promotion: World Wrestling Entertainment
- Brand(s): Raw; SmackDown!
- Date: April 3, 2005
- City: Los Angeles, California
- Venue: Staples Center
- Attendance: 20,193
- Buy rate: 1,090,000
- Tagline: WrestleMania Goes Hollywood

Pay-per-view chronology
← Previous; No Way Out	Next → Backlash

WrestleMania chronology
← Previous; XX	Next → 22

WrestleMania 21, also promoted as WrestleMania Goes Hollywood, was a 2005 professional wrestling pay-per-view (PPV) event produced by World Wrestling Entertainment (WWE). It was the 21st annual WrestleMania and took place on April 3, 2005, at the Staples Center in Los Angeles, California, held for wrestlers from the promotion's Raw and SmackDown! brand divisions.

The main event of the show, which was the main match from the Raw brand, saw Batista challenge Triple H for the World Heavyweight Championship, which Batista won by pinfall after executing a Batista Bomb. The main match on the SmackDown! brand, which was the event's penultimate match, saw John "Bradshaw" Layfield (JBL) defend the WWE Championship against John Cena, which Cena won by pinfall after performing an FU, marking the first of Cena's record-setting 17 WWE world title reigns.

The undercard featured the first-ever Money in the Bank ladder match, where Edge defeated Chris Benoit, Chris Jericho, Christian, Kane, and Shelton Benjamin, as well as two inter-promotional matches where SmackDown!'s The Undertaker defeated Raw's Randy Orton and SmackDown!'s Kurt Angle defeated Raw's Shawn Michaels. The event also featured the return of "Stone Cold" Steve Austin, who then started his part-time appearances with WWE and also the final WrestleMania event that Eddie Guerrero competed in, going against his tag team partner Rey Mysterio, which Mysterio won; Guerrero died of heart failure in November later that year.

WrestleMania 21 was the first WrestleMania held at Staples Center, but the fifth to take place in the Los Angeles metropolitan area, after WrestleMania 2 in 1986, WrestleMania VII in 1991, WrestleMania XII in 1996, and WrestleMania 2000. Tickets sold out in less than one minute for the event, making it the fastest ticket sell-out in the company's history at the time as well as the fastest ticket sell-out at Staples Center. The event drew a Staples Center record attendance of 20,193 people from 37 countries and 50 states and grossed more than $7.1 million in ticket sales, making it the highest grossing WWE event ever at Staples Center. In addition to those in attendance, the event was seen by millions of fans in more than 190 countries.

== Production ==
=== Background ===
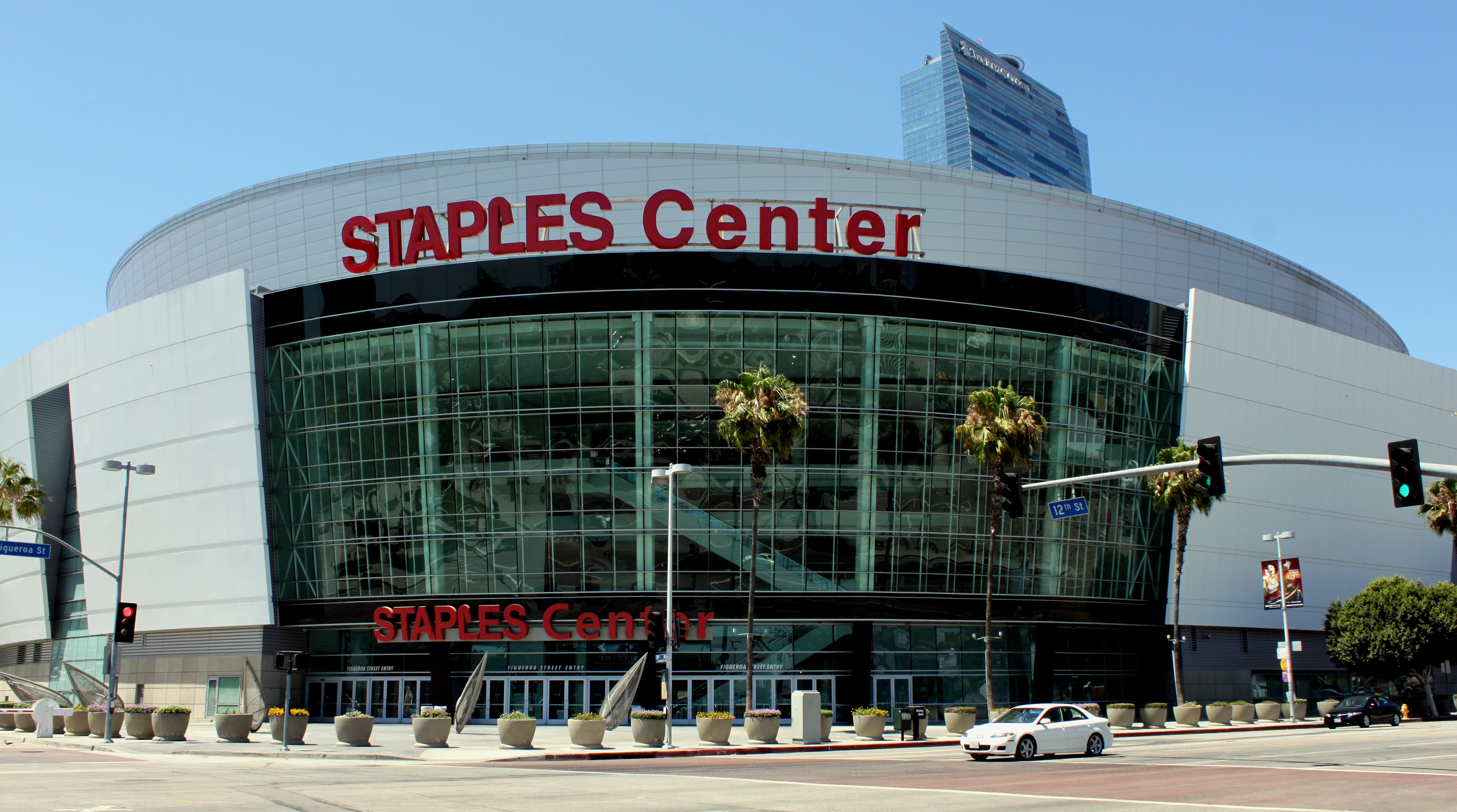
The event was held at the Staples Center in Los Angeles, California.

WrestleMania is considered World Wrestling Entertainment's (WWE) flagship professional wrestling pay-per-view (PPV) event, having first been held in 1985. It has become the longest-running professional wrestling event in history and is held annually between mid-March to mid-April. It was the first of WWE's original four pay-per-views, which includes Royal Rumble, SummerSlam, and Survivor Series, referred to as the "Big Four". WrestleMania 21 was scheduled to be held on April 3, 2005, at Staples Center in Los Angeles, California, and featured wrestlers from the Raw and SmackDown! brands. It was the first WrestleMania held at Staples Center, but the fifth to take place in the Los Angeles metropolitan area, after WrestleMania 2 in 1986, WrestleMania VII in 1991, WrestleMania XII in 1996, and WrestleMania 2000.

In line with the event's location and tagline, WrestleMania 21 was promoted on television with a series of parody movie trailers with WWE talent playing the starring roles from famous movies.

The parody movie trailers included:

- Forrest Gump featuring Eugene playing the role of Tom Hanks, with William Regal making a cameo appearance.
- Braveheart featuring Triple H playing the role of Mel Gibson, with Ric Flair making a cameo appearance.
- Basic Instinct featuring Stacy Keibler playing the role of Sharon Stone, along with Chris Benoit, Chris Jericho, and Christian playing the roles of the interrogators, with The Fabulous Moolah and Mae Young making a cameo appearance.
- Pulp Fiction featuring Eddie Guerrero and Booker T playing the roles of John Travolta and Samuel L. Jackson.
- A Few Good Men featuring John Cena and John "Bradshaw" Layfield playing the roles of Tom Cruise and Jack Nicholson, with Jonathan Coachman making a cameo appearance.
- Dirty Harry featuring The Undertaker playing the role of Clint Eastwood.
- When Harry Met Sally... featuring Kurt Angle and Christy Hemme playing the roles of Billy Crystal and Meg Ryan, with Linda McMahon making a cameo appearance.
- Taxi Driver featuring Heidenreich, Batista, Shawn Michaels, Rey Mysterio Jr., Shelton Benjamin, Doug Basham, Danny Basham, Big Show, Candice Michelle, Carlito, Tajiri, Orlando Jordan, Joy Giovanni, Gene Snitsky, Paul London, Tazz, Chavo Guerrero Jr., Hardcore Holly, Molly Holly, and Michael Cole, performing their unique versions of Robert De Niro's "You talkin' to me?" line.
- Gladiator with "Stone Cold" Steve Austin playing the role of Russell Crowe, airing as part of the opening video for the event.

Celebrity guests in attendance for WrestleMania 21 included David Arquette, Motörhead, Adam Sandler, Rob Schneider, Billy Gibbons from ZZ Top, The Black Eyed Peas, Billy Corgan from The Smashing Pumpkins, Anthony Kiedis from Red Hot Chili Peppers, Ice Cube, Carmen Electra, Sylvester Stallone, Marg Helgenberger, Matt Groening, Rick Rubin, Will Sasso, and Macaulay Culkin.

=== Storylines ===
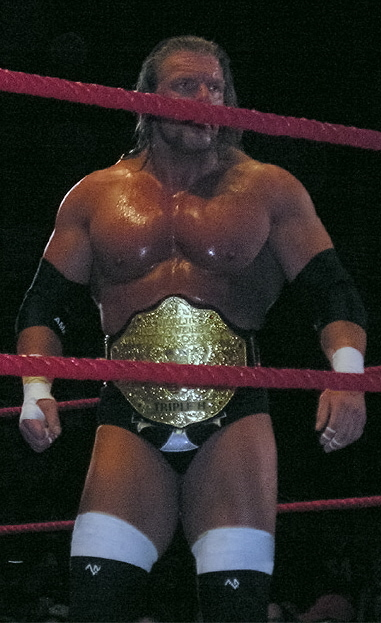
Triple H as Raw's World Heavyweight Champion.

At New Year's Revolution on January 9, Triple H won an Elimination Chamber match to win the vacant World Heavyweight Championship by last eliminating Randy Orton following outside interference from Evolution members Batista and Ric Flair. Three weeks later at the Royal Rumble, Triple H successfully defended the title against Orton while Batista won the Royal Rumble match, earning the right to compete in the main event of WrestleMania 21 against the champion of his choice. On the February 7 episode of Raw, Triple H defeated Edge to retain the World Heavyweight Championship due to Batista's interference. Afterward, as Batista raised Triple H's hand and his championship, Batista got a close look at the World Heavyweight Championship, then stared Triple H down, looking as if he was thinking about challenging Triple H for the title. In an attempt to persuade Batista to challenge WWE Champion John "Bradshaw" Layfield (JBL) rather than him at WrestleMania, Triple H concocted a scheme to have Batista run over by a limousine resembling the one used by JBL. Initially, Batista did not want help from Evolution and wanted to confront JBL by himself. Triple H insisted that Evolution accompany Batista anyway, saving him from the oncoming limousine. Batista became aware of the plot while eavesdropping on his fellow Evolution members and signed a contract guaranteeing him a match with Triple H at WrestleMania, thus leaving Evolution and officially turning him face. Batista pretended to sign with the SmackDown! brand, giving Triple H and Flair the "thumbs up", but turned it into a "thumbs down" (alluding to the way Randy Orton was kicked out of Evolution after becoming World Heavyweight Champion at SummerSlam in August 2004) before attacking the pair. This led to Batista's departure from the stable.

At No Way Out, John Cena defeated Kurt Angle to earn a spot in the SmackDown! main event at WrestleMania. During the latter event, John "Bradshaw" Layfield (JBL) successfully defended the WWE Championship against the Big Show in a Barbed Wire Steel Cage Match. As a result of Cena's win, he began a feud with JBL and his Cabinet. On the February 24 episode of SmackDown!, JBL was hosting a party as a celebration in honor of his win. Before the party could get started, however, Big Show came out and interrupted the celebration and attacked JBL and the Cabinet. Soon after, Cena came down and smashed the portrait over JBL's head. Later that night, Cena and Big Show defeated JBL and Orlando Jordan. The following week, JBL cut a promo on Cena, and insulted him, while Cena defended his WWE United States Championship against Jordan. Jordan won the match and the United States Championship after the Basham Brothers distracted the referee, and JBL hit Cena with the WWE Championship belt. JBL then destroyed Cena's customized United States Championship belt and replaced it with the original one. Later that night, Cena brought a steel lead pipe to the ring with him and ordered JBL to come out to the ring and fight him, only to have the SmackDown! General Manager, Theodore Long make his way to the ring and inform Cena that he had to wait until WrestleMania to get his hands on JBL. Cena then gave the ultimatum for Long to be part of a solution or part of the problem. Cena then stated, "Since you're not going to bring JBL out here, then you're part of the problem." Cena then nailed Long with an FU and was thrown out of the arena. During JBL's match that night, Cena returned and attacked The Cabinet. The next week, Long announced that if Cena laid a hand on JBL, apart from in matches, he would lose his WrestleMania match. In a six-man tag team match that night, Cena and the WWE Tag Team Champions, Eddie Guerrero and Rey Mysterio defeated JBL and the Basham Brothers, but Cena had to stop himself from attacking JBL after the bell had rung. On the March 24 edition of SmackDown!, Long clarified that if JBL physically provoked Cena, then Cena could retaliate. Cena then attempted to provoke JBL, by vandalizing his limousine, cutting off his tie, pouring water into his hat and spray painting "FU" on his shirt. He also said to JBL "You throw a punch and I swear I will knock the hell out of you" which JBL didn't make a move on Cena. On the last SmackDown! before WrestleMania, however, JBL interrupted Cena's match against Carlito and had Cena arrested for vandalizing his limousine. Once Cena was handcuffed, JBL nailed him with a low blow and ended the show by mocking Cena with his signature "you can't see me" taunt.

At the Royal Rumble, two months before WrestleMania, SmackDown! superstar Kurt Angle relentlessly attacked Raw superstar Shawn Michaels after Michaels had eliminated him from the Royal Rumble match. The next month at No Way Out, Angle lost a number one contenders match to John Cena, losing a spot in the SmackDown! main event at WrestleMania. The next night on Raw, Michaels told SmackDown! General Manager Theodore Long to inform Angle that he had challenged him to a match at WrestleMania. On the February 28 edition of Raw, after Michaels defeated Edge in a Street Fight, Angle attacked Michaels and accepted his challenge. On the next episode of SmackDown!, Michaels ambushed Angle in the ring, and the two of them brawled, until security broke it up. Angle claimed that he was better than Michaels, and said he would prove it by achieving everything that Michaels had, but doing it faster. He then won a ladder match, mocking Michaels' match from WrestleMania X. He then challenged Marty Jannetty, Michaels former tag team partner to a match. He won after Jannetty tapped out. Angle also persuaded Michaels' former manager, Sensational Sherri to do a spoof of Michaels' theme song, "Sexy Boy", calling his version "Sexy Kurt". Michaels, however, interrupted and played a video highlighting all his accomplishments. When Sherri got emotional from watching the video, Angle put her in the Ankle Lock. Angle also interfered in Michaels' match against Muhammad Hassan on the last edition of Raw before the pay-per-view, which resulted in Michaels defeating Hassan by disqualification.

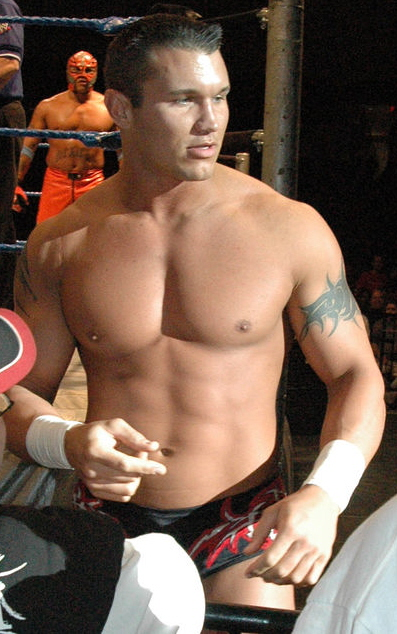
Randy Orton, who faced off against The Undertaker.

The other interpromotional match on the card was between Randy Orton and The Undertaker, with Orton representing Raw and Undertaker representing SmackDown!. The feud first started on the March 7 episode of Raw when Orton challenged Undertaker to a match at WrestleMania billed as "Legend vs. Legend Killer" match. Orton had been inspired by Superstar Billy Graham, who encouraged him to "go where no wrestler has gone before". Three days later on SmackDown!, Undertaker accepted Orton's challenge. On the March 14 episode of Raw, during Chris Jericho's "Highlight Reel" segment, Jake "The Snake" Roberts, attempted to give Orton advice about his match with Undertaker at WrestleMania, but received an RKO by Orton when Orton was not cooperating. On March 17, a contract signing for the match was scheduled to take place, and was attended by the SmackDown! General Manager, Theodore Long, and Raw General Manager, Eric Bischoff. The Undertaker immediately signed the contract; however, before Orton signed the contract, he cut a promo on the Undertaker, stating that he has nothing but respect for him and then claimed that the legend of the Undertaker will become a myth when his 12–0 undefeated streak at WrestleMania, would soon be 12–1. Afterwards, he then slapped the Undertaker. Orton fled the ring after the Undertaker began to fill the arena with smoke, and didn't sign the contract. The next week on Raw, Orton claimed that his confidence was at an all-time high, despite what happened on SmackDown! the week before. Shortly thereafter, Orton turned heel and furthered his Legend Killer gimmick by performing an RKO on Stacy Keibler, who was his girlfriend at the time. Orton taunted the Undertaker for the next couple weeks, but the Undertaker responded with taunts of his own, as he attacked other superstars. On the final SmackDown! before WrestleMania, Orton's father, "Cowboy" Bob Orton, begged the Undertaker to have mercy on Orton. It ultimately proved to be a set-up, however, as Orton attacked the Undertaker and performed an RKO on him just to show an example of what could happen at WrestleMania when he faces the Undertaker.

Another match on the card was the Money in the Bank ladder match between Chris Jericho, Christian, Chris Benoit, Edge, Kane, and Shelton Benjamin. The idea for the Money in the Bank match was introduced by Jericho who proposed a six-man ladder match, for the event in which the winner would receive a contract for a World title match at the place and time of his choosing. Raw General Manager, Eric Bischoff, booked the match at WrestleMania 21 soon after. According to Jericho, the first idea was a submission match between Edge, Jericho, and Benoit and a ladder match between the other wrestlers.

== Event ==
Other on-screen personnel
Role:	Name:
English commentators	Jim Ross (Raw)
English commentators	Jerry Lawler (Raw)
English commentators	Michael Cole (SmackDown!)
English commentators	Tazz (SmackDown!)
Spanish commentators	Carlos Cabrera
Spanish commentators	Hugo Savinovich
Ring announcers	Tony Chimel (SmackDown!)
Ring announcers	Howard Finkel (Raw)
Referees	Nick Patrick (SmackDown!)
Referees	Jim Korderas (SmackDown!)
Referees	Brian Hebner (SmackDown!)
Referees	Chad Patton (Raw)
Referees	Earl Hebner (Raw)
Referees	Mike Chioda (Raw)
Referees	Jack Doan (Raw)

=== Pre-show ===
Before the event went live on pay-per-view, a dark match was held. It was exclusive on DVD releases, not on Sunday Night Heat. A 30-man interpromotional Battle Royal, which featured: Booker T, Paul London, Heidenreich, Spike Dudley, Nunzio, Funaki, Doug Basham, Danny Basham, Orlando Jordan, Mark Jindrak, Luther Reigns, Scotty 2 Hotty, Hardcore Holly, Charlie Haas, Billy Kidman, and Akio from SmackDown and Simon Dean, William Regal, Tajiri, Rob Conway, Sylvain Grenier, Snitsky, The Hurricane, Rosey, Chris Masters, Viscera, Rhyno, Val Venis, Tyson Tomko, and Maven from Raw. Booker T last eliminated Chris Masters to win the Battle Royal.

Lilian Garcia performed "America the Beautiful" at the beginning of the event.

=== Preliminary matches ===
The first televised match was between Rey Mysterio and Eddie Guerrero. At the beginning of the match, Mysterio jumped over the top rope, knocking Guerrero down. Mysterio also attempted another aerial attack but was countered by Guerrero into a Powerbomb. Guerrero performed the Three Amigos on Mysterio and attempted a Frog splash but was unsuccessful. Following a Hurricanrana on Guerrero, Mysterio pinned Guerrero to win. After the match, both men shook hands in the ring.

John "Bradshaw" Layfield (JBL) and Orlando Jordan were then shown backstage discussing JBL's match against John Cena. Triple H and Ric Flair walked by as Triple H mocked JBL. JBL retaliated by advising Triple H to worry about losing the World Heavyweight Championship to Batista and assured him that Cena would be unsuccessful at defeating JBL for the WWE Championship. Triple H responded that only the end of the night would reveal who would still be champion.

The match that followed was the first Money in the Bank ladder match which featured Chris Jericho, Chris Benoit, Shelton Benjamin, Edge, Kane, and Christian with Tyson Tomko at ringside. The match contained many notable moments, including points where Jericho, Christian, Benjamin, and Kane all jumped over the top rope to the outside of the ring to knock down multiple opponents. Another moment included Benjamin executing a T-Bone Suplex on Edge off a ladder and later using an inclined ladder as a ramp to run up and perform a Clothesline on Jericho. Benoit also executed a Diving headbutt off a ladder onto Kane. In the conclusion of the match, Benoit climbed a ladder to attempt to retrieve the Money in the Bank briefcase but was stopped by Kane, who had also climbed the ladder. Benoit used repeated headbutts to knock Kane to the floor and attempted to retrieve the briefcase once more but was knocked down by Edge, who struck him with a steel chair. Edge then climbed the ladder and successfully retrieved the briefcase to win the match.

In an interlude, Eugene came down to the ring and shared his excitement about being at his first WrestleMania with the crowd in attendance. While attempting to recall his favorite WrestleMania moments, Muhammad Hassan and Daivari interrupted him, with Hassan expressing his outrage for not being included in a match for the event. Hassan concluded that since he wasn't scheduled to compete at the event and was therefore denied the opportunity to experience his own WrestleMania "moment", he would have to create a "moment" of his own. Following this remark, Hassan and Daivari began to assault Eugene. With Eugene placed into a Camel clutch while Daivari verbally attacked him, Hulk Hogan came down to the ring, knocking Hassan and Daivari out of the ring. Hogan celebrated by posing in the ring for the crowd.

The third match featured The Undertaker and Randy Orton. Bob Orton Jr., Randy's father, interfered and attacked The Undertaker with his arm cast, resulting in Orton gaining control of the match. The Undertaker attempted to chokeslam Orton, but Orton countered the maneuver with an RKO for a near-fall. Orton then attempted a Tombstone piledriver on The Undertaker but it was reversed by The Undertaker into a Tombstone of his own to win the match and continued his undefeated streak at WrestleMania with a 13–0 record.

The next match was for the WWE Women's Championship, an encounter between Trish Stratus and Christy Hemme with Lita at ringside. Stratus controlled most of the match though Hemme attempted many pinning maneuvers that were unsuccessful. Hemme then executed a Twist of Fate on Stratus for a near-fall. After a roll-up attempt by both Stratus and Hemme, Stratus performed a Chick kick to win the match and retain the WWE Women's Championship.

The fifth match was the encounter of Shawn Michaels and Kurt Angle. The beginning of the match saw back-and-forth action between the two. Mid-way in the match, Michaels hit Angle with a low blow, after he countered a suplex from Angle. Following the low blow, which was not seen by the referee, Michaels leapfrogged from the ring and laid out Angle on a broadcast table. Later, Angle countered a Sweet Chin Music attempt into the Ankle Lock, but Michaels reached the bottom rope to break the hold. Michaels countered another Ankle Lock attempt into a roll-up for a nearfall. Angle attempted a Moonsault, but Michaels moved out of the way. As Michaels went to the top rope, Angle performed an Angle Slam on Michaels for a nearfall. Michaels performed Sweet Chin Music on Angle for a nearfall. As Michaels made it back to his feet, Angle applied the Ankle Lock, and Michaels eventually submitted. After the match, Michaels was given a standing ovation from the audience.

"Rowdy" Roddy Piper confronted Stone Cold Steve Austin in Piper's Pit until Carlito interrupted and insulted them. Carlito received a Stone Cold Stunner from Austin and Piper threw him out of the ring. Both ended the segment celebrating with beer until Austin gave Piper a Stone Cold Stunner.

The next match was between Akebono and Big Show in a Sumo match. The match was a little over a minute and Akebono won the match after he threw Big Show out of the ring.

The next match was John Cena versus John "Bradshaw" Layfield (JBL) for the WWE Championship. JBL controlled most of the bout. Cena won the match after ducking a Clothesline from Hell attempt and executing an FU to win the title.

=== Main event ===
The main event was Triple H defending his World Heavyweight Championship against Batista. Triple H entered to "The Game" performed live by Motörhead. The action was back and forth, with neither man in control for very long periods. While the referee was down, Triple H attacked Batista with a low blow and the title belt for a near fall. In the climax, Batista would pin Triple H after a Batista Bomb to win the match and title.

== Reception ==
WrestleMania 21 received universally positive reviews from critics and fans. However, critics noted the matches for the WWE Championship and World Heavyweight Championship were disappointing compared to the rest of the card. John Powell of Canadian Online Explorer's professional wrestling section noted that "The changing of the guard that many people expected came with a whimper instead of a bang. In a total reversal from last year's show – where a largely mundane card was saved by the emotional title victories of Chris Benoit and Eddie Guerrero – this year's elevation of rising stars John Cena and Dave Batista had no such drama. Unable to live up to the high standards set by the Undertaker-Randy Orton and Shawn Michaels-Kurt Angle bouts, the "main events" offered the worst kind of anticlimax and would have been right at home buried in the middle of the card." He rated the entire event 7 out of 10 stars, which has a higher rating than the previous year's event. The main event between Batista and Triple H for the World Heavyweight Championship was rated 6 out of 10 stars, the match between John "Bradshaw" Layfield and John Cena was rated 5 out of 10 stars, the match between Kurt Angle and Shawn Michaels received the highest rating of 9 out of 10 stars, the match between The Undertaker and Randy Orton and The Money in the Bank ladder match were rated 8 out of 10 stars. Robert Leighty Jr. of 411Mania gave the event an overall score of 7.0 out of 10.0 noted that "If the two Title matches would have delivered this would have gone down as one of the greatest WrestleMania's ever, but they didn't and that left a flat ending to the show. Everything up to Shawn/Angle is fantastic and things kind of close with a whimper. Still, this is a historic show as it cemented the rise of Batista/Cena/Orton as Main Event players. It also has two great matches with Shawn/Angle and Money in the Bank. Definitely a good WrestleMania, but it could have been much more." J.D. Dunn of 411Mania response towards WrestleMania 21 was also positive. He stated that "this was on its way to being every bit as good as last year's Mania" but "then it hit a wall in the last 90 minutes." He later stated that "If this were a regular PPV with the Michaels vs. Angle match being the main event, this would be one of the greatest PPV's ever. Unfortunately, it drags on after that and limps to a finish." Although he praised the booking of the event saying that, "they made all the right moves booking-wise, so while the matches weren't great, they still have a certain historic value."

The match between Kurt Angle and Shawn Michaels would go on to win the 2005 Pro Wrestling Illustrated match of the year award. In 2019, WWE named it the fifth best WrestleMania match of all time. Dave Meltzer gave the match 4 and 3/4 stars out of 5. Angle himself has called it "the greatest match of all time." The match was the subject of an episode of WWE Untold in 2020.

The Sumo match between the Big Show and Akebono was universally panned with Dave Meltzer giving it no stars, and it has frequently topped lists for worst WrestleMania matches and worst matches in overall. Reflecting on the match in 2018, Big Show said that he believed it was the "most embarrassing moment in wrestling."

For the Staples Center's 10th anniversary in 2009, WrestleMania 21 was ranked number 7 on the list of greatest moments in the venue's history as voted by fans.

== Aftermath ==
Batista and Triple H's feud would continue to Backlash where Batista and Triple H had a rematch for the World Heavyweight Championship. Batista won the match after a Batista Bomb. Following that, the two concluded their storyline at Vengeance where Batista scored the third and final win over his former mentor inside Hell in a Cell. Shortly thereafter, Batista was drafted to the SmackDown! brand, ending their feud and taking the title with him to his new brand, while Triple H went on hiatus. 14 years later, at WrestleMania 35, Triple H (as a face) would defeat Batista (as a heel) in a No Holds Barred match with Triple H's career on the line, which also was Batista's last match as an in ring competitor as he would retire shortly after.

John Cena and John "Bradshaw" Layfield (JBL) continued to feud until Judgment Day, where they faced off in an "I Quit" match for the WWE Championship, which Cena won. Shortly after, Cena was drafted to Raw, ending their feud and taking the title with him.

Edge would hold on to his Money in the Bank briefcase until the following year at New Year's Revolution, where he cashed in the briefcase on John Cena after Cena just competed in an Elimination Chamber match, to retain his WWE Championship.

Shawn Michaels and Kurt Angle would continue their feud and face off again at Vengeance with Michaels picking up the win.

== Results ==
No.	Results	Stipulations	Times
1^{P}	Booker T won by last eliminating Chris Masters (Note: The other participants were: Paul London, Heidenreich, Spike Dudley, Nunzio, Funaki, Doug Basham, Danny Basham, Orlando Jordan, Mark Jindrak, Luther Reigns, Scotty 2 Hotty, Hardcore Holly, Charlie Haas, Billy Kidman, Akio, Simon Dean, William Regal, Tajiri, Rob Conway, Sylvain Grenier, Snitsky, The Hurricane, Rosey, Viscera, Rhyno, Val Venis, Tyson Tomko, and Maven.)	30-man Interpromotional battle royal	11:20
2	Rey Mysterio defeated Eddie Guerrero by pinfall	Singles match	12:23
3	Edge defeated Chris Jericho, Shelton Benjamin, Chris Benoit, Christian (with Tyson Tomko), and Kane	Money in the Bank ladder match	15:17
4	The Undertaker defeated Randy Orton by pinfall	Singles match	14:06
5	Trish Stratus (c) defeated Christy Hemme (with Lita) by pinfall	Singles match for the WWE Women's Championship	4:41
6	Kurt Angle defeated Shawn Michaels by submission	Singles match	27:26
7	Akebono defeated Big Show by throwing him out of the ring	Sumo match	1:02
8	John Cena defeated John "Bradshaw" Layfield (c) by pinfall	Singles match for the WWE Championship	11:26
9	Batista defeated Triple H (c) (with Ric Flair) by pinfall	Singles match for the World Heavyweight Championship	21:34
(c) / – the champion(s) heading into the match; P / – the match was broadcast on the pre-show

=== WWE Championship #1 Contender's Tournament ===
The tournament to determine the number one contender for the WWE Championship match at WrestleMania 21 was held between February 1 and February 20, 2005. At WrestleMania 21, John Cena defeated John "Bradshaw" Layfield to become the new champion. The tournament brackets were:

Quarterfinals
John Cena	Pin
Orlando Jordan
Eddie Guerrero
Booker T	Pin
The Undertaker	DCO
René Duprée	DCO
Rey Mysterio
Kurt Angle	Sub

Semifinals
John Cena	Pin
Booker T
---
Kurt Angle

Finals
John Cena	Pin
Kurt Angle	19:21
