= Funaki =

Funaki (written: 船木) is a Japanese surname. Notable people with the surname include:

- Kazuyoshi Funaki (born 1975), Olympic ski jumper
- Mari Funaki (1950–2010), Australian contemporary jeweller, designer, metal-smith and sculptor
- Masakatsu Funaki (born 1969), professional wrestler and mixed martial artist
- Shoichi Funaki (born 1968), professional wrestler formerly for World Wrestling Entertainment and Michinoku Pro Wrestling

== See also ==
- Steven Adams (Steven Funaki Adams, born 1993), New Zealand basketball player
