= Survivor Series (2004) =

World Wrestling Entertainment pay-per-view event

- Promotional poster featuring various WWE wrestlers
- Promotion: World Wrestling Entertainment
- Brand(s): Raw; SmackDown!
- Date: November 14, 2004
- City: Cleveland, Ohio
- Venue: Gund Arena
- Attendance: 7,500
- Buy rate: 325,000

Pay-per-view chronology
← Previous; Taboo Tuesday	Next → Armageddon

Survivor Series chronology
← Previous; 2003	Next → 2005

The 2004 Survivor Series was a professional wrestling pay-per-view (PPV) event produced by World Wrestling Entertainment (WWE). It was the 18th annual Survivor Series and took place on November 14, 2004, at the Gund Arena in Cleveland, Ohio, held for wrestlers from the promotion's Raw and SmackDown! brand divisions. This was the first Survivor Series to take place in Cleveland, but the fourth to take place in the U.S. state of Ohio, after the 1987, 1988, and 1992 events, which all took place in Richfield. The event centered on the Survivor Series match, a tag team elimination match that pits teams of multiple wrestlers against each other.

The main event was the main match on the Raw brand and was a Survivor Series match between Team Orton (Randy Orton, Chris Benoit, Chris Jericho, and Maven) and Team Triple H (Triple H, Edge, Batista, and Gene Snitsky), which Team Orton won after Orton last eliminated Triple H. The predominant match on the SmackDown! brand was John "Bradshaw" Layfield (JBL) versus Booker T for the WWE Championship, which JBL won to retain the title by pinfall after hitting Booker T with the title belt. One other Survivor Series match was held, which was the primary match on the undercard from SmackDown! between Team Guerrero (Eddie Guerrero, Big Show, Rob Van Dam, and John Cena) and Team Angle (Kurt Angle, Carlito Caribbean Cool, Luther Reigns and Mark Jindrak), which Team Guerrero won after Big Show last eliminated Angle.

Several of the existing feuds carried on following the event. Triple H continued feuding with Randy Orton, and at New Year's Revolution in January, Triple H last eliminated Orton in an Elimination Chamber match to win the vacant World Heavyweight Championship. John "Bradshaw" Layfield also continued his feud with Booker T, defeating him, Eddie Guerrero, and The Undertaker at Armageddon. Following the event, Carlito Caribbean Cool sustained a legitimate injury and lost the WWE United States Championship to John Cena, with whom he was in a storyline.

== Production ==
=== Background ===
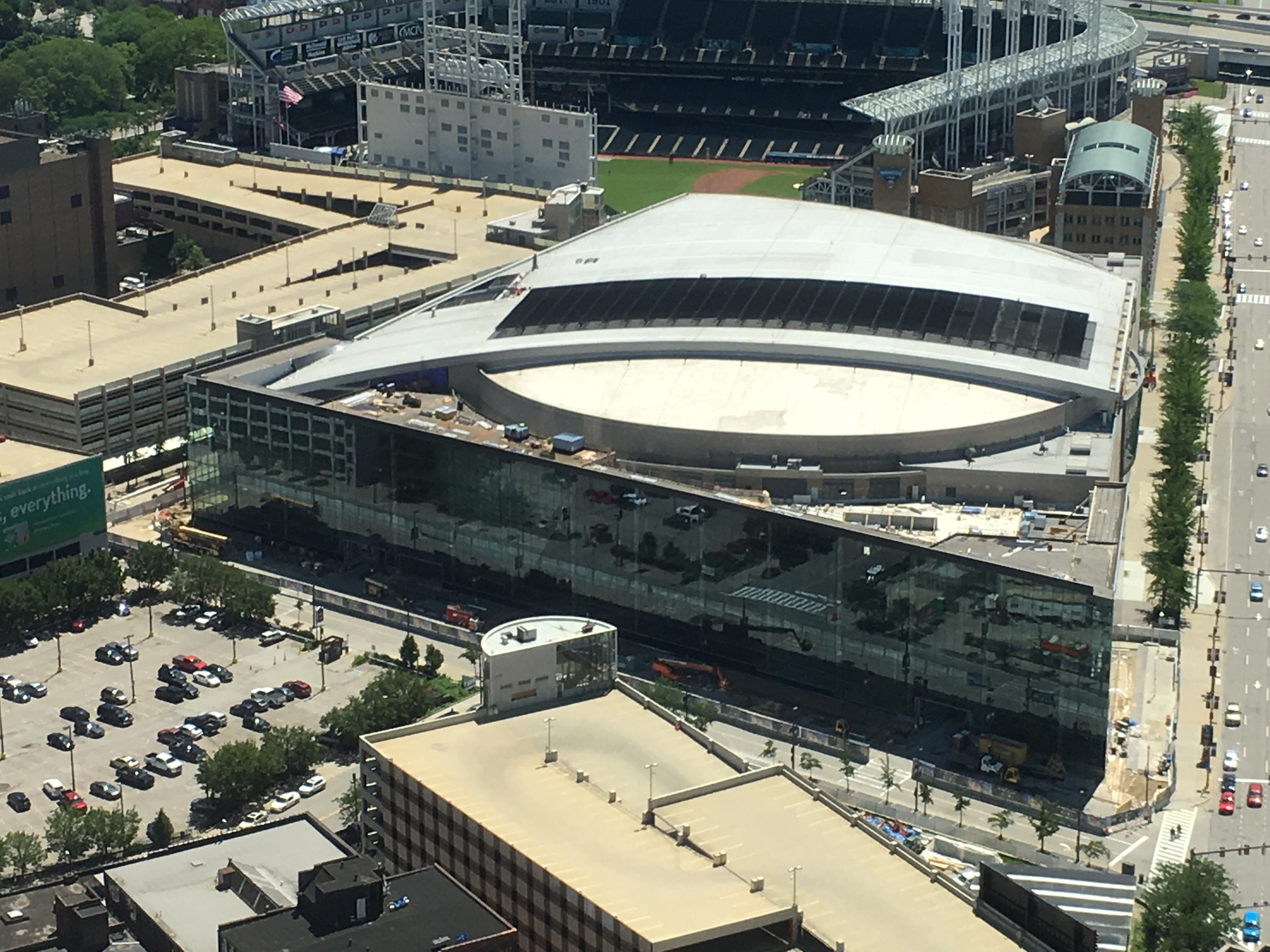
The event was held at Gund Arena in Cleveland, Ohio.

Survivor Series is an annual professional wrestling pay-per-view (PPV) event, produced every November by World Wrestling Entertainment (WWE) since 1987, generally held around Thanksgiving in the United States. In what has become the second longest-running pay-per-view event in history (behind WWE's WrestleMania), it is one of the promotion's original four pay-per-views, along with WrestleMania, SummerSlam, and Royal Rumble, referred to as the "Big Four". The event is traditionally characterized by having Survivor Series matches, which are tag team elimination matches that typically pits teams of four or five wrestlers against each other. The 18th Survivor Series event was scheduled to be held on November 14, 2004, at the Gund Arena in Cleveland, Ohio and featured wrestlers from the Raw and SmackDown! brands.

=== Storylines ===
The event featured seven wrestling matches with wrestlers involved in pre-existing scripted feuds, plots, and storylines. All wrestlers belonged to either the Raw or SmackDown! brands – storyline divisions in which WWE assigned its employees to different programs.

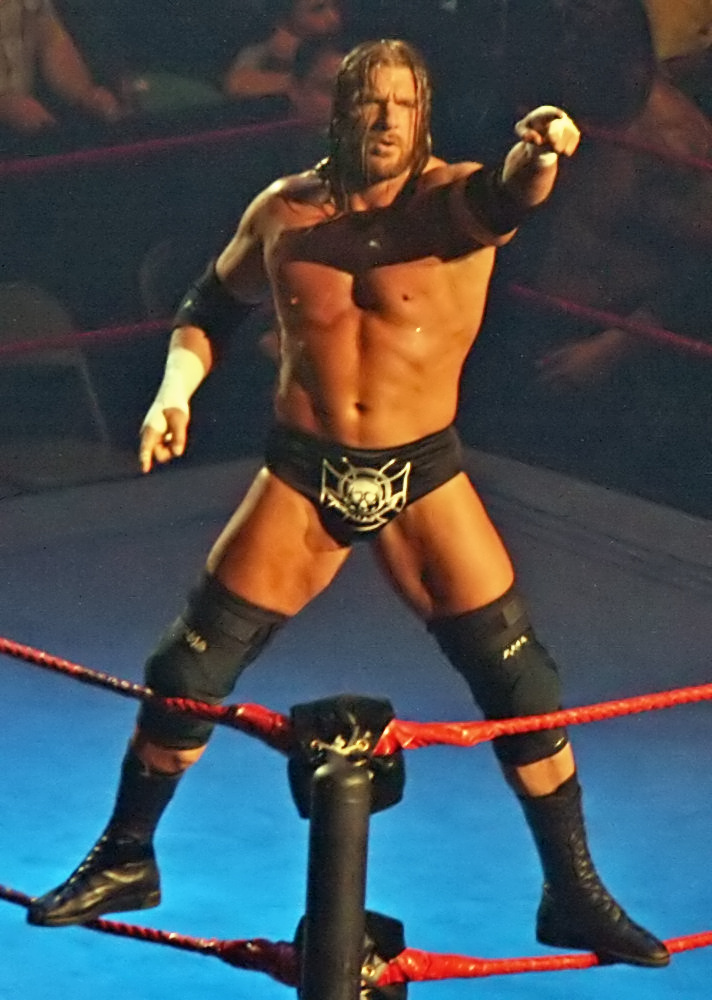
Triple H, the captain for Team Triple H at Survivor Series

The main feud on the Raw brand was between Team Orton (Randy Orton, Chris Benoit, Chris Jericho, and Maven) and Team Triple H (Triple H, Edge, Batista, and Gene Snitsky). On the October 25 episode of Raw, Evolution (Triple H, Ric Flair and Batista) were put in charge of Raw, after Raw General Manager Eric Bischoff took the night off. Triple H granted Flair the match of his choice; Flair wanted a rematch with Orton, as he lost a Steel Cage match to Orton at Taboo Tuesday. Orton accepted Flair's challenge, with a stipulation that if he defeated Flair he would get an opportunity to face Triple H for the World Heavyweight Championship at Survivor Series, and if he lost, he would never be allowed to challenge for the title again. Orton, however, lost the match after interference by Triple H, so Orton was banned from challenging for the World Heavyweight Championship. On the November 1 episode of Raw, Bischoff scheduled a traditional 4-on-4 elimination tag team match between Orton, Jericho, Maven and Benoit and Triple H, Batista, Edge and Snitsky at Survivor Series. The winning team at Survivor Series would be granted absolute control of running Raw for a month. On the November 8 episode of Raw, Bischoff concluded with adding that the winning members at Survivor Series would all get a week to be in charge of Raw. That same night, Edge and Benoit were scheduled in a match, where Triple H, Batista, Orton, Jericho and Maven came out to ringside to watch the match. At ringside, a fight broke out between Triple H and Orton's team, which caused the match to end in a No Contest.

The predominant feud on the SmackDown! brand was between John "Bradshaw" Layfield (JBL) versus Booker T, with the two battling over JBL's WWE Championship. On the October 21 episode of SmackDown!, SmackDown! General Manager Theodore Long booked a six-man tag team match involving Booker T, Rob Van Dam, and Rey Mysterio taking on JBL, Kenzo Suzuki, and René Duprée. At the time, Booker T was a heel and congratulated JBL's success with the company in a segment backstage. The tag team match got underway, and JBL was led to believe that Booker T was going to betray Van Dam and Mysterio, as Booker T warned both Van Dam and Mysterio not to interfere with him during the match. The match concluded with Booker T pinning JBL after an axe kick, thus turning Booker T face. On the October 28 episode of SmackDown!, Booker T defeated Orlando Jordan to earn the right to face JBL for the WWE Championship at Survivor Series. On the November 4 episode of SmackDown!, JBL interfered in a match between Booker T and Jordan, which ended in a disqualification, giving Booker T the win. After the disqualification by JBL, Theodore Long scheduled a tag team match between Booker T and Josh Mathews versus JBL and Jordan. The tag team victory was given to Booker T and Mathews, as Booker T pinned Jordan for the win.

One of the primary matches on the SmackDown! brand was between Team Guerrero (Eddie Guerrero, The Big Show, Rob Van Dam and John Cena) versus Team Angle (Kurt Angle, Carlito, Luther Reigns and Mark Jindrak). On the October 28 episode of SmackDown!, Theodore Long booked a 4-on-4 Survivor Series elimination match between Guerrero, Big Show, Van Dam, and Rey Mysterio against Angle, Carlito, Reigns and Jindrak. On the November 4 episode of SmackDown!, Mysterio was removed from the elimination match, as Long booked Mysterio in a Fatal Four-Way match for the WWE Cruiserweight Championship. Guerrero was given a week to choose a member for his team at Survivor Series. On the November 11 episode of SmackDown!, Guerrero announced that John Cena, who was recovering from a storyline injury, would be joining his team at Survivor Series.

== Event ==
Other on-screen personnel
Role:	Name:
English commentators	Jim Ross (Raw)
English commentators	Jerry Lawler (Raw)
English commentators	Michael Cole (SmackDown!)
English commentators	Tazz (SmackDown!)
Spanish commentators	Carlos Cabrera (Spanish)
Spanish commentators	Hugo Savinovich (Spanish)
Interviewers	Jonathan Coachman
Interviewers	Maria Kanellis
Ring announcers	Howard Finkel (Raw)
Ring announcers	Tony Chimel (SmackDown!)
Referees	Mike Chioda (Raw)
Referees	Chad Patton (Raw)
Referees	Jack Doan (Raw)
Referees	Earl Hebner (Raw)
Referees	Jim Korderas (SmackDown!)
Referees	Brian Hebner (SmackDown!)
Referees	Charles Robinson (SmackDown!)
Referees	Nick Patrick (SmackDown!)

Before the event went live on pay-per-view, World Tag Team Champions La Résistance (Sylvain Grenier and Robért Conway) defeated The Hurricane and Rosey in a non-title match shown live on Sunday Night Heat.

=== Preliminary matches ===
The first match was a fatal four-way match for the WWE Cruiserweight Championship between Spike Dudley, Billy Kidman, Chavo Guerrero, and Rey Mysterio. After back and forth action, Spike pinned Chavo after a springboard leg drop by Kidman to retain the title.

Next was a match between Shelton Benjamin and Christian for the WWE Intercontinental Championship. During the match, Benjamin attempted to attack Tyson Tomko, who accompanied Christian to the match, but Christian stopped Benjamin. Each man gained control throughout the match. The match ended when Benjamin pinned Christian after a T-Bone Suplex.

In the third match, Team Guerrero (Eddie Guerrero, Big Show, Rob Van Dam, and John Cena) faced Team Angle (Kurt Angle, Mark Jindrak, Luther Reigns, and Carlito) in a 4-on-4 Traditional Survivor Series Elimination Match. Carlito was eliminated as Cena chased him from the arena before the match began. Angle eliminated Van Dam after a roll-up using the ropes for leverage. Guerrero eliminated Jindrak after a roll-up, also using the ropes for leverage. Big Show eliminated Reigns after a chokeslam. Guerrero eliminated Angle after an FU by Cena and a frog splash by him, meaning Team Guerrero won the match.

=== Main event matches ===
In the fourth match The Undertaker faced Heidenreich. Both men managed to gain the advantage in the match. During the match, Paul Heyman interfered on behalf of Heidenreich. The Undertaker executed a Chokeslam and a Tombstone Piledriver on Heidenreich to win.

The fifth match was between Trish Stratus and Lita for the WWE Women's Championship. Lita was disqualified for hitting Stratus with a chair, meaning Stratus retained the title. The match turned out to be an intensely violent affair where Stratus legitimately broke her nose after Lita slammed her into a chair, which caused Stratus to bleed. Sticking to her storyline of her being depressed after losing Kane's baby, Lita viciously attacked Stratus twice even after her nose was broken, with Lita apparently unaware of Stratus's legitimate injury.

In the sixth match John "Bradshaw" Layfield (JBL) faced Booker T for the WWE Championship, with the stipulation if JBL lost he would leave SmackDown! forever. The match saw both men gain the advantage before Orlando Jordan interfered by attacking Booker T and the referee was knocked down by JBL. Booker T executed the scissors kick on JBL as a new referee came down to officiate the match, but Jordan removed JBL from the ring and tried to hit Booker T with the title belt. Booker T countered with a Book End on Jordan. JBL hit Booker T with the title belt and pinned him to retain the title.

The main event was the Survivor Series match between Team Orton (Randy Orton, Chris Benoit, Chris Jericho, and Maven) versus Team Triple H (Triple H, Batista, Edge, and Gene Snitsky) with the stipulation of the winning team being in charge of Raw for the next four weeks. Maven was attacked backstage by Snitsky before the match. Benoit was eliminated by Edge, after a Pedigree by Triple H. Batista was eliminated by Jericho after Orton hit Batista with the World Heavyweight title belt and an enziguri by Jericho. Snitsky was disqualified and eliminated for hitting Maven, who had returned for the match, with a chair. Maven was eliminated by Triple H after the chair shot from Snitsky. Jericho was eliminated by Edge after a spear. Edge was eliminated by Orton after an RKO. Triple H was eliminated by Orton after an RKO, leaving Orton as the sole survivor.

== Aftermath ==
=== Raw ===
As Team Orton (Randy Orton, Chris Benoit, Chris Jericho, and Maven) defeated Team Triple H (Triple H, Edge, Batista and Snitsky) at Survivor Series, they were given the opportunity to be in charge of Raw for a month; On the November 29 episode of Raw, Randy Orton was in charge and scheduled a World Heavyweight Championship Battle Royal. WWE Chairman Vince McMahon, however, overruled the Battle Royal match and instead booked Triple H to face the winner of the Battle Royal. The battle royal match saw Chris Benoit and Edge, as the final two participants, going over the top rope at the same time, ostensibly ending the match. Orton, acting as General Manager, booked a triple threat match between Benoit, Edge, and Triple H for the World Heavyweight Championship. The match resulted in Benoit applying the Crossface on Edge, only for Edge to manage to roll Benoit over, while the Crossface was still locked in, causing Benoit's shoulders to touch the mat. The referee began counting, which moments later led to Edge to submit to the maneuver. The following week, with Chris Jericho in charge, Vince McMahon vacated the World Heavyweight Championship, concluding the match ended in a tie. On the December 13 episode of Raw, Eric Bischoff, who had resumed his position as General Manager, scheduled an Elimination Chamber match between Triple H, Edge, Benoit, Chris Jericho, Orton and Batista at New Year's Revolution for the vacant World Heavyweight Championship. The following week, Bischoff concluded with adding a Special Guest Referee for the Elimination Chamber: Shawn Michaels. At New Year's Revolution, Triple H won the Elimination Chamber to begin his tenth world title reign.

=== SmackDown ===
After retaining the WWE Championship against Booker T, John "Bradshaw" Layfield (JBL) was inserted into previous feuds with Eddie Guerrero, Booker T, and The Undertaker. The feud led to SmackDown! General Manager Theodore Long booking a fatal four-way match at Armageddon in December. The match was won by JBL, as he pinned Booker T after a Clothesline from Hell and successfully retained the title.

In October, John Cena lost the WWE United States Championship to Carlito Caribbean Cool, who debuted on SmackDown!. As part of the storyline, Carlito's bodyguard, Jesús, stabbed Cena in the kidney while at a nightclub. On the November 18 episode of SmackDown!, Cena regained the United States Championship by defeating Carlito. Cena also debuted a "custom made" spinner-style title belt.

== Results ==
No.	Results	Stipulations	Times
1^{H}	La Résistance (Sylvain Grenier and Robért Conway) defeated The Hurricane and Rosey	Tag team match	4:59
2	Spike Dudley (c) defeated Billy Kidman, Chavo Guerrero and Rey Mysterio	Fatal 4-Way match for the WWE Cruiserweight Championship	9:04
3	Shelton Benjamin (c) defeated Christian (with Tyson Tomko)	Singles match for the WWE Intercontinental Championship	13:24
4	Team Guerrero (Eddie Guerrero, Big Show, John Cena and Rob Van Dam) defeated Team Angle (Kurt Angle, Carlito Caribbean Cool, Luther Reigns and Mark Jindrak) (with Jesús)	4-on-4 Survivor Series match^{1}	12:26
5	The Undertaker defeated Heidenreich (with Paul Heyman)	Singles match	15:55
6	Trish Stratus (c) defeated Lita by disqualification	Singles match for the WWE Women's Championship	1:21
7	John "Bradshaw" Layfield (c) (with Orlando Jordan) defeated Booker T	Singles match for the WWE Championship. Had JBL lost, he would have left wrestling forever.	14:43
8	Team Orton (Randy Orton, Chris Benoit, Chris Jericho and Maven) defeated Team Triple H (Triple H, Batista, Edge and Gene Snitsky) (with Ric Flair)	4-on-4 Survivor Series match^{2} Whichever team won would each be in charge of Raw for the next four weeks.	24:32
(c) / – the champion(s) heading into the match; H / – the match was broadcast prior to the pay-per-view on Sunday Night Heat

=== Survivor Series matches ===
==== SmackDown! ====
Eliminated	Wrestler	Eliminated by	Team	Method	Time
1	Carlito Caribbean Cool	N/A	Team Angle	Left the arena	0:00
2	Rob Van Dam	Kurt Angle	Team Guerrero	Pinfall	8:45
3	Mark Jindrak	Eddie Guerrero	Team Angle	Pinfall	9:12
4	Luther Reigns	Big Show	Team Angle	Pinfall	10:30
5	Kurt Angle	Big Show	Team Angle	Pinfall	12:26
Survivor(s):	Eddie Guerrero, Big Show and John Cena (Team Guerrero)				

==== Raw ====
Eliminated	Wrestler	Eliminated by	Team	Method	Time
1	Chris Benoit	Edge	Team Orton	Pinfall	7:26
2	Batista	Chris Jericho	Team Triple H	Pinfall	10:41
3	Gene Snitsky	N/A	Team Triple H	Disqualification	16:02
4	Maven	Triple H	Team Orton	Pinfall	16:50
5	Chris Jericho	Edge	Team Orton	Pinfall	18:07
6	Edge	Randy Orton	Team Triple H	Pinfall	23:00
7	Triple H	Randy Orton	Team Triple H	Pinfall	24:32
Sole Survivor:	Randy Orton (Team Orton)				
