= The Cabinet (professional wrestling) =

Professional wrestling stable

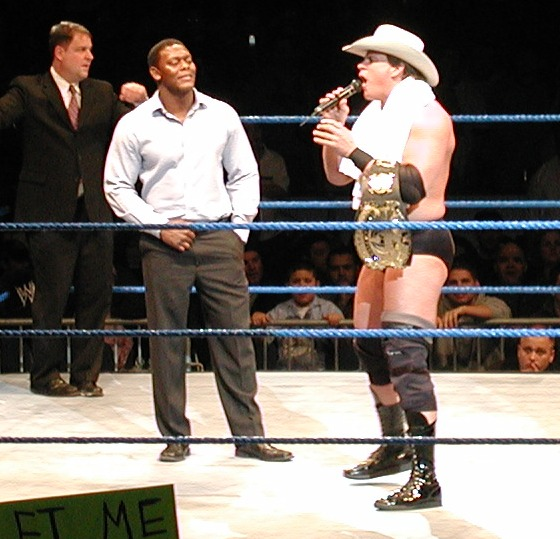
- Orlando Jordan (left) and John “Bradshaw” Layfield (right)

Statistics
- Former members: John “Bradshaw” Layfield (leader); Orlando Jordan; Amy Weber; Doug Basham; Danny Basham; Jillian Hall
- Debut: August 12, 2004; 22 years ago
- Disbanded: May 26, 2006; 20 years ago
- Years active: 2004–2006

The Cabinet was a villainous professional wrestling stable in WWE on the SmackDown! brand from 2004 to 2006. Led by John “Bradshaw” Layfield, the group portrayed a presidential-style cabinet, with members holding titles mirroring those of U.S. government officials. The stable was formed shortly after JBL won the WWE Championship at The Great American Bash in 2004 with the aim of protecting JBL's interests as the WWE Champion.

== History ==
=== Formation and dominance (2004–2005) ===
In mid-2004, following his victory for the WWE Championship, John "Bradshaw" Layfield introduced The Cabinet as his entourage to solidify his status as champion. The initial members included Orlando Jordan as his "Chief of Staff" and Amy Weber as his "Image Consultant." The Basham Brothers (Doug and Danny Basham) would later join as the "Co-Secretaries of Defense".

Throughout late 2004 and early 2005, The Cabinet assisted JBL in retaining the WWE Championship against various challengers, including Eddie Guerrero, The Undertaker, Booker T, Kurt Angle and Big Show. Their frequent interference (along with that of Heidenreich and Kurt Angle's proteges Mark Jindrak and Luther Reigns) contributed to JBL's nine-month title reign, which was the longest of the decade until it was later surpassed by John Cena, who ended JBL's reign.

In addition to the WWE Championship, the Cabinet also secured the WWE United States Championship (Orlando Jordan) and WWE Tag Team Championship (the Basham Brothers) belts during this time (the Bashams later lost their championships to the team of Eddie Guerrero and Rey Mysterio at No Way Out 2005 while Orlando Jordan retained his championship until SummerSlam 2005 when he submitted to Chris Benoit in a record 25.5 seconds).

=== Membership changes and decline (2005–2006) ===
In early 2005, Amy Weber departed from WWE, with her exit explained on-screen by JBL firing her after a series of mishaps. The Basham Brothers grew dissatisfied with their lack of recognition and left The Cabinet on the June 16 episode of ‘‘SmackDown!’’ They were later split during the 2005 WWE draft lottery.

After losing the WWE Championship at WrestleMania 21, JBL attempted to revitalize his career by hiring Jillian Hall as his “Fixer” and publicist in September 2005. Despite this addition, The Cabinet's presence dwindled. Orlando Jordan quietly separated from JBL after losing the United States Championship and was released from WWE in May 2006. JBL transitioned to a commentator role before temporarily retiring from in-ring competition, effectively disbanding The Cabinet.

== Members ==
The Cabinet was structured to resemble a political cabinet, with each member holding a specific title:

- President/Leader: John “Bradshaw” Layfield
- Chief of Staff: Orlando Jordan
- Image Consultant: Amy Weber (departed in February 2005)
- Co-Secretaries of Defense: The Basham Brothers (Doug and Danny Basham; left the group in June 2005)
- Publicist/Fixer: Jillian Hall (joined in September 2005)

The group's signature gesture was the “Longhorn” pose, where members raised their arms horizontally at a 45° angle with hands flat, a symbolic representation of JBL's Texas longhorn logo.

== Championships and accomplishments ==
- Pro Wrestling Illustrated
  - PWI ranked John "Bradshaw" Layfield No. 5 of the 500 best singles wrestlers in the PWI 500 in 2005
- World Wrestling Entertainment
  - WWE Championship (1 time) – John "Bradshaw" Layfield
  - WWE United States Championship (1 time) – Orlando Jordan (1)
  - WWE Tag Team Championship (1 time) – The Basham Brothers
- Wrestling Observer Newsletter
  - Best Gimmick (2004) – John "Bradshaw" Layfield
