= Luther Reigns =

American actor and professional wrestler (born 1971)

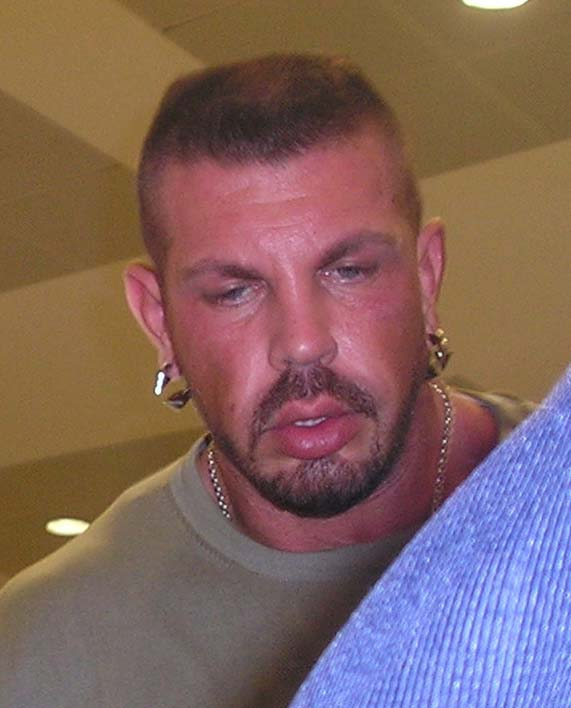
- Reigns in 2008

Personal information
- Born: Matthew Robert Wiese; September 22, 1971 (age 54) New York City, U.S.

Professional wrestling career
- Ring name(s): Horshu; Inspector Impact; Inspector Max Impact; Luther Reigns
- Billed height: 6 ft 5 in (196 cm)
- Billed weight: 285 lb (129 kg)
- Billed from: Phoenix, Arizona
- Trained by: Navajo Warrior; WCW Power Plant
- Debut: 1997
- Retired: September 16, 2006

Matthew Robert Wiese (born September 22, 1971) is an American retired professional wrestler and actor. He is best known for his tenure in WWE, where he performed on its SmackDown brand under the ring name Luther Reigns.

== Professional wrestling career ==
=== World Championship Wrestling (1997–1998) ===
In 1996, Wiese tried out for the Power Plant, World Championship Wrestling (WCW)'s professional wrestling school. Upon completing his training, Wiese started his wrestling career as an enhancement talent in WCW in 1997 using the ring name Horshu. He was among six wrestlers who "auditioned" for an anti-New World Order faction called Piper's Family on the March 3, 1997 episode of Monday Nitro, spearheaded by "Rowdy" Roddy Piper. After being tested in a 30-second impromptu match with Piper, Wiese was quickly defeated via sleeper hold after attempting to use dirty tactics to defeat Piper.

=== AWA Superstars of Wrestling (1999–2003) ===
After his stint in WCW, Wiese made his way to Ultimate Pro Wrestling (UPW) for more training. He then debuted in AWA Superstars of Wrestling as Horshu, winning their World Heavyweight Championship and holding the title for a total of nine months. However, he was stripped of the title due to missing mandatory title defenses, and left the promotion shortly afterwards.

=== World Wrestling Entertainment (2003–2005) ===
In June 2003, he signed a developmental contract from World Wrestling Entertainment and was sent to wrestle in their then-developmental territory Ohio Valley Wrestling (OVW) under the ring name Inspector Max Impact. After a few non-televised matches before Raw in 2003 and 2004, Wiese was promoted to the main roster in April 2004 under the name Luther Reigns, where he became the "assistant" to then-SmackDown! general manager Kurt Angle. Reigns made his in-ring debut on the June 17 episode of SmackDown!, defeating Funaki. He made his pay-per-view debut at The Great American Bash on June 27, defeating Charlie Haas in a singles match.

Reigns and Angle introduced the newly drafted Mark Jindrak as a new member of their team during their tag team match against Big Show and Eddie Guerrero in September. The two assisted Angle in his feuds and helped him win most of his matches. On October 3 at No Mercy, Reigns lost to Guerrero. At Survivor Series on November 14, he took part in a 4-on-4 Survivor Series elimination match with Jindrak, Angle and Carlito Caribbean Cool, losing to Guerrero, Big Show, John Cena and Rob Van Dam. Reigns, Jindrak and Angle then lost to Big Show in a handicap match at Armageddon on December 12.

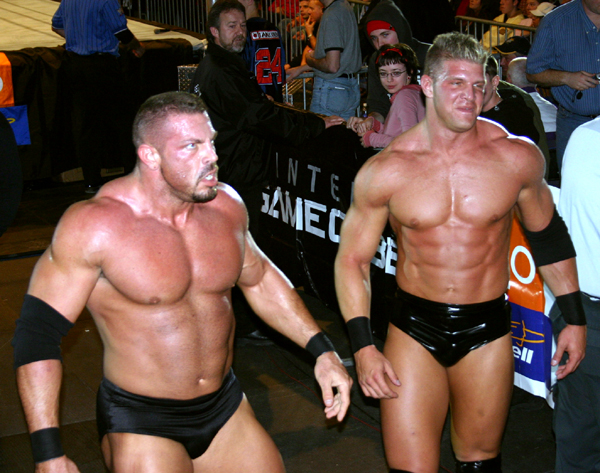
Reigns and Mark Jindrak at a house show in January 2005

Their faction split in February 2005 as Reigns and Jindrak went off on their own to feud with The Undertaker. At No Way Out on February 20, Reigns lost to The Undertaker. After Reigns and Jindrak lost to The Undertaker in a "Double Jeopardy" handicap match on the February 24 edition of SmackDown!, they briefly argued before coming to blows and had to be pulled apart by officials. The following week, they failed to win the WWE Tag Team Championship from Guerrero and Rey Mysterio. After the match, Jindrak tried to help Reigns up to his feet, but Reigns smacked Jindrak in response. The two argued until Jindrak knocked Reigns out with a left hook. Reigns lost to Jindrak on the March 10 episode of SmackDown!, effectively ending their team.

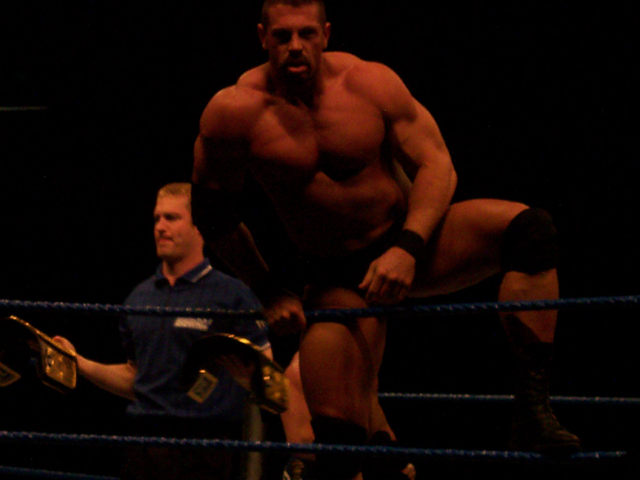
Reigns in April 2005

After this, Reigns resumed his feud with Big Show after saying that Big Show embarrassed the SmackDown! brand at WrestleMania 21 when Show lost to Akebono in a sumo match. Reigns unsuccessfully tried to tip over a Jeep to prove he was stronger than Show, who then successfully tipped the Jeep over. On April 7, in his final appearance on SmackDown!, Reigns lost to Big Show. Reigns then wrestled mainly on Velocity until he requested and was granted his release from WWE on May 11, 2005.

=== Late career (2005–2006) ===
Following his departure from WWE, Wiese operated a salon and attempted to become a real estate salesman. In mid-2005, Wiese returned to wrestling as Horshu for Ultimate Pro Wrestling (JPW), unsuccessfully challenging Tom Howard for the UPW Heavyweight Championship. On October 13, Horshu lost to The Patriot in a match for Impact Zone Wrestling, before defeating Sheik Hussein in an impromptu match in his debut for Scott Norton's Wild West Championship Wrestling on June 17. He returned to WWCW on September 16, where he wrestled Aaron Aguilera to a no contest after Norton interfered. Later that night, Horshu teamed with Heidenreich in a losing effort to Norton and Aguilera in what turned out to be Wiese's final match.

== Other media ==
=== Filmography ===
- The Girl Next Door (2004) as Mule
- True Legend (2009) in an uncredited role
- Spring Break '83 (2010) as Horseshoe
- Let's Be Cops (2014) as Pupa's Rival

=== Television ===
- The Jenny Jones Show (2003) in episode "From Geek to Bad Ass Physique"
- My Bare Lady (2006) in episodes "Floodlights and Catfights" and "Cattle Call" as himself
- Heroes (2008) in episodes "Dying of the Light" and "Angles and Monsters" as Milosh
- CSI: Crime Scene Investigation (2009) in episode "Disarmed and Dangerous" as Vinnie Mingus

== Personal life ==
Wiese has worked as a bodyguard, including for the AVN pornography convention in Las Vegas, and performed tour security for touring rock bands.

On April 19, 2010, it was reported that Wiese had suffered a stroke in December 2009. Wiese stated that he believed his steroid use, which began during his time at Arizona State University, and the painkiller addiction he developed from wrestling were contributing factors to the cause of the stroke.

On April 10, 2015, several media outlets reported that Wiese, along with Russ McCullough and fellow WWE alumnus Ryan Sakoda, had filed a class action lawsuit against WWE, alleging, among other things, that "the WWE has known for years ... the brutality in the ring has resulted in dementia, Alzheimer's disease and a lot more". The suit was litigated by attorney Konstantine Kyros, who has been involved in a number of other lawsuits against WWE. The lawsuit was dismissed by Judge Vanessa Lynne Bryant in March 2016.

== Championships and accomplishments ==
- AWA Superstars of Wrestling
  - AWA Superstars of Wrestling World Heavyweight Championship (1 time)
- Pro Wrestling Illustrated
  - Ranked No. 80 of the best 500 singles wrestlers in the PWI 500 in 2004
