= Royal Rumble (2004) =

World Wrestling Entertainment pay-per-view event

- Promotional poster featuring John Cena
- Promotion: World Wrestling Entertainment
- Brand(s): Raw; SmackDown!
- Date: January 25, 2004
- City: Philadelphia, Pennsylvania
- Venue: Wachovia Center
- Attendance: 17,289
- Buy rate: 582,000

Pay-per-view chronology
← Previous; Armageddon	Next → No Way Out

Royal Rumble chronology
← Previous; 2003	Next → 2005

The 2004 Royal Rumble was a professional wrestling pay-per-view (PPV) event produced by World Wrestling Entertainment (WWE), held for wrestlers from the promotion's Raw and SmackDown! brand divisions. It was the 17th annual Royal Rumble event and took place on January 25, 2004, at the Wachovia Center in Philadelphia, Pennsylvania.

The event was based around the men's Royal Rumble match, a modified 30-man battle royal in which the participants enter at timed intervals instead of all beginning in the ring at the same time and the winner received a world championship match at WrestleMania. As a result of the brand extension introduced in March 2002, which led to the creation of a second world championship with each brand having its own top title, the winner of the 2003 Royal Rumble challenged the world champion of their respective brand. For the 2004 event, the winner could choose which championship to challenge for at WrestleMania XX: Raw's World Heavyweight Championship or SmackDown!'s WWE Championship.

Six professional wrestling matches were featured on the event's supercard, a scheduling of more than one main event. The main event was the 2004 Royal Rumble match, which featured wrestlers from both brands. SmackDown!'s Chris Benoit, the first entrant, won the match by last eliminating Big Show, also from SmackDown!. This win resulted in Benoit breaking the longevity record at the time, last held by Bob Backlund, staying in the match for over one hour; this record would be broken by Rey Mysterio in 2006. Benoit also became the second wrestler to win the match as the first entrant, after Shawn Michaels. The primary match on the Raw brand was a Last Man Standing match between Triple H and Shawn Michaels for the World Heavyweight Championship, which ended in a draw. The predominant match on the SmackDown! brand was Brock Lesnar versus Hardcore Holly for the WWE Championship, which Lesnar won to retain the championship. The featured match on the undercard was a tables match for Raw's World Tag Team Championship between Evolution (Ric Flair and Batista) and the Dudley Boyz (Bubba Ray Dudley and D-Von Dudley), which Evolution won to retain.

== Production ==
=== Background ===
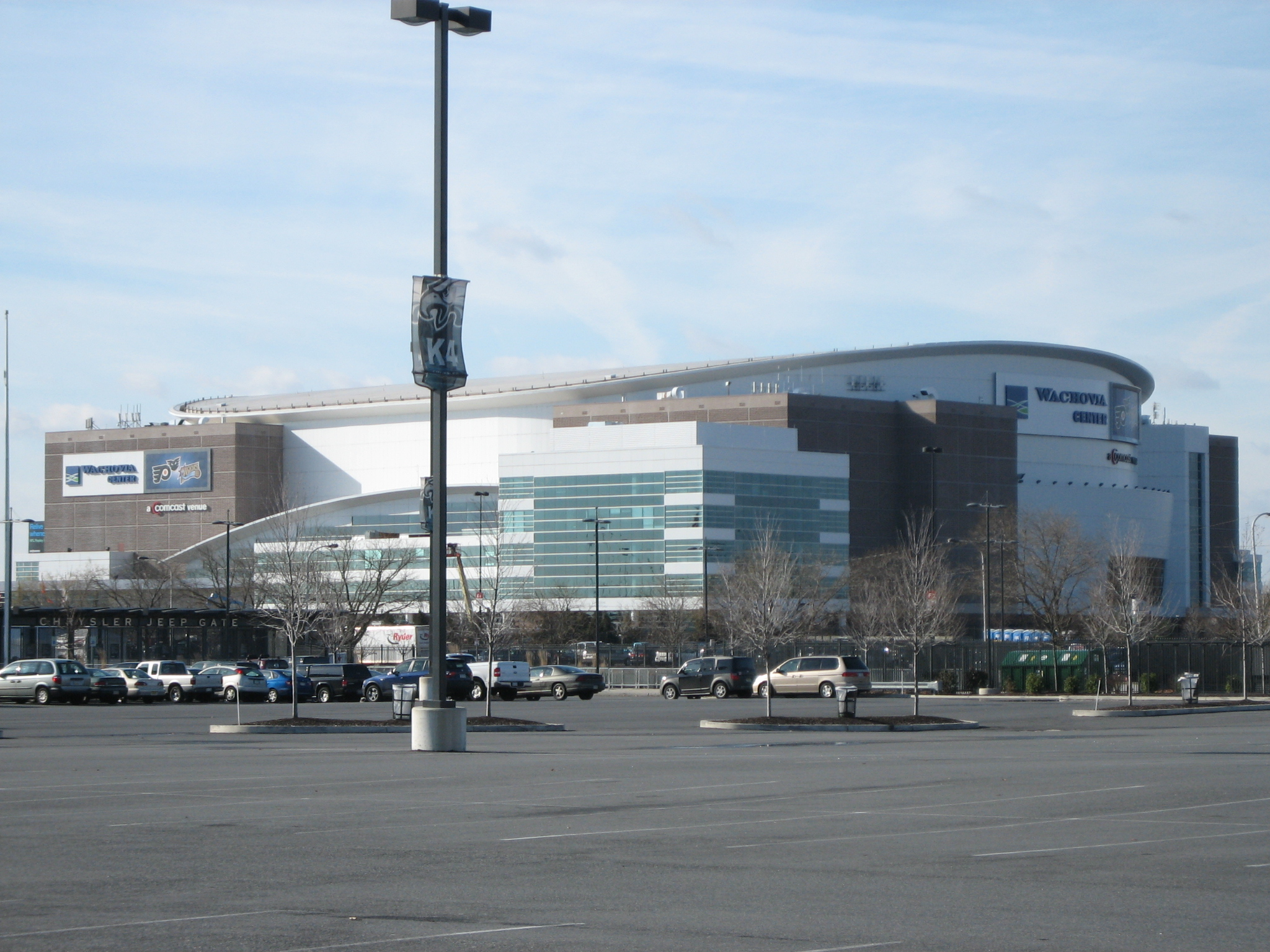
The 17th annual Royal Rumble event was held at the Wachovia Center in Philadelphia, Pennsylvania.

The Royal Rumble is an annual professional wrestling event, produced every January by World Wrestling Entertainment (WWE) since 1988; that first event was a television special before it became an annual pay-per-view (PPV) beginning in 1989. It is one of the promotion's original four pay-per-views, along with WrestleMania, SummerSlam, and Survivor Series, referred to as the "Big Four". It is named after and centered on the men's Royal Rumble match. The 17th Royal Rumble event was scheduled to be held on January 25, 2004, at the Wachovia Center in Philadelphia, Pennsylvania and featured wrestlers from the Raw and SmackDown! brands.

The Royal Rumble match is a modified battle royal in which the participants enter at timed intervals instead of all beginning in the ring at the same time, and it generally features 30 wrestlers. Since 1993, the winner earns a world championship match at that year's WrestleMania. With the introduction of the brand split in March 2002, which led to the creation of a second world championship with each brand having its own top title, the winner of the 2003 Royal Rumble earned a match for their respective brand's top championship, but for 2004, the winner could choose which title to challenge for at WrestleMania XX: Raw's World Heavyweight Championship or SmackDown!'s WWE Championship.

=== Storylines ===
The card included matches that resulted from scripted storylines. Results were predetermined by WWE's writers on the Raw and SmackDown! brands, while storylines were produced on WWE's weekly television shows, Raw and SmackDown!.

The buildup to the Royal Rumble match started on the January 1 episode of SmackDown!, when John Cena interrupted a promo from SmackDown! General Manager Paul Heyman about the Tribute to the Troops event in Iraq. This angered Heyman and Heyman forced Cena to compete in a handicap match with a partner and the two needed to win the match to gain entry in the Royal Rumble match. Cena's partner was revealed to be Chris Benoit and the two defeated The Full Blooded Italians (Nunzio, Chuck Palumbo, and Johnny Stamboli) to qualify for the Royal Rumble match. As a result, all the three members of Full Blooded Italians lost their spots in the Royal Rumble match; had Cena and Benoit would have lost, neither would have been able to participate in the match. After the match, Kurt Angle announced that he would participate in the Royal Rumble match and would win it. Later that night, Benoit insulted Heyman and Heyman forced Benoit to compete at the #1 spot in the Royal Rumble. On the January 5 episode of Raw, Kane announced that he was going to win the Royal Rumble but was confronted by Booker T, who claimed that he would eliminate Kane from the match and win the match. Three days later on SmackDown!, Benoit defeated the Full Blooded Italians in a handicap mini Royal Rumble to retain his spot in the Royal Rumble. On the January 12 episode of Raw, Goldberg defeated Matt Hardy and announced that he would participate in the Royal Rumble match. On the January 15 episode of SmackDown!, several qualifying matches were held for the Royal Rumble, including a battle royal between the Full Blooded Italians, which Nunzio won. On the January 19 episode of Raw, Goldberg, Randy Orton, Rob Van Dam, Booker T, Mark Henry, and Chris Jericho won matches to qualify for a Battle Royal to determine the #30 entrant of the Royal Rumble match. Goldberg won the match and earned the #30 spot in the Royal Rumble.

Royal Rumble qualification matches

- John Cena and Chris Benoit defeated Nunzio, Chuck Palumbo, and Johnny Stamboli in a handicap match – SmackDown!, December 30 (aired January 1)
- Rico defeated Tommy Dreamer – Heat, January 12 (aired January 18)
- Matt Morgan defeated Orlando Jordan – Velocity, January 13 (aired January 17)
- Rikishi defeated Scotty 2 Hotty – SmackDown!, January 13 (aired January 15)
- The World's Greatest Tag Team (Shelton Benjamin and Charlie Haas) defeated Basham Brothers (Doug Basham and Danny Basham) – SmackDown!, January 13 (aired January 15)
- Nunzio defeated Chuck Palumbo and Johnny Stamboli in a triple threat battle royal – SmackDown!, January 13 (aired January 15)
- Big Show defeated Funaki – SmackDown!, January 13 (aired January 15)
- Tajiri defeated Billy Kidman – SmackDown!, January 20 (aired January 22)
- A-Train defeated Shannon Moore – SmackDown!, January 20 (aired January 22)
- Bradshaw defeated Akio and Sakoda in a triple threat match – SmackDown!, January 20 (aired January 22)

The main rivalry heading into the event from the Raw brand was between Triple H and Shawn Michaels over the World Heavyweight Championship. At Armageddon, Triple H defeated Goldberg and Kane in a triple threat match to win the World Heavyweight Championship after interference from Evolution (Ric Flair and Batista). On the December 15 episode of Raw, Michaels and Rob Van Dam defeated Evolution (Triple H, Ric Flair and Batista) in a handicap match, when Michaels pinned Triple H. As a result, Michaels earned a World Heavyweight Championship match against Triple H on the December 29 episode of Raw in his hometown of San Antonio, Texas. Michaels seemingly defeated Triple H to win the title, but the Raw General Manager Eric Bischoff declared the match a draw due to both men's shoulders being down on the mat during the pinfall. As a result, Triple H retained the title. On the January 5 episode of Raw, the self-proclaimed Sheriff of Raw "Stone Cold" Steve Austin announced that Triple H would defend the title against Michaels in a Last Man Standing match at Royal Rumble.

The main rivalry heading into the event from the SmackDown! brand was between Brock Lesnar and Hardcore Holly over the WWE Championship. The rivalry could be dated back to September 12, 2002, episode of SmackDown!, when Lesnar defeated Holly in a non-title match and injured him by breaking his neck, putting him out of action for over a year. A year later, at Survivor Series, Holly returned to WWE from injury to take revenge from Lesnar. On the December 18 episode of SmackDown!, Paul Heyman announced that Holly would team with Shannon Moore in a tag team match against A-Train and Matt Morgan, in which Holly could get a match of his choosing if he won but if he lost, his WWE contract would be terminated. Holly and Moore won the match, allowing Holly to wrestle a match of his choosing. On the January 1 episode of SmackDown!, Holly intentionally got disqualified in a match against Big Show by brutally assaulting him. On the January 8 episode of SmackDown!, Holly defeated Big Show in a street fight. As a result, Big Show placed a restraining order on Holly and Lesnar stayed with Big Show to protect himself from Holly. On the January 22 episode of SmackDown!, Holly attacked Lesnar during a handicap match pitting Lesnar, Big Show, Matt Morgan, and Rhyno against John Cena and Chris Benoit. This led to a match between Lesnar and Holly for the WWE Championship at Royal Rumble.

A secondary rivalry heading into the event from the SmackDown! brand was between Eddie Guerrero and Chavo Guerrero. At Survivor Series, the Basham Brothers (Doug Basham and Danny Basham) defeated Los Guerreros (Eddie and Chavo) to retain the WWE Tag Team Championship. After the event, Los Guerreros started to break up as a team when Chavo began blaming Eddie for the team's recent failure. On the November 20 episode of SmackDown!, Los Guerreros defeated The World's Greatest Tag Team (Charlie Haas and Shelton Benjamin) but after the match, Haas and Benjamin attacked Chavo and injured his leg. This caused Chavo to blame Eddie for the injury. On the November 27 episode of SmackDown!, Chavo was attacked again and he blamed Eddie. This continued on the December 4 episode of SmackDown!, when Eddie helped Chavo in defeating Benjamin in a one-on-one match. Chavo blamed Eddie for stealing the spotlight that Chavo needed. On the January 1 episode of SmackDown!, Eddie and Chavo finally broke up the team after losing to The World's Greatest Tag Team. However, on the January 8 episode of SmackDown!, Kurt Angle reunited Los Guerreros and earned them a WWE Tag Team Championship match against the Basham Brothers, which Los Guerreros lost. After the match, Los Guerreros finally ended when Chavo attacked Eddie and caused him to bleed. As a result, Chavo turned heel. On the January 15 episode of SmackDown!, Angle informed Eddie that the SmackDown! General Manager Paul Heyman had made a match between Eddie and Chavo at Royal Rumble.

The secondary rivalry heading into the event from the Raw brand was between Evolution (Ric Flair and Batista) and The Dudley Boyz (Bubba Ray Dudley and D-Von Dudley) over the World Tag Team Championship. At Armageddon, Flair and Batista defeated Dudley Boyz in a Tag Team Turmoil match to win the World Tag Team Championship. On the December 29 episode of Raw, Flair served as the special guest referee during a match pitting Dudley Boyz against two enhancement talents. Flair awarded the victory to enhancement talents by disqualifying Dudley Boyz. Batista then came out and attacked Dudley Boyz from behind. On the January 5 episode of Raw, Flair and Batista defeated Dudley Boyz to retain the World Tag Team Championship. The next week on Raw, Batista defeated D-Von in a one-on-one match. After the match, Flair tossed a table into the ring and Batista set it up but Bubba Ray entered the ring and chased Flair and Batista. On the January 19 episode of Raw, Evolution member Randy Orton defeated The Hurricane in a match. After the match, Flair and Batista came out to congratulate Orton. Hurricane's tag team partner Rosey came out to check on him but was attacked by Batista. It led to Dudley Boyz coming out to deliver a 3-D on Flair through the table but Jonathan Coachman ran down to stop them and was hit with a 3D through the table by Dudley Boyz. This led to a tables match between Dudley Boyz and Evolution for the World Tag Team Championship at Royal Rumble.

Another secondary rivalry heading into the event from the SmackDown! brand was between Rey Mysterio and Jamie Noble over the WWE Cruiserweight Championship. On the January 1 episode of SmackDown!, Mysterio defeated Tajiri to win the Cruiserweight Championship. The following week, Tajiri and Noble were scheduled to have a number one contender's match for the Cruiserweight Championship, but Noble was not present on the show. As a result, Paul Heyman ordered Noble's manager Nidia to replace Noble in the match. Tajiri easily defeated Nidia. After the match, Tajiri tried to assault Nidia, but Mysterio rescued her. This prompted Noble to come out and attack Mysterio as he thought that Mysterio was trying to harm Nidia. On the January 15 episode of SmackDown!, Noble defeated Tajiri to become the number one contender for the Cruiserweight Championship at Royal Rumble.

== Event ==
Other on-screen personnel
Role:	Name:
English commentators	Michael Cole (SmackDown!)
English commentators	Tazz (SmackDown! / Royal Rumble match)
English commentators	Jim Ross (Raw / Royal Rumble match)
English commentators	Jerry Lawler (Raw)
English commentators	Jonathan Coachman (Opening match)
Spanish commentators	Carlos Cabrera
Spanish commentators	Hugo Savinovich
Interviewers	Josh Mathews
Interviewers	Terri Runnels
Ring announcers	Tony Chimel (Smackdown!)
Ring announcers	Howard Finkel (Raw / Royal Rumble match)
Referees	Charles Robinson (Raw)
Referees	Mike Chioda (Raw)
Referees	Jack Doan (Raw)
Referees	Earl Hebner (Raw)
Referees	Brian Hebner (SmackDown!)
Referees	Jim Korderas (SmackDown!)
Referees	Nick Patrick (SmackDown!)
General managers	Eric Bischoff (Raw)
General managers	Paul Heyman (SmackDown!)

=== Pre-show ===
Before the event aired live on pay-per-view, Victoria defeated Molly Holly by pinning her after a Gory Neckbreaker, which Victoria calls Widow's Peak. The match aired live on Heat.

=== Preliminary matches ===
The actual event opened with Evolution (Batista and Ric Flair) defending the World Tag Team Championship against the Dudley Boyz (Bubba Ray Dudley and D-Von Dudley) in a tables match. Jonathan Coachman interfered in the match as he distracted The Dudley Boyz, who attempted a Whassup on Coachman but Flair prevented the move. D-Von performed a Clothesline on Flair, allowing Batista to perform a Spinebuster through a table on D-Von to retain the titles.

Next, Rey Mysterio defended the WWE Cruiserweight Championship against Jamie Noble. Noble's manager Nidia held Noble's legs, thinking he was Mysterio. Mysterio took advantage and performed a 619 and Droppin' Da Dime on Noble to retain the title.

After that, Eddie Guerrero faced Chavo Guerrero. Chavo Guerrero Sr. interfered and attacked Eddie throughout the match. Eddie performed the Three Amigos and a Frog Splash on Chavo to win the match. After the match, Eddie attacked Chavo and Chavo Sr., causing Chavo to bleed.

=== Main event matches ===
In the fourth match, Brock Lesnar defended the WWE Championship against Hardcore Holly. Holly performed an Alabama Slam on Lesnar and applied a Full Nelson on Lesnar. After the two rolled out of the ring, Lesnar broke the hold by performing a Hangman on Holly. Lesnar performed an F5 on Holly to retain the title.

In the fifth match, Triple H defended the World Heavyweight Championship against Shawn Michaels in a Last Man Standing match. Triple H attempted a Pedigree onto a steel chair on Michaels but Michaels countered and dropped Triple H onto the steel chair. Michaels attempted Sweet Chin Music on Triple H, but Triple H low blowed Michaels. Triple H performed a DDT and a Pedigree on Michaels, but Michaels stood at a 9 count. Michaels performed Sweet Chin Music on Triple H but fell himself, resulting in the match ending in a draw and Triple H retained the title.

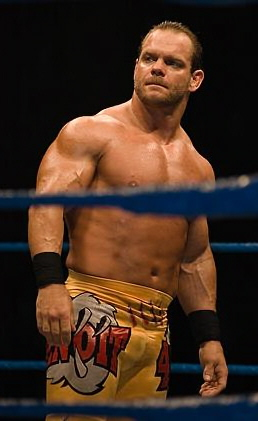
Chris Benoit, the first Royal Rumble match entrant, eventually going on to win the match and the World Heavyweight Championship at WrestleMania XX.

The main event was the annual 30-man Royal Rumble match, where the winner would get to wrestle the world champion of their choice at WrestleMania XX. Chris Benoit and Randy Orton were the first two entrants. As the match started, Benoit and Orton battled each other until Mark Henry entered at #3 and began attacking both Benoit and Orton. Tajiri entered at #4 and performed a Handspring Back Elbow on Orton. Orton battled Henry and Benoit battled Tajiri until Bradshaw entered at #5 and began dominating all the participants by finishing off Orton, then Henry, then Tajiri, with three consecutive Clotheslines from Hell. Bradshaw attempted to perform a Clothesline from Hell on Benoit, but Benoit countered it into a Crippler Crossface. Bradshaw got out of the hold by picking Benoit up and tossing him over the top rope. However, Benoit jumped on the apron and eliminated Bradshaw instead. Rhyno entered at #6 and attacked Orton, before focusing on Benoit. Tajiri battled Henry and applied a Tarantula on Henry. Rhyno performed a Spinebuster on Benoit and attempted to perform a Gore on Benoit but Benoit avoided the move and Rhyno instead crashed a rope hung Tajiri. This caused Tajiri to get eliminated from the match. Benoit then tossed Henry over the top rope, eliminating him.

Matt Hardy entered at #7, but was quickly tossed over the top rope by Benoit but Hardy landed on the apron. Rhyno tried to eliminate Hardy but Hardy stayed in the ring. Scott Steiner entered at #8 and started dominating all of the participants of the match. Hardy and Orton battled in the corner, where Hardy had nearly eliminated Orton until Benoit attacked Hardy and Orton was saved from being eliminated. Matt Morgan entered at #9 and he performed a Sitout Powerbomb on Benoit and a Big Boot on Hardy. The Hurricane entered at #10 and performed a Diving Crossbody on Hardy. The Hurricane then began fighting Morgan, who dominated The Hurricane and eliminated him by tossing him over the top rope. Morgan then tried to eliminate Hardy in the same way, but Hardy landed on the apron and stayed in the ring. Benoit began fighting Rhyno, Steiner battled Orton and Hardy battled Morgan until Booker T entered at #11. Booker T attacked Steiner and then performed a Scissors Kick on Orton. Booker T then eliminated Steiner from the match. Kane entered at #12. Morgan started attacking Kane but Kane performed a Chokeslam on Morgan. Kane performed a Big Boot on Rhyno and then Kane chokeslammed Orton. Eventually, The Undertaker's entrance theme music began playing in the arena and the lights went out. When the lights came back, Kane was distracted and Booker T eliminated Kane from behind.

Following Kane's elimination, Spike Dudley entered at #13. Kane was angered at it and he thought that it was Dudley, who played The Undertaker's gong. An enraged Kane performed a Chokeslam on Dudley on the ramp and Dudley was knocked out which meant that he was unable to participate in the Royal Rumble. Rikishi entered at #14. Along with Rikishi's entrance, Benoit backdropped Rhyno over the top rope, eliminating him. Rikishi started attacking Hardy and performed a Stink Face on Morgan. René Duprée entered at #15 and started battling Hardy before dropkicking him over the top rope to eliminate him. However, after eliminating Hardy, Duprée was eliminated himself by Rikishi when Rikishi performed a Savate Kick on Duprée, causing him to fall over the top rope. A-Train entered at #16 and began attacking Rikishi. Benoit eventually eliminated Morgan. Orton began dominating the match as he eliminated Rikishi and then backdropped Booker T over the top rope to eliminate him. Benoit battled A-Train, while Shelton Benjamin entered at #17. Benoit eliminated A-Train and Benjamin tried to perform a Superkick on Orton, but Orton ducked the move and eliminated Benjamin. The first two entrants of the match, Benoit and Orton were left remaining. Ernest Miller entered at #18, along with his manager Lamont. Instead of using the opportunity of eliminating the knocked out Benoit and Orton, Miller and his manager Lamont danced to Miller's entrance theme. However, Benoit and Orton recovered and ruined the dance as Benoit tossed Lamont over the top rope and Orton eliminated Miller from the match. Following Miller's elimination, Benoit and Orton continued to battle each other.

Kurt Angle entered at #19 and began fighting Benoit while Orton recovered in the corner. Rico entered at #20 and began battling Orton. Rico performed a Roundhouse Kick on Orton while Benoit performed three consecutive German Suplexes on Angle in a row. Orton recovered and backdropped Rico over the top rope, eliminating him. Test's music began playing at #21 but Test did not appear, as he was found knocked out at backstage by some doctors and the Raw Sheriff Stone Cold Steve Austin. Austin ordered someone to replace Test and gave him the #21 entry number. This person was revealed to be Mick Foley who immediately started attacking Orton. Foley performed a Flying Clothesline on Orton, eliminating Orton and himself in the process. Foley and Orton continued to fight each other after their eliminations. Christian entered at #22 and started battling Benoit and Angle. Foley and Orton numerously attacked each other, where Foley was about to perform a mandible claw on Orton until Nunzio entered at #23 and Foley turned his focus on Nunzio and performed a Mandible Claw on Nunzio, knocking him down. Orton attacked Foley and then retreated to the backstage. Angle battled Christian and Benoit in the ring while Nunzio sat in the ringside, instead of entering the ring. Big Show entered at #24 and began dominating the participants in the match.

Chris Jericho entered at #25 and started fighting Angle. Big Show knocked the heads of Jericho and Christian together before battling Jericho. Christian started attacking Big Show. Benoit, Angle, Christian and Jericho tried to eliminate Big Show but failed. Charlie Haas entered at #26 and was double-teamed by Jericho and Christian. Jericho eventually eliminated Christian. Billy Gunn entered at #27 and performed a Legdrop Bulldog, which he called Fameasser on Angle. Gunn then performed a Fameasser on Jericho and fought Big Show and Haas. John Cena entered at #28 but instead of entering the ring, he focused on Nunzio, who was sitting in the ringside. Cena tossed Nunzio into the ring and began attacking him until Big Show started attacking Cena. Big Show and Nunzio double-teamed Cena until Nunzio attempted to eliminate Big Show, but failed. Cena started attacking Big Show and tried to eliminate him while Nunzio tried to eliminate Benoit. Rob Van Dam entered at #29 and started dominating all the participants of the match. Nunzio tried to eliminate Van Dam but Haas battled Nunzio. Big Show battled Gunn and Cena performed a Fireman's Carry Takeover, which he called F-U, on Angle. Goldberg entered at #30 and performed a Spear on Big Show and then speared Gunn.

Goldberg punched several wrestlers including Angle, Jericho, Van Dam, Cena, and Haas. Nunzio jumped on Goldberg's back while Goldberg eliminated Haas from the match. Van Dam kicked Goldberg. Goldberg speared Nunzio and then clotheslined Gunn over the top rope, eliminating him. Goldberg picked up Nunzio in a Military Press and threw him over the top rope, eliminating him from the match. Goldberg started attacking Big Show, until Brock Lesnar interfered in the match and performed a F5 on Goldberg and left the ring. Goldberg was distracted and when he recovered, Angle eliminated him from behind. Benoit, Angle, Jericho, Cena and Van Dam all teamed up against Big Show when Big Show picked up Cena and Angle performed a Chop Block on Big Show. Van Dam performed a Slingshot Legdrop and followed it with a Five-Star Frog Splash on Big Show. All the five participants tried to eliminate Big Show, but Big Show shoved all of them and eliminated Cena. Van Dam attempted to perform a Monkey Flip on Big Show, but Big Show tossed him over the top rope, eliminating Van Dam, leaving Big Show, Benoit, Angle and Jericho as the final four competitors. Big Show backdropped Jericho over the top rope but Jericho landed on the apron and entered the ring. Jericho applied an Elevated Boston Crab, which he calls Walls of Jericho on Big Show. Angle attacked Jericho and Big Show picked up Jericho and eliminated him.

Big Show chokeslammed Benoit and fought Angle. Angle performed an Olympic Slam, which he calls "Angle Slam" on Big Show and then performed an Angle Slam on Benoit. Big Show eventually tried to perform a Chokeslam on Angle but Angle rolled it into an Ankle Lock. Big Show was near the ropes, and he flipped out of the Ankle Lock, causing Angle to get eliminated. Big Show landed on the apron. Benoit climbed the top rope and performed a Flying Forearm on the back of Big Show's neck, sending Big Show back into the ring. Big Show tried to perform a Chokeslam on Benoit, but Benoit countered it into a Crippler Crossface. Benoit eventually landed on the apron while applying a front headlock on Big Show. He dragged Big Show over the top rope, who flipped over and got tossed on the floor over the top rope, getting eliminated. As a result, Benoit won the Royal Rumble match and became the second person in history to win the match from the #1 spot (after Shawn Michaels in 1995 and later Edge in 2021 and Rhea Ripley in 2023). He also broke Bob Backlund's longevity record in 1993 by staying in the match for 1:01:30. This also made Big Show become the first two-time runner up in the Royal Rumble match, after coming second place in 2000.

== Aftermath ==
On the following night's episode of Raw, during a confrontation between Triple H and Shawn Michaels, the Raw Sheriff "Stone Cold" Steve Austin intervened and announced that even though he could not make a match between the two (Austin having lost his Co-General Manager powers at Survivor Series in November), he would "uphold the law" and announced that Michaels would not get the next shot at Triple H because he did not win the Royal Rumble. Austin revealed that the Royal Rumble winner would face "the champion" at WrestleMania XX, but that there was no specification as to which champion— thus, creating a loophole that Chris Benoit, who was then property of SmackDown!, exploited to announce that he would join the Raw brand and instead chase the World Heavyweight Championship due in part to bad feelings between himself and SmackDown! General Manager Paul Heyman. On the February 9 episode, Benoit and Triple H were to have their contract signing for the WrestleMania match, but Michaels interfered and hit Sweet Chin Music on Benoit then signed the contract himself. The following week, after Michaels defeated Benoit in a singles match, Austin announced that Triple H would defend the title against Benoit and Michaels in a triple threat match at WrestleMania. At WrestleMania, Benoit defeated Michaels and Triple H by submitting the latter to the Crippler Crossface to win the World Heavyweight Championship. Benoit's defection led to a rule change for the Royal Rumble winner, where he could now choose which world champion he would face at WrestleMania.

=== SmackDown! Royal Rumble ===
Meanwhile, on SmackDown!, in order to make up for Benoit's defection, Heyman announced that a second Royal Rumble match featuring fifteen of SmackDown!'s wrestlers competing for a shot at Brock Lesnar's WWE Championship at No Way Out in February. The thirteen SmackDown! wrestlers (Kurt Angle, Rhyno, Charlie Haas, Shelton Benjamin, Bradshaw, Ernest Miller, Tajiri, Billy Gunn, Big Show, John Cena, Nunzio, A-Train, and Rikishi) who competed in the original Royal Rumble match were given entries in the match as were Hardcore Holly and Eddie Guerrero (Holly, who replaced an injured Matt Morgan, wrestled and lost to Lesnar at the Rumble and Guerrero, who replaced Benoit, was continuing his feud with Chavo). Guerrero won the match and earned the title opportunity. At No Way Out, Guerrero defeated Lesnar to win the WWE Championship.

Draw	Entrant	Order	Eliminated by	Time	Eliminations
1	Kurt Angle	14	Guerrero	34:14	6
2	Rhyno	5	Angle	13:59	0
3	Charlie Haas	9	Guerrero	20:54	1
4	Shelton Benjamin	10	Angle	19:29	0
5	Bradshaw	3	Big Show	06:59	0
6	Ernest Miller	1	Angle	00:42	0
7	Tajiri	2	Big Show	03:46	0
8	Billy Gunn	12	Guerrero	14:55	1
9	Big Show	8	Angle, Gunn, Guerrero, Haas, Holly, Rikishi, Cena	09:22	3
10	John Cena	7	Big Show	06:09	2
11	Nunzio	4	Cena	00:52	0
12	A-Train	6	Guerrero	02:43	0
13	Eddie Guerrero	-	Winner	17:44	6
14	Rikishi	13	Guerrero and Angle	08:17	1
15	Hardcore Holly	11	Angle	04:00	1

=== Impact of Benoit tragedy ===
Chris Benoit murdered his wife and son before committing suicide over the weekend of June 22–24, 2007. Once the details of Benoit's actions became apparent, WWE made the decision to remove nearly all mentions of Benoit from their website, future broadcasts, and all publications. As a result, this Royal Rumble and Benoit's victory is often ignored in official publications. When referring to the #1 entrant, WWE personalities occasionally stated, for instance, "two people have won from the number one position, including Hall of Famer Shawn Michaels in 1995", as commentator John "Bradshaw" Layfield (JBL) did in 2015. Edge and Rhea Ripley would since become the third and fourth wrestlers to win as the first entrant in 2021 and 2023, respectively, which WWE acknowledged they were the third and fourth to do so, but only mentioned Shawn Michaels as the other to accomplish this. Coverage of the Royal Rumble has been very selective; no photos of Benoit exist on WWE's webpage for the event, focusing rather on the Last Man Standing match between Triple H and Shawn Michaels, and Benoit is only mentioned on the results page as the winner of the event. Only a few WWE video features include footage from the Royal Rumble match, but those that do use careful shot selection so that Benoit is not seen on screen. WWE's website has also posted photo galleries dedicated to the number one entrants and winners in the Royal Rumble history, both of which completely ignore Chris Benoit and the year of 2004. The pay-per-view and the Royal Rumble match, however, exist in their entirety on WWE's streaming services unedited. Benoit went on to win the World Heavyweight Championship at WrestleMania XX (which like this Rumble, it is also available in its entirety on WWE's streaming services unedited), but like his near erasure from this Royal Rumble, WWE only lists his name in the official title history but have removed the match description (this is also the case for any other WWE-owned title that he has won), as well as the match description for when Randy Orton defeated him for the World Heavyweight Championship at SummerSlam.

== Results ==
No.	Results	Stipulations	Times
1^{H}	Victoria (with Steven Richards) defeated Molly Holly by pinfall	Singles match	4:58
2	Evolution (Batista and Ric Flair) (c) defeated The Dudley Boyz (Bubba Ray Dudley and D-Von Dudley)	Tables match for the World Tag Team Championship	4:22
3	Rey Mysterio (c) defeated Jamie Noble (with Nidia) by pinfall	Singles match for the WWE Cruiserweight Championship	3:12
4	Eddie Guerrero defeated Chavo Guerrero (with Chavo Guerrero Sr.) by pinfall	Singles match	8:04
5	Brock Lesnar (c) defeated Hardcore Holly by pinfall	Singles match for the WWE Championship	6:30
6	Triple H (c) vs. Shawn Michaels ended in a draw	Last Man Standing match for the World Heavyweight Championship	22:47
7	Chris Benoit won by last eliminating Big Show	30-man Royal Rumble match for a world championship match at WrestleMania XX	1:01:31
(c) / – the champion(s) heading into the match; H / – the match was broadcast prior to the pay-per-view on Sunday Night Heat

=== Royal Rumble entrances and eliminations ===
– Raw
– SmackDown!
– Winner

Draw	Entrant	Brand	Order eliminated	Eliminated by	Time	Eliminations
1	Chris Benoit	SmackDown!	—	Winner	1:01:31 (Note: Chris Benoit broke the longevity record for lasting 1:01:31, previous record held by Bob Backlund (lasting 1:01:10) in 1993. This record would stand for two years before it would be broken by Rey Mysterio (lasting 1:02:15) in 2006.)	6
2	Randy Orton	Raw	19	Mick Foley	33:44	5
3	Mark Henry	Raw	3	Chris Benoit	05:14	1
4	Tajiri	SmackDown!	2	Rhyno	03:39	0
5	Bradshaw	SmackDown!	1	Chris Benoit	00:38	0
6	Rhyno	SmackDown!	8	Chris Benoit	14:00	1
7	Matt Hardy	Raw	9	René Duprée	14:18	0
8	Scott Steiner	Raw	5	Booker T	06:49	0
9	Matt Morgan	SmackDown!	11	Chris Benoit	12:14	1
10	The Hurricane	Raw	4	Matt Morgan	00:19	0
11	Booker T	Raw	13	Randy Orton	09:11	2
12	Kane	Raw	6	Booker T	01:40	0
13	Spike Dudley (Note: Spike Dudley was attacked by Kane before he made it to the ring, and therefore was unable to compete and never officially entered the match.)	Raw	7	Unable to compete	00:00	0
14	Rikishi	SmackDown!	12	Randy Orton	03:48	1
15	René Duprée	Raw	10	Rikishi	00:33	1
16	A-Train	SmackDown!	14	Chris Benoit	01:44	0
17	Shelton Benjamin	SmackDown!	15	Randy Orton	00:37	0
18	Ernest Miller	SmackDown!	16	Randy Orton	00:56	0
19	Kurt Angle	SmackDown!	28	Big Show	29:04	1
20	Rico	Raw	17	Randy Orton	01:06	0
21 (Note: Test was originally the 21st entrant but he was found unconscious and replaced by Mick Foley.)	Mick Foley	Raw	18	Himself	00:43	2
22	Christian	Raw	20	Chris Jericho	07:39	0
23	Nunzio	SmackDown!	23	Goldberg	03:48	0
24	Big Show	SmackDown!	29	Chris Benoit	22:38	4
25	Chris Jericho	Raw	27	Big Show	14:58	1
26	Charlie Haas	SmackDown!	21	Goldberg and Rob Van Dam	06:53	0
27	Billy Gunn	SmackDown!	22	Goldberg	05:37	0
28	John Cena	SmackDown!	25	Big Show	07:37	0
29	Rob Van Dam	Raw	26	Big Show	06:48	1
30	Goldberg	Raw	24	Kurt Angle	02:04	3
