= Survivor Series (2003) =

World Wrestling Entertainment pay-per-view event

- Promotional poster featuring Shane McMahon
- Promotion: World Wrestling Entertainment
- Brand(s): Raw; SmackDown!
- Date: November 16, 2003
- City: Dallas, Texas
- Venue: American Airlines Center
- Attendance: 13,487
- Buy rate: 450,000
- Tagline: A Fall from Grace

Pay-per-view chronology
← Previous; No Mercy	Next → Armageddon

Survivor Series chronology
← Previous; 2002	Next → 2004

The 2003 Survivor Series was a professional wrestling pay-per-view (PPV) event produced by World Wrestling Entertainment (WWE). It was the 17th annual Survivor Series and took place on November 16, 2003, at the American Airlines Center in Dallas, Texas, held for wrestlers from the promotion's Raw and SmackDown! brand divisions. The event was highlighted by the titular Survivor Series match, a tag team elimination match that pits teams of multiple wrestlers against each other.

Seven matches were held at the event, including two Survivor Series matches. There was also one match taped before the event for Sunday Night Heat. The main event was the main match on the Raw brand and was for the World Heavyweight Championship between Goldberg and Triple H, which Goldberg won by pinfall after performing a Spear and Jackhammer. The predominant match on the SmackDown! brand was a Buried Alive match between The Undertaker and Mr. McMahon, which Vince won after Kane interfered and helped Vince bury The Undertaker. This would be The Undertaker's last appearance portraying the American Badass/Big Evil gimmick until over 16 years later at WrestleMania 36 in 2020, as he would return four months later at WrestleMania XX in his Deadman persona for the first time since late-1999. The predominant match on the Raw brand was a traditional Survivor Series match between Team Bischoff (Chris Jericho, Christian, Randy Orton, Scott Steiner, and Mark Henry) and Team Austin (Shawn Michaels, Rob Van Dam, Booker T, Bubba Ray Dudley, and D-Von Dudley). Team Bischoff won the match after Orton last eliminated Michaels, following interference from Batista. Another notable match featured an ambulance match between Kane and Shane McMahon, which Kane won after throwing Shane into the ambulance.

== Production ==
=== Background ===
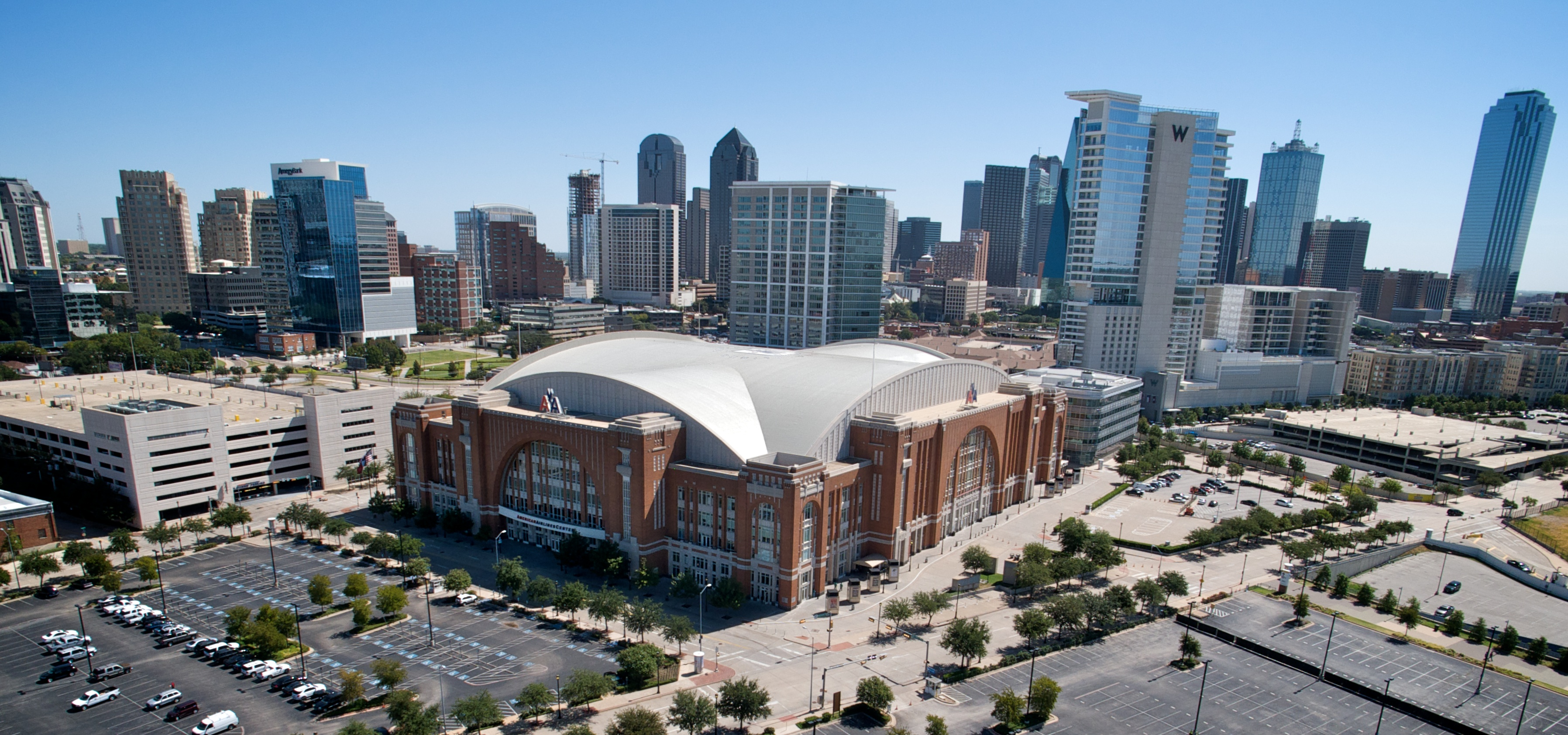
The event was held at the American Airlines Center in Dallas, Texas.

Survivor Series is an annual professional wrestling pay-per-view (PPV) event, produced every November by World Wrestling Entertainment (WWE) since 1987, generally held around Thanksgiving in the United States. In what has become the second longest-running pay-per-view event in history (behind WWE's WrestleMania), it is one of the promotion's original four pay-per-views, along with WrestleMania, SummerSlam, and Royal Rumble, referred to as the "Big Four". The event is traditionally characterized by having Survivor Series matches, which are tag team elimination matches that typically pits teams of four or five wrestlers against each other. The 17th Survivor Series was scheduled to be held on November 16, 2003, at the American Airlines Center in Dallas, Texas and featured wrestlers from the Raw and SmackDown! brands.

=== Storylines ===
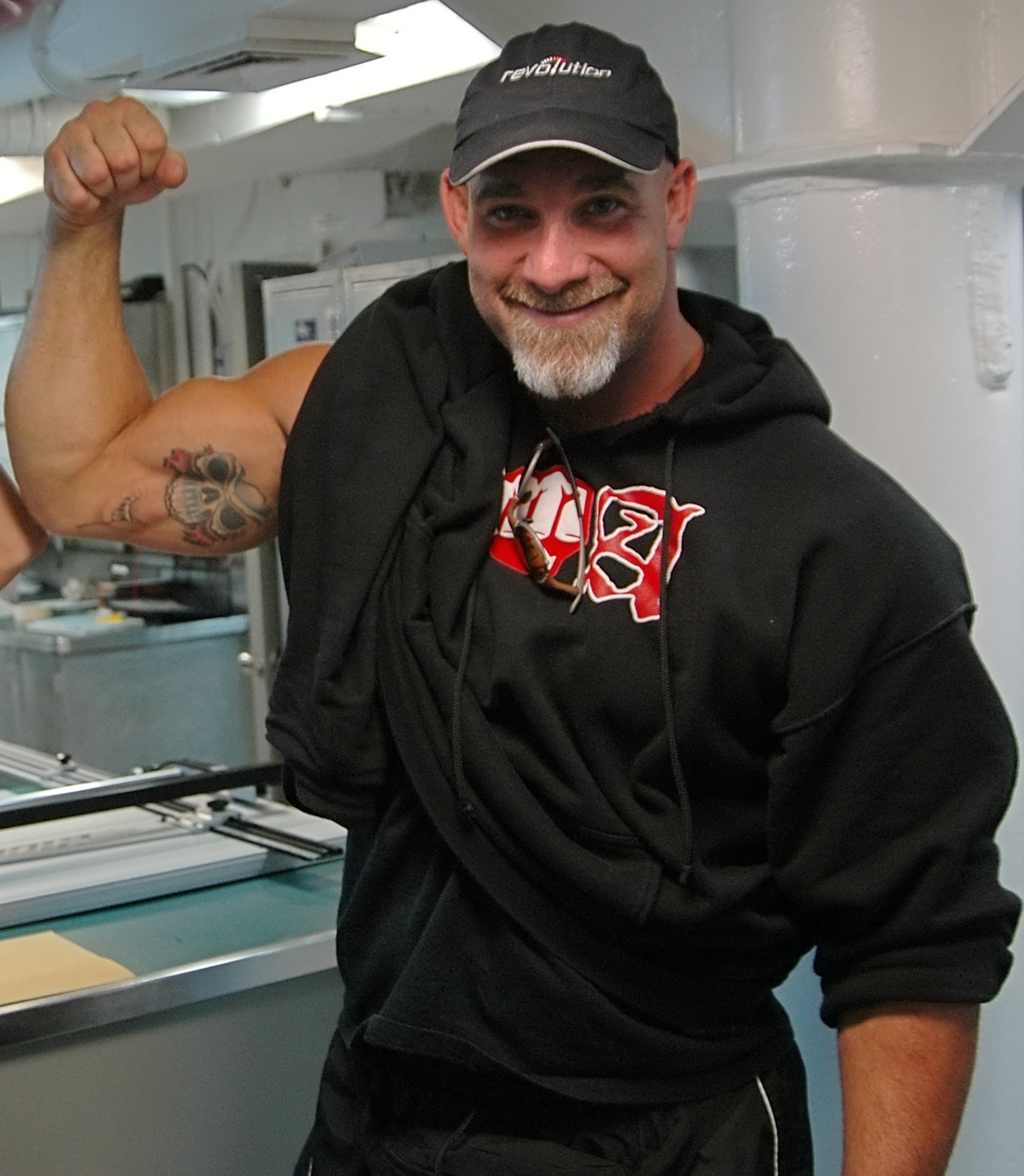
Goldberg defended the World Heavyweight Championship at Survivor Series

The event featured seven professional wrestling matches with outcomes predetermined by WWE script writers. The matches featured wrestlers portraying their characters in planned storylines that took place before, during, and after the event. All wrestlers were from one of WWE's brands – Raw and SmackDown! – while storylines played out on their weekly television shows, Raw and SmackDown!.

The main feud on the Raw brand was between Goldberg and Triple H, with the two feuding over the World Heavyweight Championship. At SummerSlam, Triple H and Goldberg were involved in the Elimination Chamber match for the World Heavyweight Championship. After Goldberg eliminated three other men in that match, he went after Triple H. At the end, Goldberg attempted another Spear on Triple H, who countered the maneuver by hitting Goldberg in the head with a sledgehammer for the win. On the August 25 episode of Raw, Goldberg issued a one-on-one challenge to Triple H. Triple H came out and stated that he would defend the World Heavyweight Championship against Goldberg at Unforgiven. Triple H added the stipulation that should Goldberg lose, he would retire from professional wrestling. At Unforgiven, Goldberg defeated Triple H when he performed a Jackhammer to win the title. On the September 29 episode of Raw, Triple H made an announcement, offering a bounty of $100,000 to anyone who could successfully "take out" Goldberg. The first person that attempted to take the bounty was Steven Richards, but Goldberg quickly took him out. Many other people tried and failed to take him out including La Résistance, Mark Henry and Tommy Dreamer. It was during a World Heavyweight Championship match between Goldberg and Shawn Michaels on the October 20 episode of Raw, however, that he was taken out. Batista ran-in, dragged Michaels out of the ring and, in storyline, assaulted him. Batista then entered the ring, and proceeded to attack Goldberg. He put a folding chair around Goldberg's ankle, before jumping off the middle rope onto the chair, in storyline, "shattering" Goldberg's ankle. Evolution then made their way to the ring, and gave the $100,000 bounty to Batista. With Goldberg seemingly out of action, Raw Co-General Manager Eric Bischoff looked set to present Triple H with the World Heavyweight Championship on the October 27 episode of Raw. The other Co-General Manager of Raw, "Stone Cold" Steve Austin came to the ring, however, and announced that Goldberg would be back to face Triple H for the World Heavyweight Championship at Survivor Series. Goldberg got his revenge on Batista on the November 3 episode of Raw as he performed a spear to Batista. He attempted to injure Batista using the same technique that Batista used on Goldberg. Ric Flair tried to intervene, but he too got speared. Austin then announced that Batista and Goldberg would go one-on-one. On the November 10 episode of Raw, Goldberg looked set to beat Batista, but Triple H interfered, signaling a Disqualification. Triple H got his signature Sledgehammer out from underneath the ring, and looked set to attack Goldberg with it, but Goldberg managed to fight back, and speared Triple H. Goldberg picked up the sledgehammer, and attacked Batista with it.

The main feud on the SmackDown! brand was between WWE Chairman Mr. McMahon and The Undertaker. At No Mercy, McMahon interfered in a WWE Championship Biker Chain match between the champion Brock Lesnar and The Undertaker, helping Lesnar retain the title. Earlier, McMahon defeated his daughter Stephanie McMahon in an "I Quit" match. Due to a pre-match stipulation between the two, Stephanie had to quit her job as SmackDown! General Manager. On the October 23 episode of SmackDown!, McMahon announced Paul Heyman as the new SmackDown! General Manager. In his first act, Heyman booked a handicap match, with The Undertaker facing Lesnar and Big Show, with the stipulation that if The Undertaker won, he could choose to face any superstar at any event. Heyman put many stipulations in The Undertaker's way during the bout, but despite this and taking a huge beating, The Undertaker won the match. The Undertaker told McMahon that he would be competing in a Buried Alive match at Survivor Series against McMahon. On the October 30 episode of SmackDown!, Heyman announced that he had given The Undertaker time off until Survivor Series, which made McMahon very unhappy. McMahon stated that he would "burn down Undertaker's house and order Undertaker's wife to be gang raped" if Heyman didn't do anything about the Buried Alive match. Both The Undertaker and McMahon were interviewed on the November 6 episode of SmackDown!. In his promo, The Undertaker stated that the feud with McMahon was personal. He went on to say that McMahon respected nobody and that McMahon respected his family much less. Later, McMahon asked for forgiveness from the fans for his actions over the past few months.

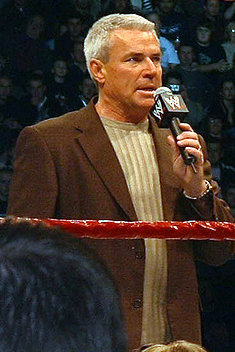
Eric Bischoff, leader of Team Bischoff

The secondary feud from Raw brand heading into the event was between the two Co-General Managers on Raw, Stone Cold Steve Austin and Eric Bischoff. Bischoff had control of the brand since July 15, 2002, but on the April 28 episode of Raw, he was forced to share his General Manager duties with Austin. Their feud over who had the most power as General Manager continued on Raw throughout the summer. On the July 21 episode of Raw, Linda McMahon put a restriction on Austin, saying that he could not physically assault the other Raw superstars unless physically provoked. On the October 20 episode of Raw, Bischoff proposed that he and Austin should face off in a traditional 5-on-5 Survivor Series match, with both selecting teams of five and the stipulation being if Austin's team were to win, then the restriction that McMahon had put on Austin previously would be null and void; however, if Bischoff's team were to win, Austin would step down as Co-General Manager of Raw. Austin promptly accepted the challenge, with Bischoff announcing the first two members of his team as Scott Steiner and Chris Jericho. Later in the night, Booker T was announced as the first member of Austin's Survivor Series team. On the October 27 episode of Raw, Rob Van Dam and the Dudley Boyz (Bubba Ray Dudley and D-Von Dudley) were named as members of Austin's team. For Team Bischoff, Christian and Mark Henry were announced as members as well. On the November 3 episode of Raw, both Austin and Bischoff announced their final members to join their respective team; Shawn Michaels accepted Austin's invitation to join his team and Bischoff announced Randy Orton as the last member to join his team. On the November 10 episode of Raw, Team Austin and Team Bischoff were scheduled four matches with Team Austin winning all four matches. In a tag team match, the Dudley Boyz defeated Steiner and Henry via disqualification, while in three singles matches, Van Dam defeated Christian, Booker defeated Jericho, and Michaels defeated Orton to get the greater advantage heading into Survivor Series.

== Event ==
Other on-screen personnel
English commentators	Jim Ross (Raw)
English commentators	Jerry Lawler (Raw)
English commentators	Michael Cole (SmackDown!)
English commentators	Tazz (SmackDown!)
Spanish commentators	Carlos Cabrera
Spanish commentators	Hugo Savinovich
Interviewer	Josh Mathews
Ring announcers	Howard Finkel (Raw)
Ring announcers	Tony Chimel (SmackDown!)
Referees	Charles Robinson (Raw)
Referees	Mike Chioda (Raw)
Referees	Jack Doan (Raw)
Referees	Chad Patton (Raw)
Referees	Nick Patrick (SmackDown!)
Referees	Earl Hebner (Raw)
Referees	Jim Korderas (SmackDown!)
Referees	Brian Hebner (SmackDown!)
Referees	Mike Sparks (SmackDown!)

Before the event aired live on pay-per-view, a Sunday Night Heat match was aired, which saw Tajiri (with Akio and Sakoda) retain the WWE Cruiserweight Championship against Jamie Noble. Tajiri pinned Noble after a Buzzsaw Kick.

=== Preliminary matches ===
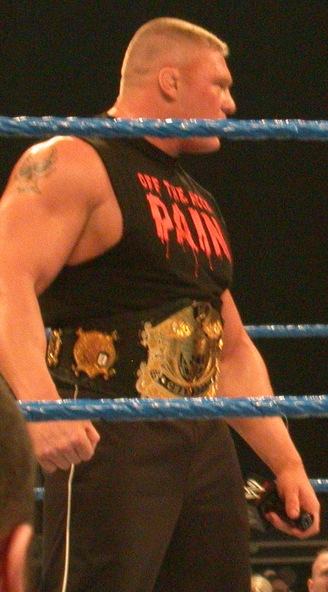
Brock Lesnar as SmackDown!'s WWE Champion

The first match of the event was the Survivor Series match with Team Angle (Kurt Angle, Chris Benoit, John Cena, Hardcore Holly, and Bradshaw) against Team Lesnar (Brock Lesnar, The Big Show, Matt Morgan, Nathan Jones, and A-Train). Holly was eliminated and got himself disqualified for pushing the referee while attacking Lesnar before the match started. A-Train was then eliminated by Bradshaw after a Clothesline From Hell. Bradshaw was then eliminated after a Chokeslam by Big Show. Matt Morgan was eliminated by Angle after an Angle Slam. Jones was eliminated by Angle after he submitted to the Ankle Lock. Angle was eliminated by Lesnar after an F-5. Lesnar was eliminated by Benoit after he submitted to the Crippler Crossface. Big Show was eliminated after a chain shot and an FU by John Cena, leaving Cena and Benoit as the survivors.

The next match was for the WWE Women's Championship between Molly Holly and Lita. After Lita missed a Litasault, Molly executed the Molly-Go-Round for a near-fall. Molly performed a drop toe hold on Lita into an exposed turnbuckle and pinned her to retain the title.

The third match was an Ambulance match between Shane McMahon and Kane. The match started on the outside, where McMahon was thrown into the steel steps by Kane. Mid-way in the match, McMahon executed a Leap of Faith through a broadcast table on Kane. McMahon hit Kane with a kendo stick and tackled Kane through a security booth with an SUV. McMahon executed a Coast-To-Coast off the roof of the ambulance on Kane. In the end, Kane executed a Tombstone Piledriver on the floor on McMahon and threw him into the ambulance to win the match.

The fourth match was between The Basham Brothers (Doug Basham and Danny Basham) and Los Guerreros (Eddie Guerrero and Chavo Guerrero) for the WWE Tag Team Championship. The match started on the outside. Los Guerreros attacked Shaniqua, who tried to interfere. After Chavo accidentally attacked Eddie, Danny pinned Chavo with a roll-up to win the match for his team.

=== Main event matches ===
The fifth match was the second Survivor Series match with Team Bischoff (Chris Jericho, Christian, Randy Orton, Scott Steiner, and Mark Henry) against Team Austin (Shawn Michaels, Rob Van Dam, Booker T, Bubba Ray Dudley, and D-Von Dudley). Steiner was eliminated by Booker T after a Book-end. Booker T was eliminated by Henry after a World's Strongest Slam. Henry was eliminated by Van Dam and The Dudley Boyz after a 3-D from Bubba Ray and D-Von and Five-Star Frog splash. Van Dam was eliminated by Orton after an RKO. D-Von was eliminated by Jericho after a Flashback. Bubba Ray was eliminated by Christian after an Unprettier. Christian was eliminated by Michaels after Sweet Chin Music. Jericho was eliminated after Michaels countered the Walls of Jericho into a Cradle. After the referee was knocked down and Austin brawled with Bischoff in the entrance way, Batista interfered and executed a Batista Bomb on Michaels. Orton pinned Michaels to win the match, leaving Orton as the sole survivor and meaning Austin lost his position as Co-General Manager of Raw. Austin would make a farewell speech as the commentary team acknowledged that his career was officially over despite the fact that his match at WrestleMania 19 was the last match of his career.

The match that followed was the Buried Alive match between The Undertaker and Mr. McMahon. The Undertaker punched McMahon, resulting in McMahon bleeding. The Undertaker hit McMahon in the head with one of the shovels. After The Undertaker assaulted McMahon, he carried him to the grave site. McMahon hit The Undertaker with a shovel, which resulted in The Undertaker falling to the grave site, but he pulled McMahon into it. The Undertaker climbed to a front loader but an explosion knocked him out. Kane interfered, attacked The Undertaker and threw him into the grave. McMahon operated the front loader and dumped all the dirt from it to bury The Undertaker and win the match.

The main event was between Goldberg and Triple H for the World Heavyweight Championship. In the match, Triple H focused on Goldberg's injured ankle. Ric Flair, Randy Orton and Batista all interfered on behalf of Triple H; however, Goldberg hit Flair, Orton and Batista with a sledgehammer, which was brought in by Triple H. The match came to an end when Goldberg executed a Spear and Jackhammer on Triple H to retain the title.

== Aftermath ==
The Undertaker would return at WrestleMania XX as his "Phenom" gimmick and defeated Kane.

The following month at Armageddon, Triple H would win the World Heavyweight Championship from Goldberg in a triple threat match also involving Kane. Randy Orton would also win the Intercontinental Championship from Rob Van Dam and Ric Flair and Batista would win the World Tag Team Championship on the same night. This meant Evolution held all the gold on Raw.

SmackDown!'s Chris Benoit would win the Royal Rumble match at the Royal Rumble, subsequently challenging and winning Raw's World Heavyweight Championship from Triple H in a triple threat match involving Shawn Michaels at WrestleMania XX. He would close the show with Eddie Guerrero in the ring as confetti rained down on them.

With "Stone Cold" Steve Austin no longer co-general manager of Raw, Eric Bischoff began a crusade to make life hell for all the superstars from Austin's Survivor Series team. When Bischoff's tyranny became out of control again, Linda McMahon hired Mick Foley to be the new co-general manager. Foley would leave after a few weeks, but Austin would return as "Sheriff" of WWE on December 29th, rehiring team member Shawn Michaels, who had just been fired by Bischoff.

WWE would do a house show tour in Australia where Nathan Jones announced he would leave WWE to stay in Australia.

== Results ==
No.	Results	Stipulations	Times
1^{H}	Tajiri (c) (with Akio and Sakoda) defeated Jamie Noble	Singles match for the WWE Cruiserweight Championship	4:13
2	Team Angle (Kurt Angle, Chris Benoit, John Cena, Hardcore Holly, and Bradshaw) defeated Team Lesnar (Brock Lesnar, Big Show, Matt Morgan, Nathan Jones, and A-Train)	5-on-5 Survivor Series match^{1}	13:17
3	Molly Holly (c) defeated Lita	Singles match for the WWE Women's Championship	6:48
4	Kane defeated Shane McMahon	Ambulance match	13:34
5	The Basham Brothers (Doug and Danny) (c) (with Shaniqua) defeated Los Guerreros (Eddie and Chavo)	Tag team match for the WWE Tag Team Championship	7:31
6	Team Bischoff (Chris Jericho, Christian, Randy Orton, Scott Steiner, and Mark Henry) (with Eric Bischoff, Stacy Keibler, and Theodore Long) defeated Team Austin (Shawn Michaels, Rob Van Dam, Booker T, Bubba Ray Dudley, and D-Von Dudley) (with "Stone Cold" Steve Austin)	5-on-5 Survivor Series match Since Team Austin lost, Austin was forced to step down as Raw Co-General Manager. Had Team Austin won, Austin's "no physicality" restriction would have been null and void.	27:27
7	Mr. McMahon defeated The Undertaker	Buried Alive match	11:49
8	Goldberg (c) defeated Triple H (with Ric Flair)	Singles match for the World Heavyweight Championship	11:44
(c) / – the champion(s) heading into the match; H / – the match was broadcast prior to the pay-per-view on Sunday Night Heat

=== Survivor Series matches ===
SmackDown! ^1

Eliminated	Wrestler	Eliminated by	Team	Method	Time
1	Hardcore Holly	N/A	Team Angle	Disqualification	0:00
2	A-Train	Bradshaw	Team Lesnar	Pinfall	0:27
3	Bradshaw	Big Show	Team Angle	Pinfall	0:48
4	Matt Morgan	Kurt Angle	Team Lesnar	Pinfall	9:11
5	Nathan Jones	Kurt Angle	Team Lesnar	Submission	9:31
6	Kurt Angle	Brock Lesnar	Team Angle	Pinfall	9:43
7	Brock Lesnar	Chris Benoit	Team Lesnar	Submission	11:43
8	Big Show	John Cena	Team Lesnar	Pinfall	13:15
Survivor(s):	John Cena and Chris Benoit (Team Angle)				

Raw ^2

Eliminated	Wrestler	Eliminated by	Team	Method	Time
1	Scott Steiner	Booker T	Team Bischoff	Pinfall	7:28
2	Booker T	Mark Henry	Team Austin	Pinfall	7:49
3	Mark Henry	Rob Van Dam, D-Von Dudley, Bubba Ray Dudley	Team Bischoff	Pinfall	10:03
4	Rob Van Dam	Randy Orton	Team Austin	Pinfall	12:06
5	D-Von Dudley	Chris Jericho	Team Austin	Pinfall	13:49
6	Bubba Ray Dudley	Christian	Team Austin	Pinfall	16:53
7	Christian	Shawn Michaels	Team Bischoff	Pinfall	20:28
8	Chris Jericho	Shawn Michaels	Team Bischoff	Pinfall	23:54
9	Shawn Michaels	Randy Orton	Team Austin	Pinfall	27:27
Sole Survivor:	Randy Orton (Team Bischoff)				
