= List of former Juggalo Championship Wrestling personnel =

This is a list of former employees of the professional wrestling promotion Juggalo Championship Wrestling (JCW), formerly called Juggalo Championshit Wrestling or Juggalo Championshxt Wrestling. On December 19, 1999, JCW was launched and released several DVDs in the following years. In the early days of the company, talents often only appeared a couple of times before disappearing, or wrestlers accepted bookings with other companies, resulting in extended absences from JCW.

The talents consisted of a mix of rappers, independent wrestlers, and well known names from promotions such as World Wrestling Federation (now World Wrestling Entertainment), Extreme Championship Wrestling, and World Championship Wrestling, with many of them performing under pseudonyms or parody alternate-names. JCW began broadcasting the internet wrestling show SlamTV! on April 7, 2007. The show instituted a change in JCW's roster, with the promotion focusing on independent and hardcore wrestlers, while also bringing in established names on a consistent basis.

This list is organized alphabetically by the wrestlers' real names. In the case of wrestlers who have had multiple stints in the company, the date of their last appearance is used.

== Alumni ==
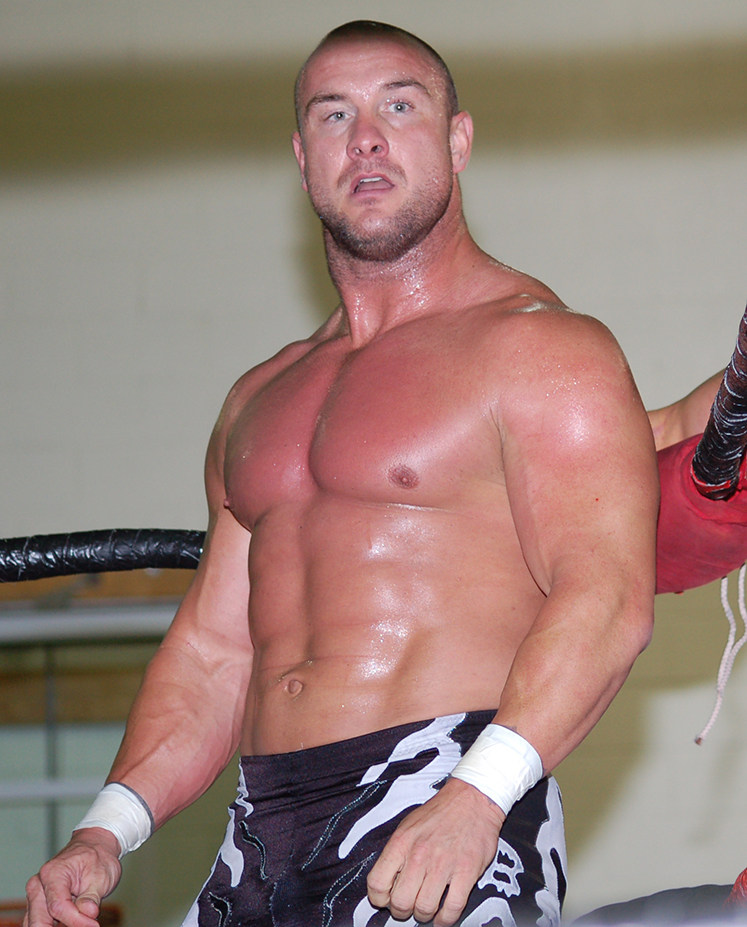
Doug Basham

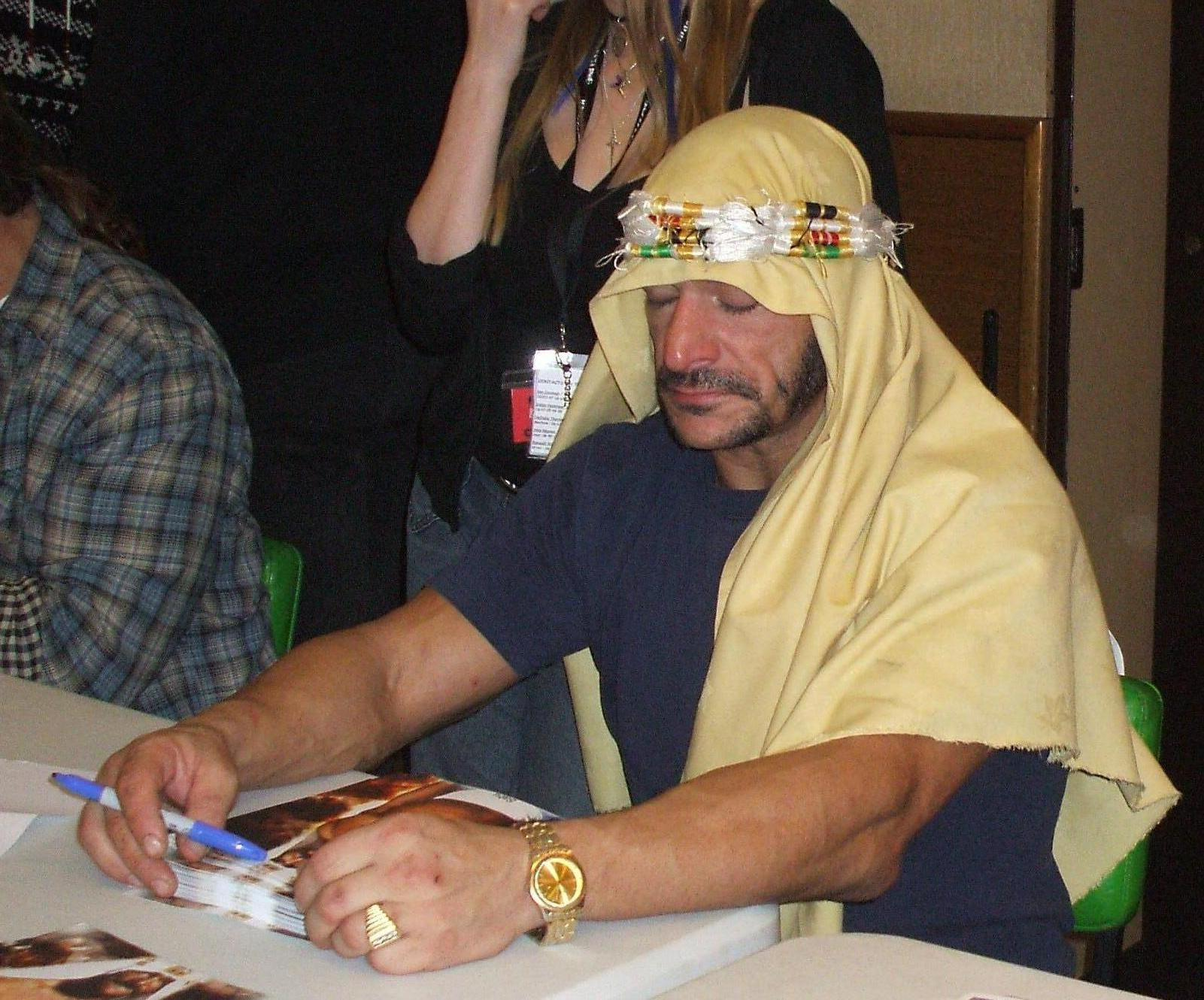
Sabu

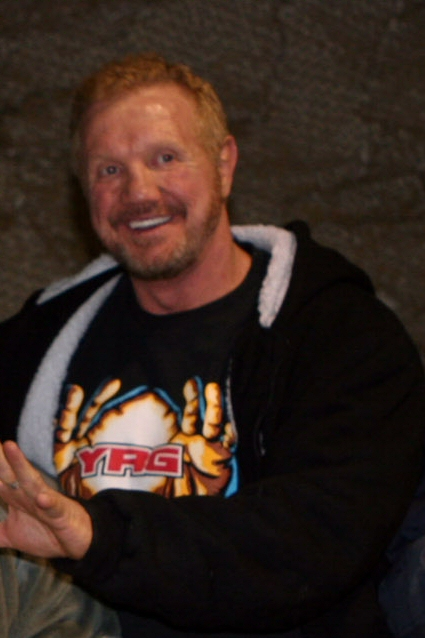
Diamond Dallas Page

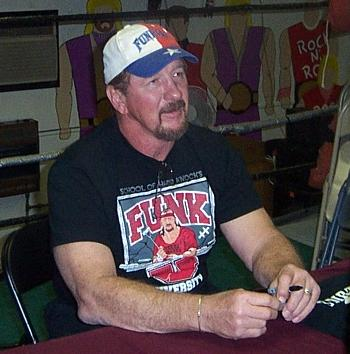
Terry Funk

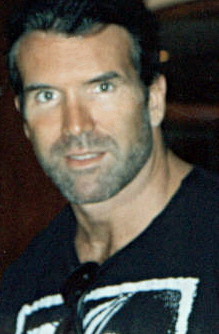
Scott Hall

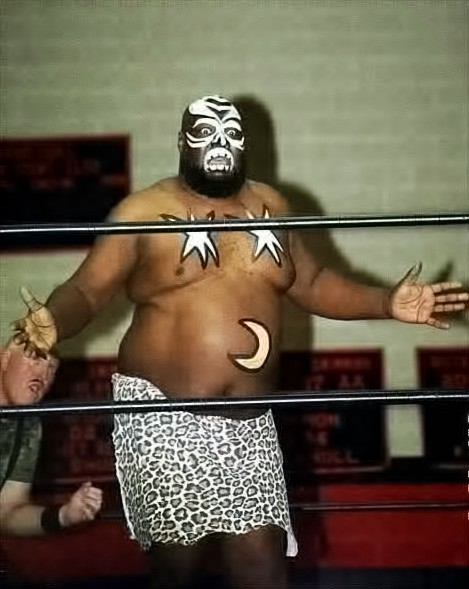
Kamala

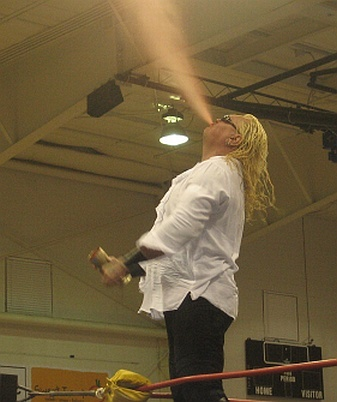
Gangrel

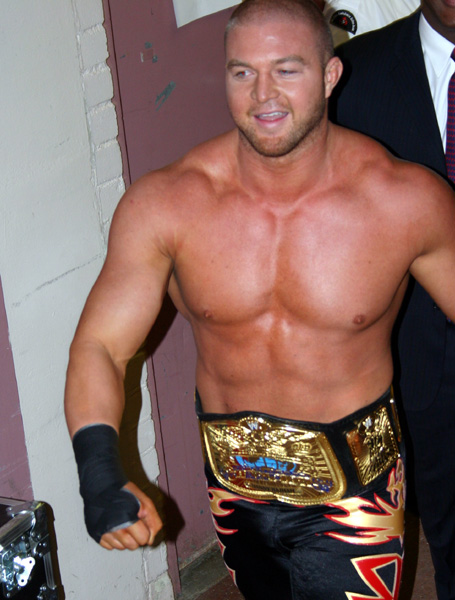
Damaja

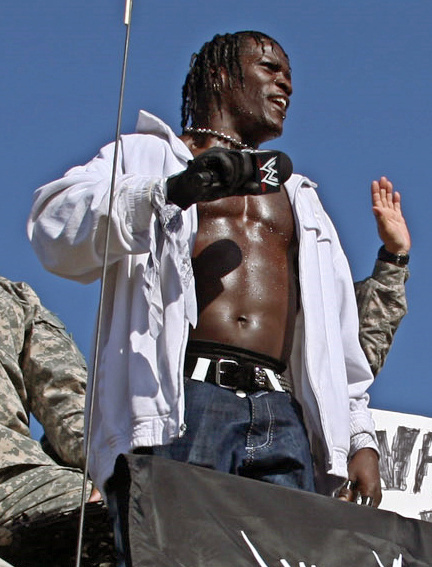
Ron Killings

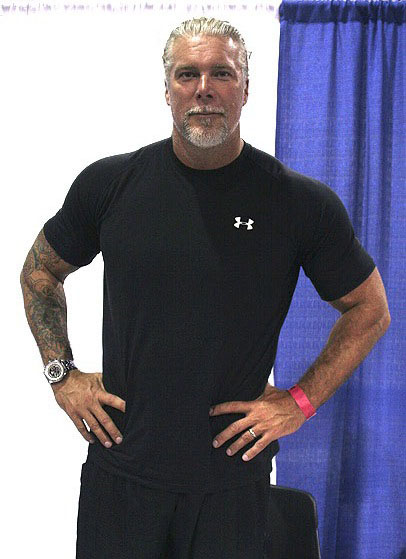
Kevin Nash

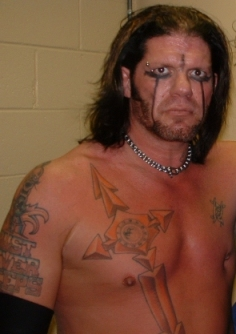
Raven

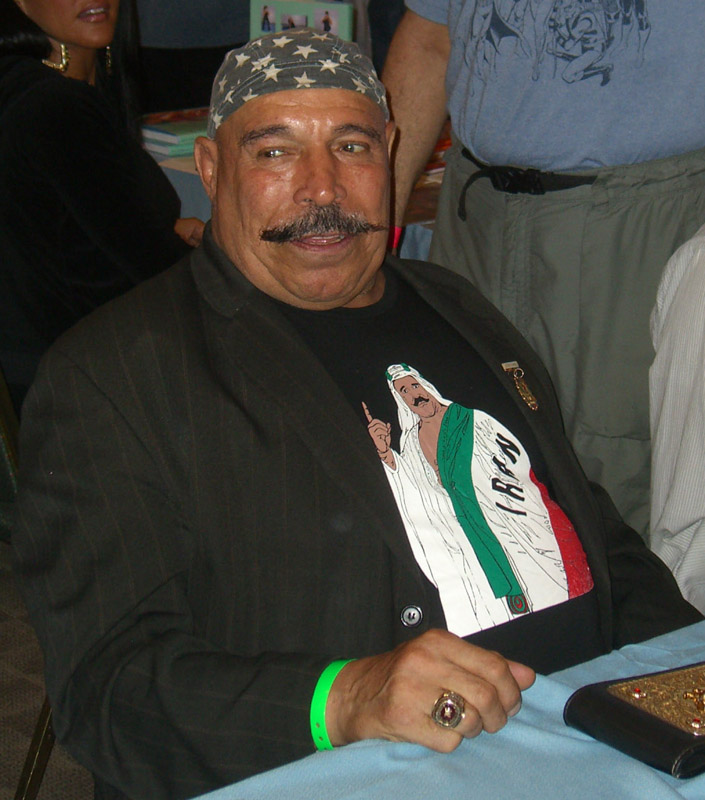
The Iron Sheik

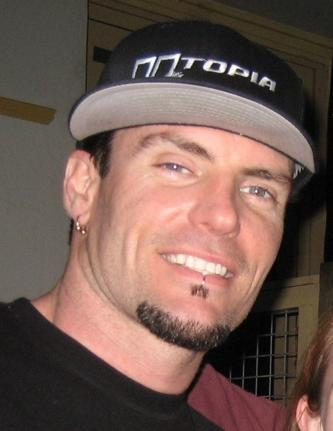
Vanilla Ice

Trent Acid

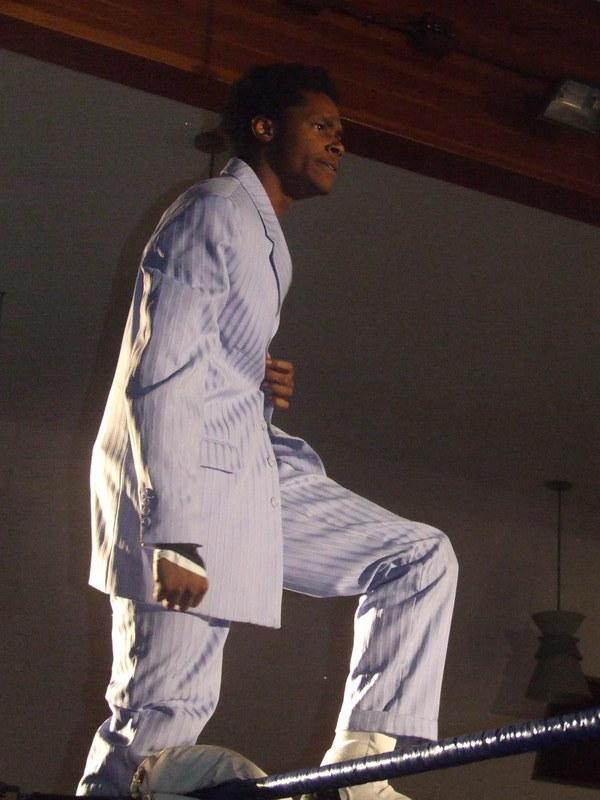
Human Tornado

=== Male wrestlers ===
Name:	Ring name(s):	Tenure(s):
Lloyd Anoa'i	Alofa	2007
Samula Anoa'i	Samu	2007
Joe Applebaumer	Pogo the Clown	2007
Yoshihiro Asai	Último Dragón	2007
Robert Backlund	Bob Backlund	2011
Lyle Basham, Jr.	Doug Basham	2007-2008
James Black	James Storm	2004; 2005
Masanori Murakawa	Great Sasuke	2025
Matthew Brett Cardona	Matt Cardona	2025
Montaque Brown	Monty Brown	2004; 2005
Robert Bruce	Evil Dead	1999-2005
Terry Brunk	Sabu	2001-2009; 2011
Bradley Cain	Lodi	2002
Ruben Cain	Robert Gibson	1999; 2011-2012
Christopher Candito^{†}	Chris Candido	2002
Matthew Capiccioni	M-Dogg 20	2003; 2013-2016; 2024-2025
Leonard Carlson	Lenny Lane	2002; 2005
David Cash	Kid Cock; Kid Kash	2003–2005
Carlos Colón, Jr.	Carlito	2011-2012
Chucky Dail	Suburban Gangsta	1999
Dougie Dail	Neil; Redneck Devil without a Cause	1999
William Dail	Billy Bill	2000
Jason Dukes	Sexy Slim Goody	2007-2008
Eric Esch	Butterbean	2009-2010
Sid Eudy ^{†}	Sid Vicious	2007; 2009
Page Falkinburg, Jr.	Diamond Dallas Page	2009
Roy Farris	The Honky Tonk Man	2000; 2013
Solofa Fatu, Jr.	Rikishi	2011; 2013
Justin Felix	Bubba Mackenzie	2006-2010
Kevin Fertig	Kevin Thorn	2011
Michael Foley, Sr.	Mick Foley	2011
Nelson Frazier, Jr.^{†}	Big Daddy V	2009; 2011
Jeremy Fritz	Eric Young	2004; 2005
Terrence Funk ^{†}	Terry Funk	2004–2006; 2009; 2011
Terry Gerin	Rhyno	2004; 2005; 2011-2012
Danny Gimondo	Inferno	1999
Brian Gorie	Feminem	2003
Zach Gowan	Zach Gowen	2007-2008; 2011-2013
Scott Hall^{†}	Scott Hall	2007-2009
Matthew Hardy	Matt Hardy	2012
Chris Harris	Chris Harris	2004; 2005
James Harris^{†}	Kamala	2003; 2007; 2009-2010
Joshua Harter	Chris Sabin	2005
David Heath	Gangrel	2008; 2010
Michael Hegstrand^{†}	Road Warrior Hawk	2003
Jon Heidenreich	Heidenreich	2008-2009
John Hennigan	John Morrison	2012
Dorian Hill	D-Ray 3000	2005
Rudy Hill	Rude Boy	1999-2006; 2009
Ian Hodgkinson	Vampiro	2000-2002; 2006-2007; 2011-2013; 2021-2025
Daniel Hollie	Damaja	2007-2008
Brute Issei	Brute Issei	2007
Brian James	Jesse James	2011
Jeffrey Jarrett	Jeff Jarrett	2003; 2005
Conrad Kennedy III	Conrad "Lights Out" Kennedy	2007-2008
Ron Killings	Ron Killings	2005; 2007
Mike Kinney	Gator Magraw	2007
Michael Kirchner^{†}	Leather Face	2007
Brian Knighton^{†}	Axl Rotten	2007
Michael Kubo	Gavin Starr	1999
Martin Krcaj	Doink the Clown 1 Truth Martini	1999; 2010-2011
Tommy Lapeer	Hollywood Chuck Hogan "Death Dealer" Tommy Starr	1999–2004
Franklin Lashley	Bobby Lashley	2011-2013
Joseph Laurinaitis^{†}	Road Warrior Animal	2003
Jerry Lawler	Jerry "The King" Lawler	2004
Edward Leslie	Brutus "The Barber" Beefcake	2001-2003; 2007; 2011
Scott Levy	Raven	2008-2009; 2011
Matthew Massie	Matt Jackson	2013
Nicholas Massie	Nick Jackson	2013
R.L. Marks	Lane Bloody	2007-2008
Paul Methric	Monoxide Child	1999–2000
Karl Moffat	Jayson Vorheese	2007
Malcolm Monroe Jr.	DBA	2006
Christopher Mordetsky	Chris Mordetsky	2012
Richard Morton	Ricky Morton	1999; 2010–2012; 2024–2025
Josh Movado	Josh Movado	2006-2010
Keiji Mutoh	Great Muta	2003–2007
William Myers^{†}	George "The Animal" Steele	2000
Kevin Nash	Kevin Nash	2008; 2011-2012
Kazunari Nozawa	Nosawa	2003–2007
Matt Osborne^{†}	Doink The Clown	2011
Corey Ottgen	CJ O'Doyle; C.J. Otis	2006–2007
Mitch Page	Fat Fuck Barrel Boy; Mean Mitch Page	1999–2006
Chris Pallies^{†}	King Kong Bundy	1999; 2000
Christopher Parks	Abyss	2004; 2005
John Parsonage	Johnny Devine	2004; 2005
Kenneth Patera	Ken Patera	2011
Patrick Jordan	Psychopatrick	1999; 2003
Josh Piscura	Josh Prohibition	2003
Peter Polaco	Justin Credible	2007
Akira Raijin	Kowabata	2007-2008; 2011
Julio Ramirez	Jose Maximo	2006
Kelvin Ramirez	Joel Maximo	2006
Josh Raymond	Billy Bong; Josh Abercrombie	2007-2009
Jonathan Rechner^{†}	Balls Mahoney	2011
Russ Redmon	Big Flame; Mr. Meaner	1999–2000
James Reiher^{†}	Jimmy Snuka	2011
Dean Roll	Shark Boy	2006
Robert Roode, Jr.	Robert Roode	2004; 2005
Virgil Runnels, Jr.^{†}	Dusty Rhodes	2005
Manuel Santiago	Pondarosa	2006
Victor Santiago	Sweeden House	2006
Charles Scaggs	2 Cold Scorpio	2007-2008; 2011; 2025
Chris Scobille	Jimmy Jacobs	2007; 2009; 2011-2015
Allen Sarven	Al Snow	2011
Ken Shamrock	Ken Shamrock	2009
John Sims	The Hornswagglin' Hillbilly	2000–2004
Norman Smiley	Norman Smiley	2006
Aurelian Smith, Jr.	Jake "The Snake" Roberts	2007
Rashaam Smith	Esham	2000
Merced Solis	Tito Santana	2007; 2011
Jamie Spaniolo	Jamie Madrox	1999–2000
William Spradlin	Chris Hero	2000
Kevin Steen	Kevin Steen	2011
Scott Steiner	Scott Steiner	2006; 2012
Kevin Sullivan	Kevin Sullivan	2006
Terry Szopinski	The Warlord	2006
Sal Thomas	Sal Thomaselli	2007-2008
Roderick Toombs^{†}	Rowdy Roddy Piper	2008; 2011
Robert Van Winkle	Vanilla Ice	2000
Sione Vailahi	The Barbarian	2006
Hossein Vaziri	Iron Sheik	1999
Michael Verdi^{†}	"Holy" Trent Acid	2007–2010
Mike Walden	Cash Flo; Leatherface	1999–2006
Sean Waltman	Sean Waltman; X-Pac	2011; 2012
Leon White^{†}	Vader	2012
Craig Williams	Human Tornado	2007-2008
John Williams	Ian Bloody; Ian Rotten	1999; 2007-2010
Peter Williams III	Petey Williams	2004; 2005
John Wisniski Jr.	Greg "The Hammer" Valentine	2001-2003; 2007; 2011
Martin Wright	The Boogeyman	2013
	Doink the Clown 2 Terek the Great	1999
	Dyson Price	2006
	Hizaya	2000
Randy Templeton	Insidious	1999
Timothy Boyle	Tim Tim	1999–2000
	Jorge Santana	2007
	K-Pusha	2006
	K-Murda	2006
	Marvelous Mitch Ryder	2007
	Tom Dubt	1999–2003

=== Female wrestlers ===
Name:	Ring name(s):	Tenure(s):
Stephanie Bellars	Gorgeous George	2001
Melissa Bellin	Spice	2000
Stephanie Finochio	Trinity	2005
	Angel	1999
	Chick Foley	1999

=== Other on-air talent ===
Name:	Ring name(s):	Role:	Tenure(s):
Jeremy Borash	Jeremy Borash	Manager of TNA wrestlers	2005
Robert Bruce	The Masked Negotiator	Manager of Kamala	2000
Raymond Heenan^{†}	Bobby "The Brain" Heenan		2003
Jade Jolie	Jade Jolie	Backstage Interviewer	2007
Brian Jones	Brian Jones	Backstage Interviewer	2008
Stefan Kudek	Serious Darious Bagfelt	Backstage Interviewer	1999–2003
Dave Prazak	Some Manager Guy	Manager of The Rock 'n' Roll Express	1999
Annie Social	Annie Social the Nun	Manager of Trent Acid and the Young Alter Boys	2007
Jamie Spaniolo	"Luscious" Johnny Stark	Color commentator	1999–2000; 2007
	Don Miller	Ring Announcer	2003
Kevin Gill		Play-by-play commentator	2010-2017
Scott D'Amore		Manager of Team Canada and Jimmy Jacobs	2004-2007

=== Stables and tag teams ===
Team name:	Members:	Tenure(s):
All Money is Legal	K-Pusha and K-Murda	2006
America's Most Wanted	James Storm and Chris Harris	2004
The Bad Breed	Ian Rotten and Axl Rotten^{†}	2007
Basham Brothers	Doug Basham and Damaja	2007-2008
The Bloody Brothers	Ian Bloody and Lane Bloody	2007-2008
The Bumpin' Uglies	Bubba Mackenzie and Josh Movado	2006-2010
The Headshrinkers	Samu and Alofa	2007
Legion of Doom^{†}	Road Warrior Hawk and Road Warrior Animal	2003
The Mushroom Boyz	Pondarosa and Sweeden House	2006
The Original Dream Team	Brutus "The Barber" Beefcake and Greg "The Hammer" Valentine	2001-2003; 2007
Pimp and Gimp Connection	Zach Gowen and Human Tornado	2007–2008
The Powers of Pain	The Barbarian and The Warlord	2006
The Rainbow Coalition	Big Flame, Bob, and Neil	2000
The Rock 'n' Roll Express	Rick Morton and Robert Gibson	1999; 2010
The S.A.T.	Jose Maximo and Joel Maximo	2006
The Serial Killers	Leather Face^{†} and Jayson Vorheese	2007
Team All Japan	Akira Raijin and Brute Issei	2007
Team Canada	Petey Williams, Robert Roode, Eric Young, Johnny Devine, and Scott D'Amore	2004–2005
Tito & Jorge Santana	Tito Santana and Jorge Santana	2007
Twiztid	Jamie Madrox and Monoxide Child	1999–2000

== Company officials ==
=== Executive officers ===
Name	Notes

=== Creative writers ===
Ring name	Notes
Brian Gorie	Writer
Rudy Hill	Head writer
Russ Redmon	Writer

=== Producers and trainers ===
Name	Notes
Angelo Benedetto	Associate producer, JCW Vol. 1, 2, and 3
Pat Tantalo	Producer, JCW Vol. 1, 2, and 3

=== Referees ===
Real name	Ring name	Notes
Rick Davies	Rick Davies	1999
Daniel Engler	Rudy Charles	2005
Brian Gorie	Brian Gorie	1999–2003
R.T. Huck	R.T. Huck	2XXX

=== Other personnel ===
Name	Notes
Paul Tamm	Director, JCW Vol. 1, 2, and 3
