= Basham Brothers =

Professional wrestling tag team

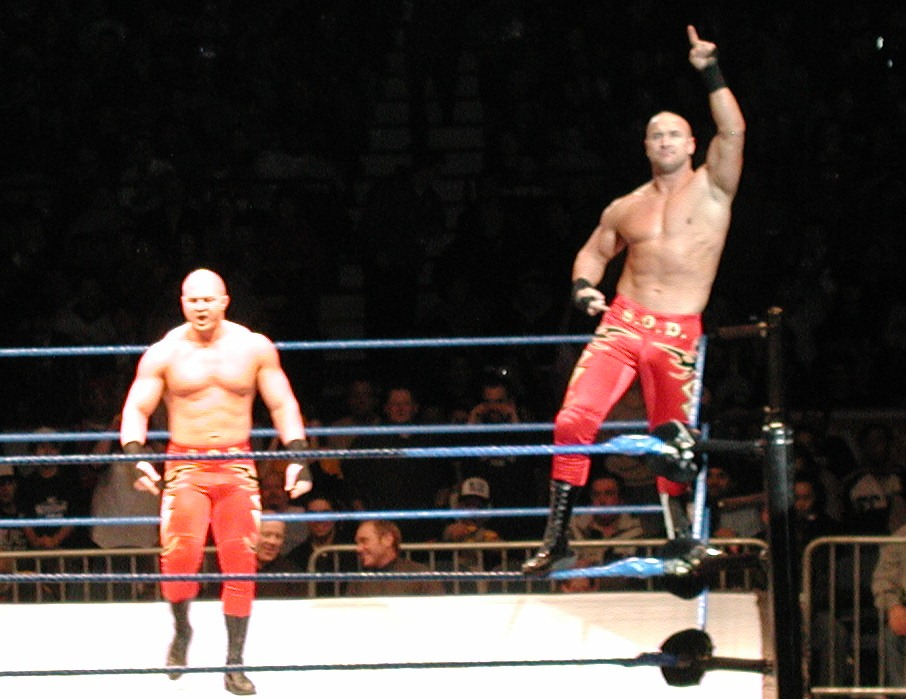
- Danny Basham (left) and Doug Basham (right) in 2005.

Tag team
- Members: Doug Basham; Danny Basham
- Name(s): Basham Brothers; Basham and Damaja; Bashums; Paul Heyman's Personal Enforcers; Revolution; Bashams & Shaniqua
- Billed heights: Doug Basham: 6 ft 2 in (1.88 m); Danny Basham: 6 ft 3 in (1.91 m)
- Combined billed weight: 495 lb (225 kg)
- Billed from: Columbus, Ohio
- Former members: Shaniqua (valet)
- Debut: February 6, 2002
- Disbanded: April 26, 2008
- Years active: 2002–2008

The Basham Brothers were a professional wrestling tag team, composed of Doug Basham and Danny Basham. The team is best known for their tenures in World Wrestling Entertainment (WWE) and Total Nonstop Action Wrestling (TNA).

== History ==
=== Ohio Valley Wrestling (2002–2003) ===
The Basham Brothers initially began working as a team in Ohio Valley Wrestling (OVW), where they were known as Doug Basham and Damaja respectively. On February 6, 2002, they defeated Nick Dinsmore and Rob Conway in an Iron Man match to win the OVW Southern Tag Team Championship. Following a 99-day reign, they lost the championship to Dinsmore and Conway on May 17. In August, they reached the final of the Russ Haas Memorial Cup, but lost to Nova and RC Haas. They spent the remainder of the year and early 2003 feuding with one another, until reuniting in March to take on Bradshaw and Dinsmore.

=== World Wrestling Entertainment (2003-2007) ===
==== Debut (2003–2004) ====
In mid-2003, they were promoted to the main World Wrestling Entertainment (WWE) roster, when Damaja was renamed Danny Basham, and the duo were billed as brothers despite having no actual real life biological relation The Basham Brothers debuted on the May 29 episode of SmackDown!, defeating Spanky and Rikishi. The following week, they unsuccessfully challenged the WWE Tag Team Champions Eddie Guerrero and Tajiri in a non-title match. In June, the Bashams debuted Shaniqua as their valet. While on SmackDown! she proved that she was among the most dominant women on the roster by defeating many of the in-ring divas on the SmackDown! brand outside of Stephanie McMahon and Sable, including Dawn Marie, Nidia, and Torrie Wilson. To further prove this, Shaniqua portrayed a domme while the Bashams took up a BDSM inspired bondage gimmick. In October, they began feuding with The APA (Bradshaw and Ron Simmons), defeating them in three consecutive matches, including at No Mercy.

On the October 23 episode of SmackDown!, The Basham Brothers defeated Los Guerreros (Eddie and Chavo Guerrero) to win the WWE Tag Team Championship. They retained the title in a rematch at Survivor Series, and successfully defended the championship in a four-way match against Los Guerreros, Rikishi and Scotty 2 Hotty, and World's Greatest Tag Team (Charlie Haas and Shelton Benjamin) in December. On the February 5, 2004 episode of SmackDown!, The Bashams lost the title to Rikishi and Scotty 2 Hotty. At No Way Out, the Bashams and Shaniqua lost a handicap match to Rikishi and Scotty 2 Hotty, and Shaniqua was then released from her contract. Over the next several months, The Basham Brothers unsuccessfully challenged for the WWE Tag Team Championship against teams including Rikishi and Scotty 2 Hotty, Dudley Boyz (Bubba Ray and D-Von Dudley), Charlie Haas and Rico, and Billy Kidman and Paul London.

==== The Cabinet (2004–2005) ====
In November 2004, The Basham Brothers joined John "Bradshaw" Layfield's faction, known as The Cabinet, and became known as the Secretaries of Defense. In January 2005, they won a four-way match to win the WWE Tag Team Championship, defeating Rey Mysterio and Rob Van Dam, Eddie Guerrero and Booker T, and Mark Jindrak and Luther Reigns. A month later, at the No Way Out pay-per-view, they lost the titles to Rey Mysterio and Eddie Guerrero, and failed to regain the championship in a rematch on SmackDown! on February 24. In June, they quit The Cabinet.

Danny would wrestle in house shows and dark matches for the Raw brand. Doug went on a singles career going on to appear on WWE Velocity.

==== Paul Heyman's enforcers (2006–2007) ====
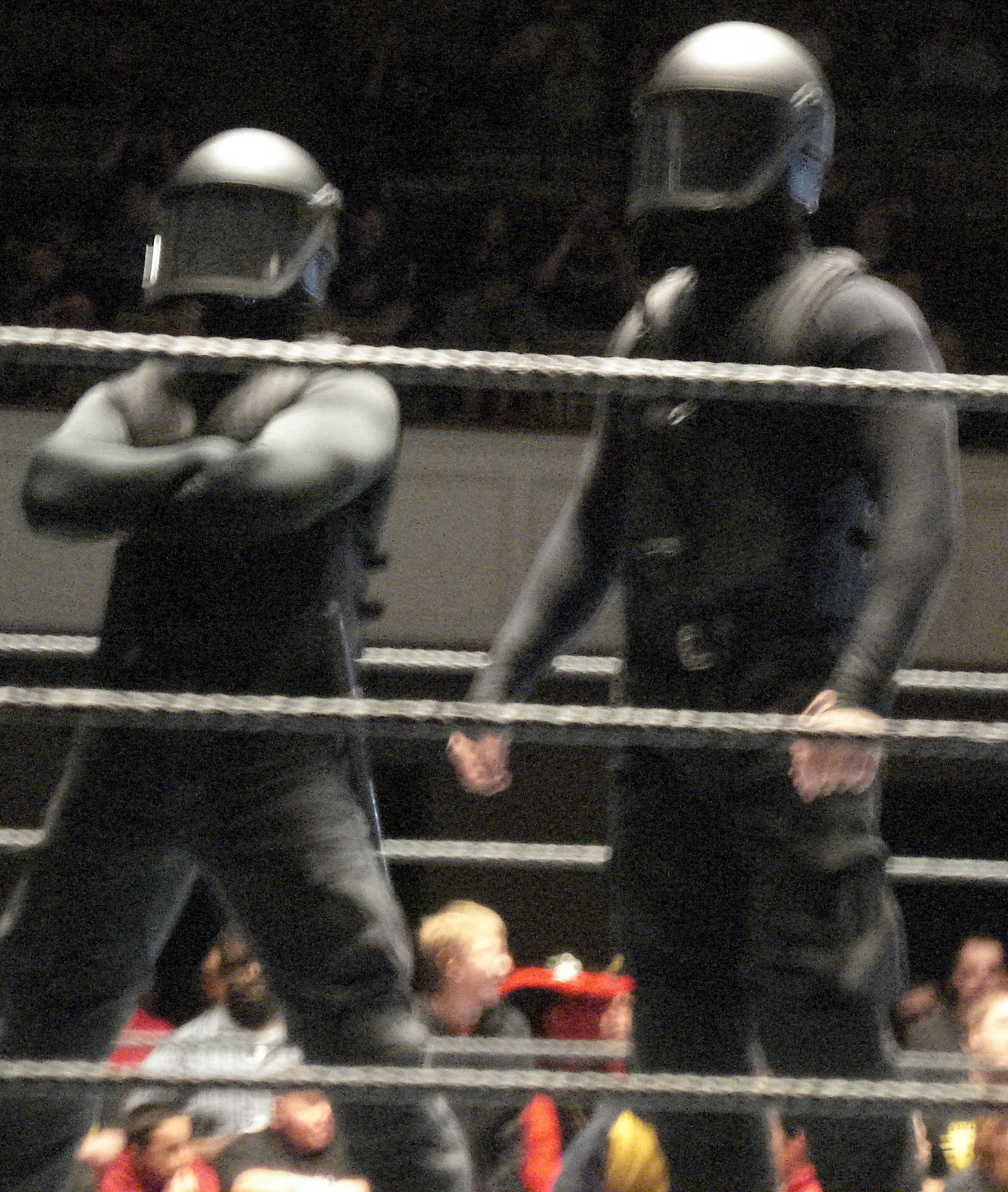
Paul Heyman's Personal Enforcers

The Basham Brothers reunited in ECW brand during July 2006 at several house shows before becoming on-screen unnamed masked "Security Enforcers" for ECW leader Paul Heyman. However, when Danny was injured with a torn biceps, he was later replaced by Derek Neikirk, who continued Danny's role as the second masked enforcer. On January 18, 2007, both were released by WWE.

=== Total Nonstop Action Wrestling (2007) ===
The two debuted in Total Nonstop Action Wrestling on the May 10, 2007, episode of Impact!; known as "Basham" (Doug) and "Damaja" (Danny) attacked the Voodoo Kin Mafia on behalf of Christy Hemme. At Sacrifice, they attacked B.G. James prior to their tag team match, turning it into a handicap match; they went on to defeat Kip James. On May 24, on Impact!, Basham and Damaja defeated Kip James and Lance Hoyt (who was replacing B.G. James). At Slammiversary, Basham and Damaja lost to B.G. and Kip James, but afterward were joined by Hoyt, who turned on the Voodoo Kin Mafia. At Victory Road, Basham and Damaja were defeated by Voodoo Kin Mafia, and they then left the company.

=== IWA Mid-South and Juggalo Championship Wrestling (2007–2008) ===
They would participate in the Chris Candido Cup 2007 tournament in IWA Mid-South defeating Silas Young and Dysfunction on May 25, and Axl Rotten and Mickie Knuckles on May 26 before losing to Thomaselli Brothers in the semi-finals that same night.

That same year they appeared in Juggalo Championship Wrestling losing in an eight-team elimination match for the JCW Tag Team Titles to Necro Butcher and Mad Man Pondo on August 11. Their last match together was on April 26, 2008, as they defeated Adam Rich and Shorty Biggs at JCW Slam TV Tour in Sauget, Illinois.

Later that year Danny retired from professional wrestling. Doug continued to wrestle in England and Ireland until retiring from wrestling in 2009.

== Other media ==
Both of The Bashams appeared in video games WWE Day of Reckoning and WWE SmackDown! vs. Raw 2006.

== Championships and accomplishments ==
- Ohio Valley Wrestling
  - OVW Southern Tag Team Championship (1 time)
- Pro Wrestling Illustrated
  - PWI ranked Danny #65 of the top 500 singles wrestlers in the PWI 500 in 2003
  - PWI ranked Doug #51 of the top 500 singles wrestlers in the PWI 500 in 2003
- World Wrestling Entertainment
  - WWE Tag Team Championship (2 times)
