= 2005 WWE Draft Lottery =

WWE's intra-brand draft

2005 WWE draft lottery
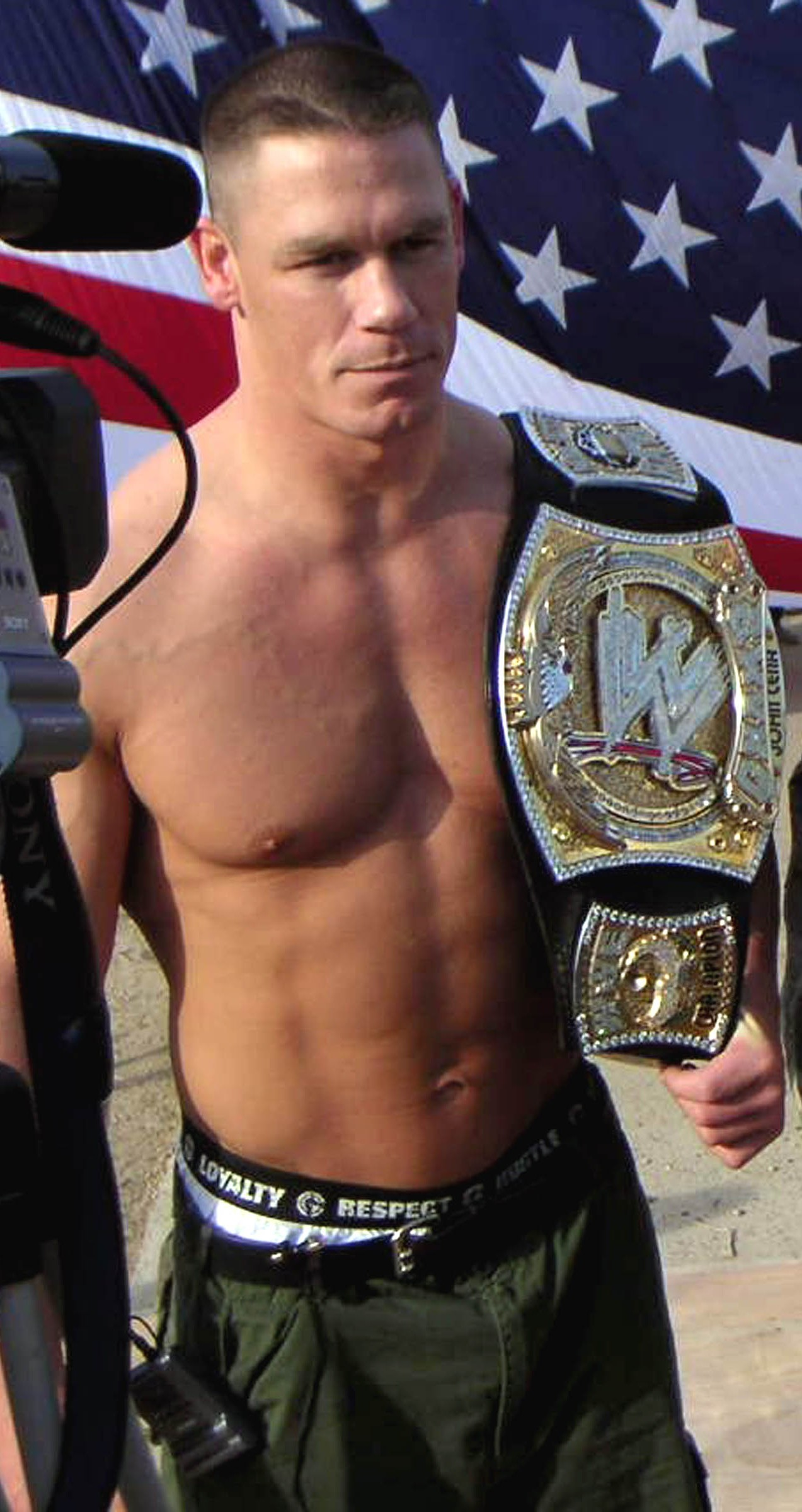
- John Cena, the first draftee in the 2005 WWE draft.

General information
- Sport: Professional wrestling
- Date: June 6–30, 2005

Overview
- League: World Wrestling Entertainment
- Teams: Raw; SmackDown!

The 2005 World Wrestling Entertainment (WWE) draft lottery, the third WWE draft, took place over a four-week period from June 6–30.

Every wrestler from Raw and SmackDown! was eligible to be drafted, including announcers, commentators, and general managers. There were ten draft picks and an eleven-person trade conducted between the promotion's two main brands: Raw and SmackDown!, where twenty-two wrestlers were drafted and traded overall. Draft picks were drawn at (kayfabe) random on WWE's two-hour main television programs, each Monday on Raw (on Spike TV) and each Thursday on SmackDown! (on UPN). Post-draft trades were revealed on WWE's official website, wwe.com.

== Background ==
On the April 18, 2005, episode of Raw, WWE chairman Mr. McMahon scheduled a draft lottery for the following month in May. However, on the May 16 episode of Raw, McMahon postponed the draft to June. He noted that there were no exceptions from the draft, including the injured and the champions.

== Selections ==
=== Draft lottery ===
Pick No.	Brand (to)	Wrestler	Role	Brand (from)	Day of selection
1	Raw	John Cena (then-WWE Champion)	Male wrestler	SmackDown!	June 6 (Raw)
2	SmackDown!	Chris Benoit	Male wrestler	Raw	June 9 (SmackDown!)
3	Raw	Kurt Angle	Male wrestler	SmackDown!	June 13 (Raw)
4	SmackDown!	Randy Orton	Male wrestler	Raw	June 16 (SmackDown!)
5	Raw	Carlito	Male wrestler	SmackDown!	June 20 (Raw)
6	SmackDown!	Muhammad Hassan and Khosrow Daivari	Male wrestlers	Raw	June 23 (SmackDown!)
7	Raw	Big Show	Male wrestler	SmackDown!	June 27 (Raw)
8	Raw	Rob Van Dam	Male wrestler	SmackDown!	June 27 (Raw)
9	SmackDown!	Christian	Male wrestler	Raw	June 30 (SmackDown!)
10	SmackDown!	Batista (then-World Heavyweight Champion)	Male wrestler	Raw	June 30 (SmackDown!)

=== Post-draft trades ===
Pick No.	Brand (to)	Wrestler	Role	Brand (from)
1	Raw	Mark Jindrak^{1}; René Duprée; Danny Basham; Kenzo Suzuki^{2}; Hiroko^{2}; Chavo Guerrero^{3}	Male/female wrestlers	SmackDown!
1	SmackDown!	William Regal; Candice Michelle; Sylvain Grenier; Simon Dean; Stevie Richards	Male/female wrestlers	Raw

- 1 – Jindrak made only one appearance on Raw.
- 2 – These people were released from their contracts prior to their debut on Raw.
- 3 – Guerrero made his return on the July 4 edition of Raw repackaged as Kerwin White. The gimmick was later abandoned in November 2005 after the death of Eddie Guerrero.

== Aftermath ==
This was the first draft in which champions brought their titles to their new show if they were selected. After John Cena was drafted to Raw, along with the WWE Championship, SmackDown! was left without a world title for the remainder of the month of June. As a result, on the June 23, 2005 episode, General Manager, Theodore Long, announced the creation of new world title, called the SmackDown! Championship. The new champion would have been determined in a six-man elimination match between The Undertaker, Muhammad Hassan, Christian, Booker T, John "Bradshaw" Layfield (JBL) and Chris Benoit, which JBL won on the June 30, 2005 episode of SmackDown!. After JBL won the match, Long declared that the SmackDown! Championship was not needed because the then-World Heavyweight Champion, Batista, had been drafted to SmackDown!.

== See also ==
- List of WWE personnel
