= Doug Basham =

American professional wrestler (born 1971)

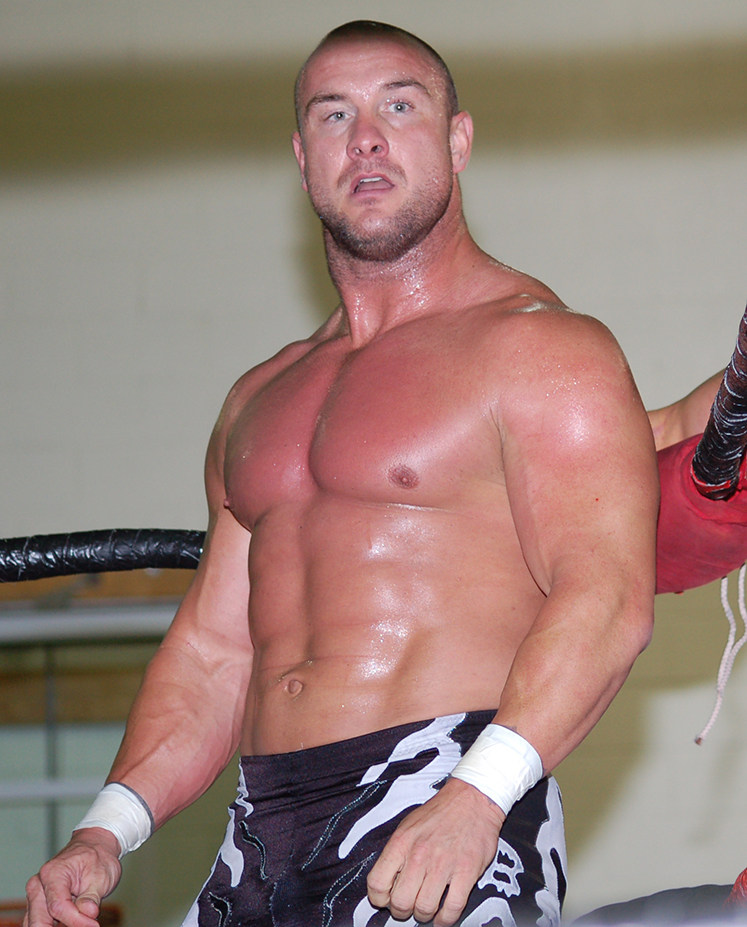
- Basham in 2007

Personal information
- Born: Lyle Douglas Basham Jr. May 12, 1971 (age 55) Louisville, Kentucky, U.S.

Professional wrestling career
- Ring name(s): Basham; Doug Basham; The Machine; Paul Heyman's Personal Enforcer
- Billed height: 6 ft 2 in (1.88 m)
- Billed weight: 245 lb (111 kg)
- Billed from: Columbus, Ohio
- Trained by: Danny Davis
- Debut: 1993
- Retired: 2009 (first retirement); May 1, 2025 (second retirement)

Lyle Douglas Basham Jr. (born May 12, 1971) is an American retired professional wrestler. He is best known for his tenures in World Wrestling Entertainment (WWE) between 2002 and 2007, and in Total Nonstop Action Wrestling under the ring name Basham in 2007.

== Professional wrestling career ==
=== Early career (1993–1996) ===
Basham made his debut in 1993, wrestling in Indiana and for independent promotions in Kentucky. In 1994, he wrestled for the United States Wrestling Association located in Tennessee. He stayed there until 1996.

=== Ohio Valley Wrestling (1996–2003, 2005, 2007) ===
Before being called up to WWE's main roster, Basham competed in its developmental territory, Ohio Valley Wrestling. Basham is the nephew of OVW founder Nightmare Danny Davis. Basham was a top fan favorite in the company, winning the OVW Heavyweight Championship on several occasions.

Basham turned villainous and was involved in a unique storyline that saw him compete under a mask as Machine (A character inspired by the film 8mm). The story was that Basham and his real-life uncle and trainer, Danny Davis, had a falling out, which led to Basham quitting the wrestling business. However, as his uncle's other OVW-trained superstars like Nick Dinsmore, Rob Conway and Damaja began getting opportunities to wrestle on WWE television and become contracted talents, Basham grew resentful and resurfaced as the masked Machine to spoil the opportunities for the other men Davis had trained. Dinsmore would defeat The Machine in a Retirement versus Mask match at the Last Dance on June 27, 2001, and unmask Machine as Doug Basham.

Basham went on to create the Revolution faction and feuded with OVW's top stars. Basham signed a WWE development contract in April 2002 and was soon signed to SmackDown! in May 2003. In OVW, Doug took credit for "The Basham Brothers" gimmick to get back at Danny, a.k.a. Damaja. The two took part in an epic final encounter that saw Revolution members (including Johnny Spade, Mark Magnus, and Rob Conway) handcuffed to Damaja's allies (including Nick Dinsmore and Johnny Jeter) with Matt Morgan on the entrance ramp to prevent any more run-ins. Damaja was victorious, which led to Doug being forced out of OVW. After the match, Doug disbanded Revolution, causing the members to attack him, and Damaja ran back into the ring armed with a Louisville Slugger to make the save. Doug then embraced former partner Damaja and his uncle, OVW owner Danny Davis, before going to the back and shaking hands with the OVW fans, thus making him a face.

After disappearing from WWE TV in September 2005, Doug returned to OVW under a new gimmick: "The Superstar of Superstars." He came out to the ring using the Superman theme before signing a new deal with WWE in April 2006.

On March 7, 2007, The Basham Brothers returned to OVW and defeated Wyatt Young and Mike Tolar in a dark match.

=== World Wrestling Entertainment (2002–2007) ===
With WWE impressed by his in-ring ability, Doug received numerous try-out matches in late 2002 and early 2003 against opponents such as Mark Jindrak, Charlie Haas, Lenny Lane, Val Venis, Nathan Jones, Redd Dogg, Nova, Johnny Jeter, Horshu, Shannon Moore, and Billy Kidman. He also teamed with the likes of Damaja, Sean O'Haire, and Bull Buchanan.

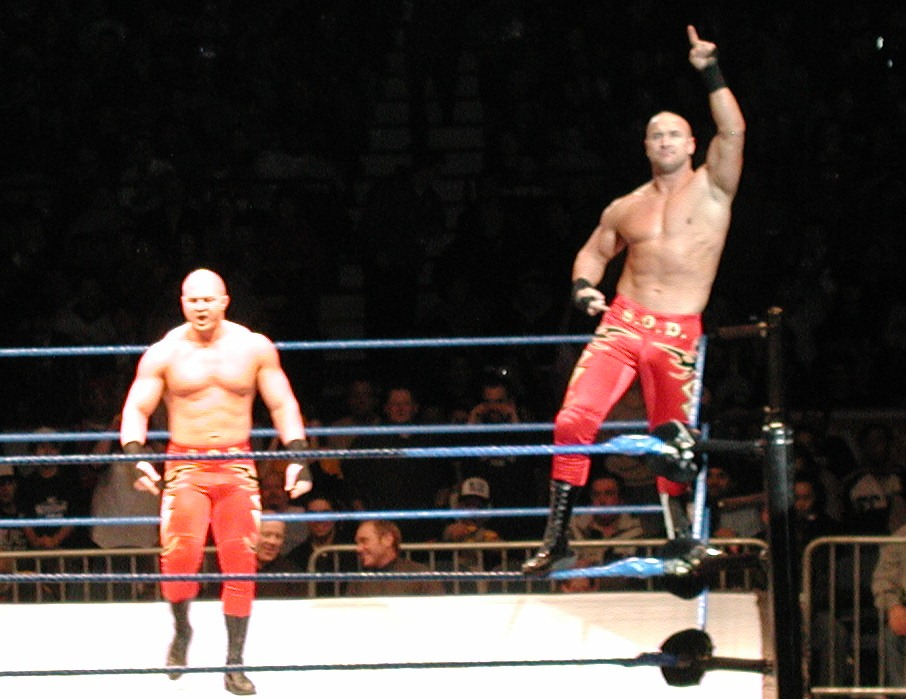
The Basham Brothers in 2005

Basham made his official debut on the May 29, 2003, episode of SmackDown! as one-half of the tag team, The Basham Brothers with his tag partner Danny Basham. The Basham Brothers debuted as a team on May 29 and defeated the team of Rikishi and Brian Kendrick. The Basham Brothers were later joined by Shaniqua. They were given a bondage-based S&M gimmick and won their first WWE Tag Team Championship from Los Guerreros on the October 23 edition of SmackDown!. The team would lose the titles on the February 5, 2004, episode of SmackDown! to Rikishi and Scotty 2 Hotty. On February 15 at No Way Out, The Basham Brothers and Shaniqua faced Scotty 2 Hotty and Rikishi in a handicap match and lost when Rikishi pinned Shaniqua. The Basham Brothers would lose their manager Shaniqua when she was sent to OVW for training not long after No Way Out. For the next few months, the Basham Brothers were regulars on Velocity and appeared on a few occasions on SmackDown! and were generally losing.

The Bashams were given a one-off television appearance on SmackDown! as part of the Tough Enough IV qualifiers. The remaining contestants received 30 seconds each to retrieve a flag from the far corner of the ring. Anyone who succeeded within the time limit would be immune from elimination until the next round. However, the Bashams were the obstacles to prevent the challengers from reaching the flag. The Bashams managed to resist all seven finalists consecutively. They also teased hot favorite Daniel Puder by letting him get within 1 inch of the flag in the final seconds of his turn. (Puder had become the hot favorite one week earlier when he almost defeated a fresh Kurt Angle in an actual wrestling match in seconds immediately after 3 hours of circuit training specifically designed to wear the contestants out.) Impressed by their performance, the tag team was given a push. The Basham Brothers would go on to join John "Bradshaw" Layfield (JBL)'s Cabinet faction on November 25 and became known as JBL's Co-Secretaries of Defense. Their role was often to sacrifice themselves to prevent JBL from getting harmed after he had provoked an opponent. The Bashams would once again win the WWE Tag Team Championship, defeating the teams of Rey Mysterio and Rob Van Dam, Luther Reigns and Mark Jindrak, and Eddie Guerrero and Booker T in a four-way elimination match in January 2005. The Basham Brothers lost the titles to Rey Mysterio and Eddie Guerrero at No Way Out on February 20. The Bashams would then win sporadically on SmackDown! or defeat any teams they faced on Velocity. The Basham Brothers quit JBL's Cabinet on the June 16, 2005, episode of SmackDown!, claiming that they were tired of being "JBL's crash test dummies" and not getting enough respect.

On June 30, Danny became one of the last-minute trades in the 2005 WWE Draft Lottery, which saw him jump from SmackDown! over to Raw. This left both men in singles competition in WWE on different brands. Basham would return to television on the August 27 edition of Velocity under the "Bash Man" gimmick. The Bash Man came out to the ring wearing sunglasses, a shiny leather vest, and shiny wool pants. Basham continued to work squash matches under this unexplained gimmick sporadically over several months.

While disappearing off WWE television, Basham would return to OVW for several stints before signing a new deal with WWE in April 2006. Both Basham and Danny would reunite in WWE's revived ECW brand during July 2006 at several house shows before becoming on-screen unnamed masked "Security Enforcers" for ECW leader Paul Heyman. When Danny was injured with a torn biceps, he was replaced by Derek Neikirk, who continued Danny's role as the second masked enforcer.

The Security Team's existence was left into question after Heyman was removed from WWE television. The team stayed to compete in one handicap match against Bobby Lashley before disappearing from TV themselves.

On January 19, 2007, Basham was released by WWE along with several other wrestlers.

=== Total Nonstop Action Wrestling (2007) ===
Doug Basham, or simply Basham and Danny Basham (now known as Damaja), debuted in Total Nonstop Action Wrestling on the May 10 episode of TNA Impact!. They were subsequently revealed to be allies of the villainous Christy Hemme, and at Sacrifice, Basham and Damaja defeated Hemme's rivals Kip James and Lance Hoyt in a tag team match. On August 15, Basham along with Damaja left TNA wrestling.

=== Europe, Return to OVW, and retirement (2008–2009) ===
In April 2008, the Bashams wrestled as a team one last time on a weekend tournament for Juggalo Championship Wrestling's Slam TV Tour.

In June 2008, Basham went to Ireland to work for Irish Whip Wrestling. Later that year, he went to England to work for various promotions. Basham returned to OVW for a one-night appearance on October 10, 2008, and defeated JD Michaels with Al Barone by disqualification due to Barone getting involved. He left Europe in March 2009. He returned to North America for his last match on September 5, 2009, for Pro Wrestling Fusion, defeating Francisco Ciatso in Temple Terrance, Florida.

In the fall of 2020, Doug Basham became the Advanced Wrestling Instructor for the Al Snow Wrestling Academy in Louisville, KY.

=== Return to wrestling and second retirement (2022–2023) ===
Basham came out of retirement on August 27, 2022, teaming with Al Snow as they defeated Adam Revolver and Joe Mack at OVW's The Big One pay-per-view. He retired once again on December 3, 2023.

== Other media ==
Basham appeared in WWE Day of Reckoning and WWE SmackDown! vs. Raw 2006.

== Championships and accomplishments ==
- International Pro Wrestling: United Kingdom/Revolution Pro Wrestling
  - IPW:UK Tag Team Championship (1 time) – with Iestyn Rees, Joel Redman, Mark Haskins and Ricky Hype
- Ohio Valley Wrestling
  - OVW National Heavyweight Championship (1 time)
  - OVW Heavyweight Championship (4 times)
  - OVW Southern Tag Team Championship (2 times) – with Flash Flanagan (1) and Damaja (1)
- Pro Wrestling Illustrated
  - PWI ranked him #51 of the top 500 singles wrestlers in the PWI 500 in 2003
- World Wrestling Entertainment
  - WWE Tag Team Championship (2 times) – with Danny Basham
