= Daniel Hollie =

American professional wrestler (born 1977)

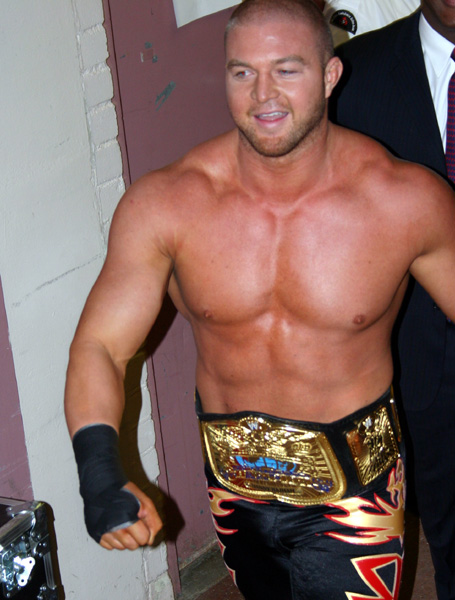
- Hollie as WWE Tag Team Champion in 2005

Personal information
- Born: Daniel Richard Hollie; October 3, 1977 (age 48) Seymour, Indiana, U.S.

Professional wrestling career
- Ring name(s): The Damaja; Danny Basham; Danny Holliday
- Billed height: 6 ft 3 in (191 cm)
- Billed weight: 250 lb (113 kg)
- Billed from: Columbus, Ohio
- Trained by: Jim Cornette; Nightmare Danny Davis
- Debut: 1999
- Retired: 2008

Daniel Richard Hollie (born October 3, 1977) is an American retired professional wrestler. He is best known for his tenures in World Wrestling Entertainment (WWE) between 2003 and 2007 under the ring name Danny Basham and in Total Nonstop Action Wrestling under the ring name Damaja in 2007.

== Professional wrestling career ==
=== Ohio Valley Wrestling (1999–2003) ===
Hollie made his wrestling debut in Ohio Valley Wrestling (OVW), as the Damaja. On January 6, 1999, he and David C. were awarded the OVW Tag Title when Nick Dinsmore no-showed and Rob Conway was counted out. He was also a three-time OVW Champion, defeating the likes of Dinsmore, Flash Flanagan, and Nova.

In 2000 Danny Hollie made a few appearances on WWF Jakked and in dark matches under the ring name Danny Holliday. In 2003, he was given the managerial services of Tough Enough II winner Shaniqua.

=== World Wrestling Entertainment (2002–2007) ===
In late 2002 through early 2003 Hollie worked dark matches before the Raw and SmackDown tapings under his OVW gimmick and ring name, The Damaja. On May 29, 2003, Danny made his WWE television debut (as Danny Basham), teaming with Doug Basham to form the heel tag team, the Basham Brothers. The Bashams were later aligned with the valet, Shaniqua. As well as being portrayed with a bondage-based S&M gimmick, the "brothers" often switched places mid-match, so the "fresher" wrestler was always in the ring. In almost all cases, the referee acted oblivious to the switch, despite their easily differentiated faces and they won their first WWE Tag Team Championship from Los Guerreros on the October 23 episode of SmackDown!, after they switched places behind the referee's back, and hit Eddie Guerrero with a foreign object. The team lost the titles in February 2004 to Rikishi and Scotty 2 Hotty. The Basham Brothers and Shaniqua faced Scotty 2 Hotty and Rikishi at No Way Out in a handicapped match for the tag team titles but lost when Shaniqua was pinned. Right after this match, Shaniqua was sent to OVW for training and was eventually released.

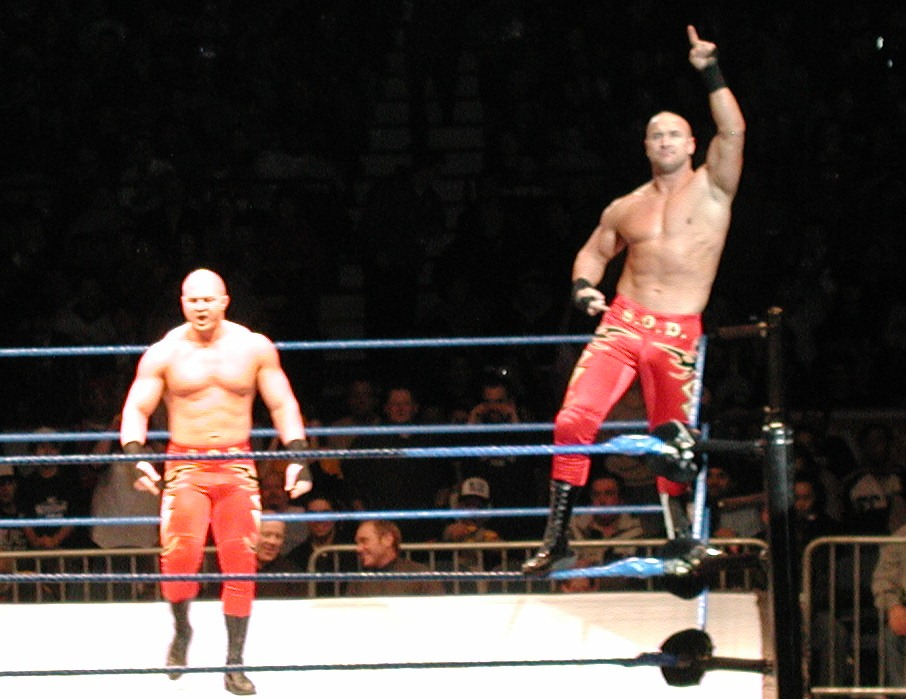
The Basham Brothers in 2005

The Basham Brothers joined John "Bradshaw" Layfield (JBL)'s cabinet stable on November 25, 2004. They were known as JBL's Co-Secretaries of Defense. The Bashams once again won the WWE Tag Team Championship by defeating four other teams including Rey Mysterio and Rob Van Dam, Luther Reigns and Mark Jindrak, and Eddie Guerrero and Booker T on January 13, 2005, in a four team elimination match by last eliminating Mysterio and Van Dam. The Basham Brothers lost the titles to Rey Mysterio and Eddie Guerrero at No Way Out on February 20, 2005. From here on, The Bashams either acted as jobbers on SmackDown! or defeated any team that came in their path on Velocity. The Basham Brothers quit JBL's Cabinet on the June 16 episode of SmackDown!, claiming that they were tired of being "JBL's crash test dummies" and not getting enough respect.

On June 30, 2005, Basham became one of the last-minute trades in the 2005 WWE Draft, which saw him leave SmackDown! for Raw. This marked the end of the partnership with his "twin brother," who remained on SmackDown!. On the July 18 episode of Raw, Basham made his first appearance on the Raw brand as one of Chris Jericho's hand picked lumberjacks in the Lumberjack match between John Cena and Gene Snitsky.

In August 2005, Hollie worked dark matches during Raw tapings under his former gimmick, The Damaja and made his televised debut on the September 11 episode of WWE Heat (as Danny Basham) under his Damaja gimmick, only more gothic and Raven-like. Danny came out with new music, black face paint, and ring attire consisting of black boots and baggy black pants with hooks and chains on them. Hollie soon disappeared from television to grow his hair but continued to work squash matches under this gimmick very sporadically at house shows or in dark matches over the next several months before completely disappearing from in-ring competition in 2006 before signing a new deal with WWE in April of that year.

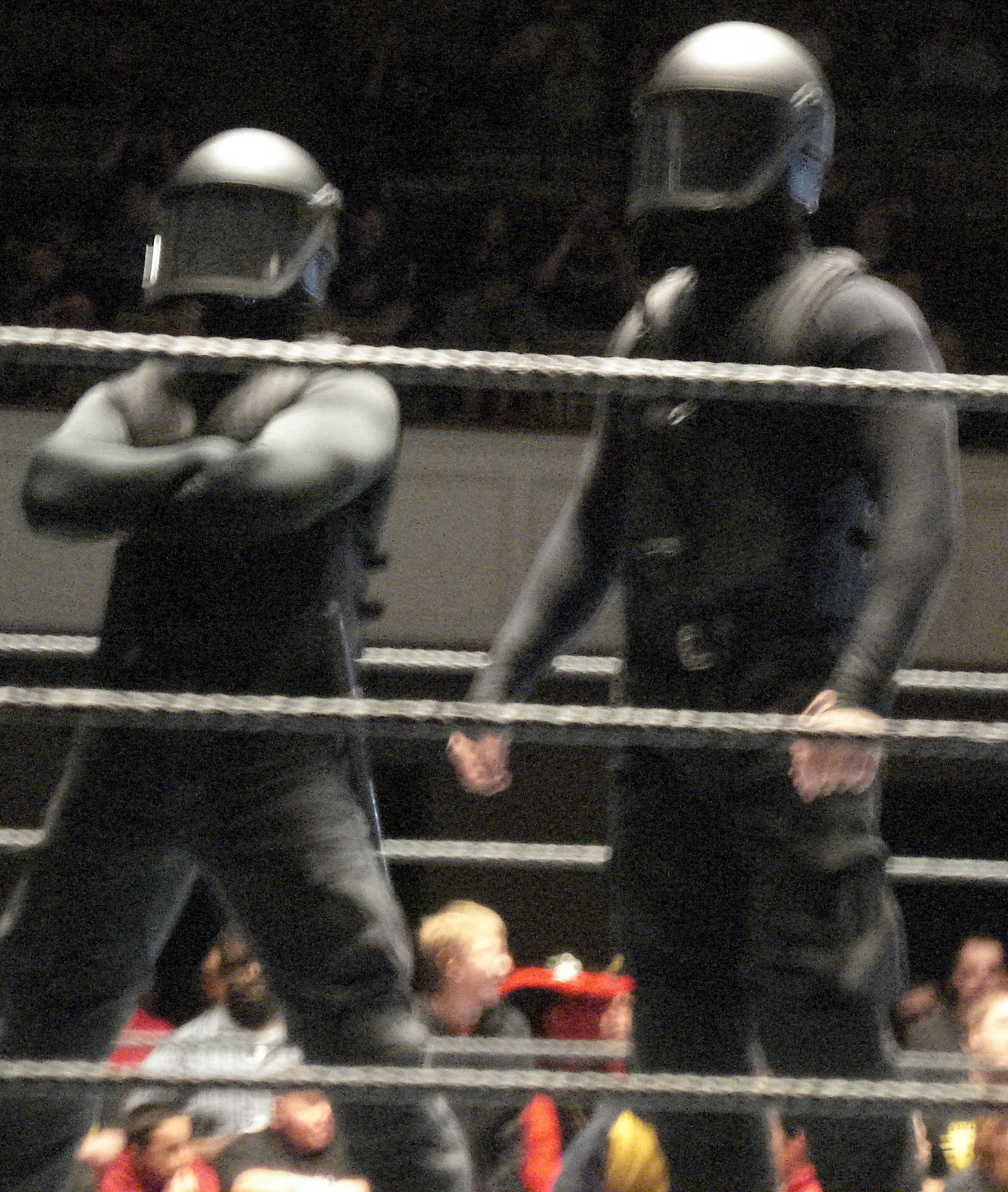
The Bashams in 2006, as Paul Heyman's personal security

Danny and Doug reunited in WWE's revived ECW brand during July 2006 at several house shows. They re-debuted on television on the July 18 episode of ECW, as personal security guards under helmets. However, when Danny was injured with a torn biceps, he was later replaced by Derek Neikirk, who continued Danny's role as the second masked enforcer. Danny's final WWE appearance was on the December 12 episode of ECW, where he and Doug were quickly defeated by Bobby Lashley. Hollie was released by WWE on January 18, 2007.

=== Return to Ohio Valley Wrestling (2006-2007) ===
On November 18, 2006, Hollie made a surprising return when OVW owner Danny Davis introduced Danny Basham as the "OVW TroubleShooter" (similar to a General Manager), granting him the power to direct each OVW show. On March 7, 2007, The Basham Brothers returned to OVW and defeated Wyatt Young and Mike Tolar in a dark match.

=== Total Nonstop Action Wrestling (2007) ===
On April 20, 2007, Damaja and Doug Basham took on Rhino in a Derby City Street Fight, which Doug Basham lost. Basham and Damaja both appeared alongside Christy Hemme at the April 30 TNA Impact! TV Tapings. They were then revealed on the May 10 Impact! to be the mystery team facing the Voodoo Kin Mafia at Sacrifice in a match which they won.

=== Later career (2007–2008) ===
They would participated in the Chris Candido Cup 2007 tournament in IWA Mid-South defeating Silas Young and Dysfunction on May 25, and Axl Rotten and Mickie Knuckles on May 26 before losing to the Thomaselli Brothers in the semi-finals that same night.

That same year they appeared in Juggalo Championship Wrestling losing in an eight team elimination match for the JCW Tag Team Championships to Necro Butcher and Mad Man Pondo on August 11, 2007. Their last match together was on April 26, 2008, as they defeated Adam Rich and Shorty Biggs at JCW Slam TV Tour in Sauget, Illinois.

He wrestled his last match for Insanity Pro Wrestling, unsuccessfully challenging Joey Owens for the IPW Mid-American Championship on July 5, 2008.

== Other media ==
He appeared in video games WWE Day of Reckoning and WWE SmackDown! vs. Raw 2006 as Danny Basham alongside his then in-ring tag team partner Doug Basham.

== Championships and accomplishments ==
- Ohio Valley Wrestling
  - OVW Heavyweight Championship (4 times)
  - OVW Southern Tag Team Championship (3 times) – with David C (2) and with Doug Basham (1)
- Pro Wrestling Illustrated
  - PWI ranked him #65 of the top 500 singles wrestlers in the PWI 500 in 2003
- World Wrestling Entertainment
  - WWE Tag Team Championship (2 times) – with Doug Basham
