= Linda Miles =

American professional wrestler (born 1978)

Personal information
- Born: August 28, 1978 (age 48) Cincinnati, Ohio, U.S.
- Education: Rutgers University
- Children: 1

Professional wrestling career
- Ring name(s): Linda Miles; Shaniqua
- Billed height: 6 ft (183 cm)
- Billed weight: 154 lb (70 kg)
- Billed from: Cincinnati, Ohio, U.S.
- Trained by: Ohio Valley Wrestling
- Debut: 2002
- Retired: 2005

Linda Miles (born August 28, 1978) is an American basketball player and retired professional wrestler. She is best known for her time in the World Wrestling Entertainment (WWE) under the ring name, Shaniqua. She won the second season of the MTV reality show WWE Tough Enough alongside Jackie Gayda, receiving a one-year contract with the WWE.

== Basketball career ==
After graduating from Hughes High School in Cincinnati, Miles attended Rutgers University, where she played basketball for the Rutgers Scarlet Knights. She graduated from Rutgers in 2001, trying out for roster spot with the Seattle Storm of the WNBA, but was released during the team's training camp. Miles and her fellow Rutgers teammates were featured in a 2004 documentary titled; This is a Game, Ladies.

After retiring from professional wrestling in 2005, Miles began working as a college basketball referee. In 2015 Miles was inducted in to the Athletic Hall of Fame induction class.

Ratios
Year	Team	GP	FG%	3P%	FT%	RBG	APG	BPG	SPG	PPG
1997-98	Rutgers	32	41.5%	25.0%	87.1%	6.875	1.719	0.219	0.969	8.313
1998-99	Rutgers	35	49.3%	20.0%	76.8%	5.400	1.971	0.200	1.486	9.700
1999-00	Rutgers	34	48.4%	50.0%	71.2%	5.353	1.912	0.206	1.176	6.529
2000-01	Rutgers	29	46.7%	12.5%	62.9%	5.500	2.600	0.100	1.500	5.700
Career		130	46.4%	21.1%	76.2%	5.777	2.038	0.192	1.277	7.638

Totals
Year	Team	GP	FG	FGA	3P	3PA	FT	FTA	REB	A	BK	ST	PTS
1997-98	Rutgers	32	107	258	1	4	54	62	220	55	7	31	266
1998-99	Rutgers	35	138	280	1	5	63	82	189	69	7	52	340
1999-00	Rutgers	34	92	190	1	2	37	52	182	65	7	40	222
2000-01	Rutgers	29	71	152	1	8	22	35	160	76	4	43	165
Career		130	408	880	4	19	176	231	751	265	25	166	993

== Professional wrestling career ==
World Wrestling Entertainment (2002-2004)

In 2002, Miles took part and won the second season of MTV's reality series WWE Tough Enough, alongside Jackie Gayda, winning a one-year developmental contract with the World Wrestling Entertainment.

Miles made her official in-ring debut on the June 8, 2002, episode of WWE Velocity, with Jackie Gayda in her corner, against her former Tough Enough trainer Ivory in a losing effort after Gayda turned heel pushing Miles off the top turnbuckle, costing her the match. On the June 13 episode, of WWE SmackDown Miles teamed with the then WWE Women's Champion, Trish Stratus defeating the team of Ivory and Jackie Gayda. Miles and Gayda were then transferred to the RAW brand. On the June 24 episode, of RAW, Miles once again teamed with Trish Stratus to defeat the team of Jackie Gayda and Molly Holly. In late 2002, Miles became the short lived valet of Shelton Benjamin, the pairing was dropped as Benjamin was moved to Smackdown! forming Team Angle with Charlie Haas and Kurt Angle. Miles was removed from WWE television and sent to WWE's developmental brand Ohio Valley Wrestling for further training. She was featured in the WWE direct to DVD special, WWE Divas: Undressed.

While in Ohio Valley Wrestling, Miles worked predominately as a valet while training to become a wrestler. She sporadically worked in multi-woman matches against women such as; Gail Kim, Jillian Hall, Nikita, Nurse Lulu, Passion and Trendy.

Miles once against returned to WWE television in June 2003, under the ring name Shaniqua, the dominatrix of the Basham Brothers, featuring in multiple backstage segments where Shaniqua would whip the Brothers. She began often interfering in matches, ensuring the Bashams' victories. In the summer of 2003, Shaniqua began feuding with the fellow Smackdown! Divas. On the September 4 episodes, she interfered in the Bourbon Street bikini contest attacking Dawn Marie, Nidia and Torrie Wilson. Dawn Marie challenged Shaniqua to a singles match the following week on Smackdown! which Shaniqua won via disqualification after interference from Nidia and Torrie Wilson, who hit Shaniqua with a steel chair. The following week on Smackdown! Shaniqua defeated both Nidia and Torrie Wilson in a handicap match, after the match Shaniqua attacked Dawn Marie who was watching at ringside. The feud was abruptly dropped and Shaniqua was not used on WWE television again until the October 2 episode, of Smackdown!. On the October 2 episode, of Smackdown! she returned to television and interfered in a match between The A.P.A and the Basham Brothers, helping the Bashams' earn the victory. After the match she was hit with a Clothesline from Hell from Bradshaw, putting her out of action for several weeks. She returned to television again at the 2003 No Mercy pay-per-view attacking Bradshaw with a night stick during his match against the Basham Brothers, upon her return she had new breast implants, which were explained via storyline as permanent swelling as a result of the Clothesline from Hell. Shaniqua spent the next few weeks continuing as the valet for the Basham Brothers, regularly interfering in their matches. The Basham Brothers and Shaniqua began feuding with the then WWE Tag Team Champions, Rikishi and Scotty 2 Hotty. At the 2004 No Way Out pay-per-view Shaniqua teamed with the Basham Brothers in a intergender handicap match against Rikishi and Scotty 2 Hotty, with Shaniqua's team losing after she was pinned following a Banzai Drop from Rikishi. This marked her last televised appearance with the WWE, reportedly due to her having a bad attitude backstage.

Miles was once again sent back to WWE's training facility Ohio Valley Wrestling for further training. During her second run at the developmental facility, she continued to work mostly as a valet, occasionally wrestling in intergender matches. On 21 May 2004, at the OVW Six Flag Summer Sizzler Series, Shaniqua teaming with Passion, lost to the team of Alexis Laree and Jillian Hall, during the match Miles botched a sunset flip pin from Laree and was kept off OVW television as a result. She returned on the 16 June 2004 episode, defeating Jillian Hall, during the match Shaniqua dropped Hall on her head, after the match Shaniqua received backstage heat with multiple talents including the then head of OVW, Jim Cornette. Her final OVW appearance was in an intergender battle royal, on August 13, 2004, which she lost. She was granted her release from the WWE on November 12, 2004.

Toryumon (2005)

After leaving the WWE, Miles wrestled one final match on May 14, 2005, in Mexico City. She wrestled for Japanese wrestling promotion Toryumon a part of its eighth anniversary show, in a one night only appearance. She was defeated by former WWE Diva and WWF Tough Enough season 1 winner, Nidia Guenard.

== Personal life ==
Miles currently works as a basketball referee and has one son.

== Filmography ==
Film and television
Year	Title	Role	Notes
2002	WWE Tough Enough season 2	Self; contestant	1st place, 13 episodes
2002	WWE Divas: Undressed	Linda Miles	Direct to DVD
2002	Blind Date	Self; contestant	1 episode
2004	This is a Game, Ladies	Self; feature	Documentary
2018	WCPO 9	Self; interviewee	1 episode

== Championships and accomplishments ==
- World Wrestling Entertainment
  - Tough Enough II - with Jackie Gayda
