= Nidia Guenard =

American professional wrestler (born 1979)

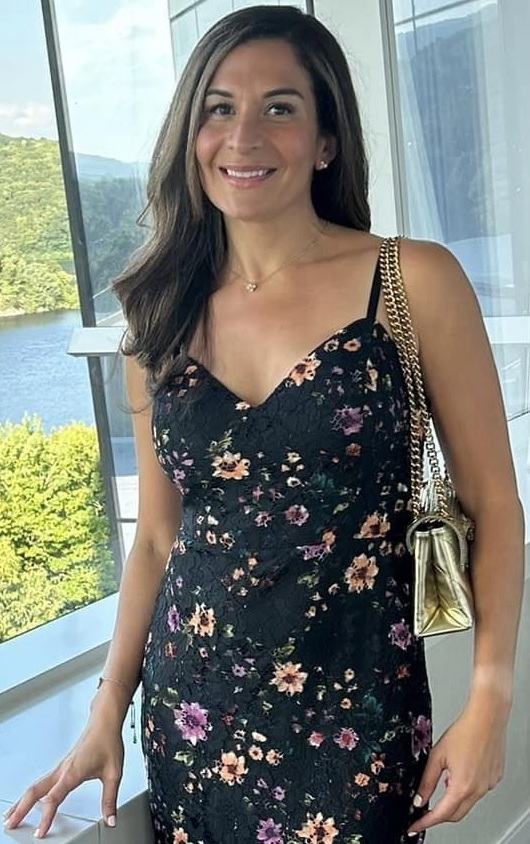
- Nidia in 2023

Personal information
- Born: Nidia Guenard; March 12, 1979 (age 47) Houston, Texas, U.S.
- Spouse: David Krichmar
- Children: 2

Professional wrestling career
- Ring name: Nidia
- Billed height: 5 ft 6 in (1.68 m)
- Billed weight: 125 lb (57 kg)
- Billed from: Puerto Rico
- Trained by: Al Snow; Tazz; Jacqueline Moore; Tori
- Debut: 2001
- Retired: 2005

Nidia Guenard (born March 12, 1979) is an American of Puerto Rican ascendant retired professional wrestler. She is best known for her time with World Wrestling Entertainment (WWE) under her first name, where she is known for co-winning the inaugural season of Tough Enough alongside Maven in 2001. She was with the company until 2004.

== Professional wrestling career ==
=== World Wrestling Federation/Entertainment (2001–2004) ===
==== Tough Enough (2001) ====
Guenard began her professional wrestling career in 2001 upon being selected to participate in the inaugural season of Tough Enough, a reality television show meant both to be a semi-documentary of the difficulties of being a trainee professional wrestler and used by the World Wrestling Federation (WWF) to find new WWF stars. Ultimately, Guenard would become the co-winner of the competition alongside Maven.

==== Ohio Valley Wrestling (2001–2002) ====
Guenard made a few appearances on WWF episodes in 2001 before being sent to the Ohio Valley Wrestling (OVW) promotion, with whom WWE had a talent-development agreement. While in OVW she feuded with Victoria.

==== SmackDown! (2002–2004) ====
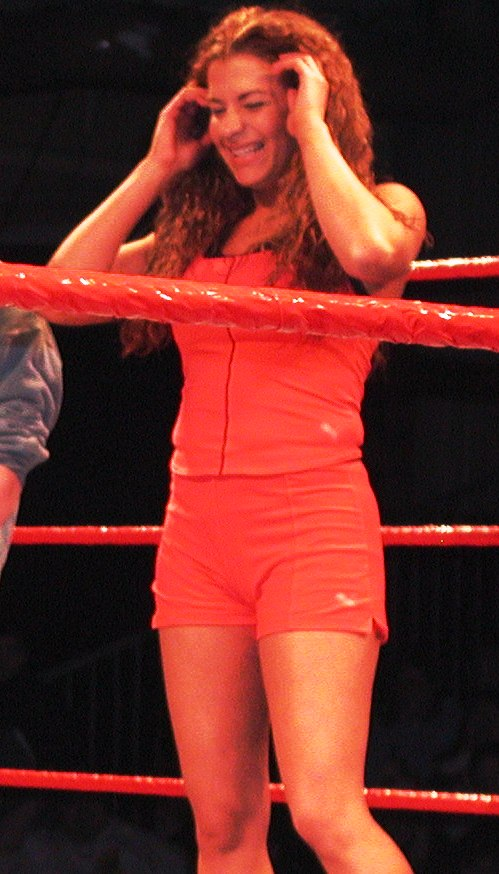
Nidia in 2002

Guenard debuted on the SmackDown! brand on the June 6, 2002 episode, in a backstage segment with The Hurricane (who was her on-screen ex-boyfriend) and Jamie Noble. Noble and Guenard then became an on-screen couple in a "trailer trash" gimmick. They were both playing as heels, with Nidia leading Noble to several wins, due to interference during the matches. At the King of the Ring she led Noble to winning the Cruiserweight Championship from The Hurricane. She then began to feud with SmackDown! Diva Torrie Wilson leading to many solo and mixed tag team matches with Guenard and Noble against Wilson and various other cruiserweights, including Funaki, Billy Kidman, Rey Mysterio, and Brian Kendrick.

On the October 16, 2003 episode of SmackDown! Guenard was blinded by Tajiri during a match between Tajiri and Noble, after which Tajiri spewed his "Black mist" onto her face (this version of the mist was only ever seen in this instance). Storyline-wise, this encounter resulted in a physical 'injury' to Guenard. After recovering, Guenard started appearing at ringside with sunglasses on, to 'sell' the aftereffects of her injuries. During this time, Noble would throw Guenard in front of various opponents at a match's climax, to both save himself and let him later accuse them of "hitting a woman", etc. Later in this storyline, Rey Mysterio revealed to Guenard that Noble was exploiting her in the aforementioned manner, resulting in Guenard turning against Noble and becoming a fan favorite in the process. The two feuded, culminating in a match at No Way Out in which Noble had to wear a blindfold. True to character, Noble cheated to win as he removed his blindfold during the match.

==== Raw (2004) ====
Guenard was drafted to the Raw Brand on March 22, 2004. She became a face and claimed to be excited that she was drafted to Raw, where she can compete for the WWE Women's Championship. She made her debut match on the March 29, 2004 episode of Raw, defeating Molly Holly. She then tag teamed regularly with Stacy Keibler and Victoria against heels Trish Stratus, Gail Kim, Molly Holly and Jazz. With the shift to Raw also came a change in character, as Guenard's Hispanic heritage was played up; to this effect, she was no longer billed as being from the South but instead she was billed as being from Puerto Rico and she no longer spoke English during promos, instead speaking Spanish in a quick and angry fashion. Guenard was released from her WWE contract on November 3, 2004 along with several other performers, in a routine purge of talent.

=== Independent circuit (2004–2005) ===
Guenard worked several wrestling matches post-WWE, including versus Gail Kim for Mexico's Toryumon and for Australia's World Series Wrestling. In addition, she worked for TNA overseas "a few times." In a ClubWWI.com interview, she said they were fun to work for, but she liked her freedom from wrestling, in general. She also wrestled for Northeast Wrestling (NWE), where she feuded with Jackie Gayda.

In 2016, she made a rare appearance at the WWE Hall of Fame ceremony.

== Personal life ==
Guenard and her husband David Krichmar have two children. In February 2010, she began training at the Culinary Institute Lenôtre in Houston, Texas.

== Championships and accomplishments ==
- World Wrestling Federation
  - Tough Enough I - with Maven Huffman
