= List of WWE United States Champions =

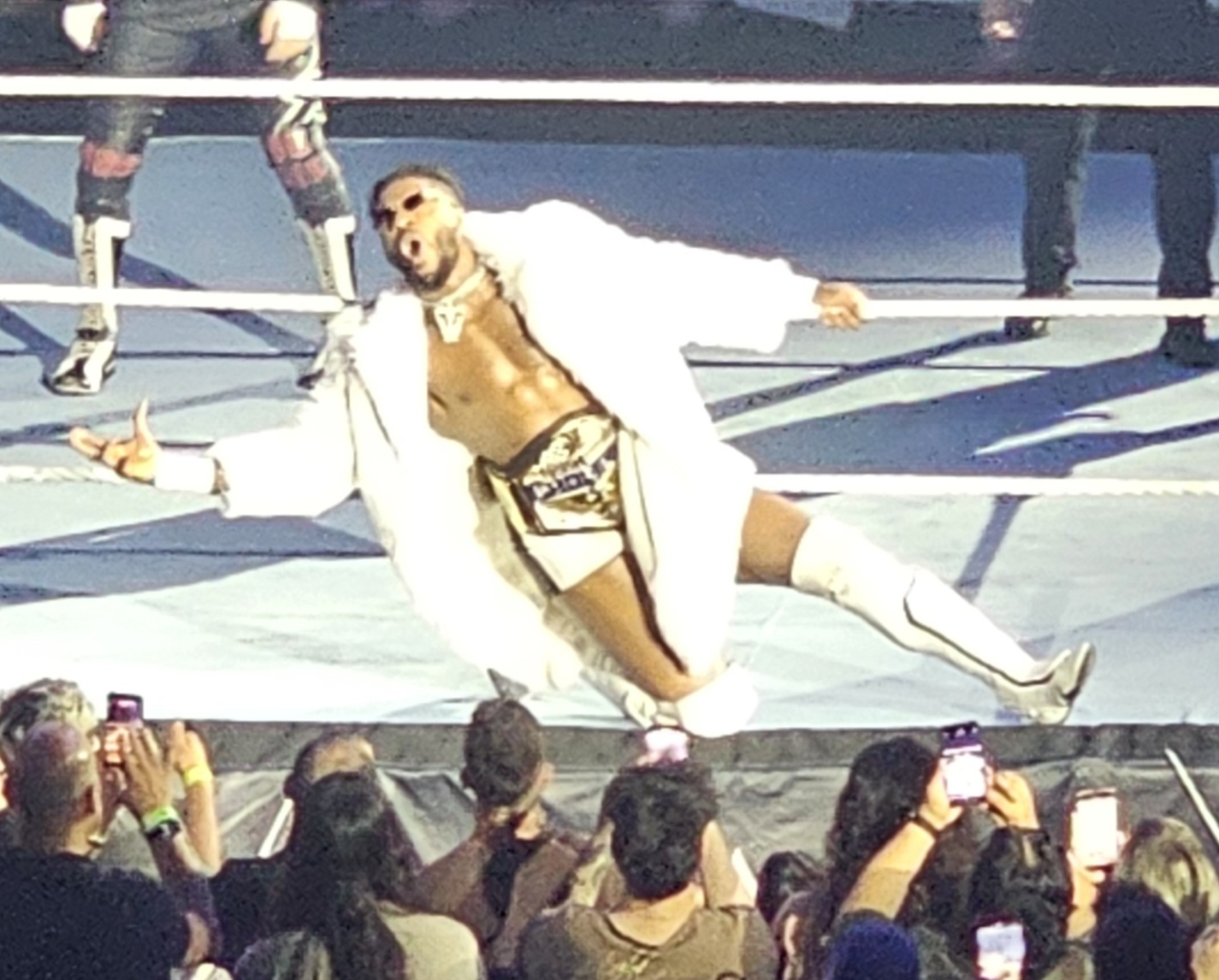
Current and two-time champion Trick Williams

The WWE United States Championship is a professional wrestling championship contested in the American promotion WWE on the SmackDown brand. It was originally known as the NWA United States Heavyweight Championship and began as a regional championship created by and defended in Jim Crockett Jr.'s Mid-Atlantic Championship Wrestling, a territory of the National Wrestling Alliance (NWA). Harley Race became the inaugural champion on the title's introduction on December 31, 1974. Turner Broadcasting bought Mid-Atlantic in November 1988 and renamed it World Championship Wrestling (WCW) after its primary television program.

In March 2001, the then-WWF bought selected assets of WCW. This resulted in the WCW United States Heavyweight Championship becoming a championship for the WWF, which referred to it as the WCW United States Championship. At Survivor Series in November 2001, the WCW United States and WWF Intercontinental Championships were unified, resulting in the United States Championship being deactivated. In July 2003, the title was reactivated as the WWE United States Championship. It is the only active WWE championship not created by the promotion. As of the 2023 WWE Draft, it is exclusive to the SmackDown brand.

The championship is contested in professional wrestling matches, in which participants execute scripted finishes rather than contend in direct competition. Some reigns were held by champions using a ring name, while others used their real name. Trick Williams is the current champion in his second reign. He won the title by defeating Baron Corbin at Sunday Night's Main Event on September 6, 2026, in Atlanta, Georgia.

Overall, there have been 191 reigns among 109 different champions. Ric Flair holds the record for having the most reigns at six, while John Cena holds the record for most reigns under the WWE banner at five. Lex Luger holds the longest reign, with his third reign lasting 523 days, while Dean Ambrose holds the longest reign under the WWE banner at 351 days (overall the third longest in the title's history). "Stunning" Steve Austin's second reign was the shortest, lasting approximately five minutes. Only two men have held the title for a continuous reign of one year (365 days) or more: Lex Luger and Rick Rude. Eddie Guerrero, Bret Hart, Chris Benoit, and Booker T are the only wrestlers to have held the championship in both its WCW and WWE incarnations.

== Title history ==
=== Names ===
Name	Years
NWA United States Heavyweight Championship (Mid-Atlantic version)	December 31, 1974 – January 27, 1981
NWA United States Heavyweight Championship (Undisputed version)	January 27, 1981 – January 1991
WCW United States Heavyweight Championship	January 1991 – March 26, 2001
WCW Canadian Heavyweight Championship (unofficially)	July 18, 2000 – October 29, 2000
WCW United States Championship	June 24, 2001 – November 18, 2001
WWE United States Championship	July 27, 2003 – present

=== Reigns ===
Key
No.	Overall reign number
Reign	Reign number for the specific champion
Days	Number of days held
Days recog.	Number of days held recognized by the promotion
†	Championship change is unrecognized by the promotion
<1	Reign lasted less than a day
+	Current reign is changing daily

No.	Champion	Championship change			Reign statistics			Notes	Ref.
No.	Champion	Date	Event	Location	Reign	Days	Days recog.	Notes	Ref.
National Wrestling Alliance (NWA) / Jim Crockett Promotions (JCP)
1	Harley Race	December 31, 1974	House show	Tallahassee, FL	1	184	183	Defeated Johnny Weaver in a tournament final to become the inaugural NWA United States Heavyweight Champion for Mid-Atlantic Championship Wrestling.	
2	Johnny Valentine	July 3, 1975	House show	Greensboro, NC	1	93	92		
—	Vacated	October 4, 1975	—	—	—	—	—	Vacated when Johnny Valentine suffered a career-ending injury in a plane crash.	
3	Terry Funk	November 9, 1975	House show	Greensboro, NC	1	18	18	Defeated Paul Jones in a tournament final for the vacant title.	
4	Paul Jones	November 27, 1975	House show	Greensboro, NC	1	107	106		
5	Blackjack Mulligan	March 13, 1976	House show	Greensboro, NC	1	217	217		
6	Paul Jones	October 16, 1976	House show	Greensboro, NC	2	43	42	WWE recognizes Jones' reign as ending on November 28, 1976.	
†	Blackjack Mulligan	November 28, 1976	House show	Charlotte, NC	2	11	—		
†	Paul Jones	December 9, 1976	House show	Winston-Salem, NC	3	6	—		
7	Blackjack Mulligan	December 15, 1976	House show	Raleigh, NC	2^{(3)}	204	204		
8	Bobo Brazil	July 7, 1977	House show	Norfolk, VA	1	22	21		
9	Ric Flair	July 29, 1977	House show	Richmond, VA	1	84	83		
10	Ricky Steamboat	October 21, 1977	House show	Charleston, SC	1	72	72		
11	Blackjack Mulligan	January 1, 1978	House show	Greensboro, NC	3^{(4)}	77	77		
12	Mr. Wrestling	March 19, 1978	House show	Greensboro, NC	1	21	21		
13	Ric Flair	April 9, 1978	House show	Charlotte, NC	2	253	251		
14	Ricky Steamboat	December 17, 1978	House show	Toronto, ON, Canada	2	105	104		
15	Ric Flair	April 1, 1979	House show	Greensboro, NC	3	133	133		
—	Vacated	August 12, 1979	—	—	—	—	—	Vacated when Ric Flair won the NWA World Tag Team Championship four days prior.	
16	Jimmy Snuka	September 1, 1979	House show	Charlotte, NC	1	231	232	Defeated Ricky Steamboat in a tournament final for the vacant title. WWE recognizes Snuka's reign as ending on April 20, 1980.	
17	Ric Flair	April 19, 1980	House show	Greensboro, NC	4	98	97	WWE recognizes Flair's reign as beginning on April 20, 1980, although in reality he won the title on April 19, 1980.	
†	Greg Valentine	July 26, 1980	House show	Charlotte, NC	1	121	—		
†	Ric Flair	November 24, 1980	House show	Greenville, SC	5	64	—	Although this reign is not recognized, a WWE.com article recognized Flair as a six-time champion.	
18	Roddy Piper	January 27, 1981	House show	Raleigh, NC	1	193	193	The title became the undisputed NWA United States Heavyweight Championship in January 1981 after the NWA San Francisco office, the last other promotion to recognize its own United States Heavyweight Champion, closed.	
19	Wahoo McDaniel	August 8, 1981	House show	Greensboro, NC	1	31	31		
—	Vacated	September 8, 1981	—	—	—	—	—	Vacated when Wahoo McDaniel was injured by Abdullah the Butcher.	
20	Sgt. Slaughter	October 4, 1981	House show	Charlotte, NC	1	229	228	Defeated Ricky Steamboat in a tournament final for the vacant title.	
21	Wahoo McDaniel	May 21, 1982	House show	Richmond, VA	2	17	17		
22	Sgt. Slaughter	June 7, 1982	House show	Greenville, SC	2	76	75	Awarded the title due to Wahoo McDaniel being injured by Don Muraco and Roddy Piper before the match.	
23	Wahoo McDaniel	August 22, 1982	House show	Charlotte, NC	3	74	74		
24	Greg Valentine	November 4, 1982	House show	Norfolk, VA	1^{(2)}	163	162		
25	Roddy Piper	April 16, 1983	House show	Greensboro, NC	2	14	14		
26	Greg Valentine	May 1, 1983	House show	Greensboro, NC	2^{(3)}	228	228	Valentine won when Roddy Piper suffered a large cut over his left ear and the referee stopped the match.	
27	Dick Slater	December 14, 1983	House show	Shelby, NC	1	129	129		
28	Ricky Steamboat	April 21, 1984	House show	Greensboro, NC	3	64	63		
29	Wahoo McDaniel	June 24, 1984	House show	Greensboro, NC	4	7	6		
—	Vacated	July 1, 1984	—	—	—	—	—	Wahoo McDaniel was stripped of the title due to Tully Blanchard interfering in McDaniel's title defense.	
30	Wahoo McDaniel	October 7, 1984	House show	Charlotte, NC	5	167	167	Defeated Manny Fernandez in a tournament final for the vacant title.	
31	Magnum T. A.	March 23, 1985	World Wide Wrestling	Charlotte, NC	1	120	119		
32	Tully Blanchard	July 21, 1985	House show	Charlotte, NC	1	130	129		
33	Magnum T. A.	November 28, 1985	Starrcade	Greensboro, NC	2	182	153	This was an "I Quit" steel cage match. WWE recognizes Magnum T. A. as being stripped of the title on May 1, 1986.	
—	Vacated	May 29, 1986	—	—	—	—	—	Magnum T. A. was stripped of the title for attacking NWA president Bob Geigel.	
34	Nikita Koloff	August 17, 1986	House show	Charlotte, NC	1	328	327	Defeated Magnum T. A. in a best of seven series for the vacant title, Koloff defeated Wahoo McDaniel on September 28, 1986 to unify the NWA National Heavyweight Championship into the U.S. title.	
35	Lex Luger	July 11, 1987	Great American Bash	Greensboro, NC	1	138	137	This was a steel cage match.	
36	Dusty Rhodes	November 26, 1987	Starrcade	Chicago, IL	1	141	140	This was a steel cage match.	
—	Vacated	April 9, 1988	—	—	—	—	—	Dusty Rhodes was stripped of the title and suspended for 120 days for attacking NWA President Jim Crockett.	
37	Barry Windham	May 13, 1988	House show	Houston, TX	1	283	282	Defeated Nikita Koloff in a tournament final for the vacant title.	
National Wrestling Alliance (NWA) / World Championship Wrestling (WCW)
38	Lex Luger	February 20, 1989	Chi-Town Rumble	Chicago, IL	2	76	75		
39	Michael Hayes	May 7, 1989	WrestleWar	Nashville, TN	1	15	14		
40	Lex Luger	May 22, 1989	House show	Bluefield, WV	3	523	522	Aired on World Wide Wrestling on June 10, 1989.	
41	Stan Hansen	October 27, 1990	Halloween Havoc	Chicago, IL	1	50	49		
42	Lex Luger	December 16, 1990	Starrcade	St. Louis, MO	4	210	209	This was a Texas Bullrope match. During Luger's reign in 1991, World Championship Wrestling (WCW) split from the NWA and the title was renamed as the WCW United States Heavyweight Championship.	
World Championship Wrestling (WCW)
—	Vacated	July 14, 1991	The Great American Bash	Baltimore, MD	—	—	—	Vacated when Lex Luger won the WCW World Heavyweight Championship.	
43	Sting	August 25, 1991	House show	Atlanta, GA	1	86	85	Defeated Steve Austin in a tournament final for the vacant title.	
44	Rick Rude	November 19, 1991	Clash of the Champions XVII	Savannah, GA	1	378	377		
—	Vacated	December 1, 1992	—	—	—	—	—	Vacated due to Rick Rude suffering an injury.	
45	Dustin Rhodes	January 11, 1993	Saturday Night	Atlanta, GA	1	138	109	Defeated Ricky Steamboat in a match that was originally made to determine the No. 1 contender. But, upon Rick Rude's vacating the title, the match was instead made to decide the new champion. Aired on tape delay on January 16, 1993. WWE's official title history incorrectly lists his reign as lasting 109 days, ending on May 1, 1993.	
—	Vacated	May 29, 1993	Saturday Night	—	—	—	—	The WCW Board of Directors announced the title had been held-up, several weeks after Rhodes' controversial title defense against Rick Rude that ended in Rude appearing to win via pinfall, and taking possession of the title belt, despite both wrestlers' shoulders being off the mat.	
46	Dustin Rhodes	August 30, 1993	Saturday Night	Atlanta, GA	2	119	118	Defeated Rick Rude in a rematch for the vacant title. Aired on tape delay on September 11, 1993.	
47	Steve Austin	December 27, 1993	Starrcade '93: 10th Anniversary	Charlotte, NC	1	240	239	This was a two out of three falls match.	
48	Ricky Steamboat	August 24, 1994	Clash of the Champions XXVIII	Cedar Rapids, IA	4	25	24		
49	Steve Austin	September 18, 1994	Fall Brawl 1994: War Games	Roanoke, VA	2	<1	<1	Awarded the title due to Ricky Steamboat being injured.	
50	Jim Duggan	September 18, 1994	Fall Brawl 1994: War Games	Roanoke, VA	1	100	99		
51	Vader	December 27, 1994	Starrcade	Nashville, TN	1	88	87		
—	Vacated	March 25, 1995	Saturday Night	Atlanta, GA	—	—	—	Vader was stripped of the title by WCW commissioner Nick Bockwinkel for hospitalizing Dave Sullivan one week prior.	
52	Sting	June 18, 1995	The Great American Bash	Dayton, OH	2	148	147	Defeated Meng in a tournament final for the vacant title.	
53	Kensuke Sasaki	November 13, 1995	WCW World in Japan	Tokyo, Japan	1	44	43	Won the title at a New Japan Pro-Wrestling event.	
54	One Man Gang	December 27, 1995	Starrcade: World Cup of Wrestling	Nashville, TN	1	33	32	Won in a post-PPV dark match. Although the match was restarted and Kensuke Sasaki subsequently retained the title, it was never acknowledged by WCW, nor is it acknowledged by WWE.	
55	Konnan	January 29, 1996	Main Event	Canton, OH	1	160	159		
56	Ric Flair	July 7, 1996	Bash at the Beach	Daytona Beach, FL	5^{(6)}	141	140		
—	Vacated	November 25, 1996	—	—	—	—	—	Vacated due to Ric Flair suffering a shoulder injury.	
57	Eddie Guerrero	December 29, 1996	Starrcade	Nashville, TN	1	77	76	Defeated Diamond Dallas Page in a tournament final for the vacant title.	
58	Dean Malenko	March 16, 1997	Uncensored	North Charleston, SC	1	85	84	This was a no disqualification match	
59	Jeff Jarrett	June 9, 1997	Nitro	Boston, MA	1	73	72		
60	Steve McMichael	August 21, 1997	Clash of the Champions XXXV	Nashville, TN	1	25	24		
61	Curt Hennig	September 15, 1997	Nitro	Charlotte, NC	1	104	103		
62	Diamond Dallas Page	December 28, 1997	Starrcade	Washington, D.C.	1	112	111		
63	Raven	April 19, 1998	Spring Stampede	Denver, CO	1	1	<1	This was a "Raven's Rules" match.	
64	Goldberg	April 20, 1998	Nitro	Colorado Springs, CO	1	77	90	This was a "Raven's Rules" match. WWE's official title history incorrectly lists Goldberg's reign as lasting 90 days, ending on July 20, 1998.	
—	Vacated	July 6, 1998	Nitro	Atlanta, GA	—	—	—	Vacated when Goldberg won the WCW World Heavyweight Championship.	
65	Bret Hart	July 20, 1998	Nitro	Salt Lake City, UT	1	21	20	Defeated Diamond Dallas Page for the vacant title.	
66	Lex Luger	August 10, 1998	Nitro	Rapid City, SD	5	3	2		
67	Bret Hart	August 13, 1998	Thunder	Fargo, ND	2	74	73		
68	Diamond Dallas Page	October 26, 1998	Nitro	Phoenix, AZ	2	35	34		
69	Bret Hart	November 30, 1998	Nitro	Chattanooga, TN	3	70	69	This was a no disqualification match.	
70	Roddy Piper	February 8, 1999	Nitro	Buffalo, NY	3	13	12		
71	Scott Hall	February 21, 1999	SuperBrawl IX	Oakland, CA	1	25	24		
—	Vacated	March 18, 1999	Thunder	Lexington, KY	—	—	—	Scott Hall was stripped of the title by WCW President Ric Flair.	
72	Scott Steiner	April 11, 1999	Spring Stampede	Tacoma, WA	1	85	84	Defeated Booker T in a tournament final for the vacant title.	
—	Vacated	July 5, 1999	Nitro	Atlanta, GA	—	—	—	Scott Steiner was stripped of the title by WCW President Ric Flair.	
73	David Flair	July 5, 1999	Nitro	Atlanta, GA	1	35	34	Awarded the title by his father, WCW President Ric Flair.	
74	Chris Benoit	August 9, 1999	Nitro	Boise, ID	1	34	33		
75	Sid Vicious	September 12, 1999	Fall Brawl	Winston-Salem, NC	1	42	41		
76	Goldberg	October 24, 1999	Halloween Havoc	Paradise, NV	2	1	<1	Won the title when Sid Vicious suffered excessive bleeding and the referee stopped the match.	
77	Bret Hart	October 25, 1999	Nitro	Phoenix, AZ	4	14	13		
78	Scott Hall	November 8, 1999	Nitro	Indianapolis, IN	2	41	40	This was a four-way ladder match, also involving Sid Vicious and Goldberg.	
79	Chris Benoit	December 19, 1999	Starrcade	Washington, D.C.	2	1	<1	Awarded the title when Scott Hall suffered a knee injury during the match.	
80	Jeff Jarrett	December 20, 1999	Nitro	Baltimore, MD	2	27	26	This was a ladder match.	
—	Vacated	January 16, 2000	Souled Out	Cincinnati, OH	—	—	—	Vacated due to Jeff Jarrett suffering an injury.	
81	Jeff Jarrett	January 17, 2000	Nitro	Columbus, OH	3	84	83	Awarded by WCW Commissioner Kevin Nash.	
—	Vacated	April 10, 2000	Nitro	Denver, CO	—	—	—	All WCW titles were declared vacant by Vince Russo and Eric Bischoff after WCW was rebooted.	
82	Scott Steiner	April 16, 2000	Spring Stampede	Chicago, IL	2	84	83	Defeated Sting in a tournament final for the vacant title.	
—	Vacated	July 9, 2000	Bash at the Beach	Daytona Beach, FL	—	—	—	Scott Steiner was stripped of the title when he used the banned Steiner Recliner submission hold on Mike Awesome.	
83	Lance Storm	July 18, 2000	Nitro	Auburn Hills, MI	1	66	65	Defeated Mike Awesome in a tournament final for the vacant title. Storm unofficially renamed the title the WCW Canadian Heavyweight Championship.	
84	Terry Funk	September 22, 2000	House show	Amarillo, TX	2	1	<1	This title change was not recognized by WCW, but is recognized by WWE.	
85	Lance Storm	September 23, 2000	House show	Lubbock, TX	2	36	35	This title change was not recognized by WCW, but is recognized by WWE.	
86	Gen. Rection	October 29, 2000	Halloween Havoc	Paradise, NV	1	12	14	Defeated Lance Storm and Jim Duggan in a handicap match. WWE recognizes his reign as ending on November 13, 2000, when the following episode aired on tape delay.	
87	Lance Storm	November 10, 2000	Nitro	London, England	3	16	12	WWE recognizes his reign as beginning on November 13, 2000, when the episode aired on tape delay.	
88	Gen. Rection	November 26, 2000	Mayhem	Milwaukee, WI	2	49	48		
89	Shane Douglas	January 14, 2001	Sin	Indianapolis, IN	1	22	21	This was a First Blood Chain match.	
90	Rick Steiner	February 5, 2001	Nitro	Tupelo, MS	1	41	40		
91	Booker T	March 18, 2001	Greed	Jacksonville, FL	1	128	127	The title and other selected assets of WCW were purchased by the World Wrestling Federation (WWF). It was subsequently referred to as the WCW United States Championship and was defended on WWF programming.	
World Wrestling Federation (WWF)
92	Chris Kanyon	July 24, 2001	SmackDown!	Pittsburgh, PA	1	48	45	Given the title by Booker T as he was also the WCW Champion. WWE recognizes Kanyon's reign as beginning on July 26, 2001, when the episode aired on tape delay.	
93	Tajiri	September 10, 2001	Raw	San Antonio, TX	1	13	12		
94	Rhyno	September 23, 2001	Unforgiven	Pittsburgh, PA	1	29	28		
95	Kurt Angle	October 22, 2001	Raw	Kansas City, MO	1	21	20		
96	Edge	November 12, 2001	Raw	Boston, MA	1	6	5		
—	Unified	November 18, 2001	Survivor Series	Greensboro, NC	—	—	—	Edge defeated WWF Intercontinental Champion Test in a title unification match. Edge became the Intercontinental Champion while the United States title was deactivated. In May 2002, the WWF became WWE.	
World Wrestling Entertainment (WWE): SmackDown
97	Eddie Guerrero	July 27, 2003	Vengeance	Denver, CO	2	84	83	The title was reactivated as the WWE United States Championship as an exclusive title of the SmackDown brand. Guerrero defeated Chris Benoit in a tournament final for the revived title.	
98	Big Show	October 19, 2003	No Mercy	Baltimore, MD	1	147	147		
99	John Cena	March 14, 2004	WrestleMania XX	New York, NY	1	114	114	WWE's official title history incorrectly lists Cena's reign as lasting 136 days, ending on July 29, 2004. The match description for Booker T's title win states that Cena was stripped of the title "a few weeks prior" to the July 29, 2004 tape delay episode of SmackDown!	
—	Vacated	July 6, 2004	SmackDown!	Winnipeg, MB, Canada	—	—	—	John Cena was stripped of the title after attacking SmackDown! General Manager Kurt Angle. Aired on tape delay on July 8, 2004.	
100	Booker T	July 27, 2004	SmackDown!	Cincinnati, OH	2	68	65	This was an eight-way elimination match, also involving John Cena, René Duprée, Kenzo Suzuki, Rob Van Dam, Billy Gunn, Charlie Haas, and Luther Reigns. WWE recognizes Booker T's reign as beginning on July 29, 2004, when the episode aired on tape delay.	
101	John Cena	October 3, 2004	No Mercy	East Rutherford, NJ	2	3	3	This was the fifth match of a Best of Five series. WWE recognizes Cena's reign as ending on October 7, 2004, when the following episode aired on tape delay.	
102	Carlito Caribbean Cool	October 5, 2004	SmackDown!	Boston, MA	1	42	41	WWE recognizes Carlito's reign as beginning on October 7, 2004 and ending on November 18, 2004, both episodes of which aired on tape delay.	
103	John Cena	November 16, 2004	SmackDown!	Dayton, OH	3	105	105	WWE recognizes Cena's reign as beginning on November 18, 2004 and ending on March 3, 2005, both episodes of which aired on tape delay.	
104	Orlando Jordan	March 1, 2005	SmackDown!	Albany, NY	1	173	170	WWE recognizes Jordan's reign as beginning on March 3, 2005, when the episode aired on tape delay.	
105	Chris Benoit	August 21, 2005	SummerSlam	Washington, D.C.	3	58	60	WWE recognizes Benoit's reign as ending on October 21, 2005, when the following episode aired on tape delay.	
106	Booker T	October 18, 2005	SmackDown!	Reno, NV	3	35	34	WWE recognizes Booker T's reign as beginning on October 21, 2005 and ending on November 25, 2005, both episodes of which aired on tape delay.	
—	Vacated	November 22, 2005	SmackDown!	Sheffield, England	—	—	—	Vacated when Booker T's title defense against Chris Benoit ended in a double pinfall. Aired on tape delay on November 25, 2005.	
107	Booker T	January 10, 2006	SmackDown!	Philadelphia, PA	4	40	36	Booker T faced Chris Benoit in a Best of Seven series, winning the first three matches; Randy Orton substituted for Booker T after that due to injury, losing the next three matches, but winning the final for the vacant title. WWE recognizes Booker T's reign as beginning on January 13, 2006, when the episode aired on tape delay.	
108	Chris Benoit	February 19, 2006	No Way Out	Baltimore, MD	4	42	41		
109	John "Bradshaw" Layfield	April 2, 2006	WrestleMania 22	Rosemont, IL	1	51	53	WWE recognizes JBL's reign as ending on May 26, 2006, when the following episode aired on tape delay.	
110	Bobby Lashley	May 23, 2006	SmackDown!	Bakersfield, CA	1	49	48	WWE recognizes Lashley's reign as beginning on May 26, 2006 and ending on July 14, 2006, both episodes of which aired on tape delay.	
111	Finlay	July 11, 2006	SmackDown!	Minneapolis, MN	1	49	48	WWE recognizes Finlay's reign as beginning on July 14, 2006 and ending on September 1, 2006, both episodes of which aired on tape delay.	
112	Mr. Kennedy	August 29, 2006	SmackDown!	Reading, PA	1	42	41	This was a triple threat match, also involving Bobby Lashley who Kennedy pinned. WWE recognizes Kennedy's reign as beginning on September 1, 2006 and ending on October 13, 2006, both episodes of which aired on tape delay.	
113	Chris Benoit	October 10, 2006	SmackDown!	Jacksonville, FL	5	222	218	WWE recognizes Benoit's reign as beginning on October 13, 2006, when the episode aired on tape delay.	
114	Montel Vontavious Porter	May 20, 2007	Judgment Day	St. Louis, MO	1	343	342	This was a two out of three falls match.	
115	Matt Hardy	April 27, 2008	Backlash	Baltimore, MD	1	84	83	The title became exclusive to the ECW brand following the 2008 WWE Draft.	
WWE: ECW
116	Shelton Benjamin	July 20, 2008	The Great American Bash	Uniondale, NY	1	240	242	The title was returned to SmackDown due to Benjamin's status as a SmackDown wrestler.	
WWE: SmackDown
117	Montel Vontavious Porter	March 17, 2009	SmackDown	Corpus Christi, TX	2	76	72	The title became exclusive to the Raw brand following the 2009 WWE Draft.	
WWE: Raw
118	Kofi Kingston	June 1, 2009	Raw	Birmingham, AL	1	126	125		
119	The Miz	October 5, 2009	Raw	Wilkes-Barre, PA	1	224	223		
120	Bret Hart	May 17, 2010	Raw	Toronto, ON, Canada	5	7	6	This was a no disqualification, no countout match.	
—	Vacated	May 24, 2010	Raw	Toledo, OH	—	—	—	Vacated when Bret Hart became the Raw General Manager.	
121	R-Truth	May 24, 2010	Raw	Toledo, OH	1	21	20	Defeated The Miz to win the vacant title.	
122	The Miz	June 14, 2010	Raw	Charlotte, NC	2	97	96	This was a fatal four-way match, also involving John Morrison and Zack Ryder.	
123	Daniel Bryan	September 19, 2010	Night of Champions	Rosemont, IL	1	176	176		
124	Sheamus	March 14, 2011	Raw	St. Louis, MO	1	48	47	If Sheamus lost, he would have quit WWE. Title became exclusive to the SmackDown brand following the 2011 WWE Draft.	
WWE: SmackDown
125	Kofi Kingston	May 1, 2011	Extreme Rules	Tampa, FL	2	49	48	This was a tables match. The title became exclusive to Raw due to Kingston's status as a Raw wrestler.	
WWE: Raw
126	Dolph Ziggler	June 19, 2011	Capitol Punishment	Washington, D.C.	1	182	181	On August 29, 2011, the brand extension ended, allowing the United States Champion to appear on both Raw and SmackDown.	
WWE (unbranded)
127	Zack Ryder	December 18, 2011	TLC: Tables, Ladders & Chairs	Baltimore, MD	1	29	28		
128	Jack Swagger	January 16, 2012	Raw	Anaheim, CA	1	49	49		
129	Santino Marella	March 5, 2012	Raw	Boston, MA	1	167	166		
130	Antonio Cesaro	August 19, 2012	SummerSlam; Pre-Show	Los Angeles, CA	1	239	239		
131	Kofi Kingston	April 15, 2013	Raw	Greenville, SC	3	34	34		
132	Dean Ambrose	May 19, 2013	Extreme Rules	St. Louis, MO	1	351	350		
133	Sheamus	May 5, 2014	Raw	Albany, NY	2	182	182	This was a 20-man battle royal. Sheamus lastly eliminated Dean Ambrose to win the match and the title.	
134	Rusev	November 3, 2014	Raw Backstage Pass	Buffalo, NY	1	146	145		
135	John Cena	March 29, 2015	WrestleMania 31	Santa Clara, CA	4	147	147		
136	Seth Rollins	August 23, 2015	SummerSlam	Brooklyn, NY	1	28	28	This was a winner takes all match, in which Rollins defended the WWE World Heavyweight Championship.	
137	John Cena	September 20, 2015	Night of Champions	Houston, TX	5	35	35		
138	Alberto Del Rio	October 25, 2015	Hell in a Cell	Los Angeles, CA	1	78	78		
139	Kalisto	January 11, 2016	Raw	New Orleans, LA	1	1	2	WWE recognizes Kalisto's reign as ending on January 14, 2016, when the following episode aired on tape delay.	
140	Alberto Del Rio	January 12, 2016	SmackDown	Lafayette, LA	2	12	10	WWE recognizes Del Rio's reign as beginning on January 14, 2016, when the episode aired on tape delay.	
141	Kalisto	January 24, 2016	Royal Rumble	Orlando, FL	2	119	119		
142	Rusev	May 22, 2016	Extreme Rules	Newark, NJ	2	126	126	The brand extension returned in July and the title became exclusive to the Raw brand following the 2016 WWE Draft.	
WWE: Raw
143	Roman Reigns	September 25, 2016	Clash of Champions	Indianapolis, IN	1	106	106		
144	Chris Jericho	January 9, 2017	Raw	New Orleans, LA	1	83	82	This was a 2-on-1 handicap match, also involving Kevin Owens, who teamed with Jericho. Jericho pinned Roman Reigns to win the title.	
145	Kevin Owens	April 2, 2017	WrestleMania 33	Orlando, FL	1	28	28	The title became exclusive to the SmackDown brand following the 2017 WWE Superstar Shake-up.	
WWE: SmackDown
146	Chris Jericho	April 30, 2017	Payback	San Jose, CA	2	2	2	Since Jericho won, he was transferred to the SmackDown brand.	
147	Kevin Owens	May 2, 2017	SmackDown	Fresno, CA	2	66	65		
148	AJ Styles	July 7, 2017	WWE Live	New York, NY	1	16	16		
149	Kevin Owens	July 23, 2017	Battleground	Philadelphia, PA	3	2	2		
150	AJ Styles	July 25, 2017	SmackDown	Richmond, VA	2	75	74	This was a triple threat match also involving Chris Jericho, who Styles pinned.	
151	Baron Corbin	October 8, 2017	Hell in a Cell	Detroit, MI	1	70	69	This was a triple threat match also involving Tye Dillinger, who Corbin pinned.	
152	Dolph Ziggler	December 17, 2017	Clash of Champions	Boston, MA	2	9	8	This was a triple threat match also involving Bobby Roode.	
—	Vacated	December 26, 2017	SmackDown	Rosemont, IL	—	—	—	SmackDown General Manager Daniel Bryan ruled that Dolph Ziggler vacated the title after he left the belt in the ring on the December 19 episode of SmackDown.	
153	Bobby Roode	January 16, 2018	SmackDown	Laredo, TX	1	54	53	Defeated Jinder Mahal in a tournament final to win the vacant title.	
154	Randy Orton	March 11, 2018	Fastlane	Columbus, OH	1	28	27		
155	Jinder Mahal	April 8, 2018	WrestleMania 34	New Orleans, LA	1	8	8	This was a fatal four-way match, also involving Bobby Roode and Rusev who Mahal pinned. The title became exclusive to the Raw brand following the first night of the 2018 WWE Superstar Shake-up.	
WWE: Raw
156	Jeff Hardy	April 16, 2018	Raw	Hartford, CT	1	90	89	Title transferred back to the SmackDown brand on the second night of the 2018 WWE Superstar Shake-up.	
WWE: SmackDown
157	Shinsuke Nakamura	July 15, 2018	Extreme Rules	Pittsburgh, PA	1	156	163	WWE recognizes Nakamura's reign as ending on December 25, 2018, when the following episode aired on tape delay.	
158	Rusev	December 18, 2018	SmackDown	Fresno, CA	3	40	32	WWE recognizes Rusev's reign as beginning on December 25, 2018, when the episode aired on tape delay.	
159	Shinsuke Nakamura	January 27, 2019	Royal Rumble; Kickoff	Phoenix, AZ	2	2	2		
160	R-Truth	January 29, 2019	SmackDown	Phoenix, AZ	2	35	35		
161	Samoa Joe	March 5, 2019	SmackDown	Wilkes-Barre, PA	1	75	74	This was a fatal four-way match also involving Rey Mysterio and Andrade, who Joe pinned. The title became exclusive to the Raw brand following the 2019 WWE Superstar Shake-up.	
WWE: Raw
162	Rey Mysterio	May 19, 2019	Money in the Bank	Hartford, CT	1	15	15		
163	Samoa Joe	June 3, 2019	Raw	Austin, TX	2	20	19	Rey Mysterio voluntarily relinquished the title back to Joe due to Mysterio suffering a legitimate shoulder injury and the controversial way in which he won the title at Money in the Bank (Joe's left shoulder was not down when the referee counted the pin).	
164	Ricochet	June 23, 2019	Stomping Grounds	Tacoma, WA	1	21	21		
165	AJ Styles	July 14, 2019	Extreme Rules	Philadelphia, PA	3	134	134		
166	Rey Mysterio	November 25, 2019	Raw	Rosemont, IL	2	31	30		
167	Andrade	December 26, 2019	WWE Live	New York, NY	1	151	150		
168	Apollo Crews	May 25, 2020	Raw	Orlando, FL	1	97	96		
169	Bobby Lashley	August 30, 2020	Payback	Orlando, FL	2	175	175		
170	Riddle	February 21, 2021	Elimination Chamber	St. Petersburg, FL	1	49	49	This was a triple threat match also involving John Morrison, who Riddle pinned.	
171	Sheamus	April 11, 2021	WrestleMania 37; Night 2	Tampa, FL	3	132	131		
172	Damian Priest	August 21, 2021	SummerSlam	Paradise, NV	1	191	191		
173	Finn Bálor	February 28, 2022	Raw	Columbus, OH	1	49	48		
174	Theory	April 18, 2022	Raw	Buffalo, NY	1	75	74		
175	Bobby Lashley	July 2, 2022	Money in the Bank	Paradise, NV	3	100	100		
176	Seth "Freakin" Rollins	October 10, 2022	Raw	Brooklyn, NY	2	47	47		
177	Austin Theory	November 26, 2022	Survivor Series: WarGames	Boston, MA	2	258	257	Austin Theory was formerly known as just Theory. This was a triple threat match, also involving Bobby Lashley. The title became exclusive to the SmackDown brand following the 2023 WWE Draft.	
WWE: SmackDown
178	Rey Mysterio	August 11, 2023	SmackDown	Calgary, AB, Canada	3	85	84	Austin Theory was due to face Santos Escobar, who had won the United States Championship Invitational Tournament, but was taken out by Theory before the match started. WWE Official Adam Pearce then allowed Mysterio to take Escobar's place for the title match.	
179	Logan Paul	November 4, 2023	Crown Jewel	Riyadh, Saudi Arabia	1	273	273		
180	LA Knight	August 3, 2024	SummerSlam	Cleveland, OH	1	119	118		
181	Shinsuke Nakamura	November 30, 2024	Survivor Series: WarGames	Vancouver, BC, Canada	3	97	97		
182	LA Knight	March 7, 2025	SmackDown	Philadelphia, PA	2	43	42		
183	Jacob Fatu	April 19, 2025	WrestleMania 41; Night 1	Paradise, NV	1	70	69		
184	Solo Sikoa	June 28, 2025	Night of Champions	Riyadh, Saudi Arabia	1	62	62		
185	Sami Zayn	August 29, 2025	SmackDown	Décines-Charpieu, France	1	49	48		
186	Ilja Dragunov	October 17, 2025	SmackDown	San Jose, CA	1	63	70	This was an open challenge. WWE recognizes Dragunov's reign as ending on December 26, 2025, when the following episode aired on tape delay.	
187	Carmelo Hayes	December 19, 2025	SmackDown	Grand Rapids, MI	1	98	90	This was an open challenge. WWE recognizes Hayes's reign as beginning on December 26, 2025, when the episode aired on tape delay.	
188	Sami Zayn	March 27, 2026	SmackDown	Pittsburgh, PA	2	23	22	This was an open challenge.	
189	Trick Williams	April 19, 2026	WrestleMania 42; Night 2	Paradise, NV	1	105	104		
190	Baron Corbin	August 2, 2026	SummerSlam; Night 2	Minneapolis, MN	2	35	35		
191	Trick Williams	September 6, 2026	Sunday Night's Main Event	Atlanta, GA	2	71+	71+		

== Combined reigns ==
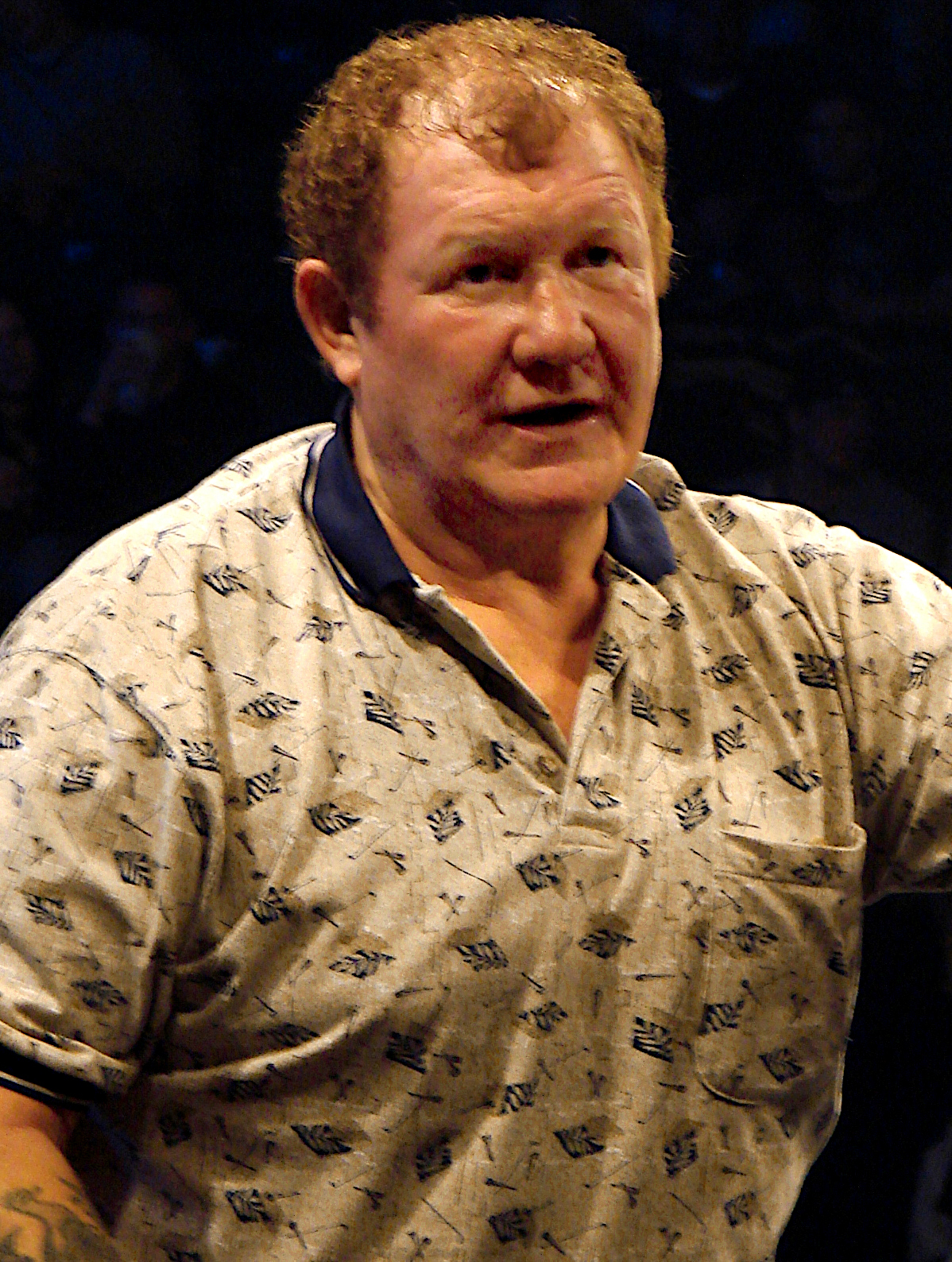
Inaugural champion Harley Race

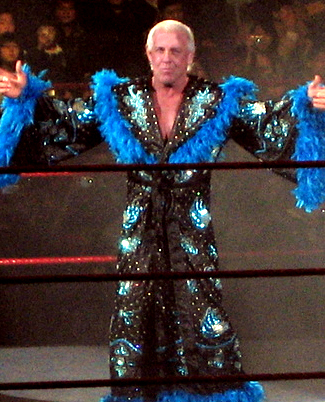
Record six-time champion Ric Flair

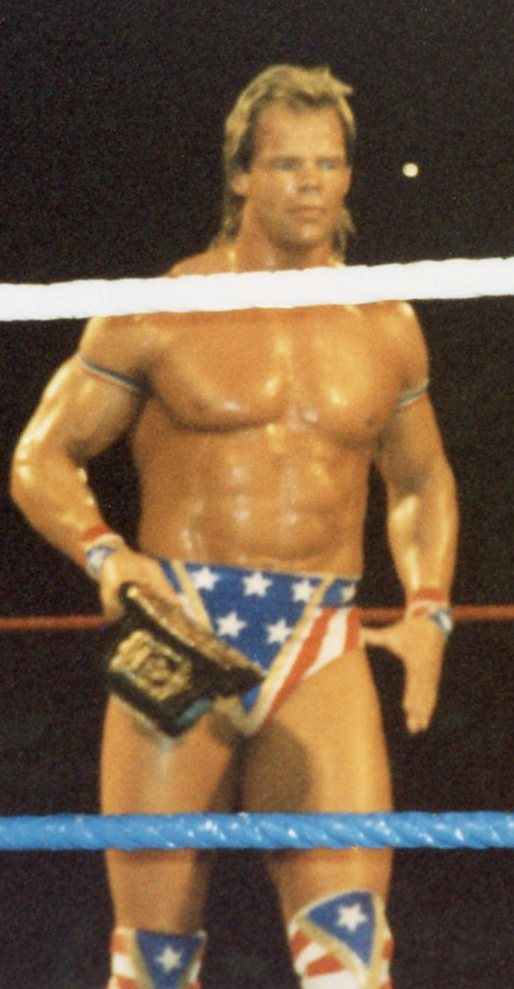
Lex Luger is the longest reigning champion in history, with a record of 523 consecutive days

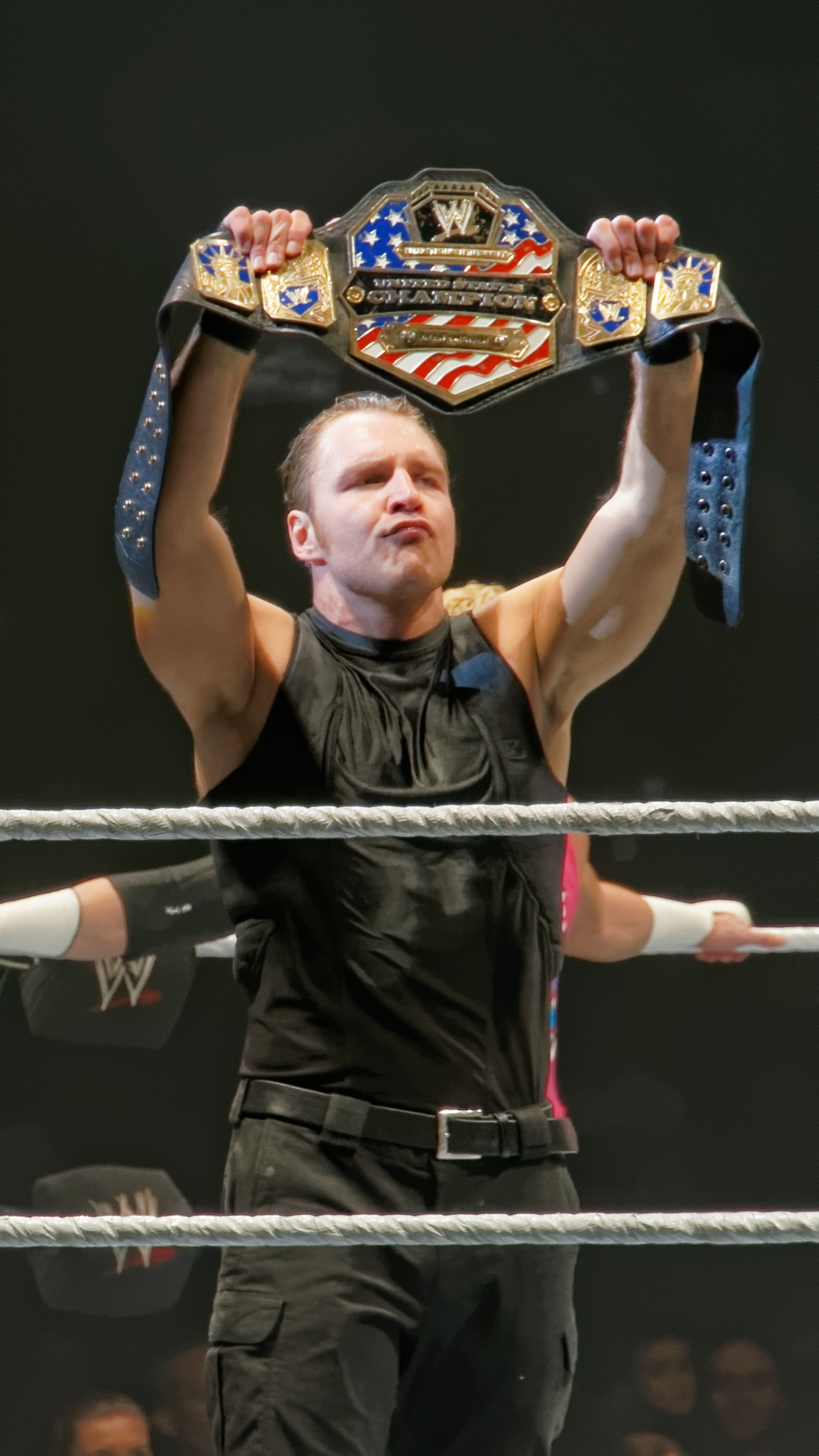
Dean Ambrose is the longest reigning champion under the WWE banner, with a record of 351 consecutive days

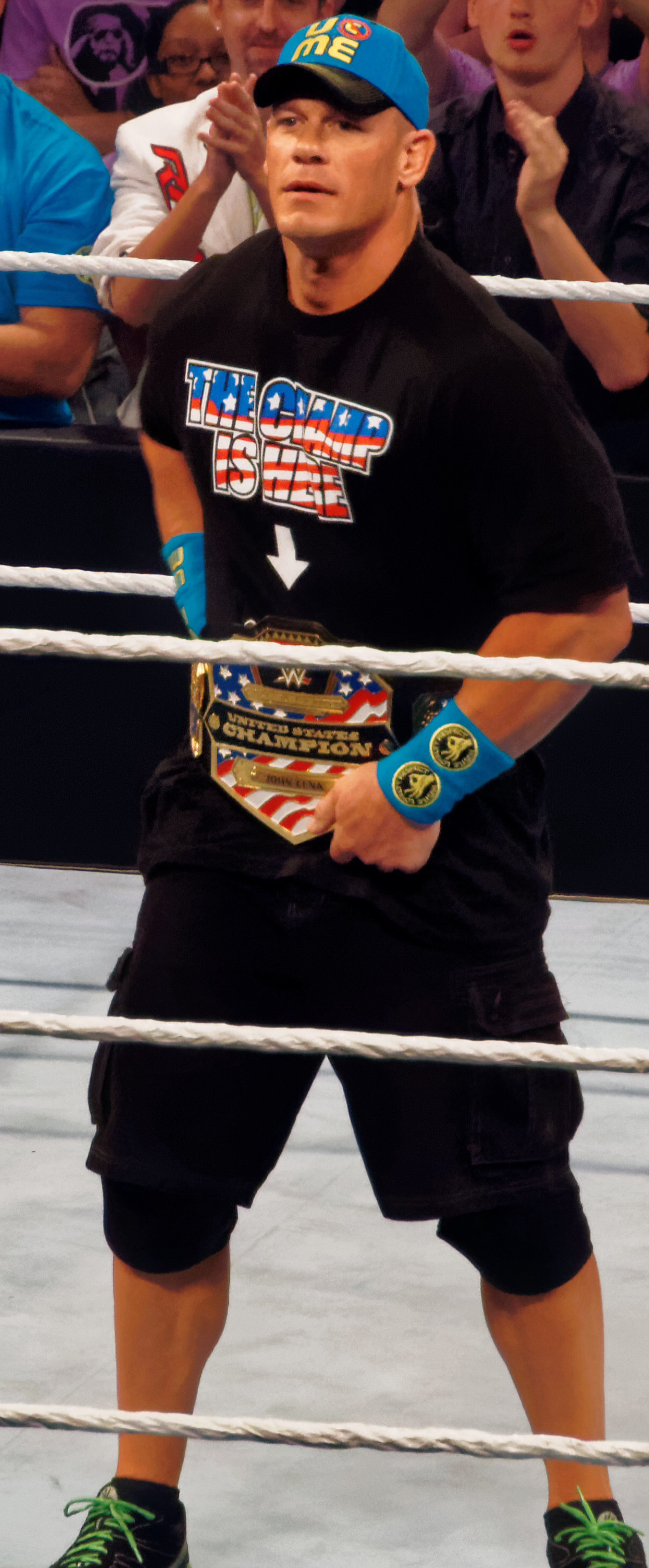
John Cena's five reigns is the most under the WWE banner

As of November 16, 2026.

†	Indicates the current champion

Rank	Wrestler	No. of reigns	Combined days	Combined days rec. by WWE
1	Lex Luger	5	950	
2	Ric Flair	5 (Note: Ric Flair's fifth reign is not typically recognized by WWE, but a WWE.com article recognized him as a 6-time champion.)	773	704
3	Blackjack Mulligan	3 (Note: WWE recognizes Blackjack Mulligan as a 3-time champion. His second reign is not recognized by WWE.)	509	
4	John Cena	5	426	
5	Montel Vontavious Porter	2	419	
6	Greg Valentine	2 (Note: WWE recognizes Greg Valentine as a 2-time champion. His first reign is not recognized by WWE.)	512	390
7	Rick Rude	1	378	
8	Sheamus	3	362	
9	Chris Benoit	5	357	
10	Dean Ambrose	1	351	
11	Austin Theory	2 (Note: During his first reign, Austin Theory was known as just Theory.)	333	331
12	Nikita Koloff	1	328	327
13	Bobby Lashley	3	324	323
14	The Miz	2	321	319
15	Rusev	3	312	303
16	Sgt. Slaughter	2	305	303
17	Magnum T. A.	2	302	272
18	Wahoo McDaniel	5	296	295
19	Barry Windham	1	283	282
20	Logan Paul	1	273	
21	Booker T	4	271	262
22	Ricky Steamboat	4	265	263
23	Dustin Rhodes	2	257	227
24	Shinsuke Nakamura	3	255	262
25	Steve Austin	2	240	239
25	Shelton Benjamin	1	240	242
27	Antonio Cesaro	1	239	
28	Sting	2	234	232
29	Jimmy Snuka	1	231	232
30	AJ Styles	3	225	224
31	Roddy Piper	3	220	219
32	Kofi Kingston	3	209	207
33	Dolph Ziggler	2	191	189
33	Damian Priest	1	191	
35	Bret Hart	5	186	181
36	Jeff Jarrett	3	184	181
37	Harley Race	1	183	
38	Trick Williams †	2	176+	
39	Daniel Bryan	1	176	
40	Orlando Jordan	1	173	170
41	Scott Steiner	2	169	167
42	Santino Marella	1	167	166
43	LA Knight	2	162	160
44	Eddie Guerrero	2	161	159
45	Konnan	1	160	159
46	Paul Jones	2 (Note: WWE recognizes Paul Jones as a 2-time champion. His third reign is not recognized by WWE.)	156	148
47	Andrade	1	151	150
48	Diamond Dallas Page	2	147	145
48	Big Show	1	147	146
50	Dusty Rhodes	1	141	140
51	Rey Mysterio	3	131	129
52	Tully Blanchard	1	130	129
53	Dick Slater	1	129	
54	Kalisto	2	120	
55	Lance Storm	3	118	112
56	Roman Reigns	1	106	
57	Baron Corbin	2	105	104
58	Curt Hennig	1	104	103
59	Jim Duggan	1	100	99
60	Carmelo Hayes	1	98	91
61	Apollo Crews	1	97	96
62	Kevin Owens	3	96	95
63	Samoa Joe	2	95	93
64	Johnny Valentine	1	93	92
65	Alberto Del Rio	2	90	89
65	Jeff Hardy	1	90	89
67	Big Van Vader	1	88	87
68	Chris Jericho	2	85	84
68	Dean Malenko	1	85	84
70	Matt Hardy	1	84	83
71	Goldberg	2	78	90
72	Seth Rollins	2	75	
73	Sami Zayn	2	72	70
74	Jacob Fatu	1	70	
75	Scott Hall	2	65	64
76	Ilja Dragunov	1	63	70
77	Solo Sikoa	1	62	
78	Gen. Rection	2	61	62
79	R-Truth	2	56	55
80	Bobby Roode	1	54	53
81	John "Bradshaw" Layfield	1	51	53
82	Stan Hansen	1	50	49
83	Jack Swagger	1	49	
83	Finlay	1	49	48
83	Finn Bálor	1	49	48
83	Riddle	1	49	
87	Chris Kanyon	1	48	45
88	Kensuke Sasaki	1	44	43
89	Carlito Caribbean Cool	1	42	41
89	Mr. Kennedy	1	42	41
89	Sid Vicious	1	42	41
92	Rick Steiner	1	41	40
93	David Flair	1	35	34
94	One Man Gang	1	33	32
95	Rhyno	1	29	28
95	Zack Ryder	1	29	28
97	Randy Orton	1	28	27
98	Steve McMichael	1	25	24
99	Bobo Brazil	1	22	21
99	Shane Douglas	1	22	21
101	Kurt Angle	1	21	20
101	Mr. Wrestling	1	21	
101	Ricochet	1	21	
104	Terry Funk	2	19	18
105	Michael Hayes	1	15	14
106	Tajiri	1	13	12
107	Jinder Mahal	1	8	
108	Edge	1	6	5
109	Raven	1	1	<1
