= WWE Judgment Day (2005) =

World Wrestling Entertainment pay-per-view event

Judgment Day
- Promotional poster featuring John Cena
- Promotion: World Wrestling Entertainment
- Brand: SmackDown!
- Date: May 22, 2005
- City: Minneapolis, Minnesota, US
- Venue: Target Center
- Attendance: 12,000
- Buy rate: 220,000

Pay-per-view chronology
← Previous; Backlash	Next → ECW One Night Stand

Judgment Day chronology
← Previous; 2004	Next → 2006

The 2005 Judgment Day was a professional wrestling pay-per-view (PPV) event produced by World Wrestling Entertainment (WWE). It was the seventh Judgment Day and took place on May 22, 2005, at the Target Center in Minneapolis, Minnesota, held exclusively for wrestlers from the promotion's SmackDown! brand division.

The main event was an "I Quit" match in which John Cena defeated John "Bradshaw" Layfield (JBL) to retain his championship. Two featured bouts were scheduled on the undercard. In respective standard wrestling matches, Rey Mysterio defeated Eddie Guerrero by disqualification and Booker T defeated Kurt Angle.

Judgment Day grossed over $500,000 in ticket sales from an attendance of 9,500, and received 220,000 pay-per-view buys. This event helped WWE increase its pay-per-view revenue by $4.7 million compared to the previous year.

== Production ==
=== Background ===
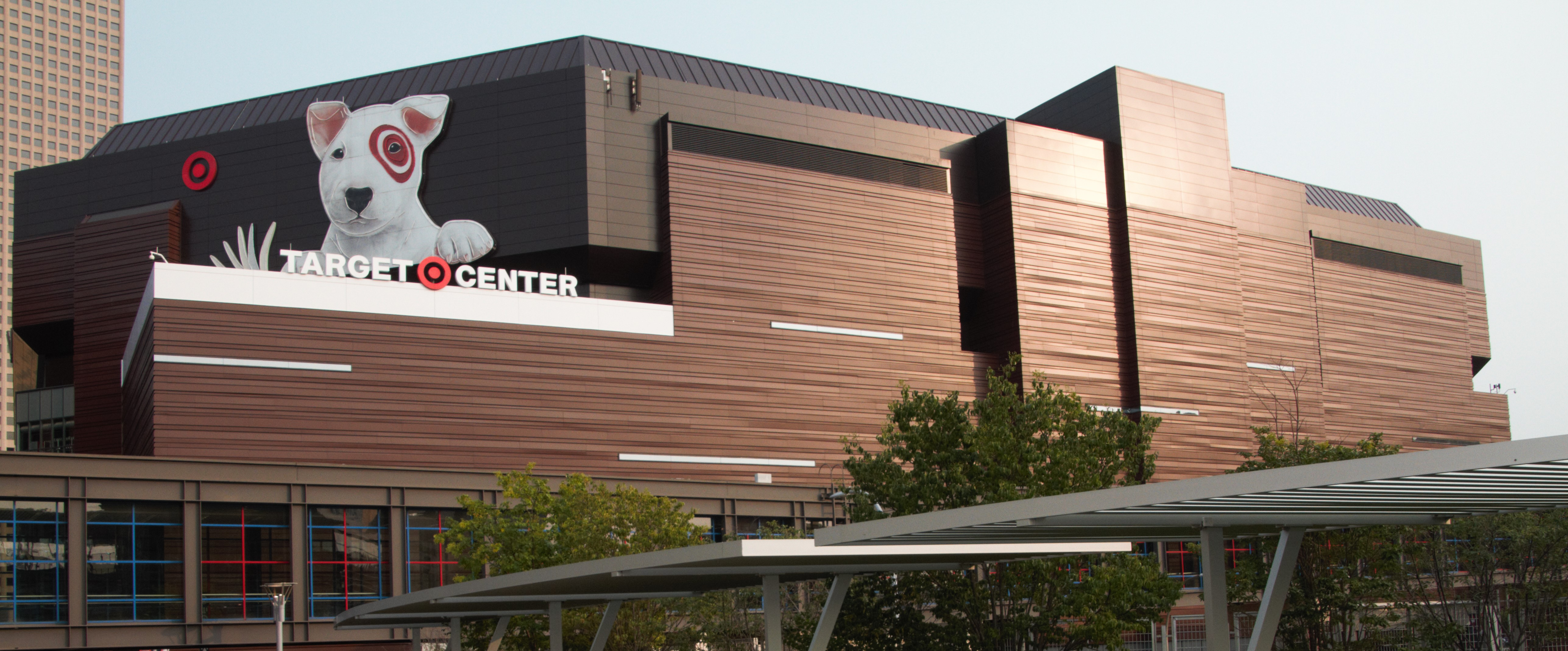
The event was held at the Target Center in Minneapolis, Minnesota.

Judgment Day was a professional wrestling pay-per-view (PPV) event first held by World Wrestling Entertainment (WWE) as the 25th In Your House PPV event in October 1998. Following the discontinuation of the In Your House series in February 1999, Judgment Day was reinstated in May 2000 as its own PPV event, establishing Judgment Day as the promotion's annual May PPV. The seventh event was held on May 22, 2005, at the Target Center in Minneapolis, Minnesota. Like the previous year's event, it was held exclusively for wrestlers from the SmackDown! brand.

=== Storylines ===
The event featured seven professional wrestling matches that resulted from scripted storylines. Results were predetermined by WWE's writers on the SmackDown! brand, while storylines were produced on WWE's weekly television show, SmackDown!.

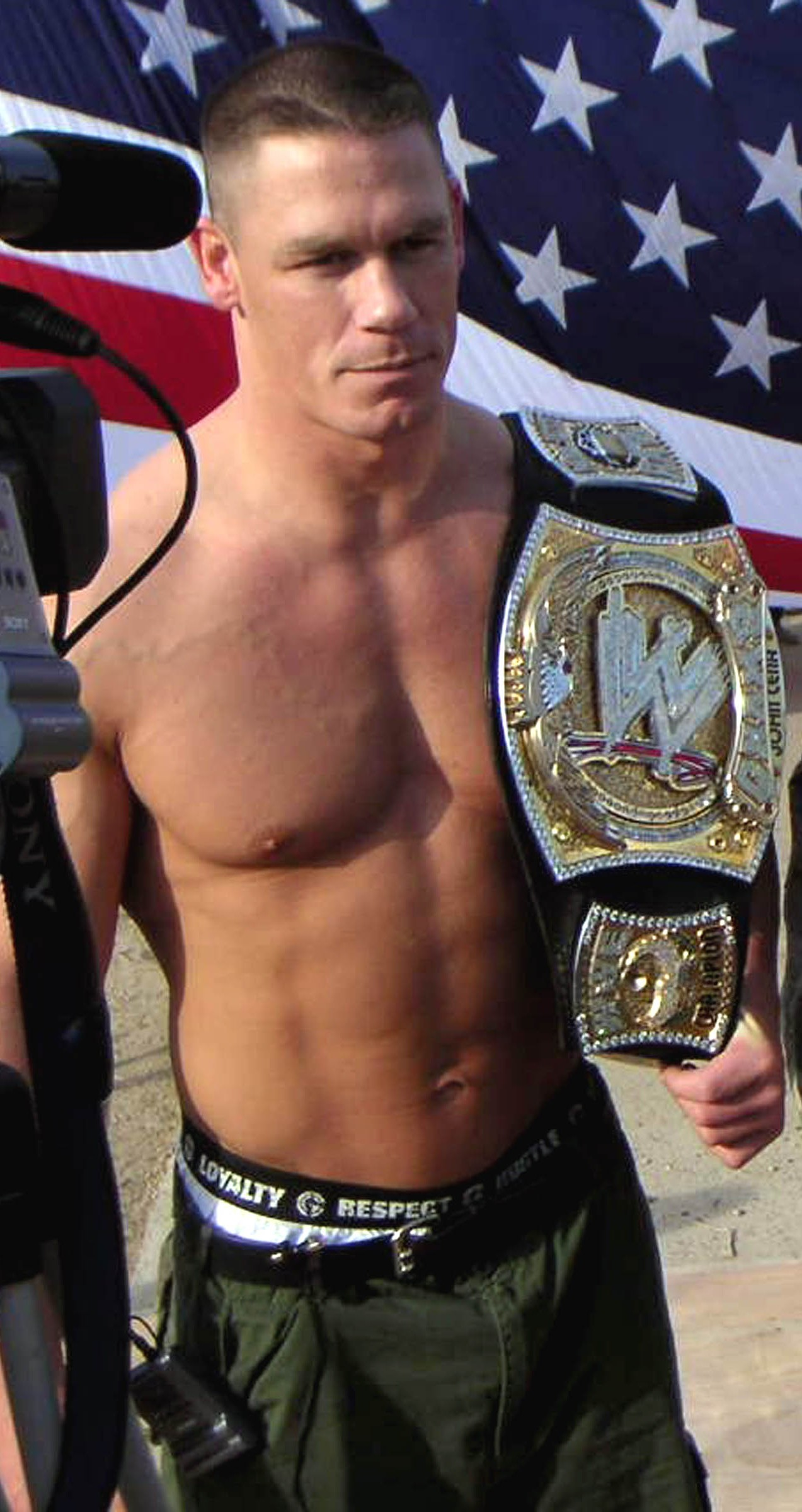
John Cena as WWE Champion

The main event at Judgment Day was between John Cena and John "Bradshaw" Layfield (JBL) over the WWE Championship in an "I Quit" match. The previous month at WrestleMania 21, Cena defeated JBL to win the WWE Championship. On the April 7 episode of SmackDown!, SmackDown! general manager Theodore Long scheduled a series of number one contenders matches, after JBL, Eddie Guerrero, Rey Mysterio, Big Show, Booker T, and Kurt Angle all demanded a WWE Championship match. The first match that Long announced was between JBL and Rey Mysterio. Mysterio was disqualified, after Eddie Guerrero interfered and attacked JBL, resulting in JBL winning the match. The following week on SmackDown!, Guerrero and Kurt Angle were scheduled for the second contender's match. Angle advanced to the finals, as he went on to defeat Guerrero. Later during the program, Cena unveiled a spinner version of the WWE championship. Before the unveiling, however, JBL came out wearing the original WWE championship. On the April 21 episode of SmackDown!, Booker T and Big Show were booked in another contenders match. After the match ended in a double disqualification, Long booked JBL, Angle, Booker T, and Big Show in a fatal four-way elimination match for the following week. JBL won the match, after he last eliminated Angle and having the right to face Cena at Judgment Day for the WWE Championship. On the May 5 episode of SmackDown!, Cena proposed that he would defend the championship against JBL in an "I Quit" match. He also told JBL "I am gonna beat the hell of you for everything that I stand for", and ends the segment by saying "The last two words to come out of your pathetic mouth will be I Quit". Two weeks later, on the May 19 episode, JBL faced Scotty 2 Hotty, which Scotty won after JBL was disqualified. After the match, however, JBL attacked Scotty and demanded that he say "I quit." JBL continued the assault, choking him with a leather belt, Scotty said "I quit." That same night, Cena defeated The Basham Brothers (Doug Basham and Danny Basham) in a handicap match. During the duration of the match, JBL, who was at ringside, yelled at Cena, telling him to say "I quit."

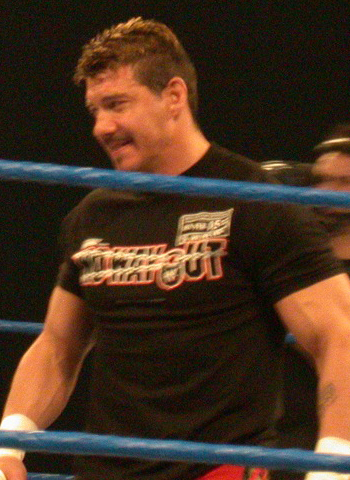
Eddie Guerrero, who faced off against Rey Mysterio

One of the featured preliminary matches was Rey Mysterio versus Eddie Guerrero in a singles match. One month prior to Judgment Day, at WrestleMania 21, Mysterio defeated Guerrero. In the weeks that followed, Guerrero and Mysterio were challenged by MNM (Joey Mercury, Johnny Nitro, and Melina) to defend the WWE Tag Team Championship, which Guerrero and Mysterio accepted. MNM defeated Guerrero and Mysterio to win the WWE Tag Team Championship. On the April 28 episode of SmackDown!, Guerrero and Mysterio were given a rematch for the WWE Tag Team Championship. During the match, however, Mysterio accidentally performed a flying body press on Guerrero which led to Guerrero abandoning Mysterio, but returned as the fans urged Guerrero to come back. MNM retained the belt after pinning Mysterio for the win. The following week, Theodore Long booked a Street Fight between Mysterio and Guerrero's nephew, Chavo Guerrero Jr. Mysterio came out as the winner of the match. After the match (which Mysterio won), Chavo, Mercury, and Nitro attacked Mysterio, which prompted Guerrero to come out and clear the ring. Guerrero, however, attacked Mysterio. The assault led to Guerrero lifting Mysterio off the ground and driving Mysterio's back on the ring steps. This angle saw Guerrero turn into a villain. As a result, the following week, Long promoted a match between Guerrero and Mysterio at Judgment Day.

The other featured preliminary match was Kurt Angle versus Booker T in a singles match. On the April 28 episode of SmackDown!, Angle, Booker T, Big Show and JBL took part in a fatal four-way match to determine the number one contender for the WWE Championship, which JBL won. During the match, Angle hit Booker T with a steel chair to eliminate him. Booker T came back and hit Angle with a chair to cause him to be eliminated. The following week, Angle challenged Booker T to a match at Judgment Day, which Booker accepted. Prior to that, Angle had insulted Booker T's wife, Sharmell, which led to Booker T attacking and accepting Angle's challenge. On the May 12 episode of SmackDown!, Angle admitted he would like to have "perverted sex" with Sharmell. That same night, Angle and Booker T were scheduled in a match, which led to Angle leaving the ring and going backstage to Sharmell. Booker T went backstage and found Sharmell on the floor crying. This led to Angle attacking Booker T from behind and pushing him towards a pair of steel lockers. The following week, Long suspended Angle and demanded that Angle apologize for his actions. Angle apologized, but admitted that he actually kissed Sharmell and let her fondle his "private parts" before Booker T made his way to the locker room. Booker T, while watching the interview kicked a television monitor down and broke it.

== Event ==
Other on-screen personnel
Role:	Name:
English commentators	Michael Cole
English commentators	Tazz
Spanish commentators	Carlos Cabrera
Spanish commentators	Hugo Savinovich
Interviewer	Josh Mathews
Ring announcer	Tony Chimel
Referees	Charles Robinson
Referees	Nick Patrick
Referees	Jim Korderas
Referees	Brian Hebner

Before the Judgment Day event aired live on pay-per-view, Nunzio defeated Akio in a match that aired on Sunday Night Heat.

=== Preliminary matches ===
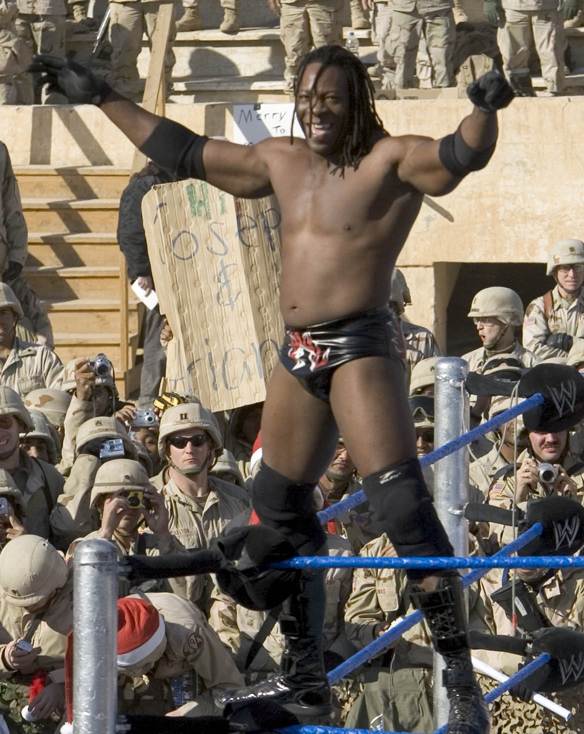
Booker T, who faced Kurt Angle

After Sunday Night Heat, the pay-per-view began with a tag team match where MNM (Joey Mercury and Johnny Nitro) (with Melina) defended the WWE Tag Team Championship against the team of Hardcore Holly and Charlie Haas. The match started off with Nitro and Haas in the ring. Haas took the advantage in the match and was able to tag in Holly. There was back and forth action between the two teams, as all of the superstars were able to participate in the match. After a Snapshot to Haas, Mercury pinned Haas, which resulted in MNM retaining the tag team titles.

The second wrestling match on the pay-per-view was Big Show versus Carlito, who was accompanied by Matt Morgan. For the duration of the match, Big Show used his body size to his advantage as he squashed, or easily and quickly performed moves on Carlito. The momentum changed, when Carlito gained control part way through the match. In the end, Big Show accidentally whipped Carlito into the referee. This saw Carlito hit a low blow on Big Show. Carlito won the match and gained the successful pinfall after Morgan delivered an F-5 to Big Show.

The next match was a standard match for the WWE Cruiserweight Championship, in which Paul London defended the title against Chavo Guerrero. After back and forth action between the two, London was able to perform a 450° splash. London then pinned Guerrero to retain the WWE Cruiserweight title.

The final preliminary match was Kurt Angle versus Booker T. After Booker T backed Angle into the ring ropes and executed a shoulder charge, Angle began to bleed from the mouth. The match saw exchange offense from both Angle and Booker T. The match came to an end when Angle attempted an Angle Slam, but Booker T grabbed Angle's leg and rolled him into a pinfall victory.

=== Main event matches ===
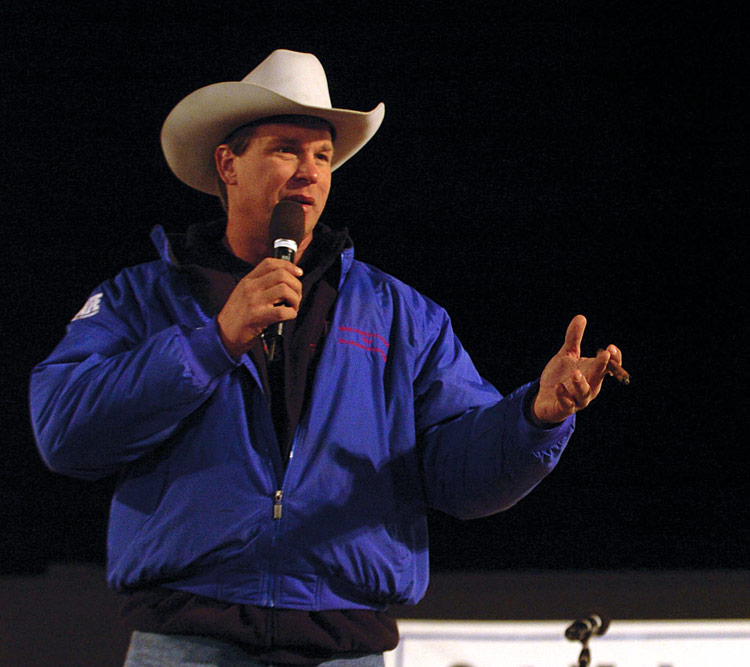
John "Bradshaw" Layfield (JBL) faced John Cena for the WWE Championship

The first featured match was for the WWE United States Championship, where Orlando Jordan defended the title against Heidenreich. As the match began, Jordan was able to perform a dropkick, sending Heidenreich through the ropes to the outside. Heidenreich, however, would gain the advantage after countering Jordan's attack from the top rope into a suplex. Afterwards, Jordan delivered a DDT and pinned Heidenreich to retain the United States title.

The next match was Eddie Guerrero versus Rey Mysterio in a standard match. In the match, Mysterio tried to counter Guerrero's offense, but Guerrero blocked all of Mysterio's attempts. Mysterio gained the advantage when he was able to execute a flying headbutt to Guerrero. Chavo ran down to the ring to distract the referee, as Eddie grabbed a chair. Guerrero then attempted to hit Mysterio with the chair, but Mysterio dodged it with a low dropkick and performed another low dropkick, setting up Guerrero on the ropes for a 619. Mysterio won after Guerrero was disqualified for attacking him with a steel chair.

The main event was the "I Quit" match for the WWE Championship, in which John Cena defended his title against John "Bradshaw" Layfield (JBL). Cena came out on the flatbed of a semi truck with a DJ on a turntable mixing his theme song. During the match, both Cena and JBL were able to get in offense. Cena performed a Back Body Drop through an announce table on JBL. Shortly after, JBL struck Cena with a steel chair which caused Cena to bleed from his forehead. JBL performed a Clothesline from Hell on Cena, who later performed an FU on JBL. Later in the match, in the ramp area, Cena threw JBL through a television monitor, causing JBL to bleed. JBL quit as Cena prepared to attacked him with an exhaust pipe, which was from the semi truck, meaning Cena retained the WWE Championship. After the match, Cena struck JBL with the exhaust pipe, causing him to fall through a glass panel that was part of the entrance stage.

== Reception ==
The Target Center had a maximum capacity of 20,000, which was reduced for the event. This event grossed over $500,000 from an approximate attendance of 9,500, the maximum allowed. It also received 220,000 pay-per-view buys. Judgment Day helped WWE earn $21.6 million in revenue from pay-per-view events versus $16.9 million the previous year, which was later confirmed by Linda McMahon on September 7, 2005 in a quarterly result. Canadian Online Explorer's professional wrestling section rated the event a 5 out of 10 stars. The rating was lower than the Judgment Day event in 2006, which was said to be an entertaining pay-per-view to watch. The "I Quit" match between John Cena and JBL was rated an eight out of 10 stars. Additionally, the match between Orlando Jordan and Heidenreich was rated a 4 out of 10 stars.

The event was released on DVD on June 21, 2005, by Sony Music Entertainment.

== Aftermath ==
On the June 6 episode of Raw, John Cena's SmackDown! tenure came to an end when he became the first wrestler selected by Raw general manager Eric Bischoff in the 2005 WWE Draft Lottery. Cena immediately entered a feud with Eric Bischoff after when he refused to participate in Bischoff's "war" against the upcoming Extreme Championship Wrestling (ECW) reunion show. Cena went on to resume his feud with Christian, as they had an encounter at the Royal Rumble in January. During the feud, Chris Jericho was involved as well, as he protested Bischoff's actions of scheduling a WWE Championship match between Cena and Christian at Vengeance. After Cena and Jericho defeated Christian and Tyson Tomko in a tag team match, Jericho betrayed Cena. Convinced with the outcome of the events, Bischoff changed the original match between Christian and Cena to a triple threat match, involving Jericho for the WWE Championship at Vengeance. At Vengeance, Cena retained the WWE Championship against Christian and Jericho.

On the June 30 episode of SmackDown!, a match between six wrestlers for a new top-tier SmackDown! championship was held, featuring John "Bradshaw" Layfield (JBL), Christian, Booker T, Chris Benoit, The Undertaker and Muhammad Hassan. JBL was victorious in the match, but Theodore Long announced that he was still not the champion. Instead he had won the right to a match against the World Heavyweight champion, Batista, who was SmackDown!'s final 2005 draft pick, making the World Heavyweight Championship exclusive to SmackDown!. The following week, it was announced Batista would meet JBL at The Great American Bash with the World Heavyweight championship on the line. At the Great American Bash, Batista was disqualified for attacking JBL with a chair and JBL was declared the winner. In WWE, a title cannot be won by disqualification, but only by pinfall or submission. As a result, Batista retained the title.

On the June 13 episode of Raw, Kurt Angle's tenure with SmackDown! came to an end, as he was also drafted to the Raw brand.

The angle between Eddie Guerrero and Rey Mysterio continued. On the June 30 episode of SmackDown!, Guerrero threatened to reveal a secret concerning Mysterio's son Dominik. This led the families of both Guerrero and Mysterio pleading with Guerrero not to reveal the secret. At the Great American Bash, Mysterio defeated Guerrero in a match where if Guerrero lost, he could not reveal the secret. On the July 28 episode of SmackDown!, Guerrero, however, revealed the secret, claiming he was Dominick's scripted biological father. The storyline also went on that Guerrero knew Mysterio was having trouble starting his own family, so Guerrero left Dominik to be raised by Mysterio's family. In subsequent weeks, Guerrero threatened to take custody of Dominik, drawing up custody papers and having his lawyer present them to Mysterio. This led to a Ladder match, a match where the objective was to climb a ladder and reach an object hanging above the ring, between the two for the custody of Dominik at SummerSlam, which Mysterio won.

== Results ==
No.	Results	Stipulations	Times
1^{H}	Nunzio defeated Akio by pinfall	Singles match	3:29
2	MNM (Joey Mercury and Johnny Nitro) (c) (with Melina) defeated Charlie Haas and Hardcore Holly by pinfall	Tag team match for the WWE Tag Team Championship	8:06
3	Carlito (with Matt Morgan) defeated Big Show by pinfall	Singles match	4:41
4	Paul London (c) defeated Chavo Guerrero by pinfall	Singles match for the WWE Cruiserweight Championship	10:41
5	Booker T defeated Kurt Angle by pinfall	Singles match	14:10
6	Orlando Jordan (c) defeated Heidenreich by pinfall	Singles match for the WWE United States Championship	4:54
7	Rey Mysterio defeated Eddie Guerrero by disqualification	Singles match	18:04
8	John Cena (c) defeated John "Bradshaw" Layfield	"I Quit" match for the WWE Championship	22:46
(c) / – the champion(s) heading into the match; H / – the match was broadcast prior to the pay-per-view on Sunday Night Heat

=== WWE Championship #1 Contender's Tournament bracket ===
1st Round; SmackDown; April 5–18, 2005 (Aired: April 7–21)
John "Bradshaw" Layfield	Disqualification
Rey Mysterio	15:20
Kurt Angle	Pinfall
Eddie Guerrero	25:40
Booker T	No Contest (5:20)
Big Show	No Contest (5:20)

Final; SmackDown; April 26, 2005 (Aired: April 28)
John "Bradshaw" Layfield	Pinfall
Kurt Angle	14:23
Booker T	—
Big Show	—
