= Orlando Jordan =

American professional wrestler (born 1974)

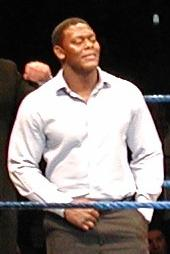
- Jordan in 2005

Personal information
- Born: Orlando Mason Jordan; April 21, 1974 (age 52) Salem, New Jersey, U.S.
- Children: 1

Professional wrestling career
- Ring name: Orlando Jordan
- Billed height: 6 ft 4 in (193 cm)
- Billed weight: 257 lb (117 kg)
- Billed from: Miami, Florida
- Trained by: Rocky Johnson; Corporal Punishment
- Debut: 1999
- Retired: 2024

Orlando Mason Jordan (born April 21, 1974) is an American semi-retired professional wrestler. He is best known for his tenures in WWE from 2001 to 2006 and Total Nonstop Action Wrestling (TNA) from 2010 to 2011.

Jordan made his wrestling debut in 1999 and began competing for Maryland Championship Wrestling (MCW) the following year, where he won the MCW Heavyweight Championship. He began appearing for WWE in 2001 and was assigned to their developmental territory, Ohio Valley Wrestling (OVW). Jordan made his main roster debut for the SmackDown brand in June 2003, where he aligned himself with John "Bradshaw" Layfield's (JBL) faction, The Cabinet, and won the WWE United States Championship once, before he was released in May 2006. He then worked for a number of promotions including World Wrestling Council (WWC), New Japan Pro-Wrestling (NJPW), and Nu-Wrestling Evolution (NWE). From January 2010 to June 2011, Jordan competed for TNA, where he formed a tag team with Eric Young.

In May 2011, Jordan became the co-owner of WildKat Sports & Entertainment, a professional wrestling school located outside New Orleans, alongside independent wrestler Luke Hawx. He opened another school in August 2012. Outside of wrestling, he works as a stunt performer, serving as a stunt double for Brian Tyree Henry in the 2024 film Godzilla x Kong: The New Empire.

== Early life ==
Jordan was born in Salem, New Jersey, on April 21, 1974, the youngest of eleven children in a family of Barbadian descent from the West Indies. His family grew up in Brooklyn, New York, but frequently relocated due to poverty, before settling in Richmond, Virginia. As a child, he was misdiagnosed with autism and had speech difficulties, attending classes to help him overcome them. Jordan attended Hermitage High School, where he played football and participated in amateur wrestling, before moving to Boise, Idaho, to wrestle for Boise State University.

Before becoming a professional wrestler, Jordan worked as a firefighter with the United States Forest Service. He then relocated to Florida, where he became a reputable amateur boxer.

== Professional wrestling career ==
=== Maryland Championship Wrestling (1999–2002) ===
Jordan made the decision to pursue a professional wrestling career at the age of six, training under Corporal Punishment in Maryland. After further training with Rocky Johnson, Jordan made his debut in 1999. In May 2000, he began wrestling for Maryland Championship Wrestling (MCW), where he regularly teamed with Marcus Jordan. On February 9, 2002, Jordan defeated The Bruiser to win the MCW Heavyweight Championship, which he held for a week until dropping it back to The Bruiser.

=== World Wrestling Federation/Entertainment (2001–2006) ===
==== Early years (2001–2004) ====
Jordan made his debut for the World Wrestling Federation (WWF) on December 21, 2001, where he defeated Billy Fives in a dark match on WWF Jakked. He continued to wrestle for the WWF (which changed its name to WWE in May 2002) in dark matches and house shows, as well as for their developmental territory, Ohio Valley Wrestling (OVW). Jordan made his WWE television debut on the May 31, 2003, episode of Velocity, defeating Jamie Noble.

On June 26, Jordan made his SmackDown! debut as a face, where he answered John Cena's open challenge, but lost the match. After the match, Jordan was attacked by Cena, before being saved by The Undertaker. At Vengeance on July 27, he participated in the APA's Invitational Bar Room Brawl. Jordan earned a countout victory over Big Show on the October 2 episode of SmackDown!, when Big Show ran to the restroom during the match after eating a burrito laced with laxatives. Jordan next answered WWE Champion Brock Lesnar's non-title open challenge on the January 29, 2004, episode of SmackDown!, but was quickly defeated.

==== The Cabinet and United States Champion (2004–2005) ====
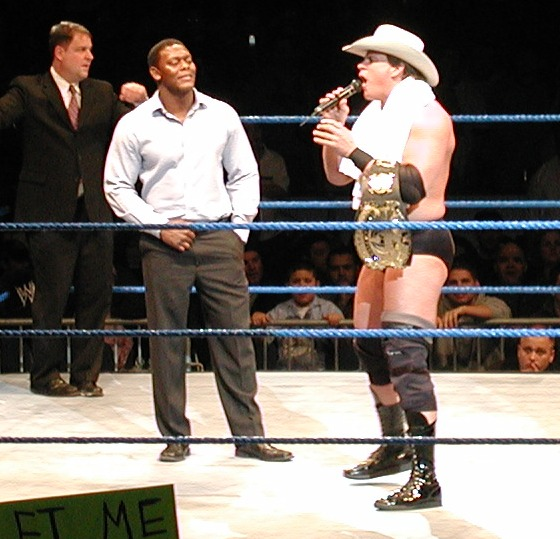
Jordan as "Chief of Staff" of John "Bradshaw" Layfield's (right) Cabinet in January 2005

After months of absence due to family issues, Jordan returned on the August 5 episode of SmackDown!, defeating René Duprée. Later that night, Jordan saved WWE Champion John "Bradshaw" Layfield (JBL) from an attack by The Undertaker, turning heel. The following week on SmackDown!, Jordan joined JBL's Cabinet and was appointed "Chief of Staff". He faced The Undertaker later that night, losing by disqualification after JBL attacked The Undertaker. On August 26, Jordan defended JBL's WWE Championship against The Undertaker, but the match ended in a disqualification after JBL again interfered. On the November 25 episode of SmackDown!, Jordan and JBL won a tag team match against Eddie Guerrero and Booker T, after interference from the Basham Brothers, who became the Cabinet's "co-secretaries of defense".

On the March 3, 2005, episode of SmackDown!, Jordan, with the help of JBL, defeated John Cena to win the United States Championship, his first and only title in WWE. He made his first successful title defense against Heidenreich on May 22 at Judgment Day. At The Great American Bash on July 24, Jordan defeated Chris Benoit to retain the title. However, at SummerSlam on August 21, Jordan lost the United States Championship to Benoit in 25 seconds, after submitting to the Crippler Crossface. Shortly after the loss, he broke away from the Cabinet, ending his alliance with JBL. Jordan failed to regain the United States Championship from Benoit in three consecutive matches on SmackDown!, each of which lasted under a minute. He was also unsuccessful in winning a fatal four-way match for the title, also involving Booker T and Christian, at No Mercy on October 9.

==== Various feuds and departure (2005–2006) ====
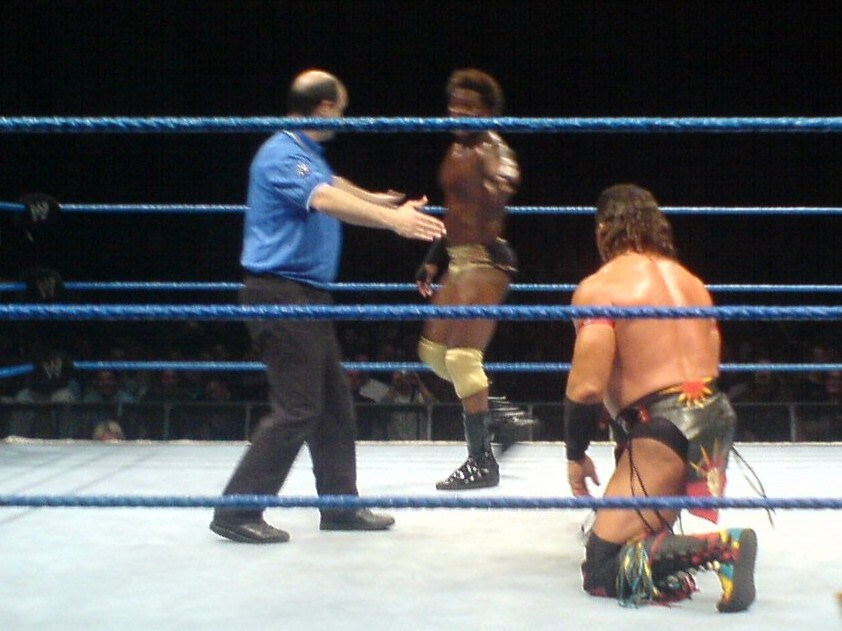
Jordan facing Tatanka in April 2006

When Booker T got injured halfway through his Best of Seven series for the United States Championship, being 3–1 in his favor, he needed a replacement to face Benoit and win so he could become champion. On the December 30 episode of SmackDown!, Jordan approached him about the position, but Booker T declined. Booker T asked Randy Orton to substitute for him, but he lost, leading Jordan to once again ask for the position on the following episode, which Booker T again declined. During the sixth match in the series, Jordan grabbed Booker T's crutch and hit Benoit, giving him a disqualification victory and tying the series at 3–3. On the January 13 episode of SmackDown!, Jordan unsuccessfully prevented Orton from defeating Benoit to win the series for Booker T.

The following week on SmackDown!, Jordan lost to Orton after Sharmell distracted referee Nick Patrick. After the match, Jordan was attacked by Booker T and Orton, before Benoit saved him, turning face. Jordan was also eliminated by Orton in the Royal Rumble match at the titular event on January 29. He made his final SmackDown! appearance in a backstage segment on May 12, telling Nunzio that he had seen someone who looked like his partner, Vito, dressed in drag at a night club during the recent UK tour. During this time, Jordan had been planned to portray a bisexual character on television, but these plans never came to fruition, as he was released from WWE on May 26, 2006.

=== Independent circuit and international promotions (2006–2010) ===
On June 23, 2006, Jordan made his first post-WWE appearance for the Puerto Rico-based World Wrestling Council (WWC), teaming with Black Pain in a disqualification loss to Eddie Colón and Shane.

During this time, he began wrestling on the European independent circuit, including for the Italy-based promotion Nu-Wrestling Evolution (NWE), where on April 29, 2008, he defeated Romeo Roselli to capture the NWE World Heavyweight Championship. On June 25, Jordan lost the championship in Barcelona to the Ultimate Warrior, who had returned to wrestling after a ten-year absence; he was also Warrior's last opponent.

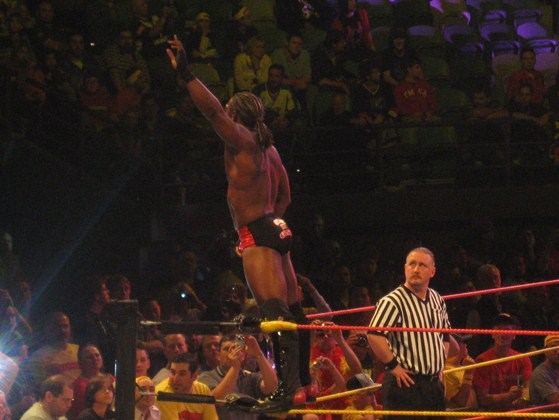
Jordan during the Hulkamania: Let The Battle Begin tour of Australia in November 2009

In November 2009, Jordan took part in the Hulkamania: Let The Battle Begin tour in Australia. On November 21, Jordan and Uso Fatu lost to Brian Christopher and Rikishi in a tag team match. After defeating Ken Kennedy on November 24, Jordan teamed with Fatu against Kennedy and Brutus Beefcake two days later in a losing effort. On November 28, in his final match of the tour, Jordan lost to Beefcake in a singles match.

=== New Japan Pro-Wrestling (2007) ===
Jordan made his debut for New Japan Pro-Wrestling (NJPW) on April 7, 2007, during the "NJPW 35th Anniversary Tour", teaming with Giant Bernard in a disqualification loss to Hiroshi Tanahashi and Takashi Iizuka. He wrestled as part of the faction Black New Japan, led by Masahiro Chono. His last appearance for NJPW took place on July 13, where he lost to Tanahashi in singles competition.

=== Total Nonstop Action Wrestling (2010–2011) ===
On the January 4, 2010, live, three-hour Monday night edition of Impact!, Jordan, as a heel, made his Total Nonstop Action Wrestling (TNA) debut in a backstage segment with The Pope. He defeated The Pope on the January 21 edition of Impact! and scored an upset victory over Samoa Joe on February 18. On the March 29 edition of Impact!, Jordan, sporting a new look, debuted his bisexual character which included the usage of caution tape in his ring attire. On April 9, he signed a new multi-year contract with TNA. On the May 3 edition of Impact!, Jordan debuted his new interview segment, O-Zone, during which he attacked and started a feud with Global Champion Rob Terry, unsuccessfully challenging him for the title at Sacrifice on May 16. The following week on Impact!, Jordan defeated Terry in a non-title match after capitalizing on Terry's injured knee, which he had injured at Sacrifice. On the June 3 edition of Impact!, Jordan and Desmond Wolfe lost to Terry and Abyss, with Terry pinning Jordan to end their feud.

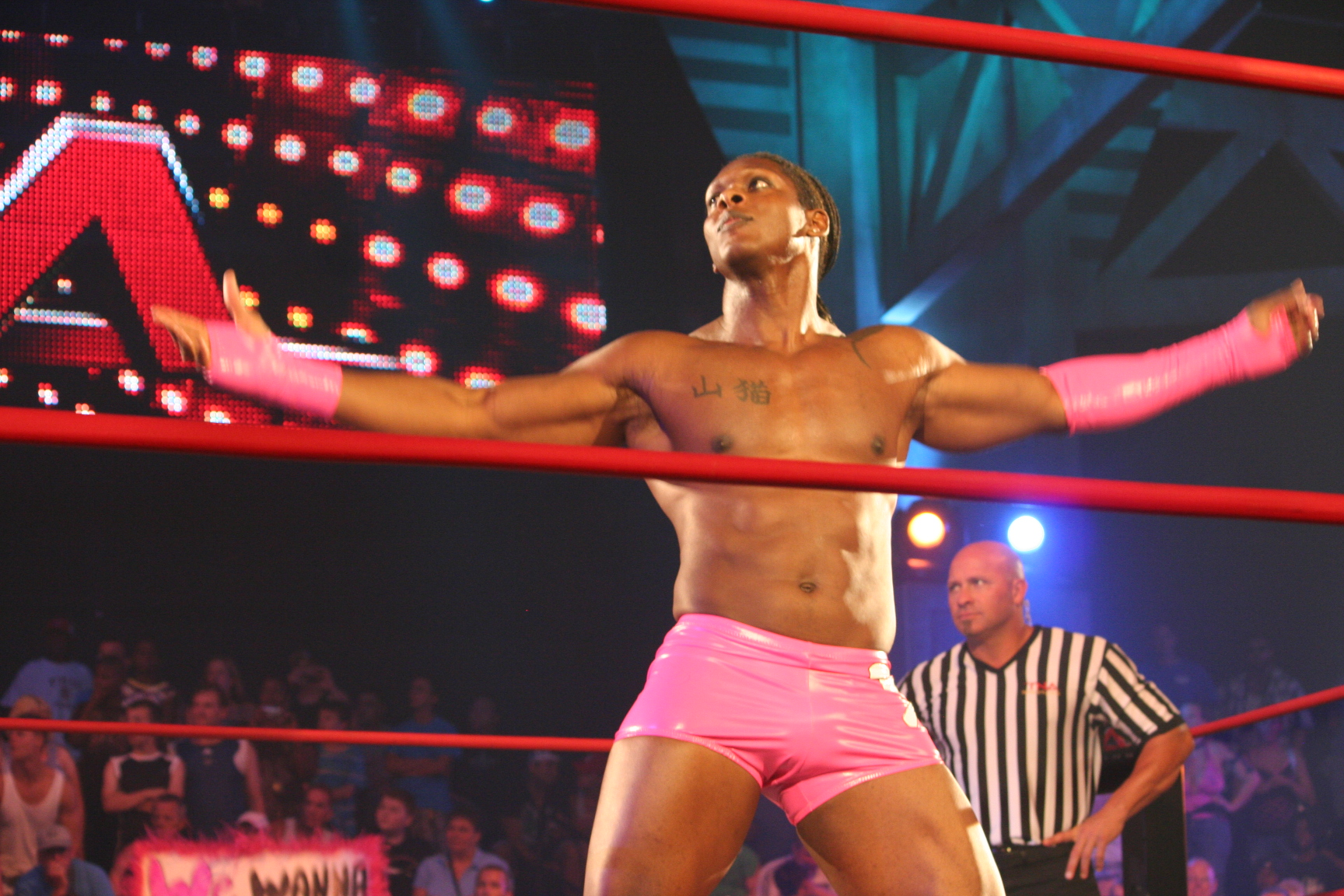
Jordan in July 2010

On the July 29 edition of Impact!, the heel Jordan formed a dysfunctional tag team with face Eric Young, who had been battling (kayfabe) mental problems ever since taking a bump on the head, being completely unaware of Jordan's sexual orientation and interest in him. Jordan and Young lost to Ink Inc. (Jesse Neal and Shannon Moore) on October 10 at Bound for Glory. Jordan turned face upon the team's appearance on Impact! on December 16, as he and Young defeated Generation Me (Jeremy and Max Buck). On April 17, 2011, at Lockdown, Jordan and Young failed to become the number one contenders to the TNA World Tag Team Championship in a four tag team steel cage match. In June, Jordan faced Magnus in the first round of the Xplosion Championship Challenge, but lost. On July 11, Jordan was released from TNA.

=== Return to the independent circuit (2011–2024) ===
At an NWA WildKat event on November 4, 2011, Jordan lost to Steve Anthony in a lumberjack match. On February 25, 2012, he defeated David Hawk to win the High Risk Pro Wrestling (HRPW) World Heavyweight Championship, but vacated it on March 23 due to injury. He made his debut for Australian Wrestling Entertainment (AWE) on September 19, 2014, in a loss to Shelton Benjamin.

Jordan did not wrestle again until May 6, 2016, when he won the Innerwest Rumble for an opportunity at the AWE Heavyweight Championship. On June 3, Jordan defeated Luke Knight to win the title, only to lose it back to Knight on July 22. On February 24, 2018, he defeated Jack Rossely to win the Adelaide Championship Wrestling (ACW) Heavyweight Championship, which he eventually lost to Adam Brooks on October 20.

On September 16, 2023, Jordan defeated Wes Williams for the All-Star Wrestling Australia (ASWA) World Heavyweight Championship. After five successful title defenses, he lost it on April 13, 2024, to Keegan Brettle.

== Personal life ==
Since May 2011, Jordan, alongside independent wrestler Luke Hawx, has been the co-owner of WildKat Sports & Entertainment, a professional wrestling school located outside New Orleans. On August 20, 2012, Jordan opened another wrestling school in Melbourne, Australia, where he currently resides and works as a stunt performer.

Jordan is bisexual, making him the first openly bisexual male wrestler in WWE and TNA. On October 10, 2013, he married a woman in Australia. The following year, his daughter Dakota was born.

== Other media ==
Jordan appeared as a playable character in the video games WWE SmackDown vs. Raw 2006 and WWE Day of Reckoning 2. He served as a stunt double for Brian Tyree Henry in the 2024 film Godzilla x Kong: The New Empire.

== Championships and accomplishments ==
=== Amateur wrestling ===
- All–American Wrestling Champion (2 times)
- Central Region (Richmond) Wrestling Champion (3 times)
- National Wrestling Champion (2 times)
- Virginia Commonwealth Games Freestyle Wrestling Champion (1 time)
- Virginia State Wrestling Champion (AAA) (1 time)

=== Professional wrestling ===
- Adelaide Championship Wrestling
  - ACW Heavyweight Championship (1 time)
- All Action Wrestling
  - AAW World Heavyweight Championship (1 time)
- All-Star Wrestling Australia
  - ASWA Heavyweight Championship (1 time)
- Australian Wrestling Entertainment
  - AWE Championship (1 time)
- High Risk Pro Wrestling
  - HRPW World Heavyweight Championship (1 time)
- Maryland Championship Wrestling
  - MCW Heavyweight Championship (1 time)
- Nu-Wrestling Evolution
  - NWE World Heavyweight Championship (1 time)
- Pro Wrestling Illustrated
  - Ranked No. 82 of the top 500 singles wrestlers in the PWI 500 in 2011
- World Wrestling Entertainment
  - WWE United States Championship (1 time)
- Wrestling Observer Newsletter
  - Worst Gimmick (2010)
