= SummerSlam (2005) =

World Wrestling Entertainment pay-per-view event

- Promotional poster featuring Hulk Hogan and Shawn Michaels
- Promotion: World Wrestling Entertainment
- Brand(s): Raw; SmackDown!
- Date: August 21, 2005
- City: Washington, D.C.
- Venue: MCI Center
- Attendance: 18,176
- Buy rate: 650,000
- Tagline: Hogan vs Michaels For the First Time Ever

Pay-per-view chronology
← Previous; The Great American Bash	Next → Unforgiven

SummerSlam chronology
← Previous; 2004	Next → 2006

The 2005 SummerSlam was a professional wrestling pay-per-view (PPV) event produced by World Wrestling Entertainment (WWE). It was the 18th annual SummerSlam and took place on August 21, 2005, at the MCI Center in Washington, D.C., held for wrestlers from the promotion's Raw and SmackDown! brand divisions. Nine matches were contested at the event, including one on the Sunday Night Heat pre-show.

The main match on the Raw brand was Hulk Hogan versus Shawn Michaels, which Hogan won by pinfall after executing a leg drop. The predominant match on the SmackDown! brand was a No Holds Barred match for the World Heavyweight Championship between Batista and John "Bradshaw" Layfield (JBL), which Batista won by pinfall after executing two Batista Bombs, with the second on the steel ring steps. Another primary match on the Raw brand was for the WWE Championship between John Cena and Chris Jericho, which Cena won by pinfall after performing an FU. The main match on the undercard was from SmackDown! and was a ladder match for the custody of Rey Mysterio's son Dominik between Mysterio and Eddie Guerrero, which Mysterio won by retrieving the briefcase suspended above the ring. The original match was supposed to see Batista defend the World Heavyweight Championship against Muhammad Hassan and have Hassan defeat Batista but was written off and fired a month earlier due to the July 7 2005 London Bombings in London England.

== Production ==
=== Background ===
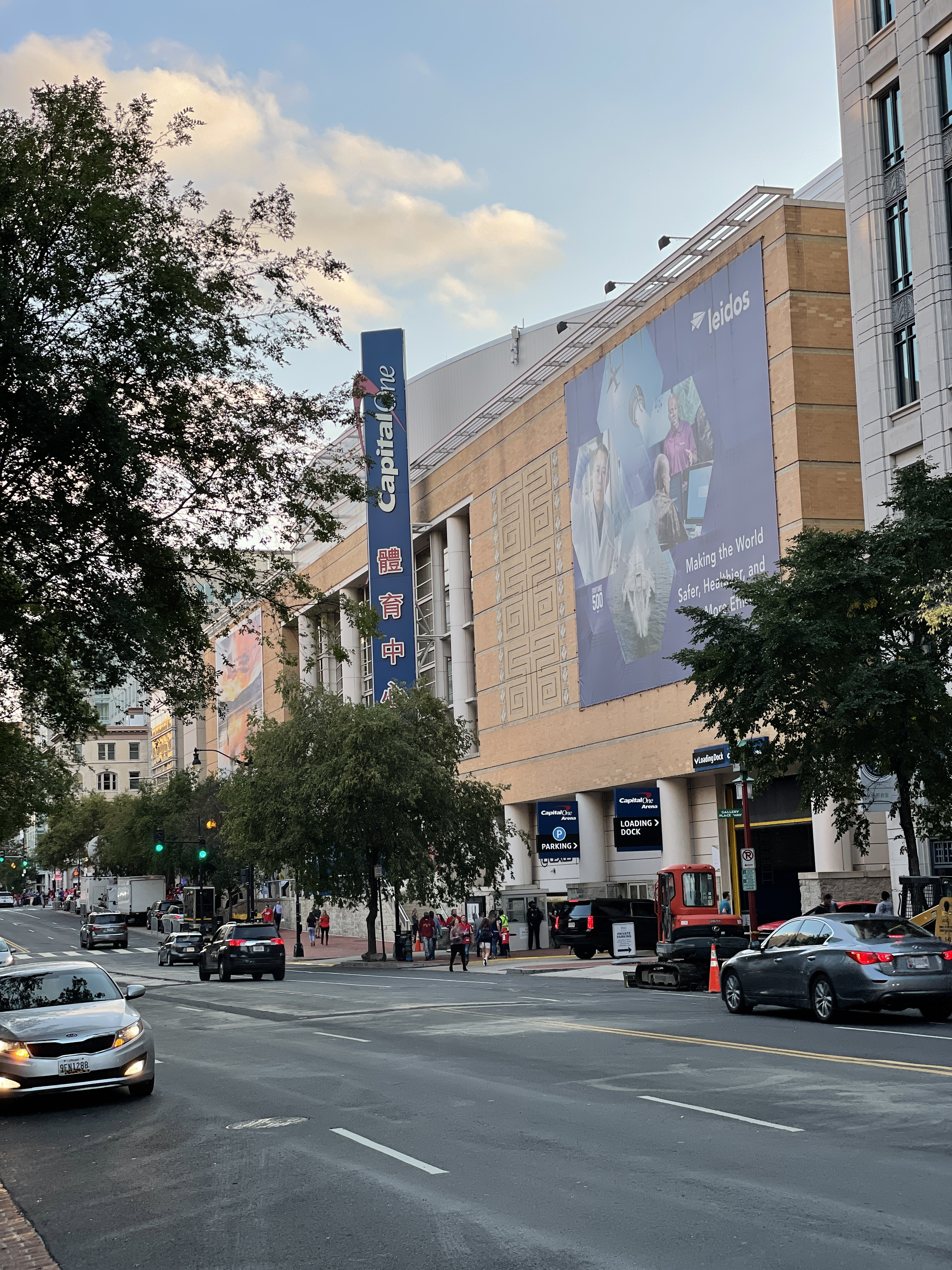
The 18th SummerSlam was held at the MCI Center in Washington, D.C.

SummerSlam is an annual professional wrestling pay-per-view (PPV) produced every August by World Wrestling Entertainment (WWE) since 1988. Dubbed "The Biggest Party of the Summer", it is one of the promotion's original four pay-per-views, along with WrestleMania, Royal Rumble, and Survivor Series, referred to as the "Big Four". It has since become considered WWE's second biggest event of the year behind WrestleMania. The 18th SummerSlam was scheduled to be held on August 21, 2005, at the MCI Center in Washington, D.C., and featured wrestlers from the Raw and SmackDown! brand divisions.

WWE had originally planned a match between Muhammad Hassan and Batista for SmackDown!'s World Heavyweight Championship, which would have made Hassan the youngest world champion in WWE history at 23, breaking Randy Orton's record. The storyline was scheduled to begin at The Great American Bash the prior month in which he faced The Undertaker in a number one contenders match, but it was scrapped in the aftermath of the London bombings that occurred three days after SmackDown! was taped.

=== Storylines ===
Eight professional wrestling matches were scheduled on the event's card, which were planned with predetermined outcomes by WWE's script writers. The storylines revolving around these matches before, during, and after the event were also planned by the script writers. The event featured wrestlers and other talent from both the Raw and SmackDown! brands – a storyline expansion to which WWE assigned its employees.

The main feud heading into SummerSlam on the Raw brand was between Hulk Hogan and Shawn Michaels. A feud between Michaels, Muhammad Hassan, and Daivari began on the April 4 episode of Raw, when Hassan and Daivari attacked Michaels. Michaels demanded a match against the two, but he would only be given one if he found a partner. Hogan eventually became Michaels' partner, and they defeated Hassan and Daivari at Backlash. Hogan did not appear again until the June 27 episode of Raw in a six-man tag match joining Michaels and John Cena against Chris Jericho, Christian, and Tyson Tomko, a match which Hogan's team won. His next appearance was on the July 4 episode of Raw on Carlito's talk show segment Carlito's Cabana. Carlito, along with Kurt Angle, made comments about Hogan's daughter Brooke and eventually attacked him. Michaels came out to help Hogan, and they defeated Carlito and Angle in a match later that night. The match saw Hogan and Michaels get the victory. During the post-match pose, Michaels superkicked Hogan, which knocked Hogan to the ground and turning Michaels heel for the first time since returning to the company in 2002. The following week, Michaels challenged Hogan to a match at SummerSlam, which Hogan accepted.

The predominant feud on the SmackDown! brand was between Batista and John "Bradshaw" Layfield (JBL), with the two feuding over the World Heavyweight Championship. During the WWE Draft Lottery, SmackDown! was left temporarily without a top championship after John Cena, the reigning WWE Champion, was drafted to Raw. On the June 30 edition of SmackDown!, a six-man elimination match between JBL, The Undertaker, Booker T, and SmackDown! draftees Chris Benoit, Christian, and Muhammad Hassan was made and General Manager Theodore Long was to present a new title to the winner called the SmackDown! Championship. JBL won the match by eliminating Christian last, but Long announced that plans had changed and there was no need for a SmackDown! Championship. Instead, Long revealed that Batista, who had been the reigning World Heavyweight Champion since defeating Triple H at WrestleMania 21, was joining the brand as the final draft pick and by winning the match, JBL was the number one contender for the World Heavyweight Championship. JBL faced Batista for the World Heavyweight Championship at The Great American Bash, where JBL won by disqualification when Batista used a steel chair. JBL was given a rematch at SummerSlam on the following episode of SmackDown! after defeating The Undertaker. Batista allowed JBL to choose the stipulation, and JBL made it a No Holds Barred match. On the August 11 episode of SmackDown!, during Batista's match with Christian, JBL interfered and hit Batista with a steel chair. The following week, JBL faced Funaki in a No Holds Barred match, during which Batista interfered and attacked JBL.

Another rivalry leading into the event was between John Cena and Chris Jericho, with the two battling over the WWE Championship. Their feud began when Cena was drafted to Raw during the draft lottery and began a feud with Raw General Manager Eric Bischoff. Cena refused to comply with Bischoff, who saw Cena as an unfit champion. After Cena successfully defended the WWE Championship in a triple threat match at Vengeance against Jericho and Christian, Bischoff hand-picked Jericho to face Cena for the WWE Championship at SummerSlam. On the August 1 episode of Raw, Jericho refereed a WWE Championship match between Cena and Carlito (which Cena won). After the match, Jericho attacked Cena with a television camera. On the August 15 episode of Raw, Cena defeated Jericho and Carlito in a handicap match. At the end, Jericho hit Cena with a steel chair.

Another rivalry heading into the event on the SmackDown! brand was between Eddie Guerrero and Rey Mysterio in a Ladder Match. Guerrero and Mysterio had been feuding for past three months ever since they lost the WWE Tag Team Championship to MNM in May when Guerrero walked out on Mysterio during the match. Guerrero frustrated over losing to Mysterio in a match at WrestleMania turned heel on Mysterio and vertical suplexed him on the ring steps. The two had a match at Judgment Day which ended in a disqualification when Guerrero repeatedly hit Mysterio with a steel chair. The rivalry resumed between the two when Guerrero promised to reveal a secret concerning Mysterio's son Dominik. Mysterio and Guerrero had another match at The Great American Bash in which if Guerrero lost he would not reveal the secret. Mysterio won the match at the event. On the July 28 episode of SmackDown!, Guerrero revealed to Mysterio that he lied and then told Dominik that Mysterio was not his father and that Guerrero himself was his real father. Over the following weeks, Guerrero reveal the details of his secret claiming that he had a child out of wedlock (Dominik) while his marriage was going through hard times and stated that he allowed Mysterio and his wife Angie who were "having trouble conceiving" to adopt the child as their own. Guerrero even had his lawyer served official custody papers to Mysterio demanding that he signed them to give Guerrero custody of Dominik. On the August 11th episode of SmackDown!, Guerrero and a social services representative came to the ring and demanded that Mysterio and Angie hand over Dominik to him. During the segment, Mysterio pointed out that Guerrero had beaten his drug addiction and his inner demons but he hasn't beaten Mysterio. Mysterio then challenged Guerrero to a match at SummerSlam for the custody of Dominik. After Guerrero accepted the challenge, the social worker told the two that their conflict has nothing to do with Dominik and until they can resolve their differences, Dominik must go into foster care. The following week, it was announced that the match would be a Ladder Match with the custody papers in a briefcase hanging above the ring.

== Event ==
=== Preliminary matches ===
Other on-screen personnel
Role:	Name:
English commentator	Jim Ross (Raw)
English commentator	Jerry Lawler (Raw)
English commentator	Jonathan Coachman (Raw)
English commentator	Michael Cole (SmackDown!)
English commentator	Tazz (SmackDown!)
Spanish commentators	Carlos Cabrera
Spanish commentators	Hugo Savinovich
Interviewer	Todd Grisham
Ring announcers	Lilian Garcia (also sung national anthem)
Ring announcers	Tony Chimel
General Managers	Eric Bischoff (Raw)
General Managers	Theodore Long (SmackDown!)
Referees	Mike Chioda (Raw)
Referees	Jack Doan (Raw)
Referees	Chad Patton (Raw)
Referees	Brian Hebner (SmackDown!)
Referees	Jim Korderas (SmackDown!)
Referees	Nick Patrick (SmackDown!)
Referees	Charles Robinson (SmackDown!)

Before the event officially began, Chris Masters defeated The Hurricane in a match taped for Sunday Night Heat.

In the first match, Orlando Jordan faced Chris Benoit for the United States Championship. The match started with both locked up in a collar-and-elbow. Benoit forced Jordan into the corner, and as the referee was trying to break them up, Jordan punched Benoit. Benoit then avoided a clothesline and performed a German suplex. Benoit applied the Crippler Crossface to force Jordan to submit to win the match and the title in 25.5 seconds.

In the second match, Edge faced Matt Hardy. Fueled by a storyline stemming from previous real-life tensions between the two former friends over Hardy's real-life girlfriend Lita having an affair with Edge, the fight started outside the ring, with Hardy gaining the early advantage. After repeated punches, Hardy applied a rear naked choke. Edge fought back with a headbutt and punches. Edge then performed a spear to the outside. Both were down briefly before Edge brought Hardy back into the ring. Hardy fought back with punches and mounted punches in the corner. During this, Edge pushed Hardy upwards, causing his head to hit the ringpost and bleed. Edge attacked Hardy's head repeatedly, and Hardy was incapable of defending himself. The referee finally stopped the match and awarded Edge the victory. This match, seen by many as a disappointment, was highly anticipated due to WWE's storyline exploiting real life events between Edge and Hardy.

The third match was a Ladder match between Eddie Guerrero and Rey Mysterio for the custody of Dominik. A briefcase with legal documents inside was suspended above the ring. After throwing Mysterio into the steel steps, Guerrero ascended a ladder. Mysterio performed a springboard dropkick to knock down the ladder. Mysterio then performed a dropkick, sending the ladder into Guerrero's face, and a springboard seated senton to the outside. Guerrero then performed a powerbomb off the ladder, and a Hilo to Mysterio, who was sandwiched between two ladders. Both ascended the ladder again, and Mysterio performed a back body drop onto another ladder. Guerrero performed an Alley Oop to Mysterio onto a ladder balanced on the top rope. As Guerrero ascended the ladder, Dominik entered the ring and attempted to shake the ladder. Guerrero confronted him and, as he was about to attack him, Mysterio fought off Guerrero and performed a 619 and a Droppin' Da Dime with the ladder. Both attempted to obtain the briefcase, but was stopped by the other. After Guerrero performed the Three Amigos onto a ladder, he ascended the ladder, but Vickie Guerrero came down and pushed down the ladder. She then held onto Eddie as Mysterio retrieved the briefcase to win the match.

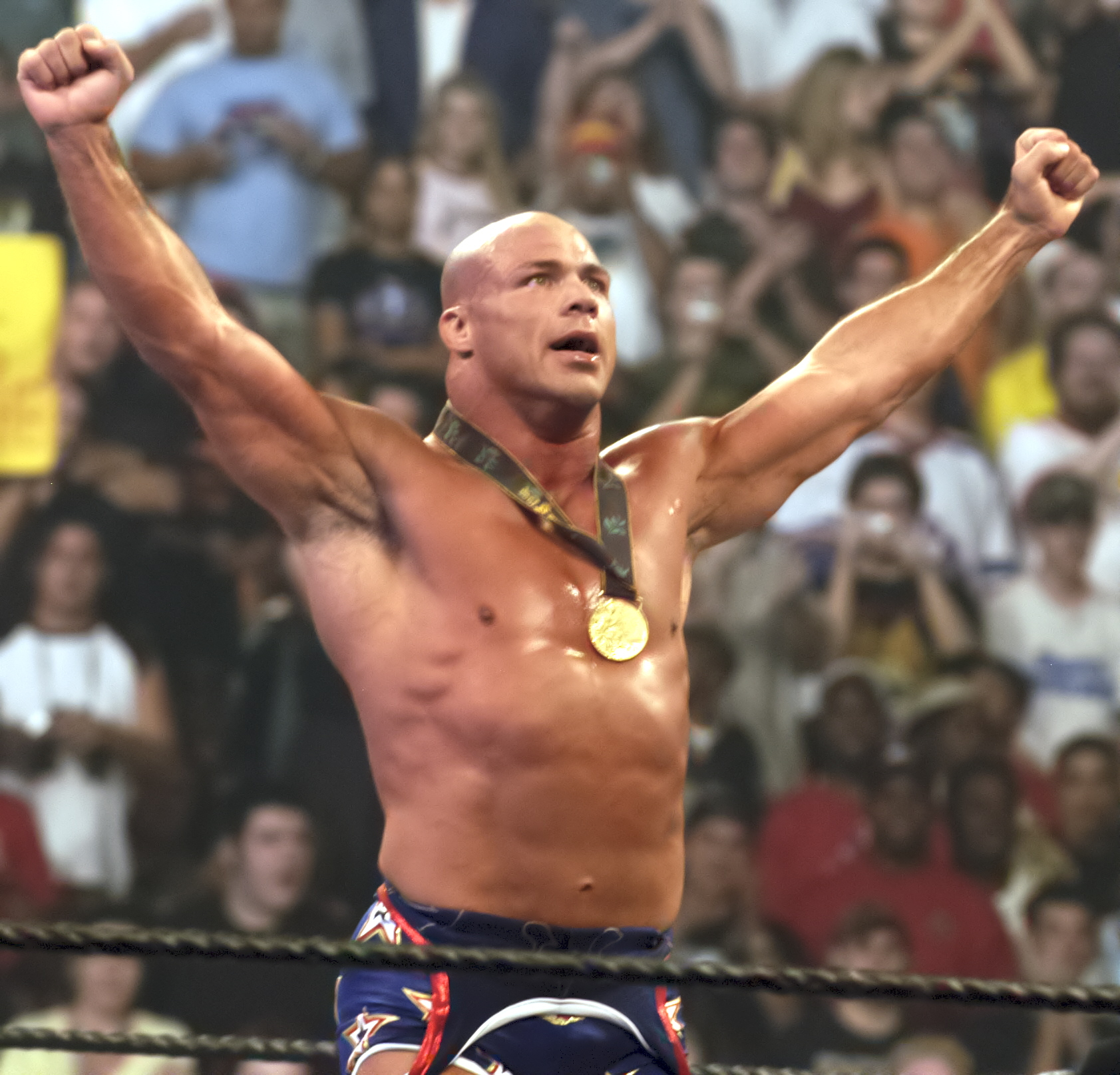
Kurt Angle, who regained his Olympic gold medal against Eugene

The fourth match was between Eugene and Kurt Angle for the Olympic gold medal that originally belonged to Angle. Angle gained the early advantage with repeated short-arm clotheslines. Eugene then countered with a spinebuster and attempted a People's Elbow, but Angle performed a clothesline. Angle then performed several German suplexes. Eugene fought back and performed a Rock Bottom. Eugene then performed a Stone Cold Stunner and applied the ankle lock. Angle countered and performed an Angle Slam. He then applied the ankle lock and forced Eugene to submit to win the match. After the match, Angle threw Eugene out of the ring and had the referee place the gold medal around his neck.

The fifth match was between The Undertaker and Randy Orton. The Undertaker gained the advantage after a leaping flying clothesline and attacks in the corner. Orton gained the advantage by avoiding a big boot. Orton then attacked The Undertaker's left knee. The Undertaker eventually countered an attack by sending Orton outside the ring. The Undertaker then performed a guillotine leg drop to Orton, who was on the apron. The Undertaker then performed an Old School and a reverse STO. The Undertaker then performed a Snake Eyes, but Orton came back with a dropkick. The Undertaker avoided an RKO attempt and attempted a Tombstone Piledriver, which Orton countered into an inverted headlock backbreaker. Orton then performed a crossbody, but The Undertaker rolled through and performed a chokeslam. A fan then entered the ring and distracted The Undertaker, allowing Orton to perform an RKO and win the match. Orton then revealed the fan to be "Cowboy" Bob Orton in disguise.

=== Main event matches ===
In the sixth match, John Cena faced Chris Jericho for the WWE Championship. Jericho gained the early advantage until missing a springboard crossbody to the outside. Cena fought back briefly, but Jericho fought back, dropkicking and superplexing Cena. Cena fought back with a back body drop, but missed a leaping shoulder block. Jericho then delivered a one-handed bulldog, but missed a lionsault. Jericho countered an FU attempt and attempted to apply the Walls of Jericho, but Cena kicked Jericho outside. Cena performed a diving leg drop bulldog and attempted an FU, but Jericho countered into a DDT. Jericho then performed a pendulum backbreaker and repeated elbow drops to Cena's back. Cena fought back and performed a spin-out powerbomb. He then attempted a Five Knuckle Shuffle, but Jericho countered and applied the Walls of Jericho. He then performed a belly to back suplex from the top rope. As he attempted another attack, Cena countered into an FU to win the match and retain his title.

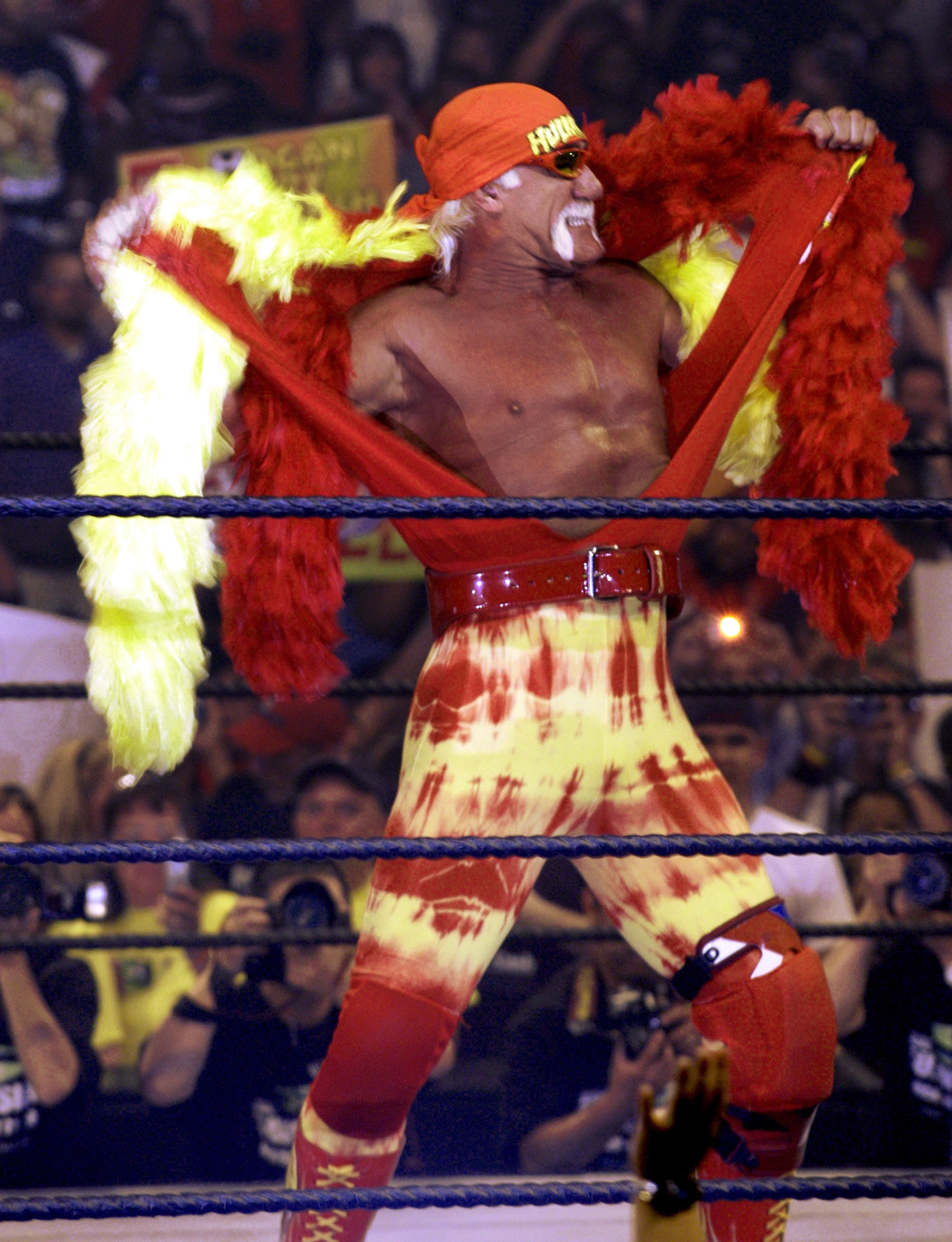
Hulk Hogan making his entrance at the event.

The seventh match was a No Holds Barred match between John "Bradshaw" Layfield (JBL) and Batista for the World Heavyweight Championship. JBL attacked Batista during his entrance, and they fought on the entrance ramp and at ringside, using several weapons. Batista performed a spear to JBL through the security wall. JBL shoved Batista into the ringpost and continued to beat down Batista after a short-arm clothesline. He then whipped and choked Batista with a leather belt. Batista fought back with a belly to back suplex and whipped JBL with the belt. JBL fought back, performing a Clothesline from Hell for a near-fall and bringing the steel steps into the ring. He attempted an attack on the steps, but Batista countered with a back body drop. He then performed a spinebuster and two Batista Bombs, with the second onto the steel steps, to win the match and retain his title.

The main event was between Shawn Michaels and Hulk Hogan. This was Hogan's first SummerSlam appearance since 1991. During Hogan's entrance, a huge American flag unrolled from the top of the stage and covered the entire set. The match started slowly, until Hogan sent Michaels outside. Hogan performed a scoop slam on the announce table and sent Michaels into the ringpost. Michaels reversed another attempt and sent Hogan into the ringpost twice. Michaels continued to attack his head with punches and mounted punches and applied the sleeper hold. Hogan fought out of it with a belly to back suplex, but failed to gain the advantage as Michaels performed a flying forearm smash. Michaels then missed a diving elbow drop, and Hogan fought back briefly. Michaels performed another flying forearm smash and applied the sharpshooter. Hogan broke the hold and avoided another attempt by kicking Michaels into the referee. Michaels performed a low blow and hit Hogan with a steel chair. Michaels then performed a diving elbow drop and a superkick. Michaels attempted a pinfall but Hogan kicked out at a two count. Hogan then delivered a big boot and a leg drop to win the match. After the match, Michaels extended his hand to Hogan saying, "I needed to know and I found out", and Hogan shook his hand.

== Aftermath ==
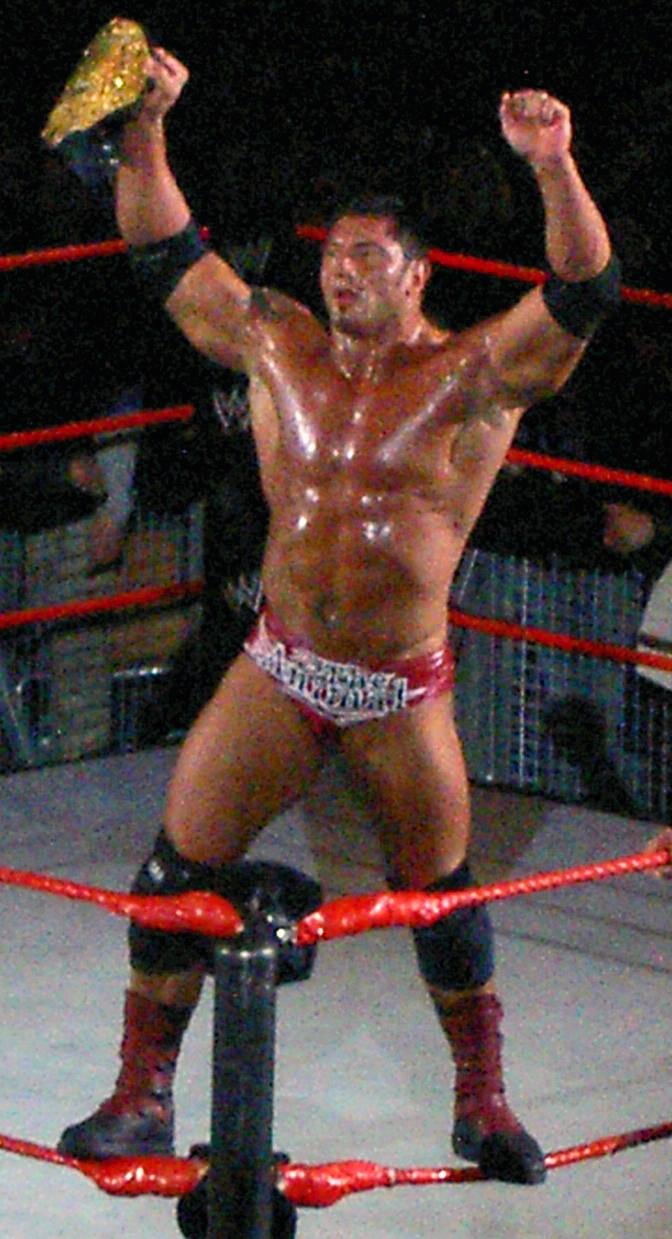
Batista retained SmackDown!'s World Heavyweight Championship at SummerSlam

The following night on Raw, Eric Bischoff made a You're Fired match between John Cena and Chris Jericho for the WWE Championship. Although Bischoff interfered, Cena won the match, and Jericho was fired. Immediately after the match, Kurt Angle attacked Cena and was revealed to be Bischoff's new hand-picked representative to win the title from Cena. Angle and Cena feuded until the start of 2006, with Angle unable to win the title, and Bischoff being fired.

The feud between Batista and John "Bradshaw" Layfield (JBL) ended when Batista defeated JBL in a Texas Bullrope match on the September 9 episode of SmackDown!. Batista then began a storyline with Eddie Guerrero when Guerrero was given a title match at No Mercy, and the two became friends. This storyline ended prematurely due to Guerrero's unexpected death on November 13.

The feud between Matt Hardy and Edge continued with a Street Fight on the August 29 episode of Raw (which ended in a no contest) and a Steel Cage match at Unforgiven (which Hardy won), and it ended with Hardy losing a Loser Leaves Raw Ladder match on the October 3 episode of Raw. The feud between The Undertaker and Randy Orton continued with a Handicap Casket match at No Mercy, where The Undertaker lost to Randy and "Cowboy" Bob Orton. After the match, Randy and Bob poured gasoline on the casket and set it ablaze. The Undertaker had vanished from the casket, and their feud briefly went on hiatus until Survivor Series. Shawn Michaels started a feud with Chris Masters when Masters interrupted Michaels, wanting to take the spotlight. The feud between Chris Benoit and Orlando Jordan continued with Jordan losing in rematches, lasting less than a minute each.

The feud between Eddie Guerrero and Rey Mysterio ended when Guerrero defeated Mysterio in a steel cage match on the September 9 episode of SmackDown!. Afterwards, Guerrero became the number one contender to Batista's World Heavyweight Championship while Mysterio resumed his singles career. On October 9 at No Mercy, Guerrero was unsuccessful in winning the World Heavyweight Championship. After the event, Guerrero slowly turned face as he formed a friendship with Batista. Guerrero later died of heart failure on November 13, 2005.

In mid-2006, WWE launched a third brand dubbed ECW, which featured wrestlers from the former Extreme Championship Wrestling (ECW) promotion, as well as newer talent. Additionally, the ECW World Heavyweight Championship was reactivated to be the brand's top championship, and third concurrently active world title in WWE.

== Results ==
No.	Results	Stipulations	Times
1^{H}	Chris Masters defeated The Hurricane (with Rosey and Super Stacy)	Singles match	1:56
2	Chris Benoit defeated Orlando Jordan (c)	Singles match for the WWE United States Championship	0:25
3	Edge (with Lita) defeated Matt Hardy by technical knockout	Singles match	4:50
4	Rey Mysterio defeated Eddie Guerrero	Ladder match for custody of Dominik	20:19
5	Kurt Angle defeated Eugene (with Christy Hemme)	Singles match for Kurt Angle's Olympic medal	4:33
6	Randy Orton defeated The Undertaker	Singles match	17:17
7	John Cena (c) defeated Chris Jericho	Singles match for the WWE Championship	14:49
8	Batista (c) defeated John "Bradshaw" Layfield	No Holds Barred match for the World Heavyweight Championship	9:07
9	Hulk Hogan defeated Shawn Michaels	Singles match	21:26
(c) / – the champion(s) heading into the match; H / – the match was broadcast prior to the pay-per-view on Sunday Night Heat
