= Muhammad Hassan (wrestler) =

American retired professional wrestler

Personal information
- Born: Marc Julian Copani; April 16, 1980 (age 46) Syracuse, New York, U.S.

Professional wrestling career
- Ring name(s): Mark Magnus; Muhammad Hassan
- Billed height: 6 ft 2 in (188 cm)
- Billed weight: 245 lb (111 kg)
- Billed from: Detroit, Michigan
- Trained by: Nick Dinsmore; Nightmare Danny Davis
- Debut: 2002
- Retired: 2018

Marc Julian Copani (born April 16, 1980) is an American retired professional wrestler and educator. He is best known for his appearances in World Wrestling Entertainment (WWE) from 2004 to 2005, where he portrayed an Arab American under the ring name Muhammad Hassan. His career came to an abrupt end when a controversial terrorist angle coincided with the London bombings of July 7, 2005, leading the television network UPN to pressure WWE to remove Copani's character from television. Following his departure from WWE, he stopped wrestling; instead, he started working as an educator. Copani returned to wrestling in 2018 at The Dynasty event King of Thrones.

== Early life ==
Copani was born in Syracuse, New York, to a family of Italian descent. He graduated from Cicero – North Syracuse High School in 1998. He enrolled in the State University of New York at Buffalo, studying for a degree in history. In 2002, he left college to pursue a career in professional wrestling.

== Professional wrestling career ==
=== Ohio Valley Wrestling (2002–2004) ===
Copani joined the Louisville, Kentucky-based promotion Ohio Valley Wrestling (OVW) in 2002. He debuted in the same year under the ring name Mark Magnus.

On August 13, 2003, Copani defeated Johnny Jeter to win the OVW Heavyweight Championship. The title was vacated on December 10, 2003, when Copani was pinned by both Jeter and Nick Dinsmore in a triple threat match.

In 2004, the promotion World Wrestling Entertainment (WWE) approached OVW seeking a wrestler to portray an Arab American character. Copani was offered the opportunity by OVW booker Jim Cornette.

=== World Wrestling Entertainment (2004–2005) ===
==== Raw debut (2004–2005) ====
Copani made his WWE television debut as a heel on Raw as Muhammad Hassan on December 13, 2004, in an in-ring segment with Mick Foley after wrestling dark matches and house shows for about two months. His introductory video and gimmick featured him and his manager, Iranian-American Khosrow Daivari, introducing themselves as Arab Americans. He described himself as a wrestler of Jordanian-Palestinian descent wanting relief from the increased prejudice and stereotypes created by the 9/11 attacks, as he entered professional wrestling. He then concluded with a controversial extension of hands and praise to Allah. He stopped praising Allah vocally due to complaints by Muslim-Americans, but still extended his hands during his ring entrance. His speech followed by a Persian translation of his speech by Daivari, mistakenly referred to as Arabic by Hassan and the commentary team. Hassan's gimmick also involved him interrupting promos by other wrestlers with his theme music and approaching the ring to cut promos of his own, typically complaining about being held back due to anti-Arab prejudice.

Making his entrance into the WWE, he berated the way the media have characterized Arab-Americans after September 11. As an example, he focused his anger on Raw announcers Jerry "The King" Lawler and Jim Ross. He and Daivari faced the two announcers in an in-ring debate on the January 3, 2005 episode of Raw. He then defeated Lawler in his debut match at the New Year's Revolution pay-per-view event on January 9. In the course of his undefeated streak, Hassan defeated wrestlers such as The Hurricane, Sgt. Slaughter, Chris Benoit and Chris Jericho. Hassan had attracted much heat as a heel, a fact which was evident at the Royal Rumble on January 30 in the Royal Rumble match itself. When Hassan entered at number 13, everyone who was in the ring at the time (Booker T, Chris Benoit, Chris Jericho, Edge, Eddie Guerrero, Luther Reigns, Rey Mysterio and Shelton Benjamin) immediately ganged up on Hassan and eliminated him. Notably, Edge and Reigns were also heels at the time.

At WrestleMania 21 on April 3, Hassan and Daivari were featured in a segment with Hulk Hogan that saw Hogan coming to the rescue of wrestler Eugene, who was being attacked by Hassan and Daivari. The next night on Raw, Hassan and Daivari came out to confront and assault face Shawn Michaels. The following week on Raw, Michaels approached Raw General Manager Eric Bischoff demanding a handicap match with Hassan and Daivari. Bischoff refused, but he did tell Michaels to find a partner and he would grant a match. Michaels then made a plea for Hogan to come back and team with him. On the April 18 episode of Raw, Hassan again led an attack on Michaels until Hogan appeared to save Michaels and accept his offer.

At Backlash on May 1, Hassan and Daivari lost to Hogan and Michaels, with Daivari being pinned. Hassan would blame and attack Daivari for the loss the next night on Raw. On the May 30 episode of Raw, Hassan faced then World Heavyweight Champion Batista and won by disqualification. However, he and Daivari were beaten by Batista after the match. The next week on Raw, Hassan was granted a two-on-one handicap match with Daivari for the Intercontinental Championship against Shelton Benjamin after threatening Raw General Manager Eric Bischoff with a lawsuit for Batista's actions. After Hassan initially appeared to pin Benjamin and won the title, the referee realized Benjamin was on the ropes and reversed his decision. Benjamin eventually pinned Daivari to retain the Intercontinental Championship. On the June 13 episode of Raw, Stone Cold Steve Austin appeared as a special guest enforcer on the request of Bischoff to listen to Hassan's complaints. After making fun of Hassan and Daivari calling them sand people, Austin claimed to agree with them and ordered a match between Hassan and Benjamin for the Intercontinental Championship that night, stating that Hassan was "screwed by the system". As Hassan was about to win the match with the help of Daivari, Austin entered the ring and delivered a Stone Cold Stunner to both Hassan and Daivari, making Hassan the winner by disqualification and allowing Benjamin to retain the title as it cannot change hands by a disqualification unless stipulated.

On the June 20 episode of Raw, Hassan and Daivari interrupted a promo by then WWE Champion John Cena to complain about how Hassan was "screwed" out of the Intercontinental Championship. Bischoff took the opportunity to punish Cena by booking him against Hassan in a WWE Championship match, in which Hassan's losing streak in title matches continued as Cena dominated him in a two-minute squash match, pinning him cleanly and thus ending his "unpinned" streak.

On the June 23 episode of SmackDown!, it was revealed both Hassan and Daivari were drafted to the SmackDown! brand in the 2005 draft lottery. Hassan won his first SmackDown! match by defeating Big Show with help from Big Show's rival Matt Morgan. The following week on the June 30 episode of SmackDown!, Hassan was involved in a confrontation with The Undertaker during a six-man elimination match.

==== SmackDown! controversy and departure (2005) ====
In one of the most controversial moments in WWE history, on the episode of SmackDown! taped on July 4 (aired July 7), the SmackDown! General Manager Theodore Long put Hassan in a No. 1 Contender's match against The Undertaker at The Great American Bash on July 24 and placed Daivari in a match that night against The Undertaker. Daivari was defeated, but Hassan began to "pray" on the ramp, summoning five masked men, dressed in black shirts, ski-masks, and camo pants. Armed with clubs and a piano wire, they beat and choked The Undertaker out, and Hassan put him in the camel clutch. Afterward, the masked men lifted Daivari above their heads and carried him away. Three days later, the London bombings took place. The footage aired unedited on UPN in the United States and on The Score in Canada with an advisory warning shown several times during the broadcast. It was removed from the Australian and European (including in the United Kingdom) broadcasts.

The angle elicited national attention in the New York Post, TV Guide, Variety, and other major media outlets. In response to the criticism, UPN decided that it would monitor the storyline closely and that it did not want the Hassan character on its network that week. Hassan later delivered a promo to the live crowd for the July 14 episode of SmackDown!, but when UPN announced that the segment would be edited, WWE decided to host the video of the segment on its official website. In the segment, Hassan reiterated that he was an Arab-American and that the American people automatically and unfairly assumed that he was a terrorist. Despite being in character, he referred to the real-world media coverage of the storyline, singling out the New York Post's Don Kaplan by name, and denouncing his description of the events on SmackDown!, such as Kaplan's comment of the masked men being "Arabs in ski masks". On the July 14 episode of SmackDown!, Hassan's absence was explained by a statement delivered by his lawyer Thomas Whitney, which said that Hassan refused to appear at The Great American Bash due to the way he had been treated by the media and WWE fans.

It was revealed in late July that UPN had pressured WWE to keep Hassan off of their network, effectively deleting him from SmackDown!. Hassan lost the match to The Undertaker at The Great American Bash, despite the masked men appearing a second time to assist him, and was written off with The Undertaker doing a Last Ride through an open stage ramp onto a concrete floor where it was reported that he sustained serious injuries and had to be rushed to a nearby medical facility, apparently a solution aimed to end the Hassan character. Several days later, WWE.com hosted a video of a kayfabe announcement from Theodore Long, where he reiterates the stipulation that Hassan would no longer appear on SmackDown!. Due to increasing public pressure, WWE was forced to later drop the character altogether, sending Copani and Daivari back to their developmental territories to alter their gimmicks. This resulted in huge fan backlash, mostly because Hassan was at the height of his notoriety. Copani was released from his WWE contract on September 21, and announced his retirement from professional wrestling. In subsequent years, it was revealed that Hassan had been planned to receive a major push, eventually winning the World Heavyweight Championship from Batista on August 21 at SummerSlam.

=== Independent circuit (2018) ===
On April 28, 2018, Hassan returned to professional wrestling for the first time in thirteen years, appearing at The Dynasty event Dynasty King of Thrones, defeating Papadon. Hassan defeated Bin Hamin for the Dynasty Heavyweight Championship on June 6, but then immediately vacated the belt. He returned to the promotion on September 29, defeating Sean Carr. In 2019 he would state in an interview that he would never wrestle again due to his other career as a principal.

== Personal life ==
After leaving WWE, Copani went back to college and became an educator. He became a world history teacher at Hannibal High School in Hannibal, New York, before becoming assistant principal at G Ray Bodley High School in Fulton, New York. In 2019, he was principal of Fulton Junior High School. As of 2024, Copani is the Director of Human Resources for the Fulton City School District.

In July 2016, Copani was named part of a class action lawsuit filed against WWE which alleged that wrestlers incurred traumatic brain injuries during their tenure and that the company concealed the risks of injury. The suit was litigated by attorney Konstantine Kyros, who has been involved in a number of other lawsuits against WWE. US District Judge Vanessa Lynne Bryant dismissed the lawsuit in September 2018.

== Other media ==
In 2011 and 2012, Copani's graphic novel he wrote with Shad Gaspard of Cryme Tyme, Assassin & Son, won several awards for best original independent graphic novel. Gaspard came up with the original concept/premise and wrote the screenplay along with Copani. The series is said to be a modern version of Kazuo Koike's Lone Wolf and Cub.

In May 2025, Hassan appeared on a Vice's Dark Side of the Ring episode titled "Becoming Muhammad Hassan".

In 2026, Copani will be publishing his memoir, HEAT: The Rise and Fall of Muhammad Hassan.

=== Video games ===
Hassan appears as a playable character in the video games WWE SmackDown! vs. Raw 2006 and WWE Day of Reckoning 2.

== Championships and accomplishments ==
- The Dynasty
  - Dynasty Heavyweight Championship (1 time)
- Ohio Valley Wrestling
  - OVW Heavyweight Championship (1 time)
- Pro Wrestling Illustrated
  - Ranked No. 33 of the top 500 singles wrestlers in the PWI 500 in 2005
- Wrestling Observer Newsletter
  - Most Disgusting Promotional Tactic (2005) – Terrorist angle on day of London bombings
