= Vengeance (2004) =

World Wrestling Entertainment pay-per-view event

- Promotional poster featuring Randy Orton
- Promotion: World Wrestling Entertainment
- Brand: Raw
- Date: July 11, 2004
- City: Hartford, Connecticut
- Venue: Hartford Civic Center
- Attendance: 7,000
- Buy rate: 240,000

Pay-per-view chronology
| ← Previous; The Great American Bash | Next → SummerSlam |

Vengeance chronology
| ← Previous; 2003 | Next → 2005 |

The 2004 Vengeance was a professional wrestling pay-per-view (PPV) event produced by World Wrestling Entertainment (WWE). It was the fourth annual Vengeance and took place on July 11, 2004, from the Hartford Civic Center in Hartford, Connecticut, held exclusively for wrestlers from the promotion's Raw brand division.

The main event saw Chris Benoit defeat Triple H to retain the World Heavyweight Championship. In the predominant match on the card, Edge defeated Randy Orton to win the WWE Intercontinental Championship. The primary matches on the undercard included Matt Hardy defeating Kane in a No Disqualification match and Batista defeating Chris Jericho.

The event grossed US$370,000 with 7,000 ticket sales and had a 0.43 buyrate. Following the event, Benoit began a feud with Randy Orton over the World Heavyweight Championship. The two would have a match at SummerSlam, where Orton would win the World Heavyweight Championship, and become the youngest world champion in WWE history. Edge went on to defend the Intercontinental Championship against Batista and Chris Jericho in a Triple Threat match at SummerSlam. Kane and Matt Hardy continued their feud at SummerSlam in a "Till Death Do Us Part" match, where the winner would get to marry Lita. Kane was the victor, and as a result, Lita had to marry Kane.

== Production ==
=== Background ===
Vengeance was an annual professional wrestling pay-per-view (PPV) event produced by World Wrestling Entertainment (WWE) since 2001. The first event was held in December before it moved up to July in 2002, establishing it as the annual July PPV. The fourth event was held on July 11, 2004, from the Hartford Civic Center in Hartford, Connecticut. While the previous year's event was held exclusively for wrestlers from the SmackDown! brand, the 2004 event was held exclusively for Raw.

=== Storylines ===
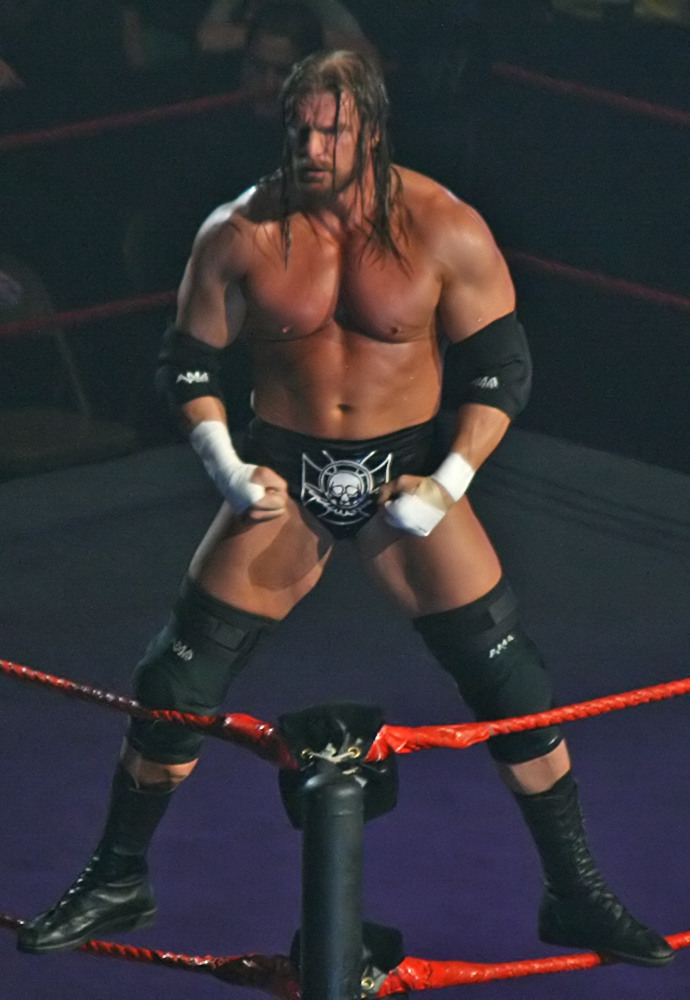
Triple H, who challenged Chris Benoit for the World Heavyweight Championship

The main feud heading into Vengeance was between Chris Benoit and Triple H, with the two battling over the World Heavyweight Championship. At the Royal Rumble, Benoit won the Royal Rumble match which earned him a World Heavyweight Championship match against Triple H at WrestleMania XX. At WrestleMania, Benoit defeated Triple H and Shawn Michaels in a Triple Threat match to win the World Heavyweight Championship by forcing Triple H to submit to the Crippler Crossface. At Backlash, Benoit successfully defended the World Heavyweight Championship in another Triple Threat match against Triple H and Michaels, after he forced Michaels to submit to the Sharpshooter. Following Backlash, Benoit had a small feud with Kane, while Michaels and Triple H would finish their feud at Bad Blood. On the June 14 episode of Raw, Triple H demanded another World Heavyweight title shot. It would later be granted to him by Raw General Manager Eric Bischoff to fight against Benoit at Vengeance for the championship, but Bischoff asked for Triple H to defeat his nephew, Eugene. Triple H tried to befriend Eugene, who was a fan of him. On the June 21 episode of Raw, Triple H faced Eugene in a match and tried to hit him with a chair, per Bischoff's orders, only for Benoit to run in for the save. Benoit, however, accidentally hit Eugene with the chair, making Triple H hit Benoit with a Pedigree. On the June 28 episode of Raw, Triple H offered Eugene to be an honorary member of Evolution, making William Regal confront Triple H. Later on, Triple H defeated Regal by disqualification as Eugene was the guest referee, making Eugene attack Regal. On the July 5 episode of Raw, Benoit teamed up with Edge and fought against Ric Flair, Eugene and Triple H. Triple H, Flair and Eugene won after Eugene hit Benoit with a chair.

Another primary feud heading into the event was between Edge and Randy Orton over the WWE Intercontinental Championship. After Edge came back from his injury, he vowed to take Evolution out. He started it by facing them, together with Chris Jericho and Chris Benoit, in a six men tag team elimination match on the June 14 episode of Raw, which Edge, Jericho and Benoit won. On the June 21 episode of Raw, Edge speared Orton, but then he and Jericho lost to him and Batista in a tag team match later on. On the June 28 episode of Raw, Edge and Jericho defeated Batista and Orton in a rematch. On the July 5 episode of Raw, Edge confronted Evolution, attacking them.

One of the main matches on the undercard was a No Disqualification match between Matt Hardy and Kane. On the May 17 episode of Raw, Kane attacked Hardy, and Lita promised him something for him to stop. On the June 21 episode of Raw, as Hardy proposed to Lita, Kane revealed that Lita was pregnant with his child, and not with Matt's child, as she slept with Kane in order to protect Hardy. On the June 28 episode of Raw, Hardy attacked Kane and was banned from ringside for the main event, which featured Kane challenging Chris Benoit for the World Heavyweight Championship. Kane lost, and then Lita attacked Kane in order to make him chokeslam her and losing the child. Kane, however, refused to do so. On the July 5 episode of Raw, Hardy attacked Kane again, and then was booked in a No Disqualification match against him at Vengeance.

Another one of the main matches on the undercard was a singles match between Chris Jericho and Batista. The feud started on the June 14 episode of Raw where Jericho eliminated Batista from a six man tag team elimination match. On the June 21 episode of Raw, during a tag team match pitting Jericho and Edge against Batista and Randy Orton, Batista knocked Jericho out before he and Orton won the match. On the June 28 episode of Raw, Jericho pinned Batista in a tag team rematch. On the July 5 episode of Raw, Batista cost Jericho a match for the WWE Intercontinental Championship against Orton.

== Event ==
Other on-screen personnel
| Role: | Name: |
|---|---|
| English commentators | Jim Ross |
| English commentators | Jerry Lawler |
| Spanish commentators | Carlos Cabrera |
| Spanish commentators | Hugo Savinovich |
| Interviewers | Jonathan Coachman |
| Interviewers | Todd Grisham |
| Ring announcer | Lilian Garcia |
| Referees | Mike Chioda |
| Referees | Chad Patton |
| Referees | Jack Doan |
| Referees | Earl Hebner |

Before the pay-per-view went on live. Tyson Tomko defeated Val Venis in a match on Sunday Night Heat, by pinfall after performing a Kick to the face.

=== Preliminary matches ===
The first match saw Tajiri and Rhyno face Garrison Cade and Jonathan Coachman. Rhyno performed a Gore on Cade and Tajiri performed a Roundhouse Kick on Coachman for the win.

The second match saw Batista face Chris Jericho. Batista gained the advantage early on, and put Jericho in a choke hold. Jericho countered the move into the Walls of Jericho. Batista won the match after a Batista Bomb. Jericho did put his foot on the ropes, but the referee failed to see it.

The next match was Eugene and Ric Flair facing La Résistance (Róbert Conway and Sylvain Grenier) for the World Tag Team Championship. The match started with Eugene using Flair's signature taunts to anger La Résistance, but La Résistance gained the advantage. Eugene was disqualified after he pushed the referee, meaning La Resistance retained the title. After the match ended, Eugene attacked both members of La Résistance.

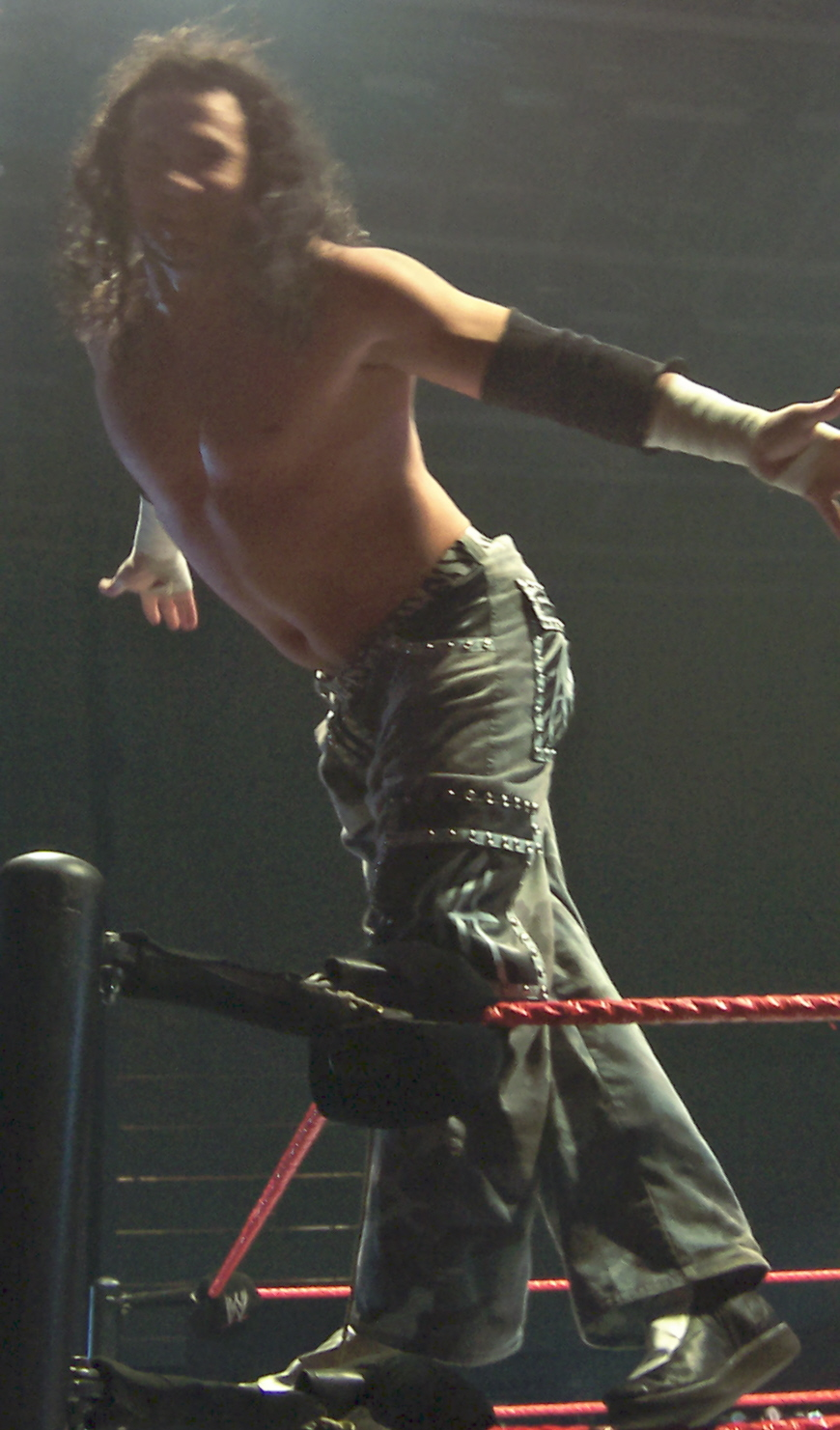
Matt Hardy, who faced Kane in a No Disqualification match

The next match was a No Disqualification match between Matt Hardy and Kane. The match started on the outside with Kane getting the upper hand but Hardy hit him with a television monitor. Hardy attempted a Twist of Fate through a broadcast table but Kane countered by pushing Hardy into the security wall. Kane retrieved the steel steps but Lita distracted him, allowing Hardy to hit Kane with a steel chair to win the match.

Next was a match for the WWE Intercontinental Championship between Randy Orton and Edge. The match started off with Edge getting the advantage. Orton attempted an RKO but Edge countered by pushing Orton into the ropes and attempted a Spear but Orton avoided the move. Orton attempted an RKO but Edge countered into a backslide pin and executed a spear to win the title.

The sixth match was between Victoria and Molly Holly to determine the #1 contender for the WWE Women's Championship. Victoria executed a Superkick to win the match.

=== Main event ===
The main event was between Chris Benoit and Triple H for the World Heavyweight Championship. During the match, Benoit inadvertently knocked down the referee. Triple H executed the Pedigree but the referee was incapacitated. Triple H then called out Eugene, and told him to get a steel chair. Benoit attacked Triple H and knocked Eugene off the ring apron. Triple H then hit Benoit with a low blow and retrieved the chair. Triple H tried to hit Benoit with the chair but Eugene stopped him, causing Triple H to attack him. Eugene fought with Benoit over the chair and Eugene inadvertently hit Triple H with chair. Benoit pinned Triple H with a roll-up to retain the title.

== Aftermath ==
The next night on Raw, Eugene apologized to Evolution (Batista, Ric Flair, Randy Orton, and Triple H), and Triple H told Eugene to go see Eric Bischoff. Bischoff booked a match between Chris Benoit and Eugene later that night for the World Heavyweight Championship. At the end of the match, Evolution then come out and attacked Eugene and Benoit. William Regal attempted to help Eugene, but was stopped by Evolution. The feud between Triple H and Eugene lasted until SummerSlam, where they had a match, which Triple H won by pinfall.

On the July 26 episode of Raw, 20 men competed in an over the top rope Battle Royal to determine the number one contendership for the World Heavyweight Championship at SummerSlam. Randy Orton won the match by last eliminating Chris Jericho. At SummerSlam, Orton faced Chris Benoit for the World Heavyweight Championship, which Orton won by pinfall after performing an RKO. On the August 16 episode of Raw, Orton defeated Chris Benoit in a rematch to retain the World Heavyweight Championship. After the match, Batista, Ric Flair, and Triple H, threw Orton a mock celebration, only to turn on him. Flair and Batista attacked Orton as Triple H told him that he was nothing without Evolution. On the August 23 episode of Raw, Triple H told Orton to give him the title or pay the price. Orton refused, spat in Triple H's face and hit him with the title belt. General manager Eric Bischoff scheduled a match between Orton and Triple H for the title at Unforgiven. At Unforgiven, Orton lost the title when he was pinned by Triple H.

== Results ==
| No. | Results | Stipulations | Times |
|---|---|---|---|
| 1^{H} | Tyson Tomko (with Trish Stratus) defeated Val Venis (with Nidia) | Singles match | 2:52 |
| 2 | Tajiri and Rhyno defeated Garrison Cade and Jonathan Coachman | Tag team match | 7:30 |
| 3 | Batista defeated Chris Jericho | Singles match | 12:11 |
| 4 | La Résistance (Sylvain Grenier and Robért Conway) (c) defeated Ric Flair and Eugene by disqualification | Tag team match for the World Tag Team Championship | 12:30 |
| 5 | Matt Hardy defeated Kane | No Disqualification match | 10:34 |
| 6 | Edge defeated Randy Orton (c) | Singles match for the WWE Intercontinental Championship | 26:36 |
| 7 | Victoria defeated Molly Holly | Singles match to determine the #1 contender for the WWE Women's Championship | 6:22 |
| 8 | Chris Benoit (c) defeated Triple H | Singles match for the World Heavyweight Championship | 29:06 |
(c) / – the champion(s) heading into the match; H / – the match was broadcast prior to the pay-per-view on Sunday Night Heat
