= Evolution (professional wrestling) =

Professional wrestling stable

- Stable logo

Stable
- Name: Evolution
- Leader: Triple H
- Members: Ric Flair; Randy Orton; Batista
- Combined billed weight: 1,027 lb (466 kg)
- Debut: January 20, 2003, April 14, 2014
- Disbanded: October 3, 2005, June 2, 2014
- Years active: 2003–2005; 2007; 2014; 2018 (Non Wrestling Reunion)

Evolution was a villainous American professional wrestling stable in WWE which was a part of the Raw brand from 2003 to 2005, as well as during 2007 and 2014.

At the height of its original existence, the group consisted of Triple H, Ric Flair, Randy Orton and Batista. The quartet has been referred to as a modern iteration of Flair's former stable, The Four Horsemen. Evolution slowly began dissolving after SummerSlam 2004, when Orton won the World Heavyweight Championship and was kicked out of the group. After winning the Royal Rumble in 2005, Batista betrayed Triple H and Flair, turning face, and decided to pursue the World Heavyweight Championship himself. Although Batista's departure was largely the end for the group, the final break up came when Triple H turned on and attacked Flair during Raw's Homecoming episode. During the breakup, each member faced one another at least once.

Evolution later reformed on April 14, 2014 as a sub-group to The Authority after Batista joined forces with Triple H and Orton.

== Concept ==
Each member of Evolution represented the best in: "the past" (Ric Flair), "the present" (Triple H), and "the future" (Randy Orton and Batista) of professional wrestling. Triple H would reveal on his 2013 Triple H - Thy Kingdom Come DVD that Mark Jindrak was originally planned to be in the group in Batista's role as the Arn Anderson-like enforcer, with Jindrak even shooting vignettes with the rest of the group, before it was decided to make Batista part of the group instead. This was further elaborated in 2020, when it was revealed that Vince McMahon wanted Jindrak in the group to replace Batista due to his triceps injuries in 2003. However, Triple H felt that Jindrak was not mature enough for the group and also felt that he was dragging Orton down, an assessment mutually agreed by Jindrak himself. Ultimately, management decided to place Jindrak in a tag team with Garrison Cade while the rest of Evolution waited for Batista to return to health, which proved to work out for all parties involved, including Jindrak, who would have a successful career in Mexico following his WWE departure in 2005.

== History ==
=== Original run (2002–2005) ===
==== Formation (2002–2003) ====
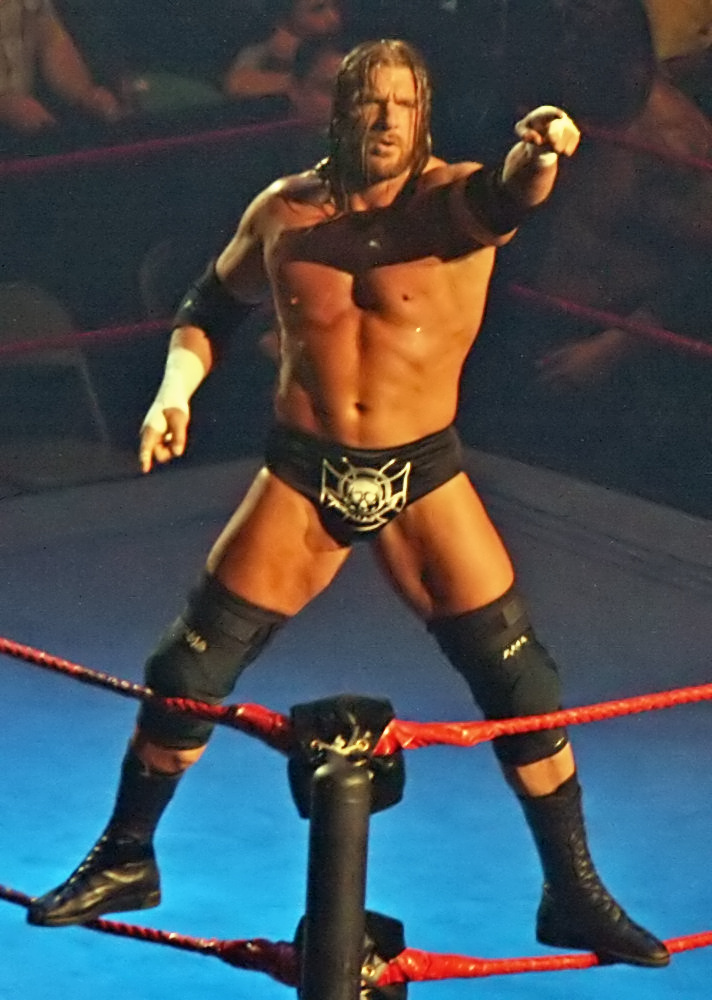
Triple H, the leader of Evolution

At Unforgiven on September 22, 2002, Triple H defended the World Heavyweight Championship against Rob Van Dam. During the match, Ric Flair, who had been verbally mocked by Triple H in the locker room earlier in the night following his Intercontinental Championship loss to Chris Jericho, came down to the ring and grabbed the sledgehammer from Triple H and teased hitting him before hitting Van Dam instead, allowing Triple H to get the win. From that point on, Flair accompanied Triple H to the ring as his manager. Shortly thereafter, Batista moved from SmackDown! to Raw and Flair also began accompanying him to the ring as a manager and mentor while continuing to second Triple H. On the January 20, 2003 episode of Raw, Randy Orton, who had been out of action due to a shoulder injury, returned and joined Triple H, Flair and Batista in attacking Scott Steiner to complete the group. Two weeks later, the group officially got its name when Triple H, after the group jumped Tommy Dreamer, spoke about how the four men were examples of professional wrestling's evolution from the past (Flair) to the present (himself) to the future (Batista and Orton). During the group's early stages, however, Batista was out of action for nearly eight months due to a triceps tear.

==== Dominance (2003–2005) ====
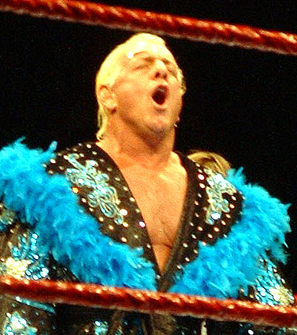
Ric Flair, the mentor of the group

At Bad Blood on June 15, Flair defeated Shawn Michaels in a singles match after Orton struck Michaels with a chair. Later that night, Triple H retained his World Heavyweight Championship against Kevin Nash in a Hell in a Cell match. On the June 23 episode of Raw, Triple H successfully defended the title against Kane in a match with a "Title vs. Mask" stipulation, forcing Kane to unmask. At Unforgiven on September 21, Orton defeated Michaels to help establish his "Legend Killer" gimmick. Later that night, Triple H lost the World Heavyweight Championship to Goldberg. The following week on Raw, Triple H issued a $100,000 bounty to anybody who could take out Goldberg. On the October 20 episode of Raw, Batista made his return from injury during Goldberg's World Heavyweight Championship defense against Michaels, attacking Goldberg and finishing by stomping on a steel chair with Goldberg's ankle sandwiched in it to claim the bounty. At Survivor Series on November 16, Orton participated in the Team Bischoff versus Team Austin elimination tag team match, in which he was the sole survivor. Later that night, Triple H failed to regain the World Heavyweight Championship from Goldberg.

At the height of Evolution's power, the group controlled all of the male-based championships of Raw after Armageddon on December 14. Batista and Flair won the World Tag Team Championship in a tag team turmoil match, Orton captured the Intercontinental Championship from Rob Van Dam, and Triple H regained the World Heavyweight Championship from Goldberg in a triple threat match also involving Kane.

On January 25, 2004 at Royal Rumble, Flair and Batista successfully defended the World Tag Team Championship against the Dudley Boyz (Bubba Ray Dudley and D-Von Dudley) in a tables match, and World Heavyweight Champion Triple H fought Shawn Michaels to a no contest in a Last Man Standing match, thus retaining the championship. On the February 16 episode of Raw, Flair and Batista lost the World Tag Team Championship to Booker T and Van Dam. At WrestleMania XX on March 14, Evolution defeated the Rock 'n' Sock Connection (The Rock and Mick Foley) in a 3-on-2 handicap match. Later that night, Triple H lost the World Heavyweight Championship to Chris Benoit in a triple threat match also involving Michaels when he tapped out to the Crippler Crossface. On the March 22 episode of Raw, Flair and Batista defeated Booker T and Van Dam to regain the World Tag Team Championship. At Backlash on April 18, Flair lost to Shelton Benjamin. Later that night, Orton successfully defended the Intercontinental Championship against Foley in a hardcore match, while Triple H failed to regain the title in a triple threat rematch after Benoit forced Michaels to submit with the Sharpshooter. While still World Heavyweight Champion, Benoit teamed with Edge to win the World Tag Team Championship from Flair and Batista on the April 19 episode of Raw. At Bad Blood on June 13, Triple H defeated Michaels in a Hell in a Cell match to end their feud.

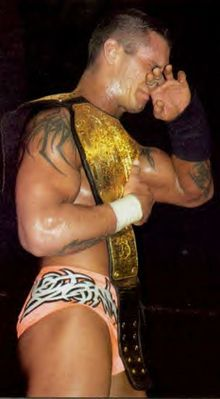
Randy Orton after he won the World Heavyweight Championship at SummerSlam in August 2004

In mid-2004, Eugene befriended Triple H, who seemingly reciprocated the friendship. At Vengeance on July 11, it was revealed that Triple H had used Eugene to try and regain the World Heavyweight Championship from Benoit, but he was unsuccessful after Eugene inadvertently hit him with a chair. On the same night, Edge defeated Orton to end his seven-month long Intercontinental Championship reign. Triple H received one final shot at the World Heavyweight Championship on the July 26 episode of Raw in a 60-minute Iron Man match. Earlier that night, Orton won a battle royal to determine the number one contender for the title at SummerSlam, teasing a title match between him and Triple H. However, Eugene interfered in the Iron Man match and helped Benoit take the lead and retain the title in the final seconds, making the main event of SummerSlam a title match between Benoit and Orton. At SummerSlam on August 15, Orton pinned Benoit to become the new World Heavyweight Champion and the youngest world champion in WWE history to date.

The next night on Raw, after successfully defending the title in a rematch against Benoit, Orton was kicked out of Evolution. Batista hoisted Orton on to his shoulders in what appeared to be a celebration, but following the thumbs down from Triple H, the group proceeded to attack Orton. On the August 23 episode of Raw, Triple H demanded that Orton "make the right decision" and give him the World Heavyweight Championship belt, but Orton refused and spat in his face. At Unforgiven on September 12, Triple H defeated Orton to regain the World Heavyweight Championship with help from Flair, Batista and Jonathan Coachman. At Survivor Series on November 14, Triple H, Batista, Gene Snitsky and Edge lost to Orton, Maven, Chris Jericho and Benoit in a Survivor Series match where the winning team would gain control of Raw over the following month. On the December 6 episode of Raw, the championship was vacated when a triple threat match the previous week with Triple H, Edge and Benoit ended in a double pin (Edge tapped out to Benoit's Crippler Crossface while he simultaneously had Benoit pinned to the ground), and the title was to be decided in an Elimination Chamber match at New Year's Revolution on January 9, 2005.

==== Breakup (2005) ====
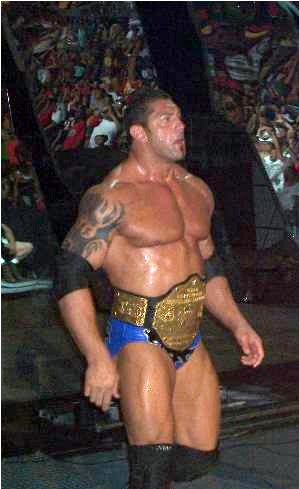
Batista during his first reign as World Heavyweight Champion in September 2005

In the Elimination Chamber match at New Year's Revolution, Batista, Orton and Triple H were the last three remaining in the match. Orton eliminated Batista with an RKO and Triple H pinned Orton with Batista's help to win the title. On the following night's Raw, Orton defeated Batista to gain a title shot at the Royal Rumble on January 30. Triple H suggested that Batista not enter the Royal Rumble match, wanting the group to focus on Triple H retaining the title. Batista declined, entered the Royal Rumble match at number 28 and won by last eliminating John Cena. Earlier that night, Triple H defeated Orton to retain the title, ending their feud.

Following Batista's Royal Rumble win, Triple H tried to persuade him to challenge WWE Champion John "Bradshaw" Layfield (JBL) of SmackDown! rather than challenge him for his World Heavyweight Championship. This involved Triple H plotting a feud between JBL and Batista, showing JBL badmouthing Batista in an interview and staging an attack on Batista with a limousine designed to look like JBL's, but Batista became aware of the scheme while sneakily eavesdropping on fellow Evolution members. On the February 21 episode of Raw, during the brand contract signing ceremony, Batista chose to remain on Raw, powerbombing Triple H through a table and leaving the faction, turning face in the process. At WrestleMania 21 on April 3, Batista defeated Triple H to win the World Heavyweight Championship. He successfully defended the title against Triple H at Backlash on May 1 and in a Hell in a Cell match at Vengeance on June 26. On the June 30 episode of SmackDown!, Batista was drafted to SmackDown! as the last pick in the 2005 WWE draft lottery, effectively ending Triple H's pursuits for the title.

After Vengeance, Triple H took some time off due to neck issues, not being seen on WWE television for four months. In the interim, Flair turned face and won the Intercontinental Championship from Carlito at Unforgiven on September 18. Triple H returned to action at the "WWE Homecoming" episode of Raw on October 3, teaming with Flair to defeat Carlito and Chris Masters. After the match, Triple H betrayed Flair and attacked him with a sledgehammer, marking the definitive end of Evolution. Flair then defeated Triple H in a steel cage match to retain the Intercontinental Championship at Taboo Tuesday on November 1. Triple H defeated Flair in a Last Man Standing match at Survivor Series on November 27.

=== Reunions (2007–present) ===
On December 10, 2007, Evolution had an in-ring reunion as faces on the Raw 15th Anniversary special episode, where Batista, Flair and Triple H defeated the team of Orton (who has former member Evolution as heel), Edge and Umaga.

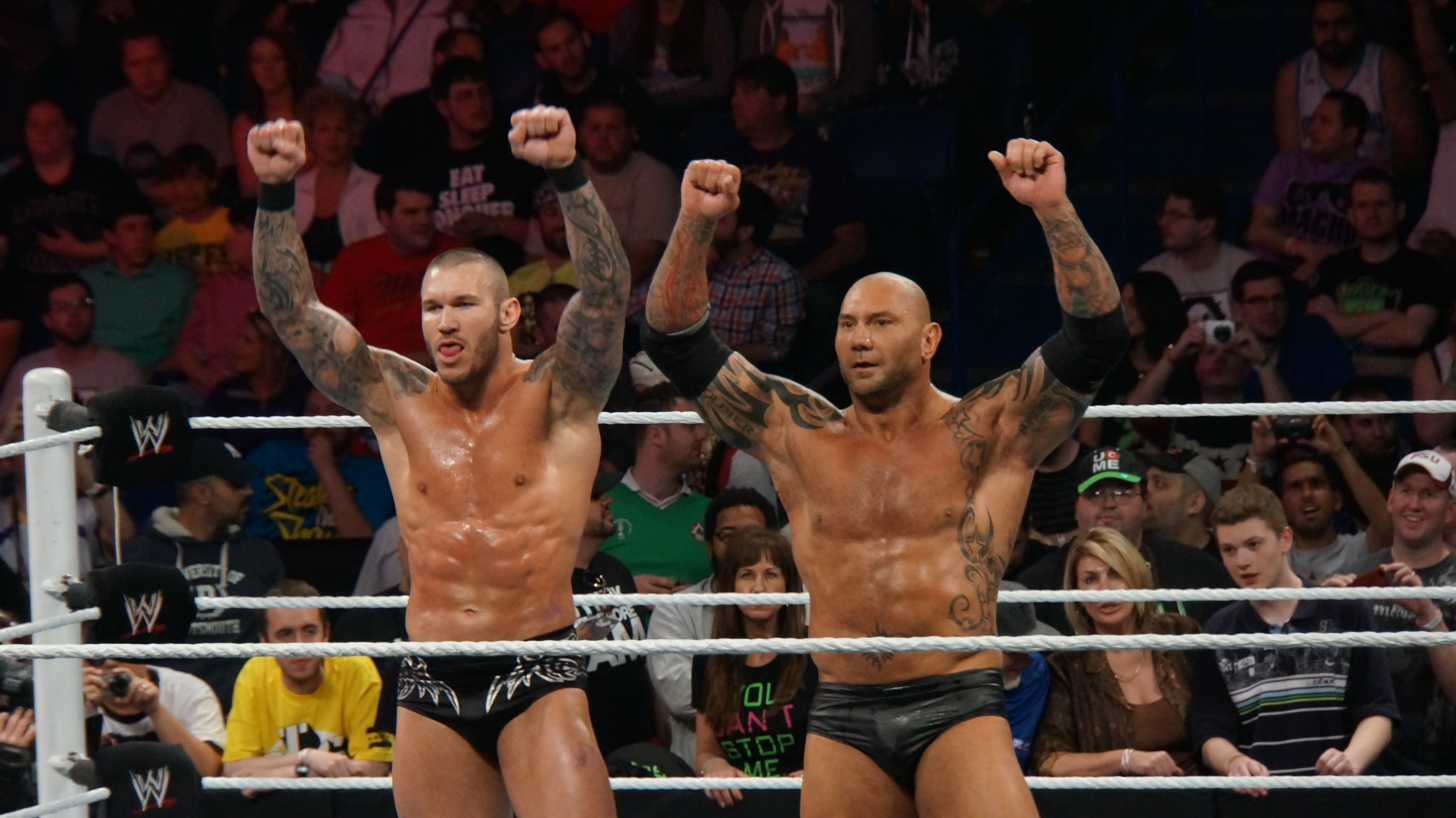
Orton and Batista in April 2014

At SummerSlam on August 18, 2013, Triple H and Orton once again joined forces to form the heel stable The Authority. At WrestleMania XXX on April 6, 2014, the two men would be joined by Batista after Daniel Bryan defeated Triple H in the opening match, and then Orton and Batista in the main event triple threat match to win the WWE World Heavyweight Championship. The next night on Raw, Batista and Orton teamed together for the first time in ten years to face The Usos for the WWE Tag Team Championship, but the match ended in a no contest due to both teams being counted out. Later that night, Batista and Orton, along with Kane, attacked Bryan before he was set to defend his title against Triple H. Before Triple H could defeat Bryan, however, The Shield interrupted by spearing him and taking out Orton, Batista and Kane, thus Bryan retained the title via no contest.

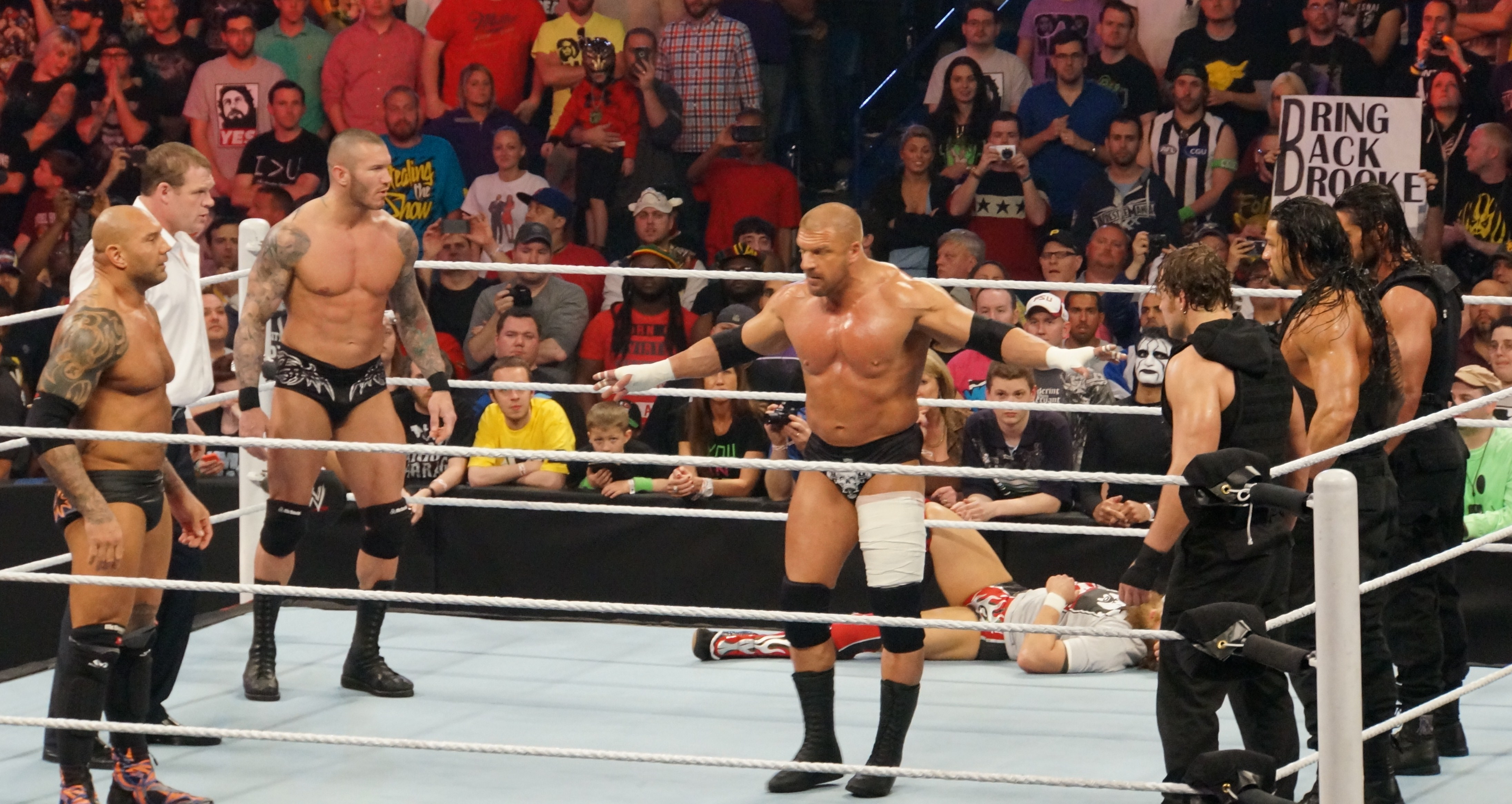
The Authority (with Triple H, Batista and Orton as Evolution) face off with The Shield in April 2014

On the April 14 episode of Raw, Triple H, Orton and Batista attacked The Shield after their 11-on-3 handicap match, using the name and the theme of Evolution, officially reuniting the group. Evolution lost to The Shield at Extreme Rules on May 4 and in a No Holds Barred elimination tag match at Payback on June 1, in which none of The Shield were eliminated. On the June 2 episode of Raw, Batista quit the WWE (kayfabe) after his title match request was denied by Triple H due to Bryan's neck injury at the time rendering him unable to complete. This was done to write Batista off WWE television so he could promote Guardians of the Galaxy. However, on June 12, Batista legitimately quit after an appearance on NXT due to creative differences. Later that night, Triple H declared that he had resorted to "Plan B" in his quest to destroy The Shield, prompting Seth Rollins to betray and attack Dean Ambrose and Roman Reigns, joining The Authority and dissolving The Shield.

Evolution reunited on SmackDown's 1000th episode on October 16, 2018, where Batista reminded Triple H that he had never defeated him. Batista attacked Flair before the latter's 70th birthday celebration on the February 25, 2019 episode of Raw. At WrestleMania 35 on April 7, Batista and Triple H would face each other in a No Holds Barred match with their careers on the line, which Triple H won after Flair returned and distracted Batista.

== Members ==
*	Founding member(s)
L	Leader

Member		Joined	Left
Triple H	*L	January 20, 2003; April 14, 2014	October 3, 2005; June 2, 2014
Ric Flair	*	January 20, 2003	October 3, 2005
Randy Orton	*	January 20, 2003; April 14, 2014	August 16, 2004; June 2, 2014
Batista	*	January 20, 2003; April 14, 2014	February 21, 2005; June 2, 2014

== Championships and accomplishments ==
- Pro Wrestling Illustrated
  - Match of the Year (2004) – Triple H vs. Chris Benoit and Shawn Michaels at WrestleMania XX
  - Feud of the Year (2004) – Triple H vs. Chris Benoit
  - Most Hated Wrestler of the Year (2003, 2004, 2005) – Triple H
- World Wrestling Entertainment
  - World Heavyweight Championship (5 times) – Triple H (4), Randy Orton (1)
  - World Tag Team Championship (2 times) – Batista and Ric Flair
  - WWE Intercontinental Championship (1 time) – Randy Orton
  - Royal Rumble (2005) – Batista
- Wrestling Observer Newsletter
  - Feud of the Year (2004) Triple H vs. Chris Benoit vs. Shawn Michaels
  - Feud of the Year (2005) Triple H vs. Batista
  - Most Overrated (2003, 2004) – Triple H
  - Readers' Least Favorite Wrestler (2003) – Triple H
  - Worst Match of the Year (2003) Triple H vs. Scott Steiner on January 19
