= SummerSlam (2004) =

World Wrestling Entertainment pay-per-view event

- Promotional poster featuring various WWE wrestlers
- Promotion: World Wrestling Entertainment
- Brand(s): Raw; SmackDown!
- Date: August 15, 2004
- City: Toronto, Ontario, Canada
- Venue: Air Canada Centre
- Attendance: 17,640
- Buy rate: 320,000
- Tagline: Let the Games Begin.

Pay-per-view chronology
← Previous; Vengeance	Next → Unforgiven

SummerSlam chronology
← Previous; 2003	Next → 2005

WWE in Canada chronology
← Previous; Backlash	Next → Unforgiven

The 2004 SummerSlam was a professional wrestling pay-per-view (PPV) event produced by the American promotion World Wrestling Entertainment (WWE). It was the 17th annual SummerSlam and took place on August 15, 2004, at the Air Canada Centre in Toronto, Ontario, Canada, held for wrestlers from the promotion's Raw and SmackDown! brand divisions. It was held during the 2004 Summer Olympics in reference to the promotional poster. This was the second SummerSlam to take place outside of the United States, after the 1992 event in London, England.

Nine matches were contested at the event, including one on the Sunday Night Heat pre-show. The main match on the Raw brand was Chris Benoit defending the World Heavyweight Championship against Randy Orton, which Orton won by pinfall after performing an RKO, becoming the youngest world champion in WWE history at the age of 24. The predominant match on the SmackDown! brand was John "Bradshaw" Layfield (JBL) versus The Undertaker for the WWE Championship, which JBL won to retain after The Undertaker was disqualified. The featured matches on the undercard included Kurt Angle versus Eddie Guerrero and Triple H versus Eugene.

== Production ==
=== Background ===
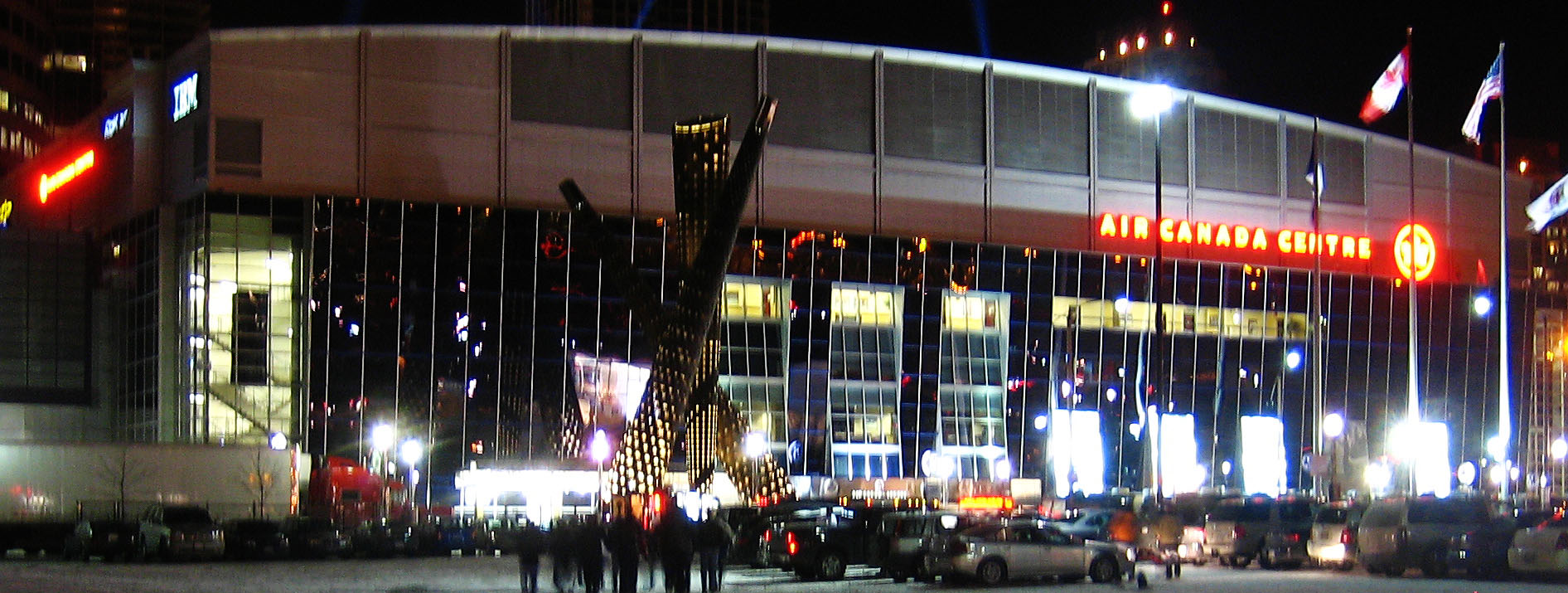
The event was held at the Air Canada Centre in Toronto, Ontario, Canada.

SummerSlam is an annual professional wrestling pay-per-view (PPV) event produced every August by the American promotion World Wrestling Entertainment (WWE) since 1988. Dubbed "The Biggest Party of the Summer", it is one of the promotion's original four pay-per-views, along with WrestleMania, Royal Rumble, and Survivor Series, referred to as the "Big Four". It has since become considered WWE's second biggest event of the year behind WrestleMania. The 17th SummerSlam was scheduled to be held on August 15, 2004, at the Air Canada Centre in Toronto, Ontario, Canada and featured wrestlers from the Raw and SmackDown! brands. The event was held during the 2004 Summer Olympics and it was the second SummerSlam to take place outside of the United States, after the 1992 event in London, England.

=== Storylines ===
The main feud heading into SummerSlam on the Raw brand was between Chris Benoit and Randy Orton, with the two feuding over the World Heavyweight Championship. At Vengeance, Benoit defeated Triple H to retain the title. On the July 26 episode of Raw, Orton won a 20-man battle royal, last eliminating Chris Jericho, to become the number one contender to the title at SummerSlam. Also that night, Benoit defeated Triple H in a 60-minute Iron Man match to retain the title with the help of Eugene. On the August 2 episode of Raw, Evolution (Orton, Batista, and Ric Flair) defeated Benoit, Edge, and Jericho in a six man tag team match when Orton pinned Benoit following an RKO. On the August 9 episode of Raw, Benoit defeated Orton and Triple H in a handicap match by disqualification.

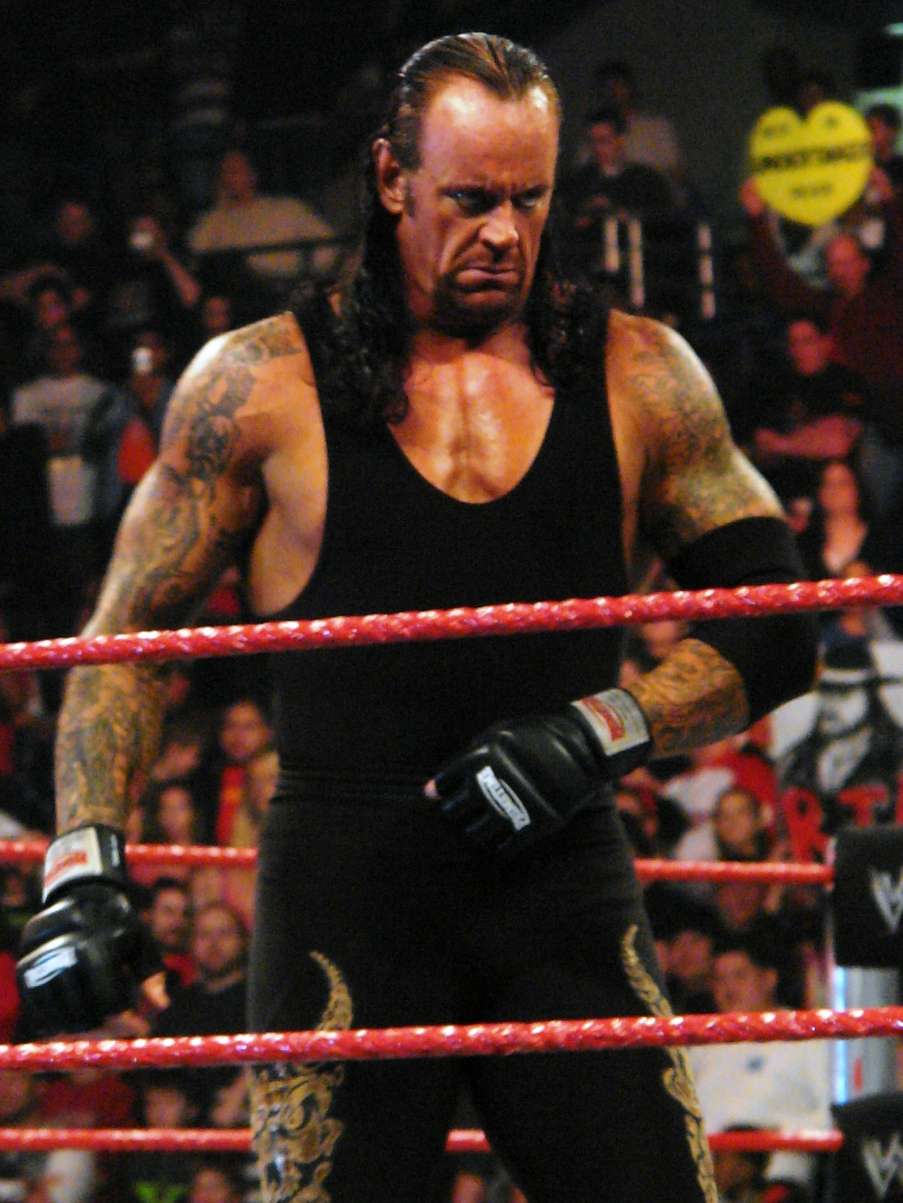
The Undertaker, who challenged John "Bradshaw" Layfield (JBL) for SmackDown!'s WWE Championship

The primary feud on the SmackDown! brand was between John "Bradshaw" Layfield (JBL) and The Undertaker, over the WWE Championship. JBL had won the title two months prior at The Great American Bash by defeating then-champion Eddie Guerrero in a Texas Bullrope match. On the July 22 episode of SmackDown!, JBL defeated a jobber to retain the title. After the match, The Undertaker came out and challenged JBL to a WWE Championship match at SummerSlam. On the August 5 episode of SmackDown!, as JBL called out The Undertaker, a midget wrestler came out and began to imitate the real Undertaker. The real Undertaker came out shortly afterwards and attacked JBL, until Orlando Jordan came out to help him. On the August 12 episode of SmackDown!, The Undertaker defeated Jordan by disqualification after JBL interfered and executed a Clothesline from Hell on The Undertaker.

The secondary feud on the SmackDown! brand was between Kurt Angle and Eddie Guerrero. The feud first started at WrestleMania XX, when Guerrero defeated Angle to successfully retain the WWE Championship. Guerrero lost the title to John "Bradshaw" Layfield (JBL) at The Great American Bash, when Angle, then-SmackDown! General Manager, screwed Guerrero and declared JBL the winner. On the July 15 episode of SmackDown!, JBL defeated Guerrero in a Steel Cage match to retain the title. Towards the end of the match, El Gran Luchadore (portrayed by Angle) interfered, giving JBL enough time to escape the cage and win the match. After the match ended, Guerrero attacked El Gran Luchadore and pulled off his mask, revealing him to be Angle. On the July 22 episode of SmackDown!, Vince McMahon fired Angle as SmackDown! General Manager and scheduled a match between Angle and Guerrero for SummerSlam.

The secondary feud on the Raw brand was between Triple H and Eugene. The feud first started on the May 17 episode of Raw, during an in-ring segment with The Rock, Eugene revealed that his favorite wrestler was in fact Triple H due to Eugene's adoration of "playing games". Capitalizing on this opportunity, Triple H began to befriend the star-struck and naive Eugene even making the young wrestler an honorary member of Triple H's stable Evolution. However, Triple H soon revealed that this was all a calculated ploy and that he planned to utilize Eugene to help him win back the World Heavyweight Championship from Chris Benoit. Yet, Triple H's plan failed miserably when during his title match with Benoit at Vengeance, Eugene inadvertently hit him with a steel chair costing him the match and the championship. On the July 12 episode of Raw, Triple H attacked Eugene in the ring after falsely implying that he had forgiven him for what happened at Vengeance. On the July 26 episode, Eugene would return to exact a degree of revenge by costing Triple H his rematch with Benoit. On the August 2 episode, Triple H demanded a match between the two at SummerSlam, to which Raw General Manager Eric Bischoff agreed.

== Event ==
Other on-screen personnel
Role:	Name:
English commentators	Jim Ross (Raw)
English commentators	Jerry Lawler (Raw)
English commentators	Michael Cole (SmackDown!)
English commentators	Tazz (SmackDown!)
Spanish commentators	Carlos Cabrera
Spanish commentators	Hugo Savinovich
Interviewers	Jonathan Coachman
Interviewers	Todd Grisham
Ring announcer	Lilian Garcia (Raw)
Ring announcer	Howard Finkel (Main Event)
Ring announcer	Tony Chimel (SmackDown!)
Referees	Mike Chioda (Raw)
Referees	Chad Patton (Raw)
Referees	Jack Doan (Raw)
Referees	Earl Hebner (Raw)
Referees	Jim Korderas (SmackDown!)
Referees	Nick Patrick (SmackDown!)
Referees	Charles Robinson (SmackDown!)

=== Preliminary matches ===
Before the event went live on pay-per-view, Rob Van Dam defeated René Duprée in a match taped for Sunday Night Heat. The first match was a six-man tag team match between The Dudleys (Bubba Ray Dudley, D-Von Dudley, and Spike Dudley) and the team of Rey Mysterio, Billy Kidman, and Paul London. Spike pinned Kidman after a 3D from Bubba Ray and D-Von to win the match for his team.

The next match was between Kane and Matt Hardy in a "Till Death To Us Part" match. Hardy gained control over Kane after performing a Twist of Fate on Kane outside the ring and attacking him with the ring bell. Kane then countered a suplex attempt by Hardy into a chokeslam from the top rope to win the match. As a result of the pre-match stipulation, Lita was forced to marry Kane, as part of their on-going storyline.

The third match was between John Cena and Booker T in the first match of a "Best of 5 series" for the WWE United States Championship. Early in the match, Cena gained the advantage over Booker T. In the end, Booker T performed a scissors kick on Cena, who retaliated by performing an FU to win the match and go up 1-0 in the series.

The following match was a Triple Threat match for the WWE Intercontinental Championship involving Edge, Batista and Chris Jericho. During the match, Edge and Jericho performed double-team maneuvers onto Batista. Edge performed a spear on Jericho to retain the title.

The fifth match was between Kurt Angle and Eddie Guerrero. Angle gained control over Guerrero early on in the match. Mid-match, the referee was knocked out, and as a result, Guerrero took his boot off and used it to hit both Angle and Luther Reigns, who was at ringside with Angle and tried to get involved in the match. The match concluded when Angle was able to counter a frog splash and forced Guerrero to submit to the Ankle Lock.

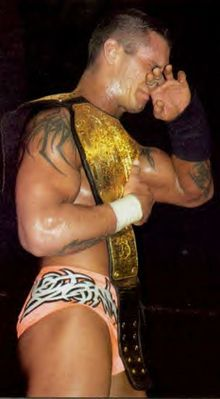
In winning Raw's World Heavyweight Championship at SummerSlam, a 24-year-old Randy Orton became the youngest world champion in WWE history

The next match was between Triple H and Eugene. At the start of the match, Triple H pretended to attack the ring announcer, Lilian Garcia, as a distraction to attack Eugene. Eugene countered Triple H's attacks by executing a Rock Bottom. During the match, Ric Flair attempted to interfere but he was ejected by the referee. As Flair was leaving from ringside, William Regal hit Flair with a pair of brass knuckles. Triple H performed a Pedigree on Eugene to win the match.

=== Main event matches ===
The following match was for the WWE Championship between John "Bradshaw" Layfield (JBL) and The Undertaker. Immediately, JBL and The Undertaker started the match outside the ring. Mid-match, the referee was knocked out. Orlando Jordan passed JBL the title belt, which JBL used to hit The Undertaker with. The Undertaker was disqualified after the referee saw him hit JBL with the title belt, meaning JBL retained the title. The Undertaker executed a chokeslam to JBL through the roof of JBL's limousine, leading to JBL being taken out of the arena on a stretcher.

The main event was between Chris Benoit and Randy Orton for the World Heavyweight Championship. Orton attempted to apply a Sharpshooter on Benoit but Benoit applied a Sharpshooter on Orton. Later in the match, Benoit performed seven German suplexes on Orton but Orton blocked a diving headbutt. In the end, Benoit attempted to apply the Crippler Crossface but Orton countered into an RKO to win the title. At the age of 24, Orton became the youngest world champion in WWE history, a record previously held by Brock Lesnar when he won the WWE Championship at 25. Following the match while Orton was celebrating his victory, Benoit returned to the ring and offered Orton a handshake, telling him to "be a man", which Orton accepted.

== Aftermath ==
On the August 16 episode of Raw, Randy Orton celebrated his win and was given a standing ovation by the crowd with golden balloons and confetti dropping into the arena. He thanked the crowd and proclaimed that the "Orton era has begun". Later on in the night, he defeated Chris Benoit in a rematch to retain the World Heavyweight Championship. After the match, Evolution (Batista, Ric Flair, and Triple H), threw Orton a mock celebration, only to reveal that they were not pleased with his new victory. While Batista had Orton propped on his shoulders, Triple H gave him a pleased thumbs up, but abruptly changed it to a thumbs-down. He then told Batista to drop Orton to the mat, and Flair and Batista attacked Orton as Triple H told him that he was nothing without Evolution, and decided that Orton was on his own. On the August 23 episode of Raw, Triple H told Orton to give him the title or "pay the price". Orton refused, and then he spat in Triple H's face and hit him with the title belt turning Orton into a face. Raw General Manager Eric Bischoff then scheduled a match between Orton and Triple H for the title at Unforgiven. At Unforgiven, Orton lost the title when he was pinned by Triple H.

The feud between John "Bradshaw" Layfield (JBL) and The Undertaker continued. The next few weeks on SmackDown!, JBL wore a neck brace, to signify that he was recuperating from The Undertaker's chokeslam. On the August 26 episode of SmackDown!, Orlando Jordan defended the WWE Championship for JBL against The Undertaker. The Undertaker won the match via disqualification following interference from JBL; as a result, JBL retained the title. The following week on SmackDown!, General Manager Theodore Long scheduled a Last Ride match at No Mercy between JBL and The Undertaker. At No Mercy, JBL retained the title after interference by Heidenreich.

== Results ==
No.	Results	Stipulations	Times
1^{H}	Rob Van Dam defeated René Duprée by pinfall	Singles match	6:07
2	The Dudley Boyz (Bubba Ray, D-Von, and Spike) defeated Rey Mysterio, Billy Kidman, and Paul London by pinfall	Six-man tag team match	8:06
3	Kane defeated Matt Hardy by pinfall	"Till Death Do Us Part" match Since Kane won, Lita had to marry Kane.	6:08
4	John Cena defeated Booker T (c) by pinfall	Singles match for the WWE United States Championship; First in the best of five series	6:25
5	Edge (c) defeated Batista and Chris Jericho by pinfall	Triple threat match for the WWE Intercontinental Championship	8:24
6	Kurt Angle (with Luther Reigns) defeated Eddie Guerrero by submission	Singles match	13:38
7	Triple H defeated Eugene by pinfall	Singles match	14:06
8	John "Bradshaw" Layfield (c) (with Orlando Jordan) defeated The Undertaker by disqualification	Singles match for the WWE Championship	17:37
9	Randy Orton defeated Chris Benoit (c) by pinfall	Singles match for the World Heavyweight Championship	20:08
(c) / – the champion(s) heading into the match; H / – the match was broadcast prior to the pay-per-view on Sunday Night Heat

== See also ==
- Professional wrestling in Canada
