= WrestleMania XX =

2004 World Wrestling Entertainment pay-per-view event

- Promotional poster
- Promotion: World Wrestling Entertainment
- Brand(s): Raw; SmackDown!
- Date: March 14, 2004
- City: New York City, New York
- Venue: Madison Square Garden
- Attendance: 20,000
- Buy rate: 1,020,000
- Tagline: Where It All Begins... Again.

Pay-per-view chronology
← Previous; No Way Out	Next → Backlash

WrestleMania chronology
← Previous; XIX	Next → 21

WrestleMania XX was a 2004 professional wrestling pay-per-view (PPV) event produced by World Wrestling Entertainment (WWE), held for wrestlers from the promotion's Raw and SmackDown! brand divisions. It was the 20th annual WrestleMania and took place on March 14, 2004, from Madison Square Garden in the New York City borough of Manhattan, New York.

This was the third WrestleMania at Madison Square Garden, after WrestleMania I in 1985 and WrestleMania X in 1994, and the fourth of six WrestleManias in the New York metropolitan area, including WrestleMania 2 in 1986, WrestleMania 29 in 2013, and WrestleMania 35 in 2019. It was also the last WrestleMania at Madison Square Garden as WWE began to run only stadiums for the annual event beginning with WrestleMania 23 in 2007, excluding WrestleMania 36 in 2020, which was held at the WWE Performance Center behind closed doors due to the COVID-19 pandemic. WrestleMania XX's calendar date of March 14 was the earliest date for a WrestleMania.

The match card featured two billed main events. The card's final match, which was the main event for the Raw brand, was a triple threat match for the World Heavyweight Championship, which saw champion Triple H defending the title against Shawn Michaels and that year's Royal Rumble match winner, Chris Benoit, who won the match, making Triple H submit via the Crippler Crossface, resulting in his first and only world championship in WWE. The main event for the SmackDown! brand featured Eddie Guerrero versus Kurt Angle for the WWE Championship, which Guerrero won by a Small Package pin. The event also featured the return of The Undertaker in his Deadman persona, who defeated Kane after a Tombstone Piledriver. John Cena made his in-ring WrestleMania debut at the event, defeating Big Show to win his first title in WWE, the WWE United States Championship.

Also on the card was a match between Goldberg and Brock Lesnar with "Stone Cold" Steve Austin as the special guest referee. This was both Lesnar's and Goldberg's final match in WWE until Extreme Rules 2012 and Survivor Series 2016, respectively. After Goldberg won the match following a Jackhammer, both men were given a Stone Cold Stunner by Austin on their way out. The event also featured the in-ring return of The Rock, teaming up with Mick Foley and reuniting the Rock 'n' Sock Connection to take on Evolution (Randy Orton, Batista, and Ric Flair) in a 3-on-2 Handicap match, in which Evolution were victorious. This would be The Rock's final match in WWE until Survivor Series 2011.

The event grossed US$2.4 million in ticket sales, making the pay-per-view the highest grossing event ever for WWE at Madison Square Garden. More than 20,000 people from 16 countries and 48 U.S. states attended the event, which was also televised in more than 90 countries. The event generated an estimated $13.5 million of economic activity for New York City and created an equivalent of 96 full-year jobs.

== Production ==
=== Background ===
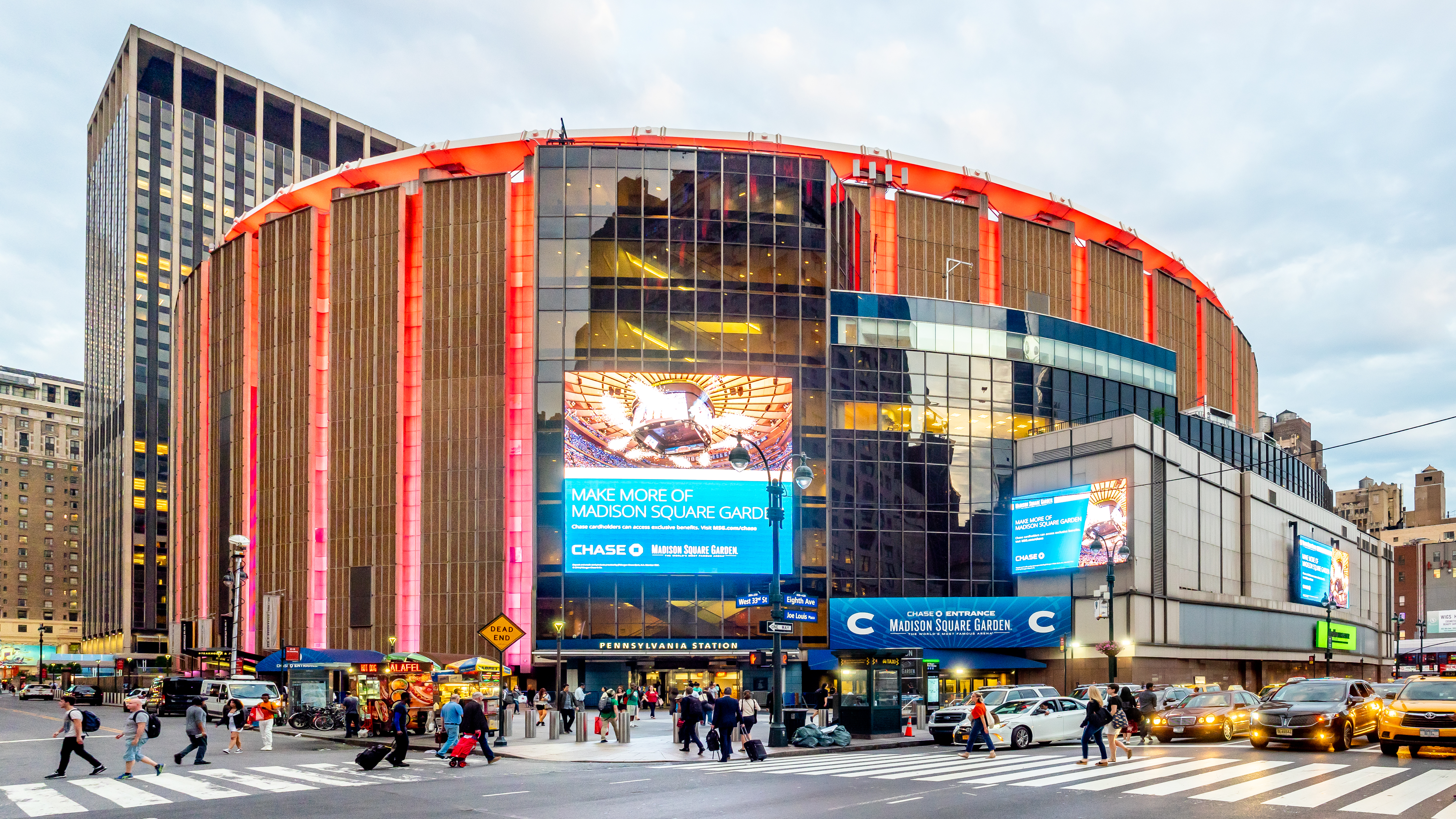
This was the third and final WrestleMania held at Madison Square Garden in New York City, New York, after WrestleMania I in 1985 and WrestleMania X in 1994. Beginning with WrestleMania 23 in 2007, WrestleMania would only be held in stadiums going forward.

WrestleMania is considered World Wrestling Entertainment's (WWE) flagship professional wrestling pay-per-view (PPV) event, having first been held in 1985. It has become the longest-running professional wrestling event in history and is held annually between mid-March to mid-April. It was the first of WWE's original four pay-per-views, which includes Royal Rumble, SummerSlam, and Survivor Series, referred to as the "Big Four". WrestleMania XX was scheduled to be held on March 14, 2004, from Madison Square Garden (MSG) in the New York City borough of Manhattan, New York, which was the third WrestleMania at MSG, after WrestleMania I in 1985 and WrestleMania X in 1994. The event featured wrestlers from the Raw and SmackDown! brand divisions.

=== Storylines ===
The event comprised 12 matches that resulted from scripted storylines. Results were predetermined by WWE's writers on the Raw and SmackDown! brands, while storylines were produced on WWE's weekly television shows, Raw and SmackDown!.

The main feud heading into the pay-per-view was for the Raw brand, with Triple H, Shawn Michaels, and Chris Benoit feuding over the World Heavyweight Championship. The rivalry began on the December 29 episode of Raw, when Michaels challenged Triple H for the World Heavyweight Championship in Michaels' hometown of San Antonio, Texas. It appeared as if Michaels would win, with the then-Raw General Manager Eric Bischoff coming into the ring at the last minute and making the pinfall, counting to three for what appeared to be Michaels winning the title. However, as Michaels' shoulders were on the mat at the same time as Triple H's, the match was later declared a draw and Triple H retained the championship. At the Royal Rumble, Triple H and Michaels again faced each other in a Last Man Standing match for the title, which resulted in another draw. As a result, Triple H retained the title yet again, but leaving open the question as to which of the two truly deserved the championship. Later that night, during the Royal Rumble match, SmackDown!'s Benoit won the match by last eliminating Big Show, after being the first entrant to the event (a feat that at the time had only been achieved by Shawn Michaels). The following night on Raw, Michaels and Triple H were involved in an in-ring confrontation when Raw's Sheriff "Stone Cold" Steve Austin made his way to the ring. He stated that although Michaels should have a rematch, he had to "enforce the law" and that even though the Royal Rumble rules gave the winner of the match a shot at "the (world) championship", there was not any specification as to which world title that was. Benoit, who at the time was a member of the SmackDown! brand then came to the ring and said he was taking advantage of the loophole, joining the Raw brand and challenging Triple H for the World Heavyweight Championship at WrestleMania XX. On the February 9 episode of Raw, a contract signing took place between Benoit and Triple H. As Triple H signed his name on the paper, Michaels came out to inform Benoit that the last thing he wanted to do is "rain on [his] parade". He then stated that he, more than anybody, can respect Benoit's effort to win the Royal Rumble match and earn a World title shot, but suggested that Benoit should've stayed on SmackDown! to take care of business while Michaels himself, was trying to finish his feud with Triple H. Benoit refused to relinquish his guaranteed title shot, resulting in Michaels hitting Benoit with Sweet Chin Music and signing the contract himself. After the two men wrestled a match marred by interference from the champion on the February 16 episode of Raw, Austin decided to make Triple H's title defense a triple threat match. On the March 1 episode of Raw, after Michaels and Benoit lost to Randy Orton and Batista, Triple H's stablemates in Evolution, the entire group attacked Michaels and Benoit, ending with Triple H hitting both with the Pedigree and rubbing his World title belt into their faces while they lied motionless in the ring.

The main feud for the SmackDown! brand was between Eddie Guerrero and Kurt Angle for the WWE Championship. Angle and Guerrero were initially allies while Guerrero feuded with his nephew Chavo Guerrero. This changed when on the January 29 episode of SmackDown!, Guerrero last eliminated Angle in a 15-man Royal Rumble match, to earn a shot at the WWE Championship. At No Way Out, Kurt Angle defeated The Big Show and John Cena in a triple threat match to earn a title shot at WrestleMania and Guerrero defeated Brock Lesnar for the WWE Championship. On the February 19 episode of SmackDown!, Angle was the special guest referee in a WWE Championship match between Eddie Guerrero and Chavo Guerrero. As Eddie was about to gain the victory, Angle stopped the 3-count and turned on Guerrero. On the February 26 episode of SmackDown!, Guerrero was eager to get his revenge on Angle, but when he finally saw Angle, he shoved SmackDown! General Manager Paul Heyman and his assistant Dawn Marie out of his way, only for Heyman to have Guerrero escorted out of the arena by security. Guerrero was scheduled to team with John Cena to take on Chavo Guerrero and the Big Show in a tag team match that night, but due to Guerrero being escorted out of the arena, he was replaced by Rey Mysterio for the tag match, which Mysterio and Cena won. Later that night, Angle appeared and stated that he attacked Guerrero for the SmackDown! fans and for WWE. He then referred to Guerrero as a former drug addict who should not represent SmackDown! as the WWE Champion and stated that one day, people would be thanking him for giving them a champion to be proud of. Guerrero then re-entered the arena and assaulted Angle until he was arrested on the orders of Heyman. As Guerrero got taken out of the building in handcuffs, Angle made some insulting comments to him, before the officers drove away with Guerrero in the police car. On the March 4 episode of SmackDown!, during Guerrero's match with Heyman (while he was handcuffed), Angle interfered and knocked him down a few times, until Guerrero defended himself by spitting on Angle. As Guerrero begged Angle to hit him with the WWE Championship belt, Angle did so and raised the title belt over his head to hype their match at Wrestlemania XX.

This was the first WrestleMania to have matches billed as "inter-promotional", which means that a party from Raw would wrestle a party from SmackDown!. WWE owner Vince McMahon named three matches to be inter-promotional on the February 16 episode of Raw. The first was a tag team match featuring SmackDown!'s Torrie Wilson and Sable, who had recently been featured in a pictorial in Playboy magazine, against Raw's Stacy Keibler and Miss Jackie, who had protested the decision made by Hugh Hefner not to feature them in his magazine.

On the January 26 episode of Raw, Goldberg came to the ring and demanded a match between himself and Brock Lesnar, with whom he had problems over the past two months. At the Royal Rumble, Goldberg was entered in the Royal Rumble match, only to have Lesnar (who as the reigning WWE Champion, was not entered into the match) interfere and execute an F-5, causing Goldberg to be eliminated by Kurt Angle. On the February 2 episode of Raw, as a result of the rivalry between the two wrestlers, Sheriff Steve Austin gave Goldberg the option of attending No Way Out by giving him a front-row ticket. At No Way Out, Goldberg was seen arriving at the arena and being escorted to his front seat by security. SmackDown! General Manager Paul Heyman then gave a promotional in-ring speech on how SmackDown! was the better program than Raw. Lesnar then came down to the ring to promote his match and to insult Goldberg. Goldberg immediately jumped over the barricade and entered the ring, where Lesnar performed a running shoulder block to Goldberg's stomach and tried to perform another F-5 on him. However, Goldberg countered it and lifted Lesnar vertically in the air before slamming him down in a Jackhammer. Goldberg was then escorted out of the arena by security. During Lesnar's WWE title defense against Eddie Guerrero later that night, Goldberg returned to the arena and interfered by executing a Spear, which caused Lesnar to lose the title after Guerrero nailed him with a Frog splash. On the February 23 episode of Raw, Vince McMahon set the interpromotional singles match as pitting Lesnar versus Goldberg for WrestleMania XX, with Austin as the special guest referee. Later that night during the match between McMahon and Eric Bischoff, Lesnar appeared and nailed Austin with an F-5 before stealing Austin's four-wheeler. On the February 26 episode of SmackDown!, Lesnar stated that he appeared on Raw just to get back at Austin for giving Goldberg the front-row seat ticket and suggesting that Goldberg would attack Lesnar at No Way Out. Behind the scenes, it was widely known that the match would be Goldberg's last in WWE. Only a week before WrestleMania, rumors surfaced that Lesnar too was leaving, in order to pursue a career in the National Football League. On the March 11 episode of SmackDown!, Austin appeared to get his four-wheeler back from Lesnar, only for the entire roster to get in his way by orders of SmackDown! General Manager Heyman. Moments later, the entire roster decided to move aside and let Austin by to confront Lesnar in the ring. As Austin got into the ring, he and Lesnar traded punches, with Austin ramming Lesnar headfirst into the steel ring post and attempting to nail Lesnar with the Stone Cold Stunner, only for Lesnar to escape, leaving Austin to finally get back his four-wheeler and close the show with his trademark beer bash.

The next match was at the request of Kane and had its roots in a match at Survivor Series, in which Kane's storyline brother, The Undertaker challenged Vince McMahon to a Buried Alive match. Kane interfered in the match and buried his brother under several tons of dirt, apparently killing him. On the November 20 episode of SmackDown!, Kane appeared to give the eulogy for his brother, claiming that The Undertaker was no longer his brother and had died a long time before, as he no longer embraced his dark side. This rewarded him with a match for the World Heavyweight Championship at Armageddon, which was won by Triple H in a Triple Threat Match also involving Goldberg. Kane participated in the Royal Rumble and was eliminated by Booker T when The Undertaker's old theme music began playing and distracted him. Over the following weeks, Kane repeatedly insisted that The Undertaker was "dead", only to be met with various paranormal incidents, such as a rainstorm over the ramp on which he stood. On the March 8 episode of Raw, Kane appeared in the ring and saw an empty casket; as he opened it, he saw an urn inside of it. He then grabbed the microphone and stated that it was going to take more than an empty casket and an urn to intimidate him. He then stated that The Undertaker's legacy, his 11–0 WrestleMania streak and his life, was coming to an end. As Kane said that he was not afraid of The Undertaker, the lights went out, and the ring was lifted off the ground with Kane standing in it and tilted sideways, which would be the final message sent from The Undertaker before their match at WrestleMania XX.

A rivalry had been simmering for some time between Mick Foley and Randy Orton. On the June 23 episode of Raw, following an on-air ceremony honoring Foley for his achievements, Orton and Ric Flair attacked him backstage and threw him down a flight of stairs. Foley returned as the replacement for Steve Austin as Raw co-general manager and gave himself a shot at Orton's Intercontinental Championship on the December 15 episode of Raw, but he walked out of the match and would not face Orton, even after Orton spat on him. On the January 19 episode of Raw, a furious Austin declared that Foley would be entered in the Royal Rumble match and be expected to return and wrestle, which he did by eliminating Orton (and himself) from the match. On the March 1 episode of Raw, Foley was later joined by The Rock in the feud, and the re-formed Rock 'n' Sock Connection challenged Orton, Batista, and Flair to a handicap tag team match at WrestleMania.

== Event ==
=== Preliminary matches ===
Other on-screen personnel
Role:	Name:
English commentators	Jim Ross (Raw)
English commentators	Jerry Lawler (Raw)
English commentators	Michael Cole (SmackDown!)
English commentators	Tazz (SmackDown!)
Spanish commentators	Carlos Cabrera
Spanish commentators	Hugo Savinovich
Interviewer	Lilian Garcia
Ring announcers	Tony Chimel (SmackDown!)
Ring announcers	Howard Finkel (Raw)
Referees	Charles Robinson (SmackDown!)
Referees	Nick Patrick (SmackDown!)
Referees	Jim Korderas (SmackDown!)
Referees	Brian Hebner (SmackDown!)
Referees	Mike Chioda (Raw)
Referees	Chad Patton (Raw)
Referees	Earl Hebner (Raw)
Referees	Jack Doan (Raw)
Referees	Tim White (Raw)
Referees	"Stone Cold" Steve Austin (Goldberg vs. Brock Lesnar)

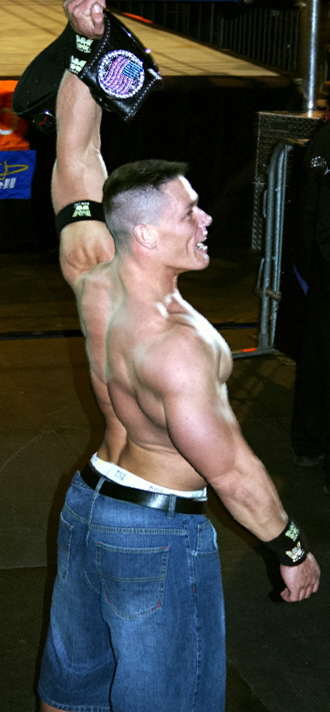
John Cena made his first title win at this event, defeating Big Show for SmackDown!'s United States Championship.

WrestleMania XX began with the Boys Choir of Harlem singing "America the Beautiful". The first match that aired was a singles match between Big Show and John Cena for the WWE United States Championship, the first time the title was ever defended at the event. The match began with Big Show beating down Cena, who then came back, executing an FU for a near-fall against Big Show. Cena grabbed his signature chain and tried to attack Big Show with it. However, the referee saw the chain and confiscated it due to its being illegal in the match. With the referee distracted, Cena hit Big Show with hidden brass knuckles and executed another FU to win the match and the title.

The next match was a fatal four-way tag team match – involving Rob Van Dam and Booker T, Garrison Cade and Mark Jindrak, the Dudley Boyz (Bubba Ray Dudley and D-Von Dudley), and La Résistance (René Duprée and Rob Conway) – for the World Tag Team Championship. The match saw quick action between all four teams, and ended when Conway was pinned by Van Dam after Booker T performed a scissor kick on him, which was then followed by Van Dam's Five-Star Frog Splash, leading to the two retaining the titles.

The third match was between Christian and Chris Jericho. The match centered around both men furiously attacking each other. Christian won the match after Jericho's love interest, Trish Stratus attacked Jericho thinking he was Christian, allowing Christian to roll him up for the win. Following the match, Stratus turned on Jericho and slapped him several times, allowing Christian to perform the Unprettier on Jericho. This was the last match officiated by referee Tim White, who retired after this event.

Next up was a handicap match featuring Evolution (Randy Orton, Batista, and Ric Flair) against the Rock 'n' Sock Connection (The Rock and Mick Foley). Evolution won the match when Orton pinned Foley after executing an RKO.

"Mean" Gene Okerlund then introduced the WWE Hall of Fame Class of 2004. This was followed by the inter-promotional Playboy Evening Gown match between the team of Torrie Wilson and Sable against Stacy Keibler and Miss Jackie, where both teams wore lingerie. Wilson and Sable won after Wilson pinned Jackie with a roll up.

The next match was a Cruiserweight Open for the Cruiserweight Championship. Último Dragón and Shannon Moore started the match, with Dragón getting a pinfall victory after a Dragon-DDT, but was then forced to submit by Jamie Noble, with a Dragon Sleeper, who next eliminated Funaki in 8 seconds. Nunzio was then in the match, but was eliminated after being counted out of the match when he was unable to return to the ring by the referee's count of ten. Billy Kidman then entered the match, pinning and eliminating Noble, following a top rope BK-Bomb. Kidman was then pinned and eliminated by Rey Mysterio with a Sunset Flip Powerbomb from the top rope. Tajiri was the next entrant, but was also pinned by Mysterio, following a Victory Roll. Akio was the next scheduled entrant but was unable to compete, due to being inadvertently attacked by Tajiri with his signature green mist that he spat out of his mouth when Mysterio ducked. The Cruiserweight Champion, Chavo Guerrero, was the final entrant; and he pinned Mysterio with a reversal of Mysterio's Sunset Flip to win with the assistance of his father Chavo Classic, thus retaining the title. This was the last time in WrestleMania that the Cruiserweight Championship was defended.

The seventh match featured Brock Lesnar and Goldberg, with special guest referee "Stone Cold" Steve Austin. The beginning of the match began with both men staring each other down, jawing back and forth, with no physical action for several minutes, causing an exasperated Austin at one point to coax them into locking up. The fact that they both were leaving WWE immediately after the match, as well as the lack of effort brought forth by both Goldberg and Lesnar, drew large heat from the fans throughout the match, with fans chanting, "You sold out", the chorus of Steam's "Na Na Na Hey Hey Kiss Him Goodbye", "Austin", "This match sucks", "We want Bret", "Boring", "Goldberg sucks", and "Hogan". Goldberg then executed a Spear on Lesnar for a near-fall. Lesnar then executed the F-5 on Goldberg for a near-fall. Afterward, Lesnar tried to use Goldberg's signature spear on him and missed, hitting the ring post, allowing Goldberg to execute another spear and a Jackhammer for the victory. After the match, Lesnar responded to the fans' criticism by gesturing his middle finger, seemingly at the crowd, but which was actually directed towards Vince McMahon, and to Austin. Austin then executed a Stone Cold Stunner on both competitors, to the crowd's delight, and celebrated with beer in the ring.

The next match was another four-way tag team match for the WWE Tag Team Championship, involving Rikishi and Scotty 2 Hotty versus the APA (Bradshaw and Faarooq), the Basham Brothers (Doug Basham and Danny Basham), and the World's Greatest Tag Team (Shelton Benjamin and Charlie Haas). Rikishi and Scotty retained the title after Rikishi pinned Danny with a Banzai Drop.

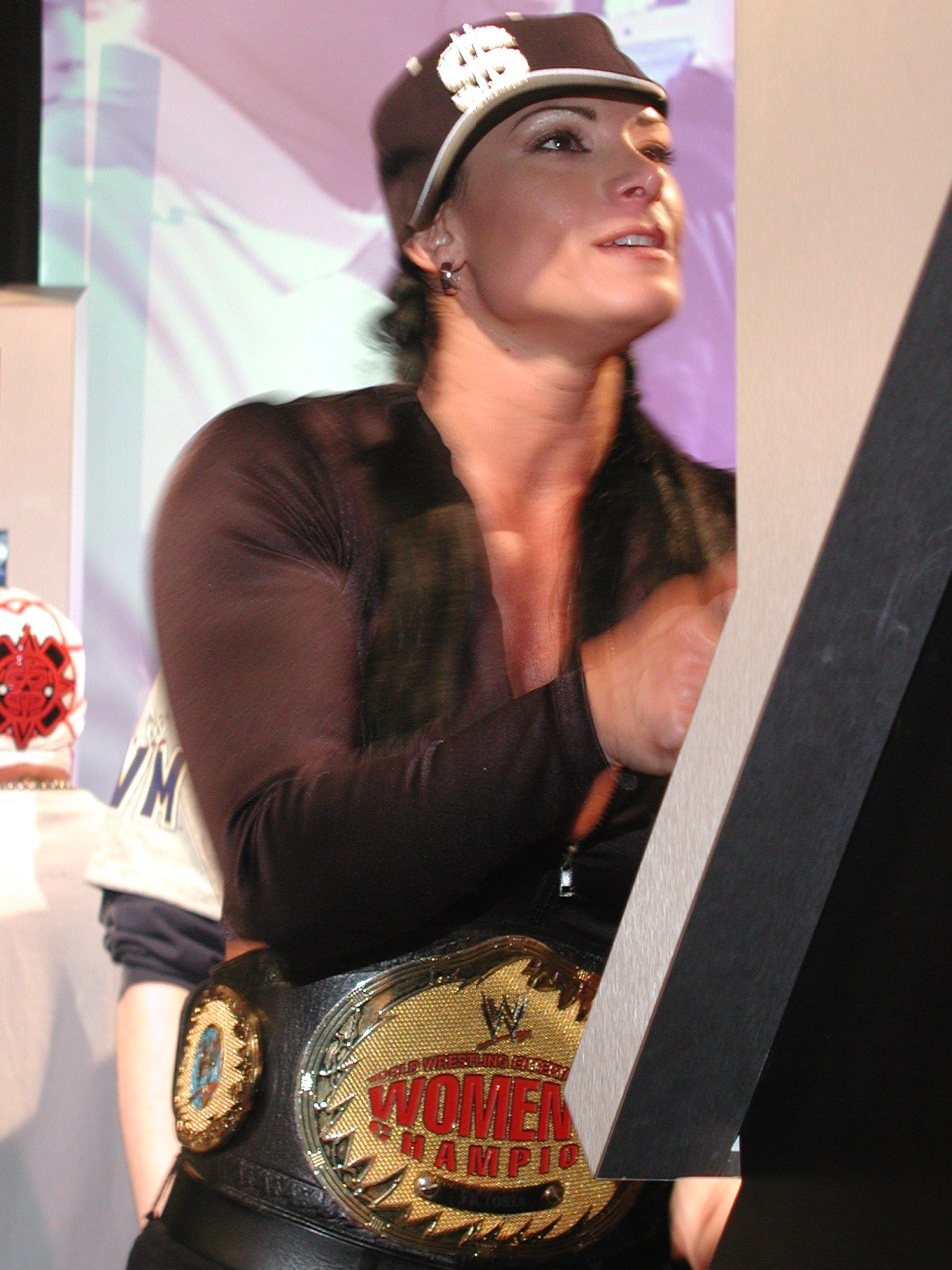
Victoria as Raw's WWE Women's Champion entering the event

The ninth match was between Victoria and Molly Holly for the WWE Women's Championship, where Holly would have her hair shaved if she lost. Victoria would counter a Widow's peak attempt by Holly into a backslide pin to win the match and retain the WWE Women's Championship. Holly tried running towards the backstage area to escape the match's stipulation, but was eventually stopped by Victoria, who would knock her out and shave her bald.

=== Main event matches ===
The 10th match of the night was for the WWE Championship, between the champion Eddie Guerrero and the challenger Kurt Angle. The match began with both men maneuvering on the mat. Guerrero then performed a DDT and Frog Splash on Angle that would result in a pin attempt. Angle then recovered and applied an ankle lock, but Guerrero escaped the hold by rolling through it and throwing Angle out of the ring. As Angle was outside, Guerrero loosened his own boot. When Angle returned to the ring, he tried to apply the hold again. This time, Guerrero pushed Angle off with his other foot and allowed his boot to come off and thus break free from Angle's hold. With Angle confused, Guerrero pinned Angle with a roll-up with his feet on the ropes to win the match and retain the WWE Championship.

The 11th match of the event was the encounter between The Undertaker and Kane. After Kane made his entrance, he was seen looking toward the entrance ramp saying, "You're not coming back tonight. You're not coming back, I buried you alive." After this, the lights in the arena went out and Paul Bearer, The Undertaker's former manager and Kane's (storyline) father, was heard screaming "Oh, yes!". Blue light began to fill the arena as Bearer, carrying The Undertaker's former trademark urn, led a group of Druids, all chanting and carrying torches, onto the entrance ramp. As the Druids made a formation at the top of the ramp, Bearer walked to ringside, turned and said to Kane, "My son... You're no son of mine." He then turned back to face the entryway and raised the urn to summon The Undertaker. As Kane continued to watch in the ring, refusing to believe his brother was back, The Undertaker entered the arena in his "Deadman" persona, wearing a long black trenchcoat and hat, and walked through the Druid formation. Bearer met him at ringside and directed him to the ring steps, where The Undertaker raised his arms to bring the arena lights back up. Before the match officially got underway, a now visibly shaken and distressed Kane began shouting at his brother repeatedly, saying things like "I killed you!", "I buried you alive!", and "You're not real!", while The Undertaker simply stood staring stoically at Kane. Eventually, Kane decided to see if The Undertaker was indeed standing in front of him by slowly inching forward with his hand outstretched. The Undertaker responded by punching Kane, knocking him down; and the match got underway. The two continued brawling until Kane delivered a Chokeslam to The Undertaker, who sat up shortly afterward while Kane was taunting Paul Bearer. The Undertaker then retaliated with a Chokeslam of his own and a Tombstone piledriver to win the match and remain undefeated at WrestleMania with a 12–0 record.

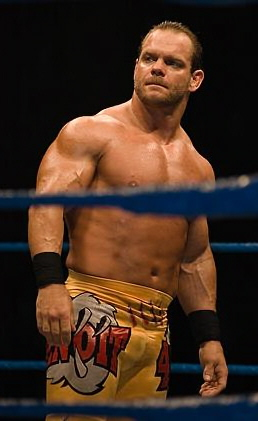
Chris Benoit, one of the challengers for Raw's World Heavyweight Championship in the main event

The main event was a triple threat match for the World Heavyweight Championship between Chris Benoit, Shawn Michaels, and champion Triple H. The match started with Benoit and Michaels wanting to face Triple H, but would wrestle each other to try and gain an advantage, before Triple H's intervention led to the match going back-and-forth between all three men, performing their signature holds and maneuvers throughout. Benoit soon gained control over Michaels when he applied the Crippler Crossface. As Michaels was about to submit, Triple H saved the match, attacking both men. Triple H and Michaels then teamed up to suplex Benoit through a broadcast table. Triple H performed the Pedigree on Michaels and Benoit broke up a pinfall. Michaels then attempted Sweet Chin Music on Benoit, who countered it by throwing Michaels out of the ring. As this occurred, Triple H again attempted to execute a Pedigree on Benoit, but Benoit countered and applied the Crippler Crossface, with Triple H submitting, making it the first time ever that a WrestleMania main event ended in a submission. As a result, Benoit won the match and the World Heavyweight Championship, crying tears of joy. After the match, Eddie Guerrero came to the ring and the two champions embraced while confetti showered down as the event ended.

== Reception ==
WrestleMania XX was met with a generally mixed-to-positive critical reception. Robert Leighty Jr. of 411Mania gave the event an overall score of 7.3 out of 10.0 and noted that:

This is a very long show with a lot of filler to get as many people as possible involved, but the Main Matches all delivered in some way. The 2 Main Title matches were fantastic, and the handicap match was a blast. You throw in a strong Jericho/Christian match and the unique crowd response of Goldberg/Lesnar and you have a strong WrestleMania. Not the greatest ever thanks to a mediocre run in the middle, but a good show that could have been better.

The triple threat match between Shawn Michaels, Chris Benoit, and Triple H for the World Heavyweight Championship received critical acclaim, with many wrestling publications and websites calling this match one of the greatest wrestling matches of all time. Leighty wrote that the main event was, "The greatest three-way match in the history of professional wrestling. Everything was perfect about this match including the finish." The match was #2 on IGN's list of Top 20 Matches in WrestleMania History. However, due to the events surrounding the death of Chris Benoit, the match is rarely, if ever, mentioned by WWE.

John Powell of Canadian Online Explorer's professional wrestling section rated the entire event 4 out of 10 stars, which was a lower rating than he gave to the previous year's event. The Triple Threat match between Shawn Michaels, Chris Benoit, and Triple H for the World Heavyweight Championship receiving the highest rating of 7.5 out of 10 stars; the match between Eddie Guerrero and Kurt Angle for the WWE Championship was rated 7 out of 10 stars; the match between The Undertaker and Kane was rated 2 out of 10 stars; and the match between Bill Goldberg and Brock Lesnar received the lowest rating, 0 out of 10 stars.

The Goldberg–Lesnar match is widely considered one of the worst matches in WrestleMania history. Writing for Bleacher Report, Mike Krakalovich named it the 4th worst match in the history of the event. The match was also inducted into WrestleCrap.

== Aftermath ==
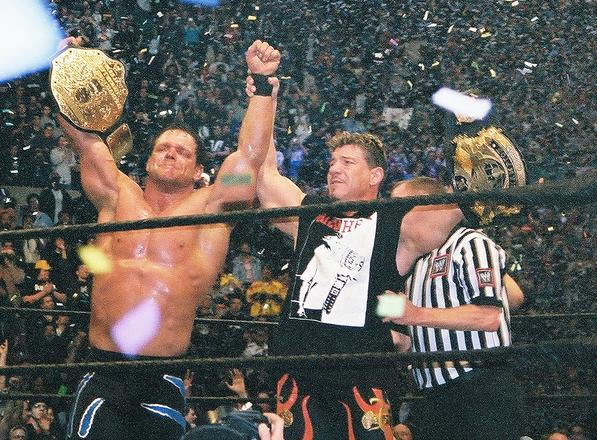
Chris Benoit and Eddie Guerrero walked out of WrestleMania XX as world champions.

Both Brock Lesnar and Goldberg left WWE after the event, but later returned (Lesnar in 2012 and Goldberg in 2016) and reignited their rivalry, including feuding for several months on social media and during promotional work for the WWE 2K17 video game, which featured Lesnar as the cover star and Goldberg as the pre-order bonus. This would set up a rematch between the two at the 2016 Survivor Series, which Goldberg won in one minute and 26 seconds. After Goldberg entered himself into the 2017 Royal Rumble match the next night on Raw, Lesnar's advocate Paul Heyman said that Lesnar would also be in the match after being embarrassed at Survivor Series; however, Goldberg eliminated Lesnar. Lesnar challenged Goldberg to a final match at WrestleMania 33 which Goldberg accepted. The match then became a championship match after Goldberg defeated Kevin Owens at Fastlane to win the Universal Championship. At WrestleMania 33, Lesnar defeated Goldberg to win the championship and end the feud.

At Backlash, the original main event match was between Chris Benoit and Shawn Michaels for the World Heavyweight Championship. Triple H appeared to be out of the picture, as the annual WWE Draft Lottery took place eight days after WrestleMania; and he was drafted to SmackDown!. Almost immediately after the draft lottery, Triple H was traded back to Raw; and on March 29 he demanded that the intended match at Backlash be changed to Benoit and Triple H for the World Heavyweight Championship. Raw general manager Eric Bischoff liked the idea of the match, but concluded that he had promised Michaels a World title match at Backlash. To solve this, Bischoff booked a return triple threat match to serve as the main event for Backlash. Benoit emerged victorious by submission for the second consecutive pay-per-view, this time forcing Michaels to submit to a Sharpshooter. Benoit went on to hold the title until August 2004, losing it to Randy Orton at SummerSlam.

The feud between Kurt Angle and Eddie Guerrero continued. Angle, however, went in for surgery on his neck shortly after WrestleMania and was not scheduled to return to action for some time. To cover this in storyline, Angle was made the on-screen General Manager of SmackDown! after previous General Manager Paul Heyman was drafted off the brand and promptly quit rather than work for his hated rival Bischoff. On the April 15 episode of SmackDown!, Angle's legitimate neck problems were further incorporated into the story by having Big Show chokeslam Angle off a ledge and render him crippled to the point where he could not walk without crutches and required a wheelchair. At The Great American Bash, Guerrero defended his title in a Texas Bull Rope match against John "Bradshaw" Layfield (JBL). The match ended with Guerrero appearing to have won, but Angle reversed the decision and awarded the match and WWE Championship to JBL.

Shortly after The Great American Bash, Angle interfered in a steel cage match for the WWE Championship between JBL and Guerrero on the July 15 episode of SmackDown! under the guise of a masked wrestler named "El Gran Luchador" and cost Guerrero the match, but was exposed by Guerrero. On the July 22 episode of SmackDown!, WWE Chairman Vince McMahon confronted Angle, who was still using crutches and the wheelchair, demanding his resignation for faking his handicap. When Angle would not do so, McMahon fired him and began attacking him with one of the crutches. McMahon saw that Angle was completely healthy as he fended off the attack and thus put him back on the active roster and ordered Angle to wrestle Guerrero at SummerSlam. Angle defeated Guerrero after he forced Guerrero to submit to the ankle lock. At Survivor Series their feud finally ended in a Four-on-Four Traditional Survivor Series Tag Team Match, with Guerrero's team (composed of Eddie Guerrero, The Big Show, Rob Van Dam, and John Cena) being victorious against Team Angle (composed of Kurt Angle, Luther Reigns, Mark Jindrak, and Carlito).

After WrestleMania XX, Trish Stratus teamed with Christian in a losing effort against Chris Jericho in a handicap match at Backlash. Elsewhere in the Divas Division, Victoria retained her WWE Women's Championship against Lita at the same event. On the SmackDown! side, Sable reverted to her heel persona and engaged in a short feud with Torrie Wilson.

Cactus Jack and Randy Orton continued their feud at Backlash, with Jack challenging Orton to a hardcore match for the Intercontinental Championship. Orton won after performing an RKO to slam Cactus Jack onto a barbed wire baseball bat.

After WrestleMania, Kane and The Undertaker went their separate ways. Before the year was out, both men would receive shots at their respective brands' top championships. Kane faced Chris Benoit at Bad Blood for the World Heavyweight Championship, while The Undertaker received multiple shots at John "Bradshaw" Layfield for the WWE Championship, the last of which came at Armageddon in December. Kane spent the rest of his time in a feud with Lita and Matt Hardy, which led to the debut of Gene Snitsky and a feud with him.

== Results ==
No.	Results	Stipulations	Times
1	John Cena defeated Big Show (c) by pinfall	Singles match for the WWE United States Championship	9:12
2	Rob Van Dam and Booker T (c) defeated Garrison Cade and Mark Jindrak, Dudley Boyz (Bubba Ray Dudley and D-Von Dudley) and La Résistance (René Duprée and Rob Conway) by pinfall	Fatal four-way tag team match for the World Tag Team Championship	7:52
3	Christian defeated Chris Jericho by pinfall	Singles match	14:43
4	Evolution (Randy Orton, Batista and Ric Flair) defeated Rock 'n' Sock Connection (The Rock and Mick Foley) by pinfall	3-on-2 Handicap match	17:01
5	Torrie Wilson and Sable defeated Miss Jackie and Stacy Keibler	Playboy Evening Gown Women's Tag Team match	2:33
6	Chavo Guerrero (c) (with Chavo Guerrero Sr.) defeated Akio, Billy Kidman, Funaki, Jamie Noble, Nunzio, Rey Mysterio, Shannon Moore, Tajiri and Último Dragón	Cruiserweight Open for the WWE Cruiserweight Championship	10:30
7	Goldberg defeated Brock Lesnar by pinfall	Singles match with "Stone Cold" Steve Austin as special guest referee	13:43
8	Too Cool (Rikishi and Scotty 2 Hotty) (c) defeated World's Greatest Tag Team (Shelton Benjamin and Charlie Haas), Basham Brothers (Doug Basham and Danny Basham) and The APA (Faarooq and Bradshaw) by pinfall	Fatal four-way tag team match for the WWE Tag Team Championship	6:02
9	Victoria (c) defeated Molly Holly by pinfall	Hair vs. Title match for the WWE Women's Championship	4:52
10	Eddie Guerrero (c) defeated Kurt Angle by pinfall	Singles match for the WWE Championship	21:34
11	The Undertaker (with Paul Bearer) defeated Kane by pinfall	Singles match	7:46
12	Chris Benoit defeated Triple H (c) and Shawn Michaels by submission	Triple threat match for the World Heavyweight Championship	24:47
(c) / – the champion(s) heading into the match
