= Backlash (2004) =

World Wrestling Entertainment pay-per-view event

- Promotional poster featuring Edmonton native Chris Benoit
- Promotion: World Wrestling Entertainment
- Brand: Raw
- Date: April 18, 2004
- City: Edmonton, Alberta, Canada
- Venue: Rexall Place
- Attendance: 13,000
- Buy rate: 295,000

Pay-per-view chronology
← Previous; WrestleMania XX	Next → Judgment Day

Backlash chronology
← Previous; 2003	Next → 2005

WWE in Canada chronology
← Previous; No Way Out	Next → SummerSlam

The 2004 Backlash was a professional wrestling pay-per-view (PPV) event produced by the American promotion World Wrestling Entertainment (WWE). It was the sixth annual Backlash and took place on April 18, 2004, at Rexall Place in Edmonton, Alberta, Canada, which was the only Backlash event held outside the continental United States until the 2023 event. It was held exclusively for wrestlers from the promotion's Raw brand division, which made it the first brand-exclusive Backlash after the previous two years also featured wrestlers from SmackDown!. The concept of the event was based around the backlash from WrestleMania XX.

The main event was a triple threat match for the World Heavyweight Championship involving reigning champion and hometown talent Chris Benoit versus Triple H versus Shawn Michaels, which Benoit won after forcing Michaels to submit to the sharpshooter. One of the predominant matches on the card was Randy Orton versus Cactus Jack in a hardcore match for the WWE Intercontinental Championship. Orton won the match and retained the title after pinning Cactus following an RKO. Another primary match on the undercard was Edge versus Kane, which Edge won by pinfall after executing a spear.

== Production ==
=== Background ===
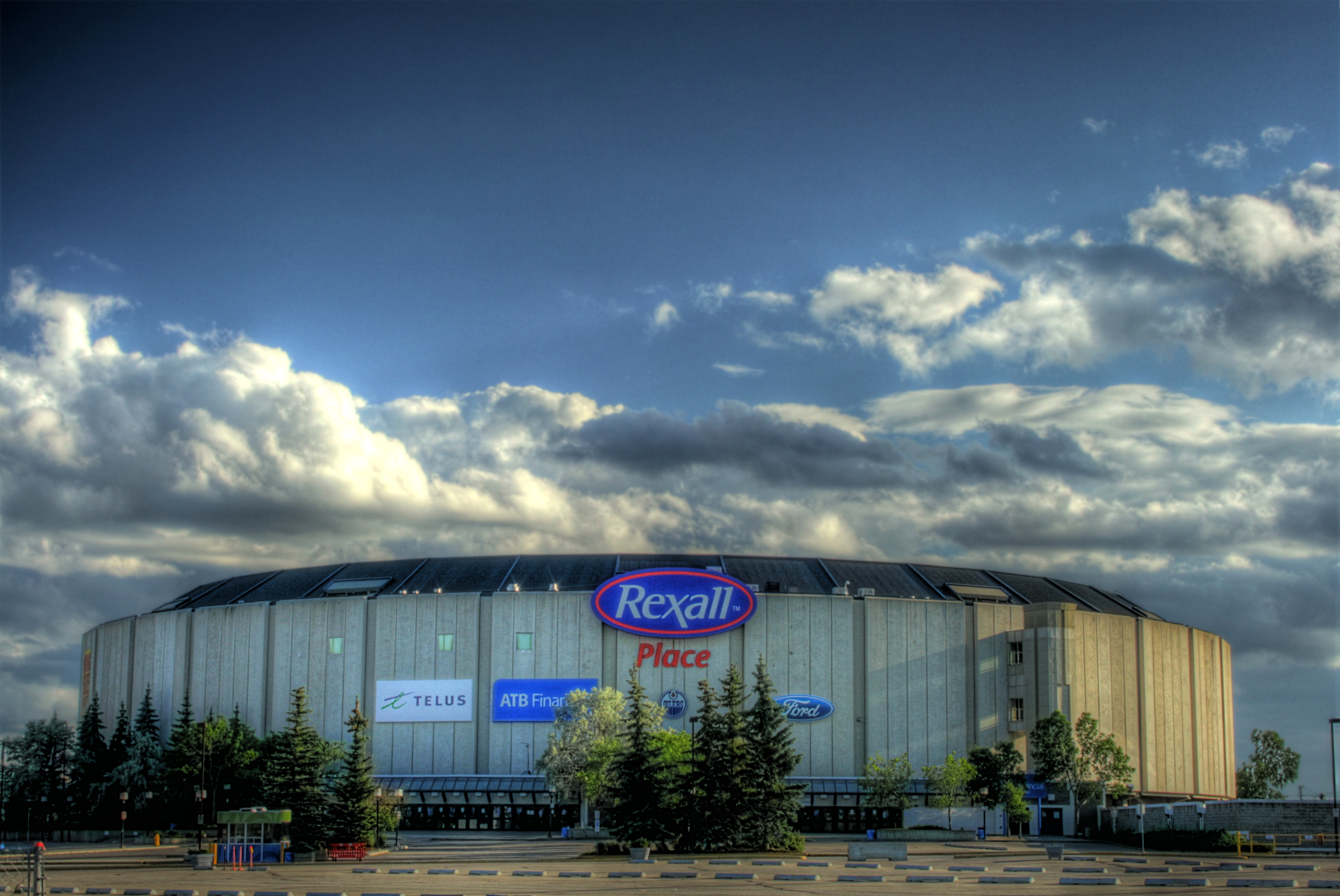
The event was held at Rexall Place in Edmonton, Alberta, Canada.

Backlash is a professional wrestling pay-per-view (PPV) event that was established by the American promotion World Wrestling Entertainment (WWE) in 1999. The concept is based around the backlash from WWE's flagship event, WrestleMania. The sixth event featured the backlash from WrestleMania XX and it was scheduled to take place on April 18, 2004, at Rexall Place in Edmonton, Alberta, Canada, being the first Backlash held outside the United States. While the previous two years had featured wrestlers from both the Raw and SmackDown! brand divisions, the 2004 event was held exclusively for Raw, which made it the first brand-exclusive Backlash.

=== Storylines ===
The main feud heading into Backlash was between Chris Benoit, Triple H, and Shawn Michaels over the World Heavyweight Championship. Chris Benoit won the title one month prior at WrestleMania XX when he defeated Michaels and then-champion Triple H in a triple threat match. Benoit won the match by forcing Triple H to submit to the Crippler Crossface. On the March 15 episode of Raw, Benoit and Michaels defeated Evolution (Randy Orton, Ric Flair, and Batista) in a 3-on-2 handicap tag team match. Benoit and Michaels won the match after Benoit forced Batista to submit to the Sharpshooter. On the March 22 episode of Raw, Triple H was drafted to the SmackDown! brand, and Raw General Manager Eric Bischoff announced that Michaels would receive a World Heavyweight Championship match against Benoit at Backlash. On the March 25 episode of SmackDown!, SmackDown! General Manager Kurt Angle announced that Triple H had been traded back to the Raw brand in exchange for The Dudley Boyz and Booker T. On the March 29 episode of Raw, Bischoff made the one-on-one World Heavyweight Championship match between Benoit and Michaels a triple threat match also involving Triple H, thus being a rematch from WrestleMania.

The other main match on the card was a hardcore match for the WWE Intercontinental Championship between Randy Orton and Mick Foley. Three months prior at the Royal Rumble, after Mick Foley eliminated Orton and himself from the Royal Rumble match, Orton hit Foley with a steel chair, and the two brawled up the ramp and into the back. At WrestleMania XX, Evolution (Orton, Batista, and Ric Flair) faced off against The Rock 'n' Sock Connection (Foley and The Rock) in a handicap match. Evolution won the match when Orton pinned Foley after an RKO. On the March 29 episode of Raw, Foley challenged Orton to a Hardcore match for the WWE Intercontinental Championship at Backlash, which Orton accepted that same night. Mick Foley added another stipulation that Evolution would be banned from ringside.

Another feud heading into the event was between Chris Jericho against Christian and Trish Stratus. At WrestleMania XX, Christian defeated Jericho. After the match, Stratus, Jericho's on-screen girlfriend at the time, turned on Jericho and joined Christian. On the April 5 episode of Raw, Christian announced that he would be teaming up with Stratus to take on Jericho in a handicap match at Backlash.

== Event ==
Other on-screen personnel
Role:	Name:
English commentators	Jim Ross
English commentators	Jerry Lawler
Spanish commentators	Carlos Cabrera
Spanish commentators	Hugo Savinovich
Interviewers	Jonathan Coachman
Interviewers	Todd Grisham
Ring announcer	Lilian Garcia
Referees	Mike Chioda
Referees	Chad Patton
Referees	Jack Doan
Referees	Earl Hebner

=== Preliminary matches ===
Before the event went live on pay-per-view, Val Venis defeated Matt Hardy in a match taped for Sunday Night Heat. The first match that aired was between Shelton Benjamin and Ric Flair. After back and forth action between the two, Flair attempted to use brass knuckles on Benjamin but Benjamin splashed Flair from behind. Benjamin then performed a diving clothesline on Flair for the win.

Next was a match between Jonathan Coachman and Tajiri. During the match, Garrison Cade interfered on Coachman's behalf, allowing Coachman to roll-up Tajiri for the win.

The third match of the event was Chris Jericho versus Christian and Trish Stratus in a handicap match. Jericho won the match by pinning Christian after throwing him onto Stratus and executing an enziguiri.

In the next match, Victoria faced Lita for the WWE Women's Championship. Both women evenly controlled the match. The match ended when Victoria pinned Lita with an Inside Cradle. After the match, Molly Holly and Gail Kim attacked both Lita and Victoria.

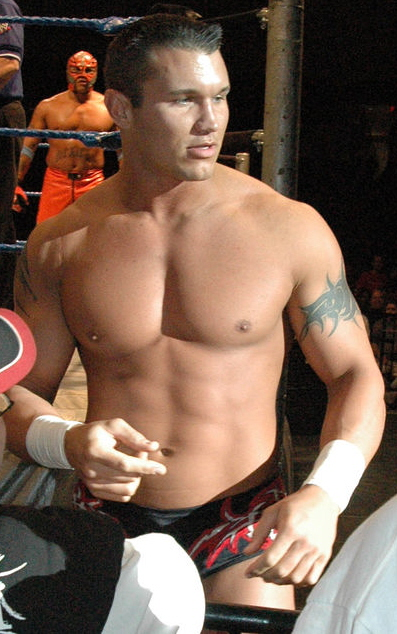
Randy Orton defended the Intercontinental Championship against Mick Foley.

Next was a Hardcore match between Randy Orton and Mick Foley for the WWE Intercontinental Championship, with the stipulation that Evolution were banned from ringside. One spot in the match saw Cactus lie a barbed wire baseball bat between Orton's legs and perform a leg drop. Cactus continued to use the bat, as he poured gasoline on it and tried to light it on fire. Raw General Manager Eric Bischoff interrupted and informed Cactus that he would lose the match and the event would end if he lit the bat on fire. In a particularly brutal spot, Orton - wearing only his signature trunks - missed an RKO and was thrown onto thumbtacks. When this spot had been attempted previously, those involved - including Foley himself - had done so fully clothed. The sight of Orton with thumbtacks embedded into his bare body was, for many, the first major bump of his career. After taking an elbow drop off the entrance stage, Orton executed an RKO on Cactus onto the barbed wire baseball bat to retain the title.

The sixth match was a tag team match in which The Hurricane and Rosey defeated La Résistance (Robért Conway and Sylvain Grenier). After a back and forth match, The Hurricane pinned Conway after an Eye of the Hurricane.

The match that followed was between Edge and Kane. The match was controlled by Kane, as he focused on Edge's injured left hand. Edge reversed attacks from Kane and attempted a Spear but Kane avoided, causing Edge to perform a Spear on the referee. Edge struck Kane with the cast and performed a spear on Kane for the win.

=== Main event ===
The main event was a triple threat match for the World Heavyweight Championship between Chris Benoit, Shawn Michaels, and Triple H. Michaels dove off the top rope but Benoit and Triple H avoided, causing Michaels to fall through an announce table. Triple H attacked Michaels with a sledgehammer. Benoit forced Michaels to submit to the sharpshooter to retain the title.

== Aftermath ==
The following night on Raw, General manager Eric Bischoff scheduled a World Heavyweight Championship match between Chris Benoit and Shawn Michaels for the May 3 episode of Raw. On the same night, an impromptu team of Benoit and Edge defeated Evolution (Ric Flair and Batista) for the World Tag Team Championship, making Benoit a double champion. Two weeks later on Raw, Benoit retained the World Heavyweight title in a scheduled match against Shawn Michaels, after interference by Triple H. On May 10, a match between Shelton Benjamin and Triple H, resulted in Michaels attacking Triple H. Michaels' actions resulted in a suspension from Eric Bischoff. Prior to Raw that night, Bischoff informed Triple H that he would face Benoit for the World title the following week on Raw. However, the match never happened as during that night, a Battle Royal took place, in which the winner would go on to face Benoit at Bad Blood for the World title. During the match, Triple H, one of the participants in the match, was eliminated by Michaels, who was not a participant in the match.

On the May 24 episode of Raw, Bischoff lifted Michaels' suspension, after Triple H pleaded that Michaels be reinstated. On the same night, Michaels confronted Bischoff wanting to know if he was scheduled in a match with Triple H at Bad Blood. Bischoff assured Michaels, but Triple H attacked Michaels from behind, after Michaels attacked Triple H outside the arena's parking lot. Bischoff gave orders to Raw superstars to attack Triple H and Michaels, if seen fighting. The roster tried breaking the fight up, but were unsuccessful in doing so. The result of the fight gave Bischoff the authority to schedule a Hell in a Cell match between Triple H and Michaels at Bad Blood. At Bad Blood, Triple H defeated Michaels by pinfall after executing two Pedigrees.

Following Backlash, Lita and Kane were put in an angle, which involved Matt Hardy. It saw Hardy attack Kane to an attempt to prevent Kane from harming Lita. In the following weeks on Raw, Kane began repeatedly assaulting Hardy and attempting to seduce Lita. One incident saw Kane kayfabe kidnap Lita and hold her tied up backstage, where he supposedly asked her a "question." Later that night, Kane won a number one contenders Battle Royal match, in which he received a title shot at Bad Blood. At Bad Blood, Benoit was successful in defending the World Heavyweight title, after he pinned Kane with a roll-up.

During a match between Christian and Chris Jericho, Christian defeated Jericho after interference by Tyson Tomko; Tomko was revealed to be the "problem solver" for Christian and Trish Stratus. The following weeks on Raw, Tomko assaulted Jericho, until May 10, when Jericho defeated Christian in a Steel Cage match when he made Christian submit to the Walls of Jericho. As a result of the Steel Cage match, Christian suffered a legitimate back injury. After defeating Randy Orton and Batista in a tag team match, Tomko attacked Jericho, in which he powerbombed Jericho through the announcers table. On the June 7 episode of Raw, Bischoff booked a match at Bad Blood between Tomko and Jericho. At Bad Blood, Jericho pinned Tomko, after an Enzuigiri.

Mick Foley named his match with Orton the favorite match of his career.

== Results ==
No.	Results	Stipulations	Times
1^{H}	Val Venis defeated Matt Hardy	Singles match	7:58
2	Shelton Benjamin defeated Ric Flair	Singles match	9:29
3	Jonathan Coachman defeated Tajiri	Singles match	6:25
4	Chris Jericho defeated Christian and Trish Stratus	Handicap match	11:32
5	Victoria (c) defeated Lita	Singles match for the WWE Women's Championship	7:22
6	Randy Orton (c) defeated Mick Foley	Hardcore match for the WWE Intercontinental Championship Evolution were banned from ringside	23:04
7	Rosey and The Hurricane defeated La Résistance (Robért Conway and Sylvain Grenier)	Tag team match	5:02
8	Edge defeated Kane	Singles match	6:25
9	Chris Benoit (c) defeated Shawn Michaels and Triple H by submission	Triple threat match for the World Heavyweight Championship	30:10
(c) / – the champion(s) heading into the match; H / – the match was broadcast prior to the pay-per-view on Sunday Night Heat

== See also ==
- Professional wrestling in Canada
