= Jonathan Coachman =

American sports anchor and professional wrestling personality

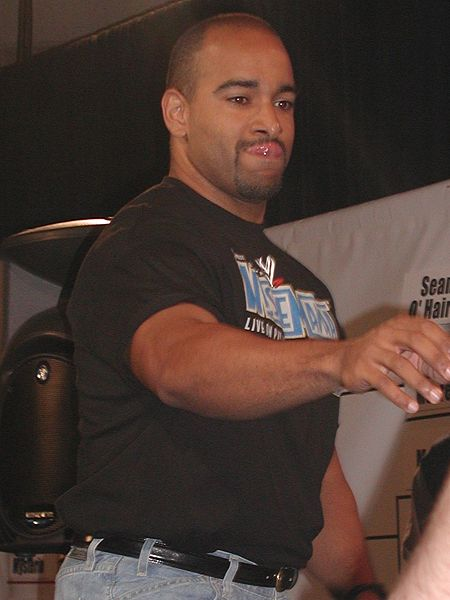
- Coachman in 2003

Personal information
- Born: Jonathan William Coachman; August 12, 1973 (age 53) Fort Worth, Texas, U.S.
- Spouse: Amy Coachman (m. 1999)
- Children: 2

Professional wrestling career
- Ring name(s): Jonathan Coachman; The Coach
- Billed height: 6 ft 3 in (191 cm)
- Billed weight: 235 lb (107 kg)
- Billed from: Fort Worth, Texas
- Trained by: Chris Benoit; Shane McMahon
- Debut: December 23, 1999
- Retired: 2021

Jonathan William Coachman (born August 12, 1973), also known as "The Coach", is an American sports analyst and former professional wrestling personality.

== Early life ==
Before embarking on an announcing career in professional wrestling, Coachman was a high school basketball player. After two state basketball championships at McPherson High School in McPherson, Kansas, Coachman moved across town to continue playing for McPherson College. While at McPherson, Coachman's interests included participating in theatre, serving as the sports editor for the school newspaper, and doing play-by-play and color commentary for the local football and basketball radio broadcasts. Coachman was also a sports reporter/anchor at KAKE in Wichita, Kansas, and also lived for a time in Newton Falls, Ohio, frequently attending Youngstown State Penguins basketball games.

Coachman also starred in many instructional videos used for technical education classrooms of middle schools and high schools. One set of videos featured "Coach" instructing people on flight navigation and the basics of airplanes. He also had a "boyfriend-in-a-box" modeled after him during college. Coachman also worked for local Kansas City news station KMBC-TV, where he was a correspondent for Larry King Live's coverage of Owen Hart's death in May 1999.

== Professional wrestling career ==
=== World Wrestling Federation/Entertainment/WWE ===
==== Backstage interviewer (2000–2003) ====
Coachman began his World Wrestling Federation (WWF) career as an interviewer, commentator, and presenter on SmackDown! on January 13, 2000. Coachman was also involved in occasional segments with The Rock, in which The Rock attempted to humiliate Coachman in any form possible, whether it was forcing him to sing, dance, or smile for the camera. The Rock also accused Coachman of performing rather lewd activities with farm animals.

During winter of 2001, Coachman was pressed into service as a sideline reporter for regional telecasts of the WWF-owned XFL, initially serving on the same broadcast team as WWF commentators Jim Ross and Jerry Lawler.

==== Commentator and Assistant to Eric Bischoff (2003–2006) ====
The Coach made a heel turn against Shane McMahon on August 24, 2003, at SummerSlam. After this he would have an on-screen role as the "lackey" to then General Manager of Raw, Eric Bischoff. The Coach continued to work as a heel and later teamed up with his fellow WWE Heat announcer Al Snow in a storyline feud against the Raw announce team, Jerry Lawler and Jim Ross. This feud would even see the pair win the right to announce the main show from Ross and Lawler at one point, as The Coach and Snow defeated Ross and Lawler at Unforgiven. Later, The Coach achieved a singles victory on pay-per-view at Backlash, in 2004 by defeating Tajiri (albeit with the assistance of Garrison Cade). The Coach would go on to host the 2004 and 2005 Raw Diva Searches. Later, The Coach would gain his own column in the now defunct Raw Magazine ("Coach's Corner") and his own webcast on WWE.com ("CoachCast"). Coachman was officially added as the third member to the Raw broadcast team and signed a multi-year contract with WWE in 2005.

During October 2005, The Coach was involved in an angle involving the McMahon Family publicly firing Jim Ross due to the actions of Ross's friend, Steve Austin. The firing of Ross gave The Coach the position of lead announcer on Raw. The storyline would culminate in a match at Taboo Tuesday where Austin was scheduled to face The Coach in a match with both Austin's and Ross's jobs on the line. Though the match was originally scheduled to be Austin versus The Coach, Austin refused to participate because of issues he had with the storyline (the original story was said to have called for Austin to lose following a run-in by the returning Mark Henry). World Heavyweight Champion Batista was renamed the opponent to play up the SmackDown! vs. Raw storylines. On the October 31, 2005 edition of Raw, Batista came out and accepted the match only to be attacked by The Coach's backup, the returning Goldust and Vader. At Taboo Tuesday, Batista faced off against The Coach in a fan-voted Street Fight. Vader and Goldust tried to interfere in the match, but Batista won. However, no mention of the Jim Ross stipulation was ever mentioned after the match.

Former ECW announcer Joey Styles soon replaced The Coach in a move that became permanent despite The Coach's on-air protestations that Styles' presence was temporary. The Coach retained a prominent role on the Raw announcing team as the heel representative of a three-man booth with Styles, the play-by-play man, and Jerry "The King" Lawler, the babyface color commentator.

On the January 23, 2006 edition of Raw, The Coach defeated Lawler to win the last Raw spot in the Royal Rumble match via interference from the debuting Spirit Squad. The Coach would enter seventh during the match only to be eliminated almost immediately by Big Show.

==== Executive Assistant and Interim General Manager (2006–2007) ====
During the April 24 edition of Raw, after Coachman hosted a Divas bikini contest, Viscera came down to the ring and performed the Viscagra on Coachman. During the commercial break of that show, still in the ring, he quit in protest of his treatment on Raw. On the May 29 edition of Raw, it was revealed that Mr. McMahon had hired Coachman under the new position of McMahon's Executive Assistant; to aid McMahon in the daily running of the Raw brand, and actually acted as the General Manager when the McMahons were absent. While Executive Assistant, Coachman, along with the McMahons, feuded with the reformed D-Generation X and also had issues with John Cena. On June 18, 2007, Coachman was officially named Interim General Manager of Raw by the McMahon Family following the kayfabe death of Vince McMahon in a limo explosion.

On the August 6, 2007 edition of Raw, William Regal became the new General Manager on the Raw brand after winning a battle royal featuring other participants from the Raw roster. As a result, Coachman was removed from his position as Interim General Manager and became Regal's new assistant. However, following a kayfabe assault by John Cena on Regal during the September 3 edition of Raw, Regal had to be temporarily relieved of his duties as General Manager at which point Coachman was once again named interim General Manager of Raw until Regal was fit to resume his role. On the October 1 edition of Raw, Regal returned as General Manager which resulted in Coachman being once again demoted to his prior rank.

On the December 3, 2007 edition of Raw, Coachman was in a No DQ Handicap match with Carlito against Hornswoggle, with whom he had been having problems. However, Hornswoggle had paid the APA to protect him during the match. Coachman was pinned by Hornswoggle after a Clothesline from Hell and a Tadpole Splash.

A rivalry ensued and one night Coachman chased Hornswoggle all over the backstage area, and it eventually moved to the arena, where Hornswoggle performed his "hide under the ring" trick to get away. Coachman moved to the other side of the ring and pulled out a detonator, much to the surprise of Jim Ross. He attempted to activate the detonator twice, but nothing happened. He then moved under the ring to check the explosives, and Hornswoggle came out from under the ring, and successfully detonated the explosives, causing smoke to appear from under the ring, and the cameras to make television screens change color, from gray to rainbow, and according to Ross, the building shook. Coachman was charred and unable to move.

==== SmackDown commentator and departure (2008) ====
On the January 4, 2008 episode of SmackDown!, Coachman would replace John "Bradshaw" Layfield (JBL), who rejoined Raw the previous week, on commentary alongside Michael Cole. Later that year in June, Coachman's contract expired after he decided not to renew it.

=== Return to WWE ===
==== Part-time appearances (2016–2018) ====
On March 25, 2016, Coachman made a special appearance during WWE's live event held at Madison Square Garden. On the March 28 episode of Raw, Coachman returned to WWE television for the first time in almost 8 years, cutting a promo with The New Day. Coachman would also announce that SportsCenter would be live leading up to WrestleMania 32 on April 3. On the January 22, 2018, episode of Raw 25 Years, Coachman would appear in a backstage segment with Raw general manager Kurt Angle and other past WWE talent, Harvey Wippleman, The Brooklyn Brawler, Theodore Long, Brother Love and The Boogeyman.

==== Raw commentator and Pre-show host (2018–21) ====
On January 29, 2018, Coachman re-signed with WWE, joining the Raw commentary team alongside Michael Cole and Corey Graves, replacing Booker T as color commentator. On September 10, Coachman would leave the Raw commentary team, being replaced by Renee Young, with Coachman becoming the new pre-show panel host for pay-per-views.

Coachman also served as pregame host for the 2020 incarnation of the XFL. Coachman left WWE and the XFL in 2021, stating that he had expected to be reimbursed for his travel expenses but never was due to the XFL's bankruptcy.

== Sports broadcasting career ==
=== ESPN (2008–2017) ===
In 2008, Coachman left WWE to begin a career with ESPN. Starting in mid-2015, Coachman began presenting highlights of WWE's best moments of the week on ESPN and having weekly sitdown interviews with WWE wrestlers on SportsCenter. In October 2017, Coachman announced via his Periscope that his contract at ESPN had expired, thus confirming his departure from the network.

=== NBC Sports Group (2018–2021) ===
As WWE has a television deal with NBCUniversal, in 2018, he was named play-by-play announcer for the NBC-owned World Long Drive Championship. Coachman is also a commentator for PGA Tour Live, which is an NBC Sports Gold subscription service providing additional coverage of golf tournaments.

=== CBS Sports ===
As of 2021, Coachman was employed by CBS Sports.

=== PFL ===
Coachman is also an analyst for Mixed Martial Arts promotion Professional Fighters League.

== Personal life ==
Coachman and his ex-wife Amy have two children. Amy is a former college athlete, and a personal trainer.

== Other media ==
In addition to his WWE assignments, Coachman called various sports events on College Sports Television, a cable and satellite network owned by CBS, including football, basketball, baseball and softball. He also called college basketball for CN8. In addition, Coachman served as the part-time play-by-play announcer for the WNBA's New York Liberty on the MSG Network, as well as the studio host for New York Knicks games. He also hosted the weekly MSG program MSG, NY.

In 2009, Coachman signed with ESPN as anchor of SportsCenter. In 2012, he became the host of Coach & Company, a nationally syndicated radio program that airs on ESPN Radio.

Coachman also lends his voice talents to the video games Black College Football Xperience: The Doug Williams Edition, Madden NFL 19, Madden NFL 20, Madden NFL 21, Madden 24, and Madden 25 (2024).

In July 2025, Coachman began hosting Off the Ropes on the Pro Wrestling Nation 24/7 channel on SiriusXM.

== Awards and accomplishments ==
- Wrestling Observer Newsletter awards
  - Worst Television Announcer (2003, 2005, 2018)

Preceded by Jim Ross	Monday Night Raw Lead Announcer; 2005	Succeeded by Joey Styles
Preceded by Jim Ross	Monday Night Raw Lead Announcer; 2003	Succeeded by Jim Ross
