= Sharpshooter (professional wrestling) =

Professional wrestling submission hold

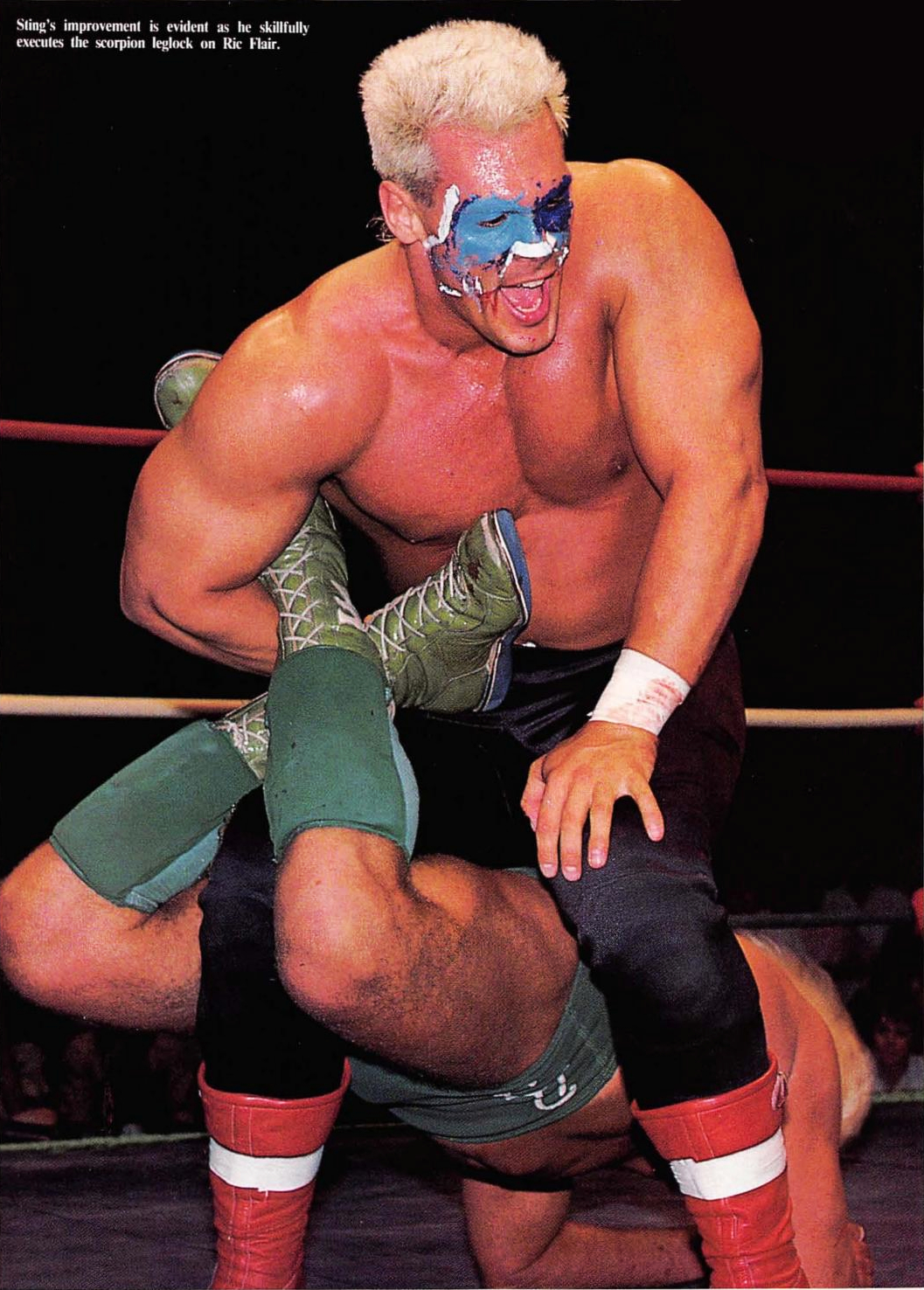
Sting applies the Scorpion Deathlock to Ric Flair in 1988

The Sharpshooter, also known as the Scorpion Deathlock and technically known as the sasori-gatame (蠍固め or サソリ固め; English: scorpion hold), is a professional wrestling submission hold. Similar to several holds such as the cloverleaf leg-lace, the Boston crab and the standing reverse figure-four leglock, the move was invented by Karl Gotch, and given to Riki Choshu, one of his students. It was then popularized by Sting and Bret Hart as the Scorpion Deathlock and Sharpshooter respectively.

The hold begins with the opponent supine on the mat. The applying wrestler steps between the opponent's legs with their own left leg and wraps the opponent's legs at shin level around that leg. If they decide to cross the opponent's legs around their own right leg, they have to cross the opponent's right leg over to the left or the left leg over the right. Holding the opponent's legs in place, they then grab the opponent's leg which they have crossed over the other and steps over the opponent, flipping them over into a prone position before leaning back to compress their lower back. This move is used more commonly by Canadian wrestlers, typically in Canada, to get a bigger crowd reaction, since it is associated with Bret Hart and the Hart family; Canadian wrestlers Edge and Chris Benoit were also notable users of the move.

== History and variations ==
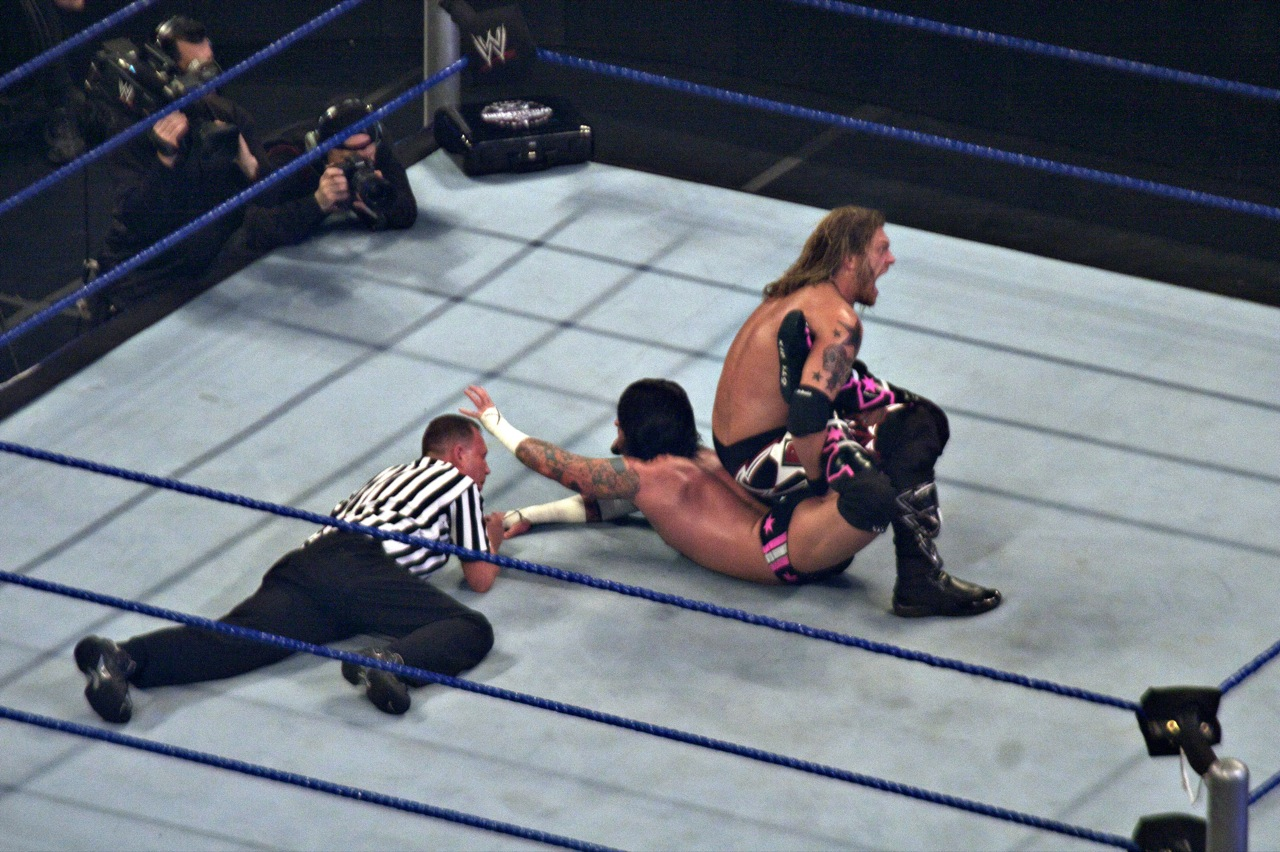
Edge, applying the variation of a kneeling sharpshooter on CM Punk.

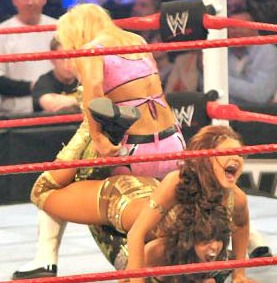
Natalya applying a double sharpshooter on Eve Torres and Layla.

While Bret Hart is the wrestler with whom the Sharpshooter is most often associated, Ronnie Garvin and Sting were the first wrestlers to prolifically use the hold in North America, during which time it was called the "Scorpion Deathlock", deriving from the original Japanese name. In Hart's autobiography, he noted that prior to his first major singles push, Pat Patterson asked if he could do the move, which he was familiar with from Japan, but did not know how to execute. Hart revealed that the only person in the locker room who knew how to execute the move was Konnan, who taught it to Hart. Its name was based on Hart's "Hit Man" nickname (from the underworld slang hit, murder). In WWF publications of the era, Bret's father Stu Hart, long known as a trainer in the game, was generally given credit for devising the move. Edge innovated an inverse variation, which he has dubbed the Edgecator, where he would apply the hold normally, only to face the opposite direction and kneel on the opponent's legs.

The Sharpshooter was infamously used in the Montreal Screwjob at Survivor Series in 1997. Shawn Michaels applied Hart's own Sharpshooter on him. Vince McMahon double-crossed Hart by ordering referee Earl Hebner to ring the bell and award the match to Michaels, despite Hart never having submitted. This moment would be referenced within kayfabe through various future events; McMahon repeated the action at the next year's Survivor Series in 1998, as part of a storyline, during the "Deadly Game" tournament final between The Rock and Mankind. Another occurred on Saturday Night's Main Event XXXII, during a Street Fight between Shawn Michaels and Shane McMahon.

=== Scorpion cross lock ===
Also known as an inverted sharpshooter combined with a double chickenwing, this hold sets up the same as the sharpshooter, with the opponent supine on the mat with the applying wrestler stepping between the opponent's legs with their right leg, and wrapping the opponent's legs at shin level around that leg. However, instead of stepping over the opponent to flip them, the applying wrestler flips the opponent over from left-to-right, keeping the opponent in front of them. The applying wrestler then leans over the opponent and grabs their arms, applying a double chicken wing to the opponent. The applying wrestler then squats back, lifting the opponent's torso into the air. The move was used by Bull Nakano and formerly used by Saraya Bevis, which was coined as the PTO (derived from her then ring-name Paige).

== See also ==
- Professional wrestling holds
