= List of programs broadcast by Jack TV =

This is the list of programs that broadcast on Jack TV, a Filipino cable and satellite television network owned by Solar Entertainment Corporation.

== Previously aired programs ==
=== 0-9 ===
- $25 Million Dollar Hoax
- $h*! My Dad Says
- 24
- 30 Rock
- 666 Park Avenue

=== A ===
- A Day in the Life
- About a Boy (2014–2015)
- Aliens in America
- Allen Gregory
- Alphas (2013–2014)
- American Dad! (2007–2017)
- American Crime Story (2018)
- American Gladiators
- American Horror Story (2011–2018)
- America's Best Dance Crew
- Andy Barker, P.I.
- Arrested Development
- Arrow (2011–2018)
- Autopsy: The Last Hours of... (2018)

=== B ===
- Baby Looney Tunes
- Back to You
- Banzai
- Bates Motel (2014–2016)
- Batman Beyond
- Battleground
- Beast Wars: Transformers
- Beat the Geeks
- Beat TV
- Beauty and the Geek (season 3–5)
- Best Bars in America (2017)
- Best Ink
- Being Human
- Ben 10
- Billy & Billie
- Blue Collar TV
- Bob's Burgers
- Bones
- Brainiac: Science Abuse
- Brand X with Russell Brand (2013–2014)
- Brew Dogs (2015–2017)
- Brickleberry
- Brooklyn Nine-Nine (2014–2016)
- Burn Notice

=== C ===
- Camp Lazlo
- Car Matchmaker (2017)
- Chappelle's Show
- Cheat!
- Chelsea Lately
- Chicago Fire (2018)
- Chozen
- Chowder
- Chuck
- Cinematech
- Clipped
- Comedy Central Presents
- Comedy Inc.
- Conan
- Constantine
- Cooper Barrett's Guide to Surviving Life
- Cosplay Melee (2019)
- Crank Yankers

=== D ===
- Damien (2016)
- DC's Legends of Tomorrow (2017–2018)
- Defiance
- Defying Gravity
- Distraction UK
- Doogie Howser, M.D.
- Dr. Katz, Professional Therapist
- Drawn Together
- Drop the Mic (2019)

=== E ===
- Elementary (2018–2020)
- Empire (2015–2018)
- Everybody Hates Chris

=== F ===
- Family Guy (2007–2018)
- FilmFakers
- Foster's Home for Imaginary Friends
- Futurama

=== G ===
- Glee
- Gotham (2016–2017)
- Grimm
- Ground Floor

=== H ===
- Heavy Gear
- Heroes of Cosplay (2017)
- Heroes Reborn (2015–2016)
- Hip Hop Squares (2019)
- HitRecord on TV (2017)
- House

=== I ===
- I Just Want My Pants Back
- I Live with Models (2017–2018)
- Inside the Actors Studio (2018)
- Insomniac with Dave Attell
- It's Always Sunny in Philadelphia (2006–2015)

=== J ===
- Jackie Chan Adventures (2008–2009)
- Just for Laughs Gags (2006–2010)
- Just for Variety
- Just Kidding (2008–2010)
- Justice League
- Justice League Unlimited

=== K ===
- Kelsey Grammer Presents: The Sketch Show
- Kid Notorious
- Killerpost (2018)
- King of the Hill

=== L ===
- Last Comic Standing
- Late Night with Conan O'Brien
- Late Night with Jimmy Fallon
- Late Show with David Letterman
- Legion of Super Heroes
- Legit
- Lie to Me
- Live from Abbey Road
- Loonatics Unleashed
- Louie
- Lucifer (2016–2018)

=== M ===
- Mad
- MADtv
- Making History (2017)
- Malcolm in the Middle
- Man Seeking Woman (2015)
- Man vs. Cartoon
- Max Steel
- Megas XLR
- Merlin (2014)
- Me, Myself & I (2018–2019)
- Minority Report (2015)
- Motormouth
- Mr. Robot (2017)
- Mulaney
- My Gym Partner's a Monkey
- My Name Is Earl

=== N ===
- Napoleon Dynamite
- NCIS (2018)

=== P ===
- Parks and Recreation
- Partners
- Penn & Teller: Fool Us (2018–2019)
- People of Earth (2016–2018)
- Person of Interest (season 5)
- Powerless
- Premium Blend
- Primetime Glick
- Psych
- Pushing Daisies
- Pussycat Dolls Present: Girlicious
- Pussycat Dolls Present: The Search for the Next Doll

=== R ===
- Raising Hope (2011–2014)
- Rebel Music (2016)
- Ren & Stimpy "Adult Party Cartoon"
- Reno 911!
- Revolution (2012–2014)
- Ride with Funkmaster Flex
- Rob Dyrdek's Fantasy Factory
- Royal Pains (season 7–8) (2018–2019)

=== S ===
- Salem (2014–2015)
- Samurai Jack (2005–2006)
- Saturday Night Live (2008–2019)
- Scare Tactics
- Sex & Drugs & Rock & Roll (2015–2016)
- Shorties Watchin' Shorties
- Sirens (2014–2015)
- Sisterhood of Hip Hop (2017)
- Skin Wars (2015–2017)
- Small Wonder
- Snoop Dogg's Father Hood
- So You Think You Can Dance (2019)
- Sons of Anarchy
- South Park
- Spartan: Ultimate Team Challenge (2017–2018)
- Spider-Man and His Amazing Friends
- Still Standing
- Straight Plan for the Gay Man
- Street Art Throwdown (2015)
- Street Smarts
- Stripperella
- Suits (2011–2019)
- Supergirl (2016–2018)
- Superstore (2017–2019)
- Surviving Jack (2014)
- Survivor (2013–2019)

=== T ===
- Tattoos After Dark (2015)
- Terra Nova
- That '70s Show
- That's My Bush!
- The 100 (2014–2017)
- The Art Of (2015–2017)
- The Avengers
- The Batman
- The Big Bang Theory (2007–2019)
- The Chicago Code
- The Cleveland Show
- The Comedians
- The Daily Show with Jon Stewart
- The Event
- The Flash (2014–2018)
- The Glee Project
- The Incredible Hulk
- The Jamie Kennedy Experiment
- The Jay Leno Show
- The Joe Schmo Show (season 1–2)
- The Killing
- The Last Man on Earth (2015–2017)
- The Loop
- The Man Show
- The Messengers
- The Middle
- The Odd Couple
- The Office (US)
- The Powerpuff Girls
- The Real Gilligan's Island
- The Simpsons
- The Tomorrow People
- The Tonight Show with Conan O'Brien
- The Tonight Show with Jay Leno
- The Tonight Show Starring Jimmy Fallon (2017–2019)
- The War at Home
- The Wonder Years
- Time After Time
- TMZ on TV (2018–2020)
- Tommy Lee Goes to College
- Touch
- Trigger Happy TV
- Two and a Half Men

=== U ===
- Undateable (2014–2017)
- Undercover Boss
- Unsupervised

=== W ===
- Web Soup
- Weekends at the D.L.
- White Collar
- Who Do You Think You Are? (2018)
- Who Wants to Be a Millionaire?
- Who Wants to be a Superhero?
- Wilfred
- Worst Case Scenario

=== X ===
- X-Men (2005–2007)
- X-Men: Evolution (2005–2007)
- X-Play (2005–2007)

=== Y ===
- You, Me and the Apocalypse (2017)
- You're the Worst (2016–2018)

=== Z ===
- Z Nation (2015–2016)

=== WWE programs ===
- ECW
- WWE
- WWE Afterburn
- WWE Bottom Line
- WWE Experience
- WWE Heat
- WWE NXT
- WWE Pay-Per-View
- WWE Raw
- WWE SmackDown
- WWE Velocity
- WWE Vintage Collection

=== Movie and specials block ===
- Jack in the Box (2005–2006)
- Jack TV Handpicked
- Jack TV Playlist (2019–2020)
- Jack TV Preview
- Jack Peep Choice
- Jack's Booth
- JackYard

=== Informative ===
- Hype
- Off The Wall
- The Big Thing
- The Peep Show

=== Informercials ===
- Shop TV (2005–2011, 2014–2020)

=== Sports Coverage ===
- 2005 Manila SEA Games Coverage (2005; together with ETC, Solar Sports, Solar All Access, ABC 5, NBN 4, IBC 13, ANC, RPN 9, SBN 21, RJTV 29, ABS-CBN 2, and Studio 23)
- 2008 Beijing Olympic Games Coverage (2008; together with ETC, 2nd Avenue, C/S, Solar Sports and Basketball TV)
- WWE Bragging Rights (2009–2010)
- WWE Elimination Chamber (2010–2012)
- WWE Extreme Rules (2010–2011)
- WWE Hell in a Cell (2009–2011)
- WWE Money in the Bank (2010–2011)
- WWE Night of Champions (2008–2011)
- WWE NXT Grand Finals (2010–2011)
- WWE Over the Limit (2010–2011)
- WWE Royal Rumble (2005–2012)
- WWE SummerSlam (2006–2011)
- WWE Survivor Series (2005–2011)
- WWE TLC: Tables, Ladders & Chairs (2009–2011)
- WWE Vengeance (2005–2007, 2011)
- WWE Wrestlemania (2005–2011)

=== TV specials ===
- Miss Universe 2016 (January 30, 2017)
- 59th Annual Grammy Awards (February 13, 2017)
- 60th Annual Grammy Awards (January 29, 2018)
- 61st Annual Grammy Awards (February 11, 2019)

== See also ==
- Jack TV
- Solar Entertainment Corporation
