= WWE Experience =

WWE television program

- Created by: Vince McMahon
- Country of origin: United States
- Original language: English

Production
- Production locations: New York City; Stamford, Connecticut
- Camera setup: Multicamera setup
- Running time: 60 minutes (including commercials)

Original release
- Network: Spike TV; International syndication
- Release: May 2, 2004 – January 2, 2020

Related
- Afterburn; Bottom Line; This Week; Vintage; Free For All

WWE Experience, or simply Experience, is a syndicated American television program that was produced by WWE which mainly recaps events taking place on Raw and SmackDown. The show ran from May 2004 until September 2005 in the United States, broadcasting 64 episodes domestically before its cancellation.

The show continued to run in international markets, with it being televised in Mexico as well as in Asian, European and in some African countries. The final episode of Experience aired in January 2020 internationally, and the show was cancelled.

== History ==
The show was originally broadcast by Spike TV and was aired Sunday mornings at 10 A.M. The original hosts were Todd Grisham and Ivory, with the setting of the show being outdoors and usually around New York City. The PG-rated show was aimed at younger viewers and it summarized the events of Raw and Smackdown. The program marked the return of WWE programming to Sunday mornings since the cancellation of WWF Superstars of Wrestling in August 2001.

When WWE programming moved to the USA Network during September 2005, WWE Experience was cancelled in America to later be replaced with AM Raw, but the show continued to be produced for overseas audiences. The filming was moved to the WWE studios in Stamford, Connecticut following reports that Grisham hated to film in the rain. Ivory was released from WWE a few weeks before the cancellation of the show in the United States. In July 2006, Todd Grisham was replaced as host by Josh Mathews, and no clear reason for Grisham's replacement was confirmed despite Mathews reportedly saying, "No reason, Todd's gone, [Josh is] here, deal with it". After Josh Mathews became a commentator on ECW, he was replaced by Jack Korpela. In November 2011, following Korpela's departure from the WWE, he was replaced by Matt Striker. In late 2012, Striker welcomed Renee Young as co-host, and following Striker leaving the WWE in early 2013, Young remained as the sole presenter of the show until she was replaced by Kyle Edwards. When Edwards was released in April 2016 he was replaced by Cathy Kelley who was temporarily joined by Corey Graves soon after.

Experience aired its final episode on the first weekend of January 2020. It was confirmed in a tweet by its host Scott Stanford that production would cease on the show, and no further episodes would air.

The WWE has maintained the Experience trademark after its cancellation. As part of its long term agreement with the Kingdom of Saudi Arabia, the WWE opened its first WWE Experience exhibition in Riyadh on February 16, 2024 during the 2023–24 Riyadh Season.

== Hosts ==
Year(s)	Host(s)
2004–2005	Ivory and Todd Grisham
2005–2006	Todd Grisham
2006–2009	Josh Mathews
2009–2011	Jack Korpela
2011–2012	Matt Striker
2012–2013	Matt Striker and Renee Young
2013–2015	Renee Young
2015–2016	Kyle Edwards
2016	Cathy Kelley
2016–2017	Cathy Kelley and Corey Graves
2017–2020	Cathy Kelley

=== Fill in guest hosts ===
Year	Host
2011, 2013–2014	Scott Stanford
2011	Matt Striker

== International versions ==
=== Canada ===
There was also a different version of the show that aired on the Canadian sports network Sportsnet 360 (previously known as The Score). It mainly recapped Raw and SmackDown. Previously hosted by network personalities rather than WWE employees, the Canadian version was most recently hosted by Scott Stanford and Alyse Zwick, while past hosts have included Ryan Paton, Glenn Schiiler, Derek Snider, Greg Sansone, and Arda Ocal (who later hosted the American version of the show under the name Kyle Edwards). The program first aired on Sunday, October 8, 2006, and in January 2020 was replaced by This Week in WWE.

=== Puerto Rico ===
Puerto Rico hosts their own version of the show that airs Sundays at 1pm on free-to-air WAPA-TV, with the show being hosted by WWE's Spanish broadcaster Marcelo Rodriguez. The show is part of the WWE Weekend programing of the network that features the Spanish broadcast of SmackDown on Saturdays at 1pm and Experience on Sundays.

=== Malaysia ===
Malaysia had their own version of the show hosted by Zawen. It aired on Astro Ria, which is hosted by Malaysia's satellite provider, Astro Malaysia. The show began airing early 2009, before being cancelled after 10 months on the air.
