= WWE Afterburn =

WWE television program

- Created by: Vince McMahon
- Presented by: Megan Morant
- Country of origin: United States
- Original language: English
- No. of episodes: 1104

Production
- Production location: Stamford, Connecticut
- Camera setup: Multicamera setup
- Running time: 60 minutes (including commercials)

Original release
- Network: Spike; Syndicated overseas
- Release: May 25, 2002 – December 31, 2024

Related
- Bottom Line; Experience; This Week; Vintage; Free For All

WWE Afterburn, or simply Afterburn, is an American syndicated television program which recaps events taking place on WWE's weekly flagship program, SmackDown. Along with Bottom Line, it replaced WWE's previous syndicated highlight show, Jakked. The show ran from May 2002 until September 2005 domestically, broadcasting 172 episodes domestically before being removed from syndication. The show continued to run in some international markets such as South Africa, Italy, Germany, Spain and South Asia until the end of 2024.

== International variations ==
=== Malaysia, and South Africa ===
In Malaysia, Afterburn debuted on May 6, 2011. It aired every Monday at 10 pm on Astro SuperSport 4, but now on Astro Prima every Thursday at 11 pm. The show airs on eKasi+ in South Africa on Fridays at 10 pm.

=== Australia ===
In Australia, WWE Afterburn debuted in 2008 on Channel Nine. Afterburn was the only free-to-air WWE show in Australia at the time, with Raw, SmackDown, NXT and Superstars all airing on Fox8. Afterburn had a time slot 1 pm every Sunday, before being moved to 12 am every Tuesday. WWE Afterburn aired 132 episodes in Australia before being removed from syndication on July 28, 2010. Afterburn was replaced with a similar show titled WWE Experience starting November 4 however in December 2014, Afterburn returned and was broadcast on 7mate.

== Hosts ==
Year(s)	Hosts
2002	Marc Lloyd
2002–2003	Ivory
2003	Rue DeBona
2003–2009	Josh Mathews
2009–2011	Jack Korpela
2011–2012	Matt Striker
2012–2013	Tony Dawson
2013	Scott Stanford
2014–2015	Renee Young
2015–2024	Scott Stanford

=== Fill in guest hosts ===
Year(s)	Hosts
2002	Josh Mathews
2005	Michael Cole and Tazz
2008	Jack Korpela
2011	Scott Stanford
2013, 2015–2017	Tom Phillips
2014	Rich Brennan
2015	Kyle Edwards
2022	Kevin Patrick

== Broadcast ==
WWE Afterburn was broadcast from May 2002 to September 2005, before it was removed from syndication in the USA. The show still aired in international markets to fulfill programming commitments until 2025, when the WWE international TV rights deals switched over to Netflix.

== See also ==
- List of WWE television programming
