= WWF Jakked and WWF Metal =

- Also known as: WWF Jakked; WWF Metal
- Created by: World Wrestling Federation
- Country of origin: United States
- Original language: English
- No. of episodes: 193

Production
- Running time: 60 minutes

Original release
- Network: Syndication
- Release: August 28, 1999 – May 19, 2002

Related
- WWF Shotgun Saturday Night (1997–1999); WWE Velocity (2002–2006)

Jakked and Metal (Note: Initially WWF Jakked and WWF Metal, the programs briefly aired as WWE Jakked and WWE Metal under the World Wrestling Entertainment (WWE) banner during May 2002.) are American professional wrestling television programs that were produced by the World Wrestling Federation (WWF, now known as WWE). Both programs aired in broadcast syndication weekly from August 28, 1999 until May 19, 2002, with Jakked on Saturday nights and Metal in the afternoon. Both shows replaced WWF Shotgun Saturday Night.

They featured matches from the week's events, including exclusive undercard matches (generally squashes) taped before Raw is War. After the WWE brand extension, Jakked and Metal also began to feature matches from the SmackDown brand; as such, it was taped before SmackDown tapings. In May 2002, WWE Velocity premiered and began to serve a similar purpose for the SmackDown brand, while Heat (previously taped before SmackDown!) remained part of the Raw brand. At the same time, Jakked and Metal were replaced by WWE Bottom Line and WWE Afterburn in syndication.

== Commentary ==
Jakked and Metal were hosted by many commentators and interviewers. Frequent commentators and hosts included Michael Cole, Kevin Kelly, Tom Prichard, Michael Hayes, Bruce Prichard, Jonathan Coachman, Chris Leary, Marc Lloyd, Terry Taylor and Al Snow.

== International broadcast ==
Metal aired in the United Kingdom on Sky1 until also being replaced by WWE Afterburn in May 2002.
