= List of WWE television programming =

Former and current professional wrestling programs produced by WWE/WWF

The following is a list of all WWE television programs. It also includes programming produced under the Capitol Wrestling Corporation (CWC), World Wide Wrestling Federation (WWWF), World Wrestling Federation (WWF), and World Wrestling Entertainment banners. WWE airs multiple television and web television programs all over the world in a wide range of mediums, including on pay-per-view, on video on demand services, and on streaming services. WWE's three flagship programs are Raw, SmackDown, and NXT.

== Current television programming ==
=== In-ring shows ===
==== Premium live events ====
From 2022, the WWE began using the term "premium live event" for its pay-per-views airing on traditional PPV and its WWE Network over-the-top streaming service. The Premium Live Events WWE hold currently are:

Month	Main roster		NXT	
Month	PLE	First held	PLE	First held
Twice a year	WWE in Saudi Arabia	2018	—N/a	
January	Royal Rumble	1988	—N/a	
February	Elimination Chamber	2010	Vengeance Day	2001
March/April	WrestleMania	1985	Stand & Deliver	2021
May/June	Backlash	1999	Battleground	2013
July	Money in the Bank	2010	—N/a	
August	SummerSlam	1988	—N/a	
September	—N/a		No Mercy	1999
October	Bad Blood	1997	Halloween Havoc	1989
November	Survivor Series	1987	—N/a	
December	—N/a		Deadline	2022

==== Weekly television shows ====
Show	First held	Notes	Brands
Raw	1993	WWE's main weekly wrestling program. It currently streams Mondays on Netflix. Also referred to as Monday Night Raw.	Raw
SmackDown	1999	Weekly program that airs Fridays on the USA Network. Also referred to as Friday Night SmackDown.	SmackDown
NXT	2010	Weekly program that airs Tuesdays on The CW network.	NXT
Main Event	2012	Weekly program that streams Wednesdays on Rumble.	Raw, SmackDown and NXT
Evolve	2025	Weekly program that streams Wednesdays on Tubi.	Evolve
Lucha Libre AAA	2026	Weekly program that streams Saturdays on YouTube.	AAA

==== Television specials ====
Month	Main roster		NXT	
Month	Special	First held	Special	First held
Quarterly	Saturday Night's Main Event	1985	—N/a	
January	—N/a		New Year's Evil	2021
February	—N/a			
March	—N/a		Roadblock	2016
April	—N/a		Spring Breakin'	2022
May/June	—N/a			
July/August	—N/a		The Great American Bash	1985
September/October	—N/a			
November/December	—N/a			

=== Other shows ===
==== Biography: WWE Legends (2021–present) ====
Biography: WWE Legends is a television series produced by WWE and A&E.

==== WWE's Most Wanted Treasures (2021–present) ====
WWE's Most Wanted Treasures is a television series produced by WWE and A&E.

==== Rivals (2022–present) ====
Hosted by Freddie Prinze Jr. for the first three seasons and by Gabriel Iglesias from season four onwards, WWE Rivals is a round table discussion featuring WWE Legends and Superstars examining the most iconic rivalries in WWE.

==== LFG (2025–present) ====
WWE LFG involves "rising talent" competing for a NXT contract. The competitors are mentored by WWE Hall of Famers and veterans, including Bubba Ray Dudley, The Undertaker, Shawn Michaels, Mickie James, and Booker T.

==== WWE Unreal (2025–present) ====
WWE Unreal is a behind-the-scenes documentary series broadcast on Netflix.

== Former television programming ==
=== In-ring shows ===
==== Heavyweight Wrestling (1956–1971) ====
The very first programming produced by the Capitol Wrestling Corporation, the WWWF's immediate predecessor, was Heavyweight Wrestling. The show involved wrestlers of low card to main event status. Following an episode's final match, the ring announcers informed viewers about next week's matches. Most of the events were held in Washington D.C.'s National Arena. Ray Morgan did the commentary for the show and "Friendly" Bob Freed and "Smiling" Sam Mason served as ring announcers. Usually the main events involved WWWF Champion Bruno Sammartino retaining his title. The show ended in September 1971 and was replaced by All-Star Wrestling.

==== All-Star Wrestling (1971–1986) ====
All-Star Wrestling was a WWF promotional show that featured enhancement matches and interviews that were designed to further featured talent. The show was taped at the Hamburg Fieldhouse in Hamburg, Pennsylvania. The show replaced Heavyweight Wrestling from Washington DC. All-Star Wrestling ran from October 2, 1971, through August 30, 1986, when it was replaced by the new program Wrestling Challenge. All-Star Wrestling served as the "B" show of the WWF's syndicated programming in the early 80s, behind WWF Championship Wrestling. Typically, the show comprised matches with play-by-play from Vince McMahon, with occasional assistance from Lord Alfred Hayes and Pat Patterson; it was later hosted by Gorilla Monsoon and Jesse Ventura. From 1982 until 1984, the theme of All-Star Wrestling was "Gemini Dream" by The Moody Blues. From 1984 to 1986, the theme was David Bowie's "Modern Love".

==== Championship Wrestling (1971–1986) ====
Championship Wrestling is one of the original TV shows of the World Wrestling Federation. It included all the stars of the WWF, interviews and championship matches. The show lasted from 1971 until August 1986 and was the flagship of the WWF's programming until it was replaced by Superstars of Wrestling. In 1984, the show used "Thriller" by Michael Jackson as its opening theme. The host and announcer was Vince McMahon, often joined by a co-host.

==== WWF on MSG Network (1976–1997) ====
WWF on MSG Network is a monthly television special that aired live from Madison Square Garden on the MSG Network from August 7, 1976, to March 16, 1997.

==== All American Wrestling (1983–1994) ====
WWF All American Wrestling is a cable television program that was a predecessor to Tuesday Night Titans and Saturday Night's Main Event, originally filling the 11:00 a.m. Eastern Time slot on Sundays vacated by the cancellation of Southwest Championship Wrestling. The show ran from September 4, 1983, to October 16, 1994, on the USA Network. After it was canceled in 1994, it was replaced by Action Zone.

==== Wrestling at the Chase (1983–1985) ====
Wrestling at the Chase is a television program produced by WWF at the Chase Park Plaza Hotel that aired on KPLR-TV, Channel 11 in St. Louis, Missouri. An early strike in the WWF's national expansion, WWF had usurped the St. Louis Wrestling Club's traditional TV timeslot; the St. Louis Wrestling Club had produced Wrestling at the Chase since 1959. The program was replaced by WWF Championship Wrestling in 1985.

==== World Championship Wrestling (1984–1985) ====
World Championship Wrestling is a television program that was produced by WWF that aired on Superstation WTBS from 1984 to 1985. The show took over the time slot of Georgia Championship Wrestling's World Championship Wrestling program that had been broadcasting on WTBS for 12 years; the WWF had purchased a majority interest in GCW. Poor fan response to the use of match footage already broadcast elsewhere instead of new matches and the style of WWF programming led Turner to give other time slots to competing promotions, leading to strained relations between TBS and the WWF. The time slot and program name was eventually sold to Jim Crockett Promotions, who continued to use the World Championship Wrestling for the show name until 1988, when TBS itself bought the assets of JCP and used the name for the promotion World Championship Wrestling.

==== Maple Leaf Wrestling (1984–1986) ====
Maple Leaf Wrestling is a television program that was produced by WWF that aired exclusively in Canada. The show came into creation after the WWF's takeover of the then-NWA-affiliated Maple Leaf Wrestling promotion. The show was discontinued in 1986 and the Maple Leaf Wrestling name was used by the WWF for Canadian airings of WWF Superstars of Wrestling, with modifications made to conform with Canadian content requirements.

==== Prime Time Wrestling (1985–1993) ====
WWF Prime Time Wrestling aired on the USA Network from 1985 to 1993. A precursor to Monday Night Raw, Prime Time Wrestling was a two-hour-long, weekly program that included stars of the World Wrestling Federation. The program comprised wrestling matches (most of which were compiled from the WWF's syndicated programs of the era, combined with "house show" matches from venues such as Madison Square Garden), interviews, promos by wrestlers, updates of current feuds and announcements of upcoming local and pay-per-view events.

==== Wrestling Challenge (1986–1995) ====
WWF Wrestling Challenge aired from 1986 to August 1995 and was syndicated weekly. The show premiered as WWF Wrestling Challenge and became simply known as WWF Challenge in 1995. The show comprised matches, pre-match interviews, enhancement talent matches, and occasionally, summarized weekly events in WWF programming. As with other syndicated WWF programming, the show promoted WWF event dates and house shows in local media markets.

==== Superstars of Wrestling (1986–2001) ====
WWF Superstars of Wrestling is a professional wrestling program that debuted on September 6, 1986, in syndication aired until 2001, by that time having moved to cable. Superstars, as it would later be known, was the flagship of the WWF's programming from its inception until being eclipsed by Monday Night Raw in 1993.

==== The Main Event (1988–1991) ====
WWF The Main Event is a spin-off of the show WWF Saturday Night's Main Event and occasionally aired on NBC on Friday nights. Only the first three The Main Event episodes were shown live on NBC. The final two were taped and then shown on NBC at a later date.

==== Survivor Series Showdown (1989–1993) ====
Survivor Series Showdown is a WWF series of special television programs that aired on the USA Network between 1989 and 1993. The show aired one week prior to the year's respective Survivor Series.

==== SummerSlam Spectacular (1991–1993) ====
SummerSlam Spectacular is a WWF series of special television programs that aired on the USA Network between 1991 and 1993. The show aired one week prior to the year's respective SummerSlam.

==== March to WrestleMania (1992–1994) ====
March to WrestleMania is a WWF series of special television programs that aired on the USA Network between 1992 and 1994. The show aired one week prior to the year's respective WrestleMania.

==== Action Zone (1994–1996) ====
WWF Action Zone is a program that aired on the USA Network from October 23, 1994, to September 15, 1996, and was hosted by Todd Pettengill and Dok Hendrix. Originally the show comprised matches with top WWF talent but by the end of 1995, Action Zone became a Sunday morning highlights show highlighting both Monday Night Raw and Superstars of Wrestling. In 1996, Action Zone was canceled and replaced by Superstars, which had moved to USA Network from syndication.

==== Sunday Night Slam (1994–1995) ====
WWF Sunday Night Slam is a program by the WWF that aired Sunday nights on the USA Network.

==== Free for All (1996–2009) ====
Free For All is a monthly studio television show produced by WWE. It served as a thirty-minute preview show to the promotion's monthly events on pay-per-view and as such aired freely on PPV channels a half-hour before the actual pay-per-view event starts. The original format of Free For All also featured exclusive matches Following No Way Out 2009, the Free For All name was discontinued in the United States.

==== Friday Night's Main Event (1997) ====
WWF Friday Night's Main Event aired on the USA Network when Raw was preempted on the weeks of August 29 and September 5, 1997, due to USA's coverage of the US Open. This program averaged a low 1.5 rating.

==== Shotgun Saturday Night (1997–1999) ====
WWF Shotgun Saturday Night aired between 1997 and 1999 and was a syndicated show that comprised matches with lower card wrestlers. Shotgun Saturday Night was replaced by WWF Jakked in 1999. As a notation, there were various versions of this show that floated around in different markets such as WWF Shotgun and WWF Shotgun Challenge, which were basically the same content just rearranged with different commentary (Shotgun Challenge being specific to the New York market). There were also three other shows with basically the same content, although camera angles, commentary, and local promos were different. Those being Canadian Superstars (hosted By Tom Prichard, Ray Rougeau and - briefly - Gorilla Monsoon), WWF New York (hosted by Vince Russo among others), and WWF 11:Alive.

==== Super Astros (1998–1999) ====
WWF Super Astros (English: WWF Superstars) is a Spanish-language television program produced by the WWF that aired on Univision from November 22, 1998 to September 5, 1999. The show featured lower-card WWF superstars as well as competitors from the Mexico-based AAA and Consejo Mundial de Lucha Libre promotions and Japan. The show was hosted by Marcelo Rodriguez with Carlos Cabrera and Hugo Savinovich providing commentary who have provided Spanish-language commentary for the WWF's pay-per-view events and Monday Night Raw prior to the show's premiere. The show also featured highlights of Raw with brief recaps or full matches dubbed over by the Spanish commentary team.

==== Heat (1998–2008) ====
Heat (formerly known as Sunday Night Heat) aired on USA Network, MTV and Spike TV in the United States, Channel 4 and Sky1 in the United Kingdom and CTV Sportsnet in Canada. It was most recently streamed on WWE.com on Friday afternoons for North American viewers. However, the show was still televised internationally and showed in the United Kingdom on Sky Sports 3, Australia on Fox8, India on TEN Sports, Germany on Premiere Sport Portal, France on Action, Spain on Sportmania and C+ Deportes -both channels from Digital +, the Middle East on ShowSports4, the Philippines on Jack TV, and Japan on J SPORTS. The final episode was uploaded to WWE.com on May 30, 2008. The show was replaced internationally with WWE Vintage Collection, a program showing classic WWE matches.

==== Jakked and Metal (1999–2002) ====
WWF Jakked and WWF Metal are television programs that were produced by the WWF. Both shows aired syndicated weekly from 1999 until 2002 and replaced Shotgun Saturday Night.

==== Velocity (2002–2006) ====
Premiering in 2002, Velocity became to the SmackDown brand what Heat was to the Raw brand. Velocity aired Saturday nights on Spike TV until 2005 and continued (like Heat) as a webcast on WWE.com and continued airing on international broadcasters. Velocity ended its run in 2006.

==== Tribute to the Troops (2003–2023) ====
WWE Tribute to the Troops was an annual American professional wrestling event held by WWE and Armed Forces Entertainment. The show aired as a television special during the month of December.

==== A.M. Raw (2005–2014) ====
A.M. Raw was a one-hour, condensed version of WWE's flagship Monday Night Raw program that aired on Saturdays at 9:00am on the USA Network. The show was cancelled in October 2014.

==== ECW (2006–2010) ====
ECW is a professional wrestling television program for WWE, based on the Extreme Championship Wrestling (ECW) promotion that lasted from 1992 to 2001. The show's name also referred to the ECW brand, in which WWE employees were assigned to work and perform, complementary to WWE's other brands, Raw and SmackDown. It debuted on June 13, 2006, on Sci Fi Channel in the United States and ran for close to four years until it aired its final episode on February 16, 2010, on the rebranded Syfy.

==== FCW (2008–2012) ====
FCW is a professional wrestling television program for World Wrestling Entertainment and the flagship show of WWE's developmental territory Florida Championship Wrestling. The program debuted on October 5, 2008 on the Bright House Sports Network and ran for nearly four years before airing its final episode on July 15, 2012.

==== Superstars (2009–2016) ====
WWE Superstars is a professional wrestling television program that was produced by WWE, that originally aired on WGN America in the United States and later broadcast on the WWE Network. It debuted on April 16, 2009, and ended its domestic broadcasting after 398 episodes on November 25, 2016.

==== Saturday Morning Slam (2012–2013) ====
WWE Saturday Morning Slam is a professional wrestling television program by WWE that was catered to the children's demographic. Saturday Morning Slam aired on The CW Vortexx programming block on Saturday mornings, and was rated TV-G. As a result, moves that targeted the head or neck were banned. It was cancelled in 2013, airing its final episode on May 11, 2013.

==== 205 Live (2016–2022) ====
205 Live is a weekly show that aired on the WWE Network in the U.S. and on television internationally featuring WWE's cruiserweight division.

==== Mixed Match Challenge (2018) ====
Mixed Match Challenge is a seasonal show that features mixed tag team matches.

==== NXT UK (2018–2022) ====
NXT UK is a weekly show that aired on the WWE Network in the United States and on television internationally featuring WWE's United Kingdom-based brand.

==== NXT Level Up (2022–2024) ====
NXT Level Up is a weekly show that aired on the WWE Network in the United States and on television internationally.

==== Speed (2024–2025) ====
WWE Speed is a weekly WWE video series that aired exclusively on X (formerly Twitter) with new episodes posting on Wednesdays, featuring time limited matches.

=== Other shows ===
==== Tuesday Night Titans (1984–1986) ====
Tuesday Night Titans (abbreviated TNT) aired on the USA Network from 1984 to 1986 and was promoted as a variety show.

==== Hulk Hogan's Rock 'n' Wrestling (1985–1987) ====
Hulk Hogan's Rock 'n' Wrestling is an animated television series produced by the WWF and aired on CBS from September 14, 1985, to October 18, 1986, with reruns airing until June 27, 1987 The series was based on Hulk Hogan and various other WWF wrestlers.

==== Wrestling Spotlight (1986–1995) ====
WWF Wrestling Spotlight is syndicated from 1986 to 1995. The show was hosted by various personalities including Vince McMahon, Lord Alfred Hayes, Sean Mooney, Ian Mooney, Miss Elizabeth, and Sensational Sherri generally from a studio or control room and consisted primarily of matches from other WWF programming.

==== LiveWire (1996–2001) ====
WWF LiveWire is a WWF television program that aired Saturday mornings on the USA Network from September 21, 1996, to September 23, 2000, and on TNN from September 30, 2000, to August 18, 2001. The show was used to summarize the weekly events in WWF programming and featured interviews with WWF personalities and allowed the fans to phone-in and ask questions to in-studio guests.

==== Excess (2001–2002) ====
Excess is a wrestling talk (originally call-in) show that featured WWF guest superstars and divas. It ran from August 25, 2001, through May 18, 2002, although the show was originally proposed to become a WCW relaunch show.

It was originally hosted by Jonathan Coachman and Trish Stratus. Stratus, however, was replaced in late 2001 by Terri Runnels. The program showed classic matches from the WWF's archives, many of which were often taken from viewer suggestions. Starting on the April 6, 2002 episode, the first hour of the show stayed under the Excess name, and was hosted by Michael Cole and Marc Lloyd, who presented an hour of SmackDown highlights and news. The second hour was renamed Late Night Excess and was presented by Coachman and Raven. That show featured Raw highlights, though it lasted only over a month as it was replaced by WWE Velocity and WWE Confidential later in 2002.

The show was named "Worst Television Show" at the 2001 Wrestling Observer Newsletter awards.

==== Attitude (2001–2002) ====
Attitude is a magazine/highlight show that aired in Saturday prime time on The WB 100+ Station Group, designed to appeal to smaller towns ranked below the top 100 television markets in the United States. The series debuted September 8, 2001 and ran through May 2002.

==== Confidential (2002–2004) ====
WWE Confidential is a program that focused more on various behind-the-scenes subjects in the company. The program aired on TNN late Saturday nights, following Velocity, from 2002 to 2004 and was hosted by Gene Okerlund.

==== MSG Classics (2006–2009) ====
WWE Madison Square Garden Classics is a professional wrestling television program for World Wrestling Entertainment that aired on the MSG Network featuring most WWE matches from house shows, pay-per-views, and WWE Raw broadcasts that took place at Madison Square Garden. It debuted on July 12, 2006, and ran for three seasons until the last new episode aired on September 17, 2008. The MSG Network showed reruns of eight episodes from season three in 2009.

==== Legends of Wrestling (2006–2012) ====
Legends of Wrestling is an original series made specifically for WWE Classics on Demand service. The program features various "legends" of the business, for their work in and out of the ring, having a roundtable discussion about specific topics, persons, or occurrences in the history of wrestling.

==== 24X7 (2007) ====
WWE 24X7 is a professional wrestling television program by WWE that was catered to the children's demographic in India. The show aired matches from WWE library and premiered on 7 May 2007 on Jetix in India.

==== Vintage (2008–2023) ====
WWE Vintage is a professional wrestling television program from WWE showcasing action from the extensive WWE video library. The show was hosted by Gene Okerlund (2008–2012), Renee Young (2012–2018), Charly Caruso (2018), Scott Stanford (2018–2023), and Megan Morant (2023).

==== Slam City (2014) ====
WWE Slam City is an animated program by WWE that aired on Nicktoons and the WWE Network in the United States. The program aired in 2014 and involved various toyetic versions of WWE wrestlers.

==== Camp WWE (2016–2018) ====
Camp WWE is an adult animated short-form comedy series featuring WWE performers aired 2016. It was the final production produced by Film Roman before its closure in 2018.

==== WWE Backstage (2019–2021) ====
Backstage is a weekly studio television show produced by WWE and Fox Sports.

==== WWE’s The Bump (2019–2024) ====
WWE’s The Bump is a weekly talk show produced by WWE. It streamed live on WWE Network, as well as WWE's official YouTube channel, X (formerly Twitter) and Facebook pages.

==== The Big Show Show (2020) ====
The Big Show Show is a Netflix sitcom starring Big Show playing a fictional version of himself.

==== Dhamaal League (2020–2025) ====
Dhamaal League is a daily studio show produced by WWE for the Indian market.

==== Evil (2022) ====
Hosted by John Cena, WWE Evil is an eight-part docuseries on streaming service Peacock that examines WWE villains.

==== WWE: Next Gen (2024) ====
WWE: Next Gen is a professional wrestling documentary series produced by A. Smith & Co. Productions and WWE. The series premiered on The Roku Channel on April 1, 2024.

=== Recap shows ===
==== Mania (1993–1996) ====
WWF Mania is a WWF Saturday morning television program that aired on the USA Network between 1993 and 1996. The show recapped events that happened during the week in the WWF at the time and, in its earlier years, usually included an exclusive match.

==== Bottom Line (2002–2025) ====
Bottom Line is a weekly studio television show produced by WWE that recapped that week's episode of Raw.

==== Afterburn (2002–2025) ====
Afterburn is a weekly studio television show produced by WWE that recapped that week's episode of SmackDown.

==== Experience (2004–2020) ====
Experience is a weekly studio television show produced by WWE that summarised that week's episodes of Raw and SmackDown.

==== This Week in WWE (2009–2026) ====
This Week in WWE is a weekly studio show produced by WWE.

==== Action Mania (2015–2017) ====
Action Mania is a professional wrestling recap show produced by WWE that aired on Zee Cinema in Hindi exclusively in India.

==== Raw Sunday Dhamaal (2015–2017) ====
Raw Sunday Dhamaal is a professional wrestling recap and Talk show that was produced by WWE. Available in both Hindi and English, the program aired exclusively in India. It was replaced in 2017 by WWE Sunday Dhamaal.

==== WWE Sunday Dhamaal (2017–2025) ====
WWE Sunday Dhamaal is a weekly studio show produced by WWE for the Indian market.

==== Wal3ooha (2017–2025) ====
Wal3ooha is a weekly studio show produced by WWE for the Middle East and North Africa market.

==== Smack Talk (2022) ====
Hosts Booker T, Jackie Redmond, and Peter Rosenberg discuss the latest episodes of Biography: WWE Legends and WWE Rivals.

=== Reality shows ===
==== Tough Enough (2001–2015) ====
WWE Tough Enough is a professional wrestling reality television series produced by WWE, wherein participants undergo professional wrestling training and compete for a contract with WWE. The show followed a seasonal format and aired on multiple TV channels until its final season in 2015.

==== Diva Search (2003–2007) ====
WWE Diva Search is a talent competition that was produced by WWE; aired as part of Raw rather than a standalone program.

==== Total Divas (2013–2019) ====
Total Divas is a seasonal reality show broadcast on E!.

==== Total Bellas (2016–2021) ====
Total Bellas is a seasonal reality show on E! featuring the Bella Twins.

==== Miz & Mrs. (2018–2022) ====
Miz & Mrs. is a seasonal reality television show televised on the USA Network featuring The Miz and Maryse.

==== Fight Like a Girl (2020) ====
Fight Like a Girl is a reality show produced by WWE and Quibi.

==== Corey & Carmella (2022) ====
A seasonal reality show on WWE's YouTube channel featuring Corey Graves and Carmella.

==== Love & WWE: Bianca & Montez (2024) ====
Love & WWE: Bianca & Montez is a seasonal reality show broadcast on Hulu.

== See also ==
- List of WWE broadcasters
- List of professional wrestling television series
- List of Impact Wrestling programming
