= Todd Grisham =

American wrestling announcer (born 1976)

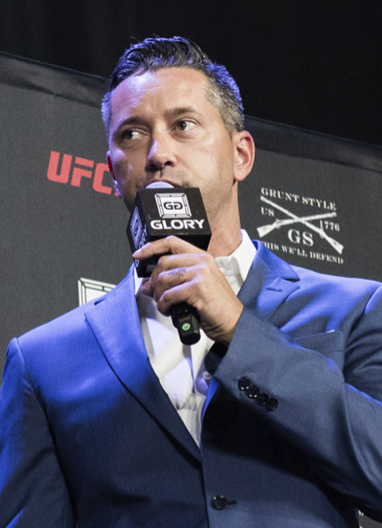
- Grisham in 2018

Personal information
- Born: January 9, 1976 (age 50) Hattiesburg, Mississippi, U.S.
- Spouses: Stephanie Grisham (m. 2004; div. 2006) Alyson DeRenzis (m. 2009)
- Children: 3
- Website: toddgrisham.com

Professional wrestling career
- Ring name: Todd Grisham
- Debut: 2004
- Retired: 2011

Todd Grisham (born January 9, 1976) is an American sports reporter for DAZN and Glory kickboxing. Prior to his departure from ESPN at the end of 2016, his duties for the network included being the in-studio host for Friday Night Fights as well as a SportsCenter anchor. He was previously a sports reporter for UFC from 2017 to 2020.

Prior to joining ESPN in 2011, Grisham worked as a professional wrestling commentator for WWE. As of January 2017, Grisham is working for the UFC as a broadcaster.

== Early life ==
Born in Hattiesburg, Mississippi, Grisham was raised in Bay Minette, Alabama, and attended Baldwin County High School for his freshman year, where he played on the school's soccer team as a forward. His family relocated several times after his freshman year, and Grisham graduated from Orange Park High School in Orange Park, Florida. Grisham attended Wingate University for one year on a soccer scholarship and later transferred to the University of West Georgia, where he received his degree in communications. His first professional job in the television industry was with KTVO of Ottumwa, Iowa, where he worked for a year and a half. He was then a sportscaster for KOLD-TV Tucson for approximately five years before signing a two-year contract with WWE as an announcer, officially joining them on January 14, 2004.

== Professional wrestling career ==
=== World Wrestling Entertainment/WWE ===
==== Voice of Heat, Byte This and Bottom Line (2004–2008) ====
Grisham debuted in WWE in 2004 as the voice of Heat, doing play-by-play alongside Jonathan Coachman, Josh Mathews, and others for just over four years. He had co-hosted Experience with Ivory, but after her release from WWE, he hosted it alone until mid-2006, when Josh Mathews took over. Grisham also hosted WWE's premier web show, Byte This!, which was canceled in 2006. In addition, he did backstage interviews for the Raw brand. In 2005 Grisham also began hosting Raw's catch-up program Bottom Line after Marc Loyd was released from the company, until September 2007.

==== ECW (2008–2009) ====
Grisham became the new play-by-play commentator for the ECW brand on the July 29, 2008 episode of ECW on Syfy, replacing Mike Adamle, and was paired with Tazz, who was the color commentator until Matt Striker took over. Grisham and Striker won the 2008 Slammy Award for Announce Team of the Year.

==== SmackDown, NXT and departure (2009–2011) ====
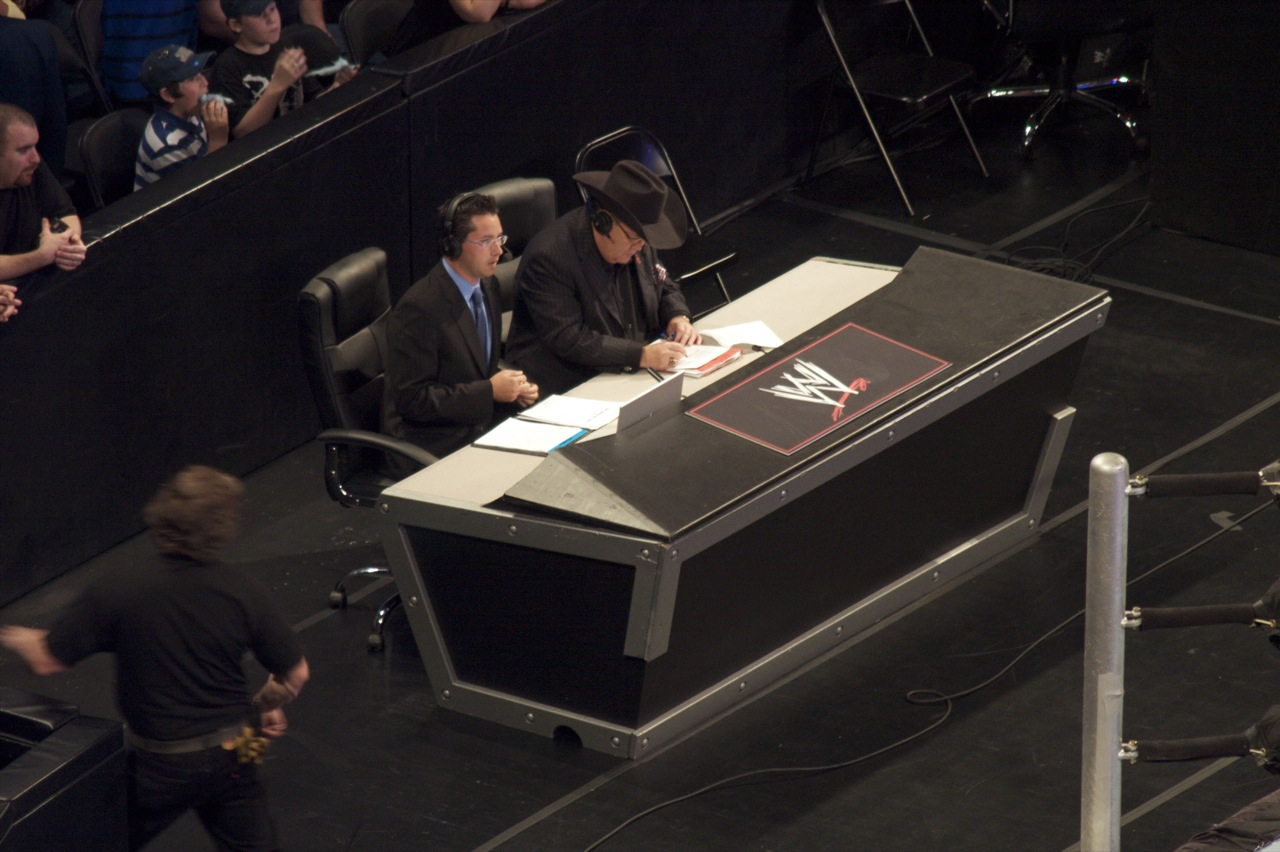
Grisham (left) during his run on SmackDown with fellow commentator Jim Ross.

On the April 7, 2009 episode of ECW, Josh Mathews became the new play-by-play commentator for ECW. Grisham was promoted to SmackDown play by play commentator, and debuted on April 10, 2009. On October 30, 2009, he was reunited with his ECW broadcasting partner Matt Striker. On December 10, 2010, Grisham was replaced as SmackDown's play-by-play commentator by Josh Mathews; Grisham replaced Michael Cole on NXT as play-by-play commentator and joined with Mathews. After becoming the lead play-by-play announcer for NXT for five months, he left; Grisham's last WWE appearance was on the August 26, 2011, edition of SmackDown.

== Sportscasting ==
In 2007, Grisham was named the host for Fox Soccer Channel's Major League Soccer broadcasts, working alongside Christopher Sullivan for pre-game and post-game coverage of the network's Saturday night broadcasts until 2010, later picking up announcing duties for WWE NXT.

On August 24, 2011, a day after serving as NXT play-by-play commentator for the final time, it was announced that Grisham would be joining ESPN.

On October 16, 2011, Grisham debuted as a co-anchor for ESPNEWS for the overnight hours of "Highlight Express", presenting live from 11p-2a ET and replayed until 7am ET. He was joined by Adnan Virk. He also did the morning sports updates for ABC's early morning program America This Morning and prepackaged reports for ABC O&O stations who do not have a morning sportscaster. He presented on ESPN again on October 18, co-presenting with Sara Walsh. He was named one of the official overnight anchors for ESPNEWS and alternated to present updates for the ABC stations and America This Morning. On October 22, 2011, Grisham inadvertently caused some minor internet outrage when he referred to the loss suffered by Oklahoma at the hands of Texas Tech as the "Trail of Tears". Grisham apologized for the gaffe.

On November 10, 2011, Grisham replaced Jon Anik as the host of MMA Live. On December 28, 2011, Todd made his SportsCenter debut, presenting SportsCenter from Bristol, Connecticut until 11:30pm, when ESPN's Los Angeles studios resume SportsCenter.

Grisham left ESPN at the end of 2016.

=== Glory (2016–present) ===
Todd Grisham joined the Glory broadcast team as a backstage and post-fight interviewer at Glory 30. He became a play-by-play announcer for the organization at Glory 35 Superfight Series. He continued his role as play-by-play announcer for Glory 36 Superfight Series and the Glory: Collision PPV.

=== Ultimate Fighting Championship (2017) ===
On January 3, 2017, it was announced that Grisham has been hired by UFC to work on the studio desk and in the play-by-play role for fights. His first assignment as the UFC’s play-by-play commentator was UFC Fight Night: Rodríguez vs. Penn. During the finale of The Ultimate Fighter: Redemption on July 7, 2017, Grisham mispronounced Kazushi Sakuraba’s name, who was in attendance. Since then, Grisham has not covered a UFC Event again. Grisham will work exclusively on Fox Sports 1, where he will serve as a studio host.

=== DAZN ===
On September 8, 2018, DAZN announced Grisham as an addition to their commentary team for boxing.

== Filmography ==
=== Film ===
Year	Title	Role	Notes	Ref.
2023	Creed III	Himself		

=== Video games ===
Year	Title	Role	Notes	Ref.
2024	Undisputed	Himself	With Johnny Nelson as commentating team Unless if Nelson fights as a Cruiserweight boxer	

== Awards and nominations ==
Year	Award	Category	Recipient(s)	Result	Ref.
2004	Wrestling Observer Newsletter	Worst Television Announcer	Himself	Won	
2006	Wrestling Observer Newsletter	Worst Television Announcer	Himself	Won	
2008	Slammy Award	Announce Team of the Year	Himself (with Matt Striker)	Won	
2023	Happy Punch Awards	Best Commentator	Himself	Pending	
