= WWE Bottom Line =

WWE television program

- Created by: Vince McMahon
- Presented by: Scott Stanford
- Country of origin: United States
- No. of episodes: 1104

Production
- Camera setup: Multicamera setup
- Running time: 60 minutes (including commercials)

Original release
- Network: Syndicated
- Release: May 24, 2002 – January 2, 2025

Related
- Afterburn; Experience; This Week; Vintage; Free For All

WWE Bottom Line, or simply Bottom Line, is an American syndicated television program which recaps the events which takes place on WWE's weekly flagship program, Raw. Along with Afterburn, it replaced WWE's previous highlight show, WWF LiveWire. Its name is a reference to the same catchphrase used by WWE legend, Stone Cold Steve Austin.

The show was originally broadcast domestically in the United States from May 24, 2002 to September 2005, when it was removed from domestic syndication. Following this, Bottom Line was broadcast in international markets to fulfill prior programming commitments. It was broadcast in Italy on Dplay Plus, in Spain on GOL, in Philippines on Solar Sports until 2025. In South Africa WWE Bottom Line aired on eKasi+.

On February 16, 2008, Bottom Line celebrated its 300th episode, just as its sister show Afterburn did on the next morning. On the December 17, 2011, Bottom Line celebrated its 500th episode, airing the 2011 Slammy Award matches and awards presentation. On July 22, 2021, Bottom Line celebrated its 1000th episode.The last episode aired internationally on January 2, 2025.

== Hosts ==
Year(s)	Hosts
2002–2003	Jonathan Coachman
2003–2005	Marc Lloyd
2005–2007	Todd Grisham
2007–2009	Jack Korpela
2009–2012	Scott Stanford
2012–2013	Renee Young and Tom Phillips
2013–2014	Scott Stanford
2014–2016	Kyle Edwards
2016	Cathy Kelley and Corey Graves
2016–2017	Cathy Kelley
2017–2021	Scott Stanford
2021–2022	Scott Stanford and Megan Morant
2022	Megan Morant
2022-2023	Scott Stanford
2023–2025	Scott Stanford and Megan Morant

=== Fill in guest hosts ===
Year(s)	Hosts
2003–2007	Jonathan Coachman
2012	Matt Striker
2023	Matt Camp

== Broadcast ==
WWE Bottom Line was broadcast in the United States from May 2002 to September 2005 when it was removed from syndication, however it was still aired in international markets to fulfill programming commitments until 2025, when the WWE international TV rights deals switched over to Netflix.

== See also ==
- WWE Afterburn
- List of current WWE programming
