= WWE Heat =

Professional wrestling television program

- Heat logo used from October 1, 2000 – May 30, 2008
- Also known as: Sunday Night Heat
- Genre: Professional wrestling
- Created by: Vince McMahon
- Country of origin: United States
- No. of seasons: 11
- No. of episodes: 513

Production
- Running time: 45 minutes (broadcast); 35 minutes (streaming)
- Production company: World Wrestling Federation/Entertainment

Original release
- Network: USA Network
- Release: August 2, 1998 – September 24, 2000
- Network: MTV
- Release: October 1, 2000 – March 30, 2003
- Network: The New TNN/Spike TV
- Release: February 23, 2003 – September 25, 2005
- Network: WWE.com (streaming)
- Release: September 30, 2005 – May 30, 2008

Related
- WWE Vintage Collection (2008–2023); WWE Velocity (2002–2006); WWE Superstars (2009–2016); WWE Main Event (2012–)

WWE Heat, or simply Heat, is an American professional wrestling broadcast and streaming television program produced by World Wrestling Entertainment (WWE) (Note: Originally produced under the World Wrestling Federation (WWF) banner before the company's renaming on May 6, 2002.) and aired from August 2, 1998, to May 30, 2008. It began under the name Sunday Night Heat (initially stylized as SuNDAY NiGHT HeAT) on USA Network as a secondary television show to the company's Monday Night Raw program, with storylines to the previous week's Raw being advanced. When the brand extension was introduced on March 25, 2002, Heat would serve as the supplementary show exclusive to the Raw brand, placing more focus on its mid-card performers and matches, and would be recorded before the week's television taping of Raw. In 2005, the show was repackaged as Heat and was streamed as a webcast in North America, with new episodes every Friday, while continuing on television in other regions.

Beginning with its first episode in 1998 and concluding in 2010, Heat has been taped in or broadcast from five different countries, primarily the United States but also in Canada, the United Kingdom, Japan in 2005, and Italy in 2007.

== Format ==
Sunday Night Heat logo used from August 2, 1998, to September 24, 2000

The show was originally introduced on the USA Network on August 2, 1998, in the United States. The one-hour show would be broadcast on Sunday nights, being taped earlier in the week after Raw. It was the second primary program of the WWF's weekly television show line-up, serving as a supplement to the Monday Night Raw program. Heat would feature a format similar to that of Monday Night Raw, in that continuing feuds from the previous week would progress during the show, and the following day's Monday Night Raw would be heavily promoted. On nights when the WWF was holding a pay-per-view event, a special edition of Heat was generally broadcast from the event's venue as a promotional pre-show, featuring previews and preliminary matches.

In August 1999, after the premiere of SmackDown!, Heat briefly became a complete weekly summary show, featuring occasional interviews and music videos. After only a few weeks following the format change, Heat began airing exclusive matches again. The debut of SmackDown! also led to Heat being taped before SmackDown!, with matches for WWF syndication programs like Jakked/Metal being taped before Raw broadcasts.

Occasionally, special editions of Heat were heavily promoted; during the halftime period of Super Bowl XXXIII in 1999, Heat aired a special half-hour edition dubbed Halftime Heat. These specials ended following the show's move to MTV in 2000. When Heat started airing on MTV in late 2000, it was broadcast live from WWF New York. WWF personalities and performers would appear at the restaurant as special guests while Michael Cole and Tazz provided commentary to matches.

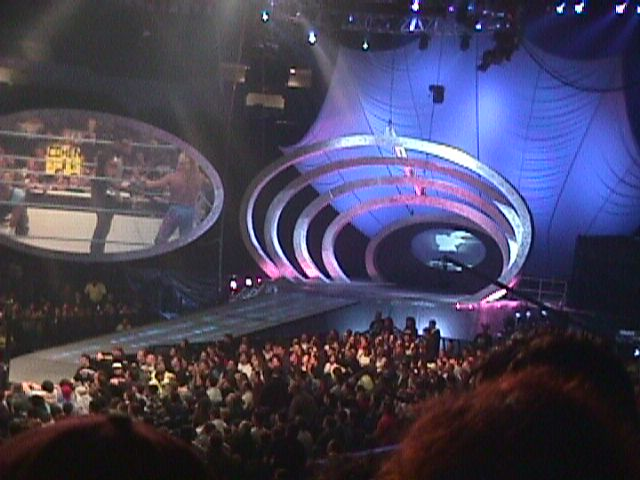
Heat used the set as shown on SmackDown! until 2001

In April 2002, the show returned to its original filming schedule, again before Raw. Eventually, the live from WWF New York format was retired. When the brand extension was implemented, Heat largely became a B-show for the Raw brand, focused on mid-card talent (sister channel TNN picked up Velocity to serve a similar purpose for SmackDown). In May 2002, the show was renamed WWE Sunday Night Heat due to the rebranding of the WWF.

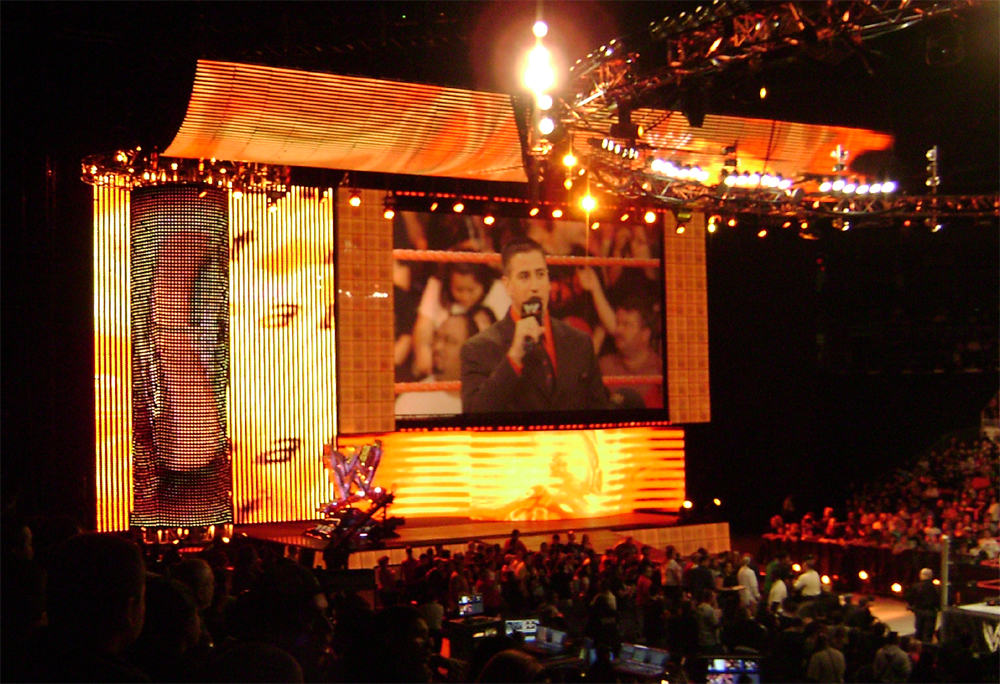
The Heat version of the universal WWE HD set introduced in January 2008

Heat and Velocity were not picked up by the USA Network when WWE moved its programming back there in October 2005, leaving Americans no way to watch WWE weekend shows on television. To solve this problem, WWE decided to stream the shows on their website exclusively for the American audience, with new editions posted every Friday afternoon. Additionally, prior to every PPV event, WWE would continue to air a live bonus 30-minute Heat pre-show on the PPV channel. Backlash 2006 would be the final PPV event to feature a live Heat pre-show before that particular version of Heat was discontinued. Sunday Night Heat was soon renamed to WWE Heat, as it no longer aired on Sundays.

Heat was still shown internationally to fulfill international programming commitments. When WWE went high definition in January 2008, Heat began using the same HD set as Raw, SmackDown, and ECW. After 10 years of programming and 513 episodes, the final episode of WWE Heat was uploaded to WWE.com on May 30, 2008. It was the most watched episode of Heat since it debuted on WWE.com. The show was replaced internationally with a new show featuring classic matches, called WWE Vintage Collection. At the 2019 Royal Rumble it was announced that WWE would be bringing back Halftime Heat featuring superstars from NXT during the Super Bowl LIII halftime show.

== Broadcast ==
It aired on USA Network (1998–2000), MTV (2000–2003), and TNN/Spike TV (2003–2005) in the United States and on CTV Sportsnet in Canada, before Heat was streamed on WWE.com on Friday afternoons for North American viewers from 2005 to 2008.

The United Kingdom's coverage of Heat began in January 2000, when Channel 4 started broadcasting the show at 4pm on Sundays, as a part of T4 – which also included broadcasting four WWF PPVs a year. These one-hour shows were a magazine-type show, usually featuring three or four brief matches as well as highlights from Raw and SmackDown!. As with the North American airing, exclusive matches taped before SmackDown! were aired on this version of the show. A separate commentary team was used on airings in the United Kingdom, with references aimed more at that specific audience. During commentary, Raw and SmackDown! were referred to as taking place on Friday and Saturday respectively, which were the days they were broadcast in the United Kingdom on Sky Sports – as opposed to the manner in which the two programs were often referred to by the North American broadcast dates of Monday and Thursday. The two-person announce team was a mix of individuals including Kevin Kelly, Michael Cole, Michael Hayes and Jonathan Coachman. During the middle of 2000, Heat started to get moved around the Channel 4 schedule, usually between the afternoon and midnight. Towards the end of 2000, the show was permanently moved to being broadcast in the early-hours of Monday mornings. The show stayed in the time-slot until December 2001 when Channel 4's deal with the WWF expired in the United Kingdom. Heat returned to the United Kingdom and Ireland in January 2003 on Sky One (with repeats on Sky Sports), though the coverage became Sky Sports exclusive in January 2005 along with most of WWE's programming.

Although Heat became a webcast in North America in 2005, it continued to be televised internationally and showed in the United Kingdom on Channel 4 and then later on Sky Sports 3, Australia on Fox8, India on TEN Sports, Germany on Premiere Sport Portal, France on Action, Spain on Sportmania and C+ Deportes -both channels from Digital+, the Middle East on ShowSports4, the Philippines on Jack TV, and Japan on J Sports. The final episode was uploaded to WWE.com.

On May 7, 2018, the first 52 episodes of WWE Heat were made available to stream on the WWE Network.

== Notable championship matches ==
Though the majority of title changes would take place on Raw, SmackDown!, or pay-per-view events, the WWF Championship changed hands on a special Halftime Heat that aired during the half-time of Super Bowl XXXIII on January 31, 1999, when Mankind defeated The Rock in an empty arena match to win the title. This special episode received the highest rating of Sunday Night Heat with a rating of 6.6.

Additionally, the Light Heavyweight Championship changed hands on Heat on three occasions. The first took place on the February 13, 2000 airing when Essa Rios (in his first appearance under that name and with the debuting Lita) defeated Gillberg. The second change saw Crash Holly defeat Dean Malenko on the March 18, 2001 episode. In the final change, the debuting Jerry Lynn defeated Crash Holly on a live edition before the Backlash pay-per-view on April 29, 2001.

== Commentators and hosts ==
There have been many commentators in the history of Heat. Industry veterans and Raw broadcasters Jim Ross and Jerry Lawler have done commentary on the show. The show was also the launchpad for Shane McMahon's on-camera career in WWE, originally placed in the role of a commentator for the program. In October 2000, the show was hosted by Rebecca Budig and MTV VJ/Rapper DJ Skribble when it moved from USA Network to MTV.

Often wrestlers would take the role of color commentators on the show with Al Snow, Tommy Dreamer, Raven, and D'Lo Brown all holding this position mostly as a replacement for an announcer who was unavailable. During the show's run on MTV, Diva Lita also served as a commentator following her major neck injury.

Before the WWE-produced Extreme Championship Wrestling reunion pay-per-view One Night Stand 2005 took place, a special Extreme Heat episode was broadcast and hosted by Jonathan Coachman and Michael Cole.

During one episode when Jonathan Coachman was unavailable, former ECW announcer (and then-lead Raw announcer) Joey Styles took part in the show. Styles then quit in storyline, however, on the following Monday's' Raw, meaning Grisham ran the show alone.

== Pre-show episodes ==
Starting with SummerSlam 1998 and ending with Backlash 2006, Heat aired special live episodes as the pre-show or countdown to several WWE pay-per-views.

=== 1998 ===
| Date | Event | Venue | Location | Main Event | Notes |
|---|---|---|---|---|---|
| August 30 | SummerSlam | Madison Square Garden | New York City, New York | The Disciples Of Apocalypse (8-Ball and Skull) (w/Paul Ellering) vs. Bradshaw and Vader | |
| September 27 | Breakdown: In Your House | Copps Coliseum | Hamilton, Ontario, Canada | 8-Ball vs. Billy Gunn vs. Skull in a triple threat match | |
| October 18 | Judgment Day: In Your House | Rosemont Horizon | Rosemont, Illinois | Scorpio vs. Jeff Jarrett | |
| November 15 | Survivor Series | Kiel Center | St. Louis, Missouri | Gangrel vs. Steve Blackman | |
| December 13 | Rock Bottom: In Your House | General Motors Place | Vancouver, British Columbia, Canada | The New Age Outlaws (Billy Gunn and The Road Dogg) vs. The Acolytes (Bradshaw and Faarooq) in a non-championship tag team match | |

=== 1999 ===
| Date | Event | Venue | Location | Main Event | Notes |
|---|---|---|---|---|---|
| January 24 | Royal Rumble | Arrowhead Pond of Anaheim | Anaheim, California | Mankind vs. Mabel (w/Shane McMahon) | |
| February 14 | St. Valentine's Day Massacre: In Your House | Memphis Pyramid | Memphis, Tennessee | Billy Gunn vs. Tiger Ali Singh | |
| March 28 | WrestleMania XV | First Union Center | Philadelphia, Pennsylvania | D-Lo Brown vs. Test vs. 8-Ball (w/Paul Ellering) vs. Animal vs. Bradshaw vs. Brian Christopher vs. Droz vs. Faarooq vs. Gillberg vs Hawk vs. Jeff Hardy vs Johnny Grunge vs. Matt Hardy vs. Mideon vs. Rocco Rock vs. Skull (w/Paul Ellering) vs. Steve Blackman vs. The Godfather vs. Tiger Ali Singh vs. Viscera in a WWF Tag Team Championship #1 contendership match | This was a battle royal where the final two participants would face the champions at WrestleMania later in the evening. |
| April 25 | Backlash | Providence Civic Center | Providence, Rhode Island | Test (w/Big Boss Man) vs. Viscera | |
| May 23 | Over the Edge | Kemper Arena | Kansas City, Missouri | Mideon (w/Bradshaw, Faarooq, Big Boss Man, and Viscera) vs. Vince McMahon (w/Gerald Brisco and Pat Patterson) | |
| June 27 | King of the Ring | Greensboro Coliseum | Greensboro, North Carolina | Ken Shamrock vs. Shane McMahon | |
| July 25 | Fully Loaded | Marine Midland Arena | Buffalo, New York | Christian vs. Viscera | |
| December 12 | Armageddon | National Car Rental Center | Sunrise, Florida | Al Snow vs. Test | |

=== 2000 ===
| Date | Event | Venue | Location | Main Event | Notes |
|---|---|---|---|---|---|
| November 19 | Survivor Series | Ice Palace | Tampa, Florida | Val Venis (w/Bull Buchanan, Christian, Edge, Steven Richards, and The Godfather) vs. Jeff Hardy (w/Buh Buh Ray Dudley, D-Von Dudley, and Matt Hardy) | |
| December 10 | Armageddon | Birmingham–Jefferson Civic Center | Birmingham, Alabama | Scotty 2 Hotty (w/Grandmaster Sexay) vs. D-Lo Brown (w/Chaz and Tiger Ali Singh) | |

=== 2001 ===
| Date | Event | Venue | Location | Main Event | Notes |
|---|---|---|---|---|---|
| January 21 | Royal Rumble | New Orleans Arena | New Orleans, Louisiana | Lo Down (Chaz and D-Lo Brown) (w/Tiger Ali Singh) vs. Kai En Tai (Funaki and Taka Michinoku) | |
| February 25 | No Way Out | Thomas & Mack Center | Paradise, Nevada | Rikishi vs. Matt Hardy (w/Lita) | |
| April 1 | WrestleMania X-Seven | Reliant Astrodome | Houston, Texas | The X-Factor (Justin Credible and X-Pac) (w/Albert) vs. Grandmaster Sexay and Steve Blackman | |
| April 29 | Backlash | Allstate Arena | Rosemont, Illinois | Lita vs. Molly Holly | |
| May 20 | Judgment Day | ARCO Arena | Sacramento, California | Crash Holly and Hardcore Holly (w/Molly Holly) vs. Kai En Tai (Funaki and Taka Michinoku) | |
| June 24 | King of the Ring | Continental Airlines Arena | East Rutherford, New Jersey | Matt Hardy (c) vs. Justin Credible for the WWF European Championship | |
| July 22 | Invasion | Gund Arena | Cleveland, Ohio | Chavo Guerrero Jr. vs. Scotty 2 Hotty | |
| August 19 | SummerSlam | Compaq Center | San Jose, California | Jacqueline, Lita, and Molly Holly vs. Ivory, Stacy Keibler, and Torrie Wilson | |
| September 23 | Unforgiven | Mellon Arena | Pittsburgh, Pennsylvania | Billy Gunn vs. Tommy Dreamer | |
| October 21 | No Mercy | Savvis Center | St. Louis, Missouri | Billy Kidman (c) vs. Scotty 2 Hotty for the WCW Cruiserweight Championship | |
| November 18 | Survivor Series | Greensboro Coliseum | Greensboro, North Carolina | Justin Credible, Lance Storm, and Raven vs. Albert, Scotty 2 Hotty, and Spike Dudley | |

=== 2002 ===
| Date | Event | Venue | Location | Main Event | Notes |
|---|---|---|---|---|---|
| February 17 | No Way Out | Bradley Center | Milwaukee, Wisconsin | Diamond Dallas Page (c) vs. Big Boss Man for the WWF European Championship | |
| March 17 | WrestleMania X8 | SkyDome | Toronto, Ontario, Canada | Albert, Rikishi and Scotty 2 Hotty vs. Lance Storm, Mr. Perfect and Test in a six-man tag team match | |
| April 21 | Backlash | Kemper Arena | Kansas City, Missouri | Big Show vs. Justin Credible and Steven Richards in a handicap match | |
| May 19 | Judgment Day | Gaylord Entertainment Center | Nashville, Tennessee | William Regal (c) vs. D'Lo Brown for the WWE European Championship | |
| June 23 | King of the Ring | Nationwide Arena | Columbus, Ohio | The Hardy Boyz (Jeff Hardy and Matt Hardy) vs. Raven and Steven Richards | |
| July 21 | Vengeance | Joe Louis Arena | Detroit, Michigan | Goldust vs. Steven Richards | |
| August 25 | SummerSlam | Nassau Veterans Memorial Coliseum | Uniondale, New York | Spike Dudley vs. Steven Richards | |
| September 22 | Unforgiven | Staples Center | Los Angeles, California | Rey Mysterio vs. Chavo Guerrero | |
| October 20 | No Mercy | Alltel Center | North Little Rock, Arkansas | The Hurricane vs. Steven Richards | |
| November 17 | Survivor Series | Madison Square Garden | New York City, New York | Goldust and The Hurricane vs. Lance Storm and William Regal | |
| December 15 | Armageddon | Office Depot Center | Sunrise, Florida | Jeff Hardy vs. D'Lo Brown | |

=== 2003 ===
| Date | Event | Venue | Location | Main Event | Notes |
|---|---|---|---|---|---|
| January 19 | Royal Rumble | FleetCenter | Boston, Massachusetts | Spike Dudley vs. Steven Richards | |
| February 23 | No Way Out | Bell Centre | Montreal, Quebec, Canada | Rey Mysterio vs. Jamie Noble | |
| March 30 | WrestleMania XIX | Safeco Field | Seattle, Washington | Chief Morley and Lance Storm (c) vs. Kane and Rob Van Dam for the World Tag Team Championship | |
| April 27 | Backlash | Worcester Centrum | Worcester, Massachusetts | Scott Steiner vs. Rico | |
| May 18 | Judgment Day | Charlotte Coliseum | Charlotte, North Carolina | The Hurricane vs. Steven Richards | |
| June 15 | Bad Blood | Compaq Center | Houston, Texas | Ivory vs. Molly Holly | |
| July 27 | Vengeance | Pepsi Center | Denver, Colorado | Último Dragón vs. Chris Kanyon | |
| August 24 | SummerSlam | America West Arena | Phoenix, Arizona | Rey Mysterio (c) vs. Shannon Moore for the WWE Cruiserweight Championship | |
| September 21 | Unforgiven | GIANT Center | Hershey, Pennsylvania | Maven vs. Steven Richards | |
| October 19 | No Mercy | First Mariner Arena | Baltimore, Maryland | Billy Kidman vs. Shannon Moore | |
| November 16 | Survivor Series | American Airlines Center | Dallas, Texas | Tajiri (c) vs. Jamie Noble for the WWE Cruiserweight Championship | |
| December 14 | Armageddon | TD Waterhouse Centre | Orlando, Florida | Jon Heidenreich vs. Rico | |

=== 2004 ===
| Date | Event | Venue | Location | Main Event | Notes |
|---|---|---|---|---|---|
| January 25 | Royal Rumble | Wachovia Center | Philadelphia, Pennsylvania | Victoria vs. Molly Holly | |
| February 15 | No Way Out | Cow Palace | Daly City, California | Tajiri, Akio and Sakoda vs. Billy Kidman, Paul London and Último Dragón in a six-man tag team match | |
| April 18 | Backlash | Rexall Place | Edmonton, Alberta, Canada | Val Venis vs. Matt Hardy | |
| May 16 | Judgment Day | Staples Center | Los Angeles, California | Mark Jindrak vs. Funaki | |
| June 13 | Bad Blood | Nationwide Arena | Columbus, Ohio | Batista vs. Maven | |
| June 27 | The Great American Bash | Norfolk Scope | Norfolk, Virginia | Spike Dudley vs. Jamie Noble | |
| July 11 | Vengeance | Hartford Civic Center | Hartford, Connecticut | Tyson Tomko vs. Val Venis | |
| August 15 | SummerSlam | Air Canada Centre | Toronto, Ontario, Canada | Rob Van Dam vs. Rene Dupree | |
| September 12 | Unforgiven | Rose Garden Arena | Portland, Oregon | Maven vs. Rodney Mack | |
| October 3 | No Mercy | Continental Airlines Arena | East Rutherford, New Jersey | Mark Jindrak vs. Scotty 2 Hotty | |
| November 14 | Survivor Series | Gund Arena | Cleveland, Ohio | La Résistance (Robért Conway and Sylvain Grenier) vs. The Hurricane and Rosey | |
| December 12 | Armageddon | Gwinnett Center | Atlanta, Georgia | Akio and Billy Kidman vs. Chavo Guerrero and Paul London | |

=== 2005 ===
| Date | Event | Venue | Location | Main Event | Notes |
|---|---|---|---|---|---|
| January 30 | Royal Rumble | Save Mart Center | Fresno, California | Maven vs. Rhyno | |
| February 20 | No Way Out | Mellon Arena | Pittsburgh, Pennsylvania | Charlie Haas and Hardcore Holly vs. Kenzo Suzuki and Rene Dupree | |
| May 1 | Backlash | Verizon Wireless Arena | Manchester, New Hampshire | Tyson Tomko vs. Val Venis | |
| May 22 | Judgment Day | Target Center | Minneapolis, Minnesota | Nunzio vs. Akio | |
| June 26 | Vengeance | Thomas & Mack Center | Paradise, Nevada | The Hurricane and Rosey (c) versus The Heart Throbs (Antonio and Romeo) for the World Tag Team Championship | |
| July 24 | The Great American Bash | HBSC Arena | Buffalo, New York | Paul London (c) vs. Nunzio for the WWE Cruiserweight Championship | |
| August 21 | SummerSlam | MCI Center | Washington, D.C. | Chris Masters vs. The Hurricane | |
| September 18 | Unforgiven | Ford Center | Oklahoma City, Oklahoma | Rob Conway vs. Tajiri | |
| October 9 | No Mercy | Toyota Center | Houston, Texas | Paul Burchill and William Regal vs. Paul London and Brian Kendrick | |
| November 1 | Taboo Tuesday | iPayOne Center | San Diego, California | Kerwin White and Matt Striker vs. Shelton Benjamin and Val Venis | |
| November 27 | Survivor Series | Joe Louis Arena | Detroit, Michigan | Juventud vs. Simon Dean | |
| December 18 | Armageddon | Dunkin' Donuts Center | Providence, Rhode Island | Jamie Noble vs. Funaki | |

=== 2006 ===
| Date | Event | Venue | Location | Main Event | Notes |
|---|---|---|---|---|---|
| January 8 | New Year's Revolution | Pepsi Arena | Albany, New York | Chavo Guerrero vs. Snitsky | |
| January 29 | Royal Rumble | American Airlines Arena | Miami, Florida | Finlay vs. Brian Kendrick | |
| February 19 | No Way Out | 1st Mariner Arena | Baltimore, Maryland | The Boogeyman vs. Simon Dean | |
| April 30 | Backlash | Rupp Arena | Lexington, Kentucky | Goldust vs. Rob Conway | |

== Other media ==
A PlayStation game based on the franchise was planned but cancelled before release due to the poorer than expected sales of other PlayStation wrestling games. The game was going to feature a star studded cast including Sunday Night Heat regulars such as Al Snow and Val Venis.

== See also ==
- WWE Superstars
- WWE Raw
- WWE Velocity
- WWE Bottom Line
- WWE Experience
