= WWE Backstage =

Professional wrestling studio show (2019–2021)

- Genre: Professional wrestling
- Presented by: Renee Young; Booker T
- Original language: English
- No. of seasons: 2
- No. of episodes: 37

Production
- Camera setup: Multicamera setup
- Running time: 60 minutes
- Production company: WWE

Original release
- Network: Fox Sports 1
- Release: November 5, 2019 – January 30, 2021

WWE Backstage was a professional wrestling studio show that was broadcast live every Tuesday night at 11:00 PM EST on FS1. The show was hosted by Renee Young and Booker T.

The show premiered on November 5, 2019 with special preview episodes airing on October 15, 2019 and October 25, 2019. On March 13, 2020, filming of the show was halted due to the COVID-19 pandemic. Because of that, the show still aired where Renee and Booker, along with the contributors and guests, discussed the entire issues of WWE from their own homes. The show also aired special episodes, where Renee, alongside the contributors and guests, re-watch their own favorite matches from the WWE Network archives called Watch With, which aired exclusively on YouTube. On June 22, 2020, FS1 announced that the show will not be a weekly show anymore and production of the show was suspended. On January 21, 2021, WWE announced a special episode on January 30 about the upcoming Royal Rumble event.

== Premise ==
WWE Backstage was hosted by Renee Young and Booker T, who discuss the biggest news and stories in the WWE along with input from other contributors and analysts.

== Segments ==
WWE Backstage featured many recurring segments and bits that are popular to its fans including:

- Promo School
- The Satin Sheet
- Social Media SmackDown
- Wrestling With Your Feelings
- The Main Event

== On-air personnel ==
The on-air personnel featured on WWE Backstage includes:

=== Hosts ===
- Renee Young
- Booker T

=== Frequent contributors ===
- Christian
- Paige
- CM Punk
- Ember Moon
- Mark Henry
- Samoa Joe
- Becky Lynch
- Adam Cole
- Ryan Satin
- Rachel Bonnetta
