= SummerSlam (2003) =

World Wrestling Entertainment pay-per-view event

- Promotional poster featuring Sable
- Promotion: World Wrestling Entertainment
- Brand(s): Raw; SmackDown!
- Date: August 24, 2003
- City: Phoenix, Arizona, US
- Venue: America West Arena
- Attendance: 16,113
- Buy rate: 415,000

Pay-per-view chronology
| ← Previous; Vengeance | Next → Unforgiven |

SummerSlam chronology
| ← Previous; 2002 | Next → 2004 |

The 2003 SummerSlam was a professional wrestling pay-per-view (PPV) event produced by World Wrestling Entertainment (WWE). It was the 16th annual SummerSlam, and took place on August 24, 2003, at the America West Arena in Phoenix, Arizona, United States, held for wrestlers from the promotion's Raw and SmackDown! brand divisions.

Seven professional wrestling matches were set on the event's supercard, a scheduling of multiple high-level matches. The first main event, which was for Raw, was an Elimination Chamber match in which Triple H defeated Chris Jericho, Goldberg, Kevin Nash, Randy Orton, and Shawn Michaels to retain the World Heavyweight Championship. In the other main event, which was for SmackDown!, Kurt Angle, the defending WWE Champion, defeated Brock Lesnar in a standard wrestling match. The undercard included a bout from Raw in which Kane defeated Rob Van Dam in a No Holds Barred match, and Eddie Guerrero retained SmackDown!'s United States Championship against Chris Benoit, Rhyno, and Tajiri. There was also a match that occurred on the Sunday Night Heat pre-show.

The event marked the second time the Elimination Chamber format was used by WWE; the first was at Survivor Series 2002. SummerSlam grossed over US$715,000 ticket sales from an attendance of 16,113, and received about 415,000 pay-per-view buys, more than the following year's event. This event helped WWE increase its pay-per-view revenue by $6.2 million from the previous year.

== Production ==
=== Background ===
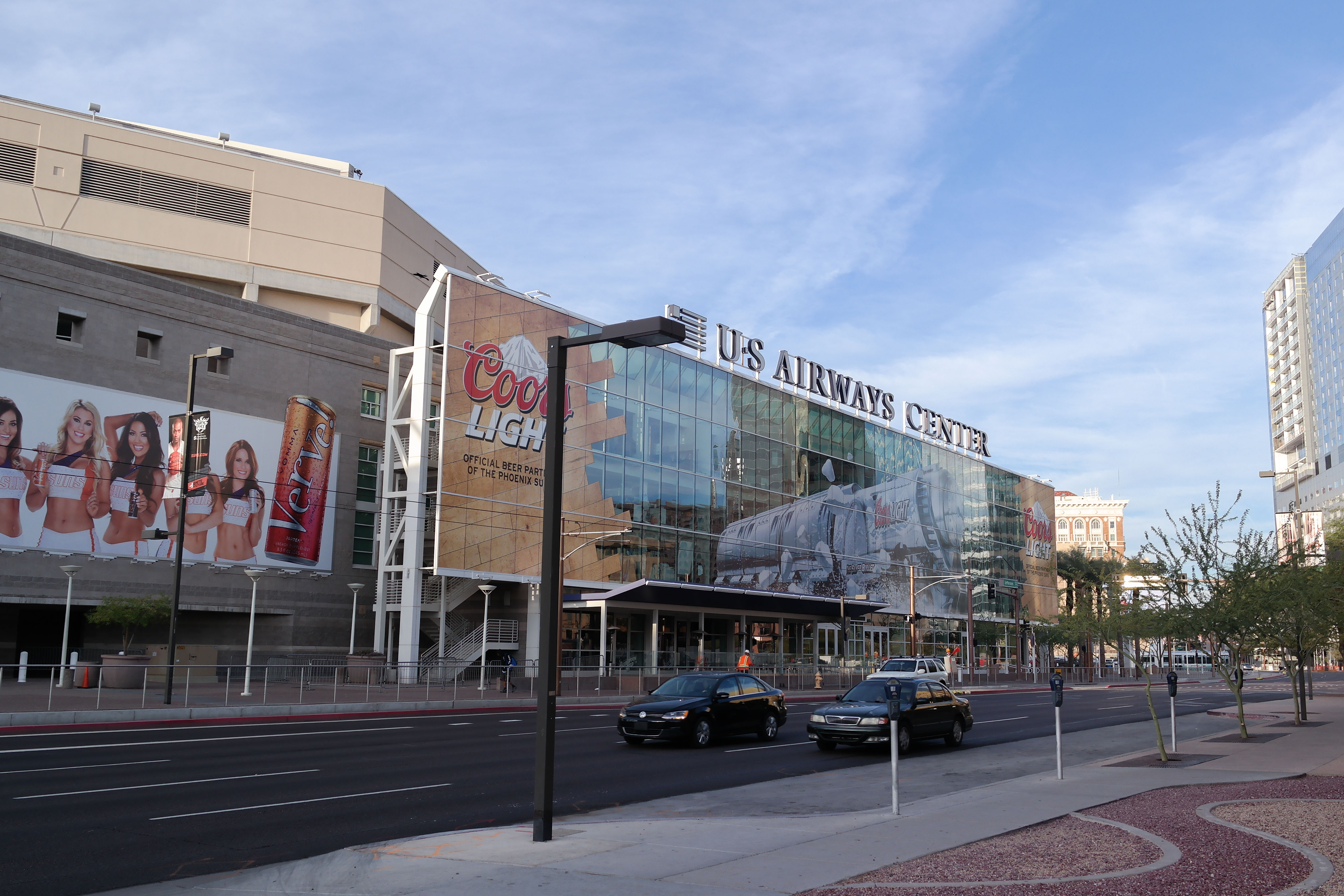
The event was held at the America West Arena in Phoenix, Arizona.

SummerSlam is an annual professional wrestling pay-per-view (PPV) event produced every August by World Wrestling Entertainment (WWE) since 1988. Dubbed "The Biggest Party of the Summer", it is one of the promotion's original four pay-per-views, along with WrestleMania, Royal Rumble, and Survivor Series, referred to as the "Big Four". It has since become considered WWE's second biggest event of the year behind WrestleMania. The 16th SummerSlam was scheduled to be held on August 24, 2003, at the America West Arena in Phoenix, Arizona and featured wrestlers from the Raw and SmackDown! brands. It was the first SummerSlam to feature the World Heavyweight Championship, following its establishment for Raw in September 2002 after the WWE Undisputed Championship became exclusive to SmackDown! and renamed as WWE Championship.

=== Storylines ===
The professional wrestling matches at SummerSlam featured professional wrestlers performing as characters in scripted events pre-determined by the hosting promotion, WWE. Storylines between the characters were produced on WWE's weekly television shows, Raw and SmackDown!, with the Raw and SmackDown! brands—storyline divisions in which WWE assigned its independent contractors to different programs.

In the first main event of SummerSlam, wrestlers from the Raw brand competed in an Elimination Chamber match. The match was contested for the World Heavyweight Championship, in which Triple H defended the title against Chris Jericho, Goldberg, Kevin Nash, Randy Orton, and Shawn Michaels. The buildup to the match began on July 22, when during the SummerSlam press conference, the Raw co-general manager, Eric Bischoff, announced that Triple H would defend the World Heavyweight Championship against Goldberg in a singles match at SummerSlam. On the August 4 episode of Raw, Bischoff changed the stipulations of the match to No disqualification regulations. Later during the episode, co-general manager "Stone Cold" Steve Austin altered Bischoff's announcement, stating that the World Heavyweight Championship would be contested in an Elimination Chamber match, with Triple H defending his title against Goldberg, Jericho, Nash, Orton, and Michaels. On the August 18 episode of Raw, the rivalry among the six competitors intensified during a promo, in which each participant in the Elimination Chamber discussed the match, and taunted the other wrestlers. During the show's main event, in which Orton wrestled Goldberg, Nash interfered in the match, and attacked Goldberg. Michaels then came down to the ring, but as he was about to hit Triple H with the World Heavyweight Championship belt, Jericho ran into the ring, and hit Michaels with a chair.

The second main event resulted from events on the SmackDown! brand. In the match, Kurt Angle defended his WWE Championship against Brock Lesnar. The build-up to the match began on the July 31 episode of SmackDown!. During an interview promotion in the ring, Lesnar challenged Angle to a rematch after Angle won the WWE Championship from him at Vengeance in a triple threat match (also involving Big Show). Vince McMahon decided that Lesnar would have to earn his rematch by competing in a steel cage match against McMahon himself with Angle officiating as a special guest referee. On the August 7 episode of SmackDown!, the steel cage match resulted in neither wrestler winning the match, after Lesnar attacked Angle, and formed an alliance with McMahon. On the August 14 episode of SmackDown!, McMahon announced that Angle would defend the WWE Championship against Lesnar at SummerSlam.

In a preliminary match involving wrestlers from the Raw brand, Rob Van Dam wrestled Kane under No disqualification regulations. The events leading up to this match began on the June 23 episode of Raw, when Kane took his mask off, and exposed his face in front of Van Dam, and the crowd after he lost to Triple H in a match for the World Heavyweight Championship (which was the stipulation) before chokeslamming Van Dam. On the July 7 episode of Raw, Kane attacked Van Dam backstage. On the July 14 episode of Raw, Eric Bischoff granted Van Dam a standard match against Kane, which took place on the July 21 episode of Raw, and ended in neither wrestler winning the match. On the August 4 episode of Raw, Shane McMahon scheduled a No Disqualification match between Kane, and Van Dam for SummerSlam.

In another preliminary match, wrestlers from the SmackDown! brand competed in a fatal four-way match for the WWE United States Championship: Eddie Guerrero defended the title against Chris Benoit, Rhyno, and Tajiri. The buildup to the match began with two different rivalries; one between Guerrero, and Tajiri, and the other between Benoit, and Rhyno. On the August 7 episode of SmackDown!, Guerrero, and Benoit wrestled in a standard match. However, during the match, Rhyno, and Tajiri interfered, resulting in neither wrestler winning the match. Sgt. Slaughter, a WWE official, scheduled a tag team match between Guerrero, and Rhyno, and Benoit, and Tajiri, which Benoit, and Tajiri won. On the August 14 episode of SmackDown!, it was announced that Guerrero would defend the WWE United States Championship against Benoit, Rhyno, and Tajiri at SummerSlam.

== Event ==
Other on-screen personnel
| Role: | Name: |
|---|---|
| English commentators | Jim Ross (Raw) |
| English commentators | Jerry Lawler (Raw) |
| English commentators | Michael Cole (SmackDown!) |
| English commentators | Tazz (SmackDown!) |
| Spanish commentators | Carlos Cabrera |
| Spanish commentators | Hugo Savinovich |
| Interviewers | Jonathan Coachman |
| Interviewers | Terri Runnels |
| Ring announcers | Howard Finkel (Raw) |
| Ring announcers | Tony Chimel (SmackDown!) |
| Referees | Charles Robinson (Raw) |
| Referees | Nick Patrick (Raw) |
| Referees | Chad Patton (Raw) |
| Referees | Earl Hebner (Raw) |
| Referees | Jack Doan (Raw) |
| Referees | Mike Chioda (SmackDown!) |
| Referees | Brian Hebner (SmackDown!) |
| Referees | Mike Sparks (SmackDown!) |

=== Sunday Night Heat ===
Before the event aired live on pay-per-view, Matt Hardy faced Zach Gowen on Sunday Night Heat. Gowen, however, was unable to compete due to kayfabe injuries he sustained at the hands of Brock Lesnar on the August 21, 2003 edition of SmackDown!. As a result, Hardy was declared the winner via forfeit.

In the next match, Rey Mysterio faced Shannon Moore for the WWE Cruiserweight Championship, in which Mysterio pinned Moore to retain the title after he performed 619.

=== Preliminary matches ===
After Sunday Night Heat, the pay-per-view event began with a tag team match for the World Tag Team Championship. The champions, La Résistance (René Duprée and Sylvain Grenier), defended their titles against The Dudley Boyz (Bubba Ray Dudley and D-Von Dudley). Throughout the match, both teams performed many offensive maneuvers, though The Dudley Boyz were able to gain the upper hand when they executed a 3D on Duprée. As D-Von covered Duprée, Rob Conway, who was disguised as a cameraman, hit D-Von with a camera while the referee was distracted. Duprée then covered D-Von for a successful pinfall to retain the championship.

The following match pitted The Undertaker against A-Train in a standard match. In the early stages, both competitors wrestled inconclusively before The Undertaker gained the advantage. He attempted to lift A-Train for a Tombstone piledriver. A-Train countered it, while in the process, knocking the referee down. He attempted to take advantage of the situation by trying to hit The Undertaker with a steel chair. The Undertaker, however, countered the attack with his boot, causing the chair to hit A-Train in the face. The Undertaker then chokeslammed A-Train, and, since the referee had recuperated, covered his opponent for the pinfall. After the match, Sable tried to seduce The Undertaker, but was grabbed by the throat, and then was attacked by a returning Stephanie McMahon.

The third match was Shane McMahon against Eric Bischoff. McMahon, and Bischoff began by brawling on the arena ramp, as Jonathan Coachman appeared from the backstage area, and hit McMahon with a steel chair. Bischoff grabbed a microphone, and announced that the match would be contested under no disqualification, falls count anywhere regulations. Coachman, and Bischoff performed double-team attacks on McMahon until "Stone Cold" Steve Austin interfered by performing a Stone Cold Stunner on Coachman, and Bischoff. After Austin's interference, McMahon positioned Bischoff on the spanish television commentators' table, performed a Leap of Faith onto Bischoff's chest, thereby breaking the table, and covered Bischoff for the pinfall.

The next match was a Fatal 4-Way match for the WWE United States Championship; Eddie Guerrero defended the title against Chris Benoit, Rhyno, and Tajiri. The match began with Guerrero wrestling with Tajiri, while Benoit wrestled with Rhyno. During the encounter, Guerrero applied a Lasso From El Passo on Tajiri, while Benoit employed a Crippler Crossface on Rhyno. Afterwards, Tajiri applied a Tarantula on Benoit. The hold distracted the referee, which allowed Guerrero to hit Rhyno with the United States Championship belt. Tajiri then attempted to hit Benoit with a Buzzsaw Kick, but Benoit countered the maneuver by lifting, and sitting Tajiri onto his shoulders. Tajiri, however, countered by tossing both himself, and Benoit over the top rope onto the arena floor. Capitalizing on the situation, Guerrero then performed a Frog splash on Rhyno, after which he scored the pinfall, thus retaining the WWE United States Championship.

=== Main event matches ===
The fifth match was a match for the WWE Championship, in which Kurt Angle defended the title against Brock Lesnar. At the beginning of the match, Lesnar tried to walk away from the ring, but Angle brought him back. There, Angle performed many offensive maneuvers, including a DDT, and the Angle Slam. He then applied an ankle lock on Lesnar. During this tussle, Lesnar countered the hold, but knocked down the referee. Angle applied a guillotine choke on Lesnar, which brought Lesnar down onto his knees, and allowed Angle to perform another ankle lock. Mr. McMahon interfered, came into the ring, and hit Angle's back with a steel chair to break the submission hold. Because the referee was incapacitated, Lesnar was not disqualified for the interference. Afterwards, Lesnar twice attempted to lift Angle onto his shoulders for an F-5. During the second attempt, however, Angle countered the throw into another ankle lock, which forced Lesnar to tap out. As a result, Angle retained the WWE Championship. After the match, Angle slammed McMahon through a chair.

In the sixth match, Kane faced Rob Van Dam in a No Holds Barred match. Both wrestlers used the steel folding ladder to their advantage early in the match. After Kane used the ladder on Van Dam, he attempted to hit Van Dam with a flying clothesline. However, Van Dam moved out of the way, and Kane landed on the arena barricade. Van Dam performed a variation of a rolling thunder on Kane, using a steel folding chair. Following this, Van Dam attempted to hit Kane with a Van Daminator with the steel chair, but Kane rolled out of the ring to avoid the attack. Van Dam then attempted an aerial technique from inside the ring towards Kane, but Kane caught Van Dam in mid-air, and executed an Tombstone Piledriver on the steel ring steps, after which he covered Van Dam for the pinfall to win the match.

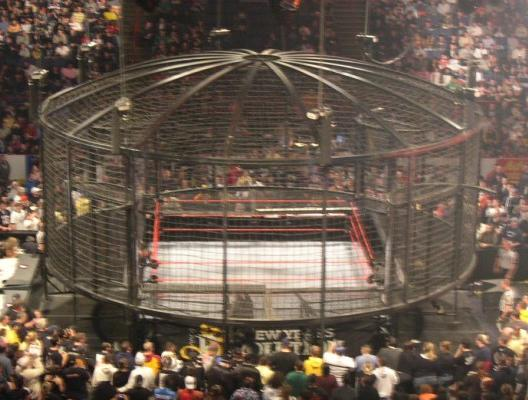
The Elimination Chamber structure

The main event was the Elimination Chamber match for the World Heavyweight Championship, in which Triple H defended the title against Chris Jericho, Goldberg, Kevin Nash, Randy Orton, and Shawn Michaels. The match began with Jericho, and Michaels in the ring, while Goldberg, Nash, Orton, and Triple H were locked in the chambers. Michaels and Jericho wrestled, with neither of them gaining the advantage over the other. Orton and Nash were the third and fourth entrants into the match, respectively. Nash was the first wrestler eliminated from the match after Michaels executed a Sweet Chin Music, and Jericho covered him for a pinfall. Triple H and Goldberg were the fifth and sixth entrants. Michaels performed another Sweet Chin Music on Triple H as soon as he exited his chamber, and as a result, Triple H was knocked back into his chamber. As soon as Goldberg entered the match, he performed a spear for a pinfall to eliminate Orton. Next, Goldberg performed a Jackhammer on both Michaels and Jericho, at one point spearing Jericho through a chamber pod, eliminating both via pinfall. This left Goldberg alone with himself and Triple H who at the time, had remained inside the chamber. Goldberg broke through the glass of his chamber, and in the process, dragged him out of the chamber. Ric Flair, who was managing Triple H, then handed Triple H a sledgehammer. Goldberg attempted another spear on Triple H, who countered the maneuver by hitting Goldberg in the head with the sledgehammer, and covered him for the pinfall, thus retaining the World Heavyweight Championship. After the match, Triple H, Orton and Flair launched a vicious 3-on-1 beatdown on Goldberg, ending with Triple H busting Goldberg open by repeatedly hitting him with his sledgehammer before yelling "this is as close as you will ever get to my title!" whilst holding the World Heavyweight Championship up to Goldberg's face.

== Reception ==
The America West Arena has a maximum capacity of 19,000, but that was reduced for SummerSlam 2003. The event grossed over US$715,000 in ticket sales from an attendance of 16,113, the maximum allowed. This was later confirmed by Linda McMahon, WWE CEO, in a press release on August 26, 2003. The event resulted in 415,000 pay-per-view buys (a 0.88 pay-per-view buyrate). The promotion's pay-per-view revenue was $24.7 million.

Canadian Online Explorer's professional wrestling section rated the entire event a 7 out of 10 stars. The rating was higher than the SummerSlam event in 2004, which was rated a 5 out of 10 stars. The Elimination Chamber main event match from the Raw brand was rated an 9.6 out of 10 stars. The SmackDown! brand's main event, a standard match for the WWE Championship, was rated a 9 out of 10 stars, a lower reception than the Raw brand's main event. Wade Keller reviewed the event for the Pro Wrestling Torch. He rated the Angle-Lesnar match 4-and-a-half out of 5 stars, declaring it an "excellent match". The Elimination Chamber match received a rating of 3 stars. The event was released on DVD on September 23rd, 2003 by Sony Music Entertainment.

== Aftermath ==
During an episode of Raw after SummerSlam, Goldberg challenged Triple H to another match for the World Heavyweight Championship. This match took place at the Unforgiven pay-per-view on September 21, 2003, with a stipulation that, should he lose, Goldberg would retire from WWE. Goldberg defeated Triple H to become the new champion. After SummerSlam, Kurt Angle focused his attention on The Undertaker, whom he wrestled in a match for the WWE Championship during an episode of SmackDown! on September 4, 2003. During the match, Lesnar attacked both wrestlers with a folding chair, leading to an Iron Man match between Angle, and Lesnar. Lesnar won five falls during the match, while Angle won four, and as a result, Lesnar won the title.

The rivalry between Kane, and Rob Van Dam was stopped, as Kane engaged in a feud against Shane McMahon. In a scenario on the August 25, 2003 episode of Raw, Kane attempted to throw McMahon into a dumpster that was set on fire, but McMahon avoided it, and threw Kane into the dumpster. On September 8, 2003, during an episode of Raw, Eric Bischoff scheduled a Last Man Standing match between Kane, and McMahon for Unforgiven. In that match, Kane defeated McMahon after McMahon was unable to respond to a ten count. After SummerSlam, Eddie Guerrero began a rivalry with John Cena over the WWE United States Championship. Guerrero retained the championship in two title defenses that took place on SmackDown!. Guerrero then engaged in a feud with Big Show. At No Mercy, Big Show defeated Guerrero via pinfall to win the WWE United States Championship.

== Results ==
| No. | Results | Stipulations | Times |
|---|---|---|---|
| 1^{H} | Rey Mysterio (c) defeated Shannon Moore | Singles match for the WWE Cruiserweight Championship | 2:03 |
| 2 | La Résistance (René Duprée and Sylvain Grenier) (c) (with Rob Conway) defeated The Dudley Boyz (Bubba Ray and D-Von) (with Spike Dudley) | Tag team match for the World Tag Team Championship | 7:51 |
| 3 | The Undertaker defeated A-Train (with Sable) | Singles match | 9:20 |
| 4 | Shane McMahon defeated Eric Bischoff | Falls Count Anywhere match (Started Originally as a standard one on one match) | 10:36 |
| 5 | Eddie Guerrero (c) defeated Chris Benoit, Rhyno, and Tajiri | Fatal 4-Way match for the WWE United States Championship | 10:50 |
| 6 | Kurt Angle (c) defeated Brock Lesnar by submission | Singles match for the WWE Championship | 20:47 |
| 7 | Kane defeated Rob Van Dam | No Holds Barred match | 12:45 |
| 8 | Triple H (c) (with Ric Flair) defeated Goldberg, Chris Jericho, Shawn Michaels, Randy Orton, and Kevin Nash | Elimination Chamber match for the World Heavyweight Championship | 19:15 |
(c) / – the champion(s) heading into the match; H / – the match was broadcast prior to the pay-per-view on Sunday Night Heat

=== Elimination Chamber entrances and eliminations ===
| Eliminated | Wrestler | Entered | Eliminated by | Method | Time |
|---|---|---|---|---|---|
| 1 | Kevin Nash | 4 | Chris Jericho | Pinfall | 8:05 |
| 2 | Randy Orton | 3 | Goldberg | Pinfall | 13:01 |
| 3 | Shawn Michaels | 1 | Goldberg | Pinfall | 15:21 |
| 4 | Chris Jericho | 2 | Goldberg | Pinfall | 16:05 |
| 5 | Goldberg | 6 | Triple H | Pinfall | 19:15 |
| Winner | Triple H (c) | 5 | | | 19:15 |
