= Arda Ocal =

Canadian television personality

Arda Öcal
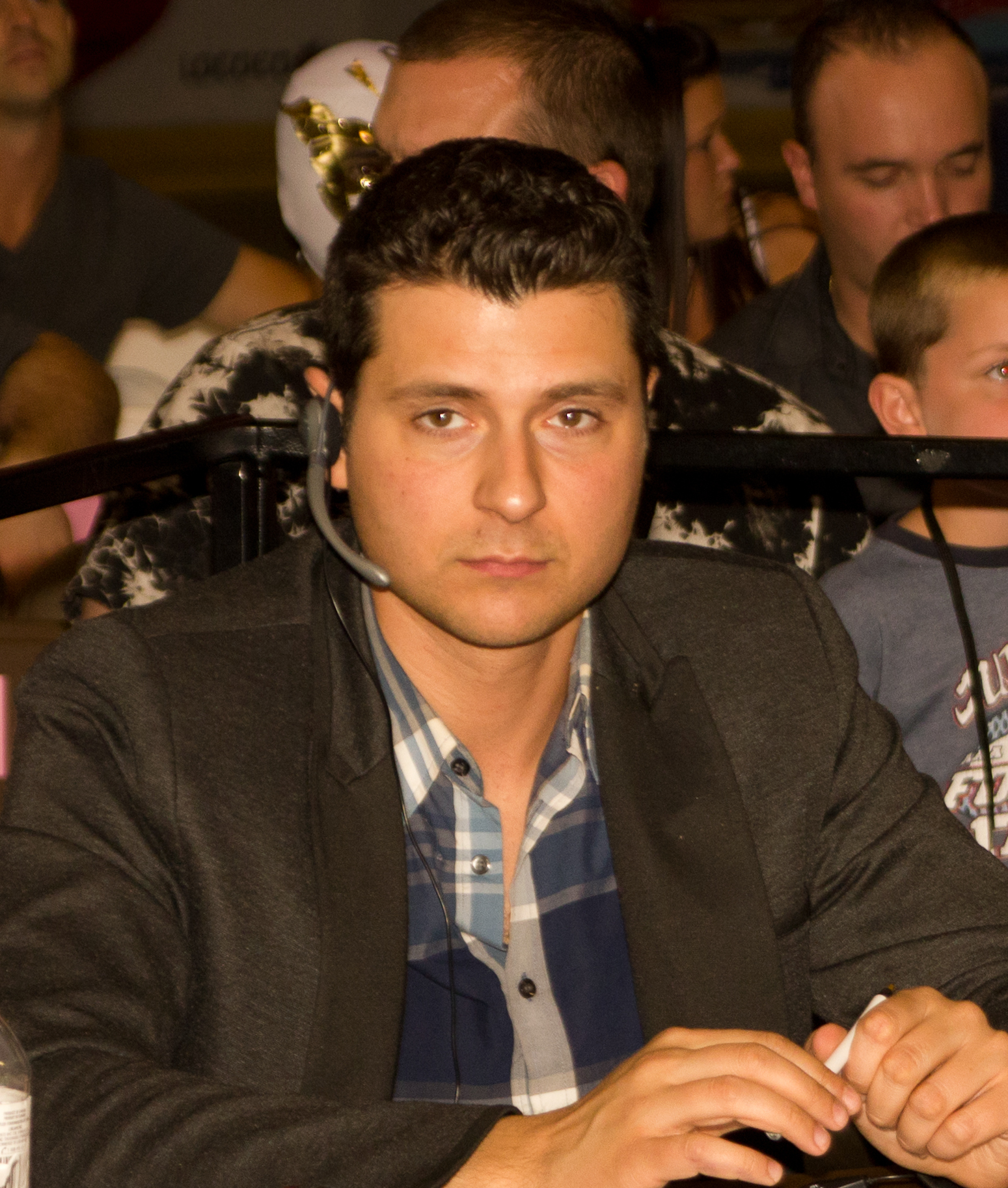
- Öcal ringside doing commentary at an independent wrestling event in June 2012

Personal information
- Born: Arda Öcal; May 7, 1981 (age 45) North York, Toronto, Ontario, Canada
- Education: University of Waterloo
- Spouse: Jennifer Öcal
- Children: 1

Professional wrestling career
- Ring name(s): Arda Ocal; Kyle Edwards
- Debut: 1999

Arda Ocal (Turkish: Arda Öcal; born May 7, 1981) is a Canadian television personality, broadcaster, announcer, and writer. He previously worked in WWE under the stage name Kyle Edwards, as well as the host of Aftermath TV on Sportsnet 360 and The MSG Hockey Show on MSG Network, as well as various current sports coverage on ESPN and TRT World.

His previous roles included being a columnist for The Baltimore Sun publication/blog and as an analyst for Rogers TV and host for YES Network. He was also formerly with The Weather Network as a morning show co-host, The Score Television Network (where he created the show Aftermath as well as hosted WWE Experience and Countdown to WWE Raw), and Global TV as a sports reporter, as well as a co-host of the daily lifestyle program Daytime on the Canadian channel Rogers TV in Mississauga, Ontario, before beginning to host and provide color commentary for their flagship Brampton Battalion OHL hockey broadcasts and serving as host for Toronto Marlies American Hockey League broadcasts on the channel.

== Early life and education ==
Arda Öcal was born in North York, an administrative district of Toronto, Ontario to Turkish parents.

He holds a degree in Mathematics and Business Administration from the University of Waterloo. While there, he spent three years hosting a variety show on CKMS in Waterloo, Ontario, and released Warrior Nation, a compilation disc of the University of Waterloo's best musical talents, which sold over 4000 copies. Arda has always had a passion for the game of hockey, he played all throughout his childhood. He even went on to play in high school and got offers to play in college, but decided to focus on broadcasting.

Öcal formerly served as a member of the board of directors at a well known charity in Brampton as well as the Brampton Symphony Orchestra, and was involved with independent wrestling group Maximum Wrestling, where he was also a ring announcer, play by play commentator and promoter. As promoter, he was the first to bring charity wrestling events to Iqaluit, Nunavut in 2008 (and again in 2011 and 2013). He also previously served as editor-in-chief of Think Impact (a division of Impact, one of Canada's largest entrepreneurial organizations).

== Television career ==
=== Aftermath TV and The Score ===
In 2009, Öcal pitched and hosted Aftermath TV weekly on Sportsnet 360 following the broadcast of WWE Raw on Tuesday afternoons (and previously following the airing of WWE SmackDown on Friday nights, as well as Aftermath Radio after WWE Raw, which he hosted with former WWE referee Jim Korderas. Renee Paquette eventually co-hosted and then hosted Aftermath TV with Arda and former WWE referee Jim Korderas. He was a broadcaster with The Score Fighting Series, a Canadian MMA weekly televised program, as well as serving as cage announcer and backstage interviewer for MMA fights across Canada televised on theScore. Ocal also provided MMA fight picks on the Score's mobile application ScoreMobile. He has interviewed a variety of notable international superstars and aired segments of these interviews on his show. These include Bret Hart, Sheamus, Honky Tonk Man, The Iron Sheik, Drew McIntyre, Chris Jericho, Gail Kim and Sgt. Slaughter, UFC president Dana White, and Bellator CEO Bjorn Rebney.

=== The Weather Network (2013–2014) ===
Öcal was a national morning show co-host and reporter from November 2013 to August 2014, first based in Ottawa, then Vancouver. His approach was "Weathertainment", often infusing humor into his reports. During his tenure he interviewed and filmed comedic features with the likes of Cake Boss Buddy Valastro, Oliver Stone, Ken Dryden, several Toronto Maple Leafs and Detroit Red Wings alumni, Dave Coulier, and Margaret Atwood.

=== Broadcaster ===
Öcal is primarily a broadcaster in sports and lifestyle. On top of OHL hockey, he has provided play by play commentary for IBL baseball, CSL soccer, high school football, numerous junior hockey games and tournaments, and boxing. In 2011, he most famously called a bout with hall of fame boxing broadcaster Al Bernstein, on which one bout between Samuel Vargas and Ahmad Cheiko became a candidate for Canadian Boxing fight of the year.

From 2007 to 2008, Öcal served as male host for the daily talk show daytime on Rogers TV, which aired in the Toronto area. The program followed a similar format to other popular talk shows, starting with host banter (Öcal worked with co-host Kim McCleary), followed by several guests.

In 2012, Öcal was the creator, host, and producer of "Athlete Tweet Watch", a weekly three-minute video series on YES Network.

On April 1, 2013, Öcal announced via his personal Twitter account that he had left the Score Television Network.

Öcal previously worked on broadcasts for the Toronto Marlies AHL hockey team, the affiliate for the Toronto Maple Leafs NHL franchise. He also provides commentary on boxing, soccer and table tennis events.

In November 2016, Öcal began hosting The MSG Hockey Show, with co-hosts Anson Carter and Will Reeve. It is a weekly 30-minute program where "The Xs and Os are thrown out the window" and the show focuses on fun. This show was abruptly cancelled due to low ratings. Ocal also appears on New York Rangers, New Jersey Devils NHL and New York Knicks NBA game broadcasts.

Öcal served as an American sports analyst/pundit on TRT World.

He was the play by play voice of the NHL Gaming World Championships, airing on NBC Sports in the United States, SportsNet in Canada and Viasat in Europe.

On December 31, 2018, Öcal served as host for "Ninja New Years", a 12-hour stream at Times Square in New York City hosted by Fortnite streamer Ninja.

Öcal currently serves as a co-host of Classic Tetris Monthly, a monthly tournament created by Vandweller in which competitors play against each other in a best of five matches of NES Tetris.

=== ESPN ===
In October 2016, Öcal began working with ESPN on their esports coverage at the League of Legends World championship semi-finals and finals, as well as BlizzCon 2016. He hosted video segments and conducted interviews with players, coaches and luminaries.

With the NHL's return to ESPN, Öcal began working for their studio coverage for most games on ESPN+, as well as hosting In the Crease. Ocal also works select nights of SportsCenter either on TV or on Snapchat, as well as SportsNation. He's also contributed to ESPN's NBA, PGA Tour, Euro soccer, MLS, UFC, MLB, and NFL coverage.

In May 2026 Ocal announced on social media that he was let go from ESPN after almost 10 years with the network.

== Professional wrestling career ==
=== Independent circuit (1999–2014) ===
In the independent circuit in Toronto, Öcal was a promoter, ring announcer, commentator, interviewer, and host. He began in high school as the heel for a rival school in NRW, and then in 1999 as a live commentator at local wrestling events at flea markets. In 2006, he worked with the now defunct independent promotion Blood Sweat and Ears based in Toronto, Ontario and became affiliated with Squared Circle Training wrestling school. In January 2008, Ocal promoted the first ever wrestling events in the Canadian Arctic city of Iqaluit, Nunavut. Wrestlers such as Rhyno, Jay Reso, Lance Storm, Bobby Roode, Tracy Brooks, Christy Hemme, Jimmy Jacobs, Colt Cabana, Matt Morgan, and others have wrestled in the Arctic at these charity events held between 2008 and 2013.

In the summer of 2008, Öcal promoted a 16-day cross-Canada summer pro-wrestling tour, which saw shows in Mississauga, North Bay, Kenora, Yorkton, Estevan, Swift Current, Winnipeg, Kapuskasing, Timmins, and Manitoulin Island. The tour raised money for various local charities.

Between 2010 and 2012, Öcal worked for Dragon Gate USA, performed ring announcing duties and commentary with Lenny Leonard or solo. Other broadcast partners included Bryce Remsburg, Colt Cabana, and Johnny Gargano.

In 2012 and 2013, Öcal served as Master of Ceremonies for the George Tragos and Lou Thesz Professional Wrestling Hall of Fame induction banquet in Waterloo, Iowa. Also in 2013 he served as MC for the "Baloney Blowout" event at the annual Cauliflower Alley Club Reunion in Las Vegas, and co-hosted the 2013 New England Pro Wrestling Hall of Fame Ceremony with Howard Finkel.

From 2012 to 2013, Öcal served as ring announcer and commentator for Smash Wrestling based in Toronto.

=== WWE (2014–2016) ===
On September 24, 2014, Öcal was hired by WWE. He worked under the ring name Kyle Edwards and hosted WWE Bottom Line, as well as WWE Experience for the European market. Ocal also provided exclusive 1-on-1 interviews with the UK, Indian, and South American versions of RAW as well as WWE.com. Ocal then went to debut as a host on the WWE Network Raw Pre-Show on April 27, 2015.

In May 2015, Öcal began hosting a weekly segment on the WWE Network and on social media entitled "This Week in WWE History" with Corey Graves. In October 2015, he took over from Tom Phillips as host of the 5 Things series on WWE's YouTube channel. On April 29, 2016, Öcal confirmed on Twitter that he had parted ways with WWE.

== Volunteer work and charity ==
He has sat on the board of directors for the Brampton Symphony Orchestra, as well as tutored and worked with the Brampton Neighbourhood Resource Centre. He has also done extensive volunteer work with the March of Dimes and has canvassed for the Kidney Foundation. From January 2008 to May 2014, Ocal organized, promoted and served as ring announcer for non-profit trips to Iqaluit, Nunavut in the Canadian Arctic. He spoke to children in elementary, middle and high schools, youth centres as well as juvenile detention centres.

== Personal life ==
Öcal is a Muslim. He is married to Jennifer and they have a daughter, Ayla.
