= Renee Paquette =

Canadian television personality

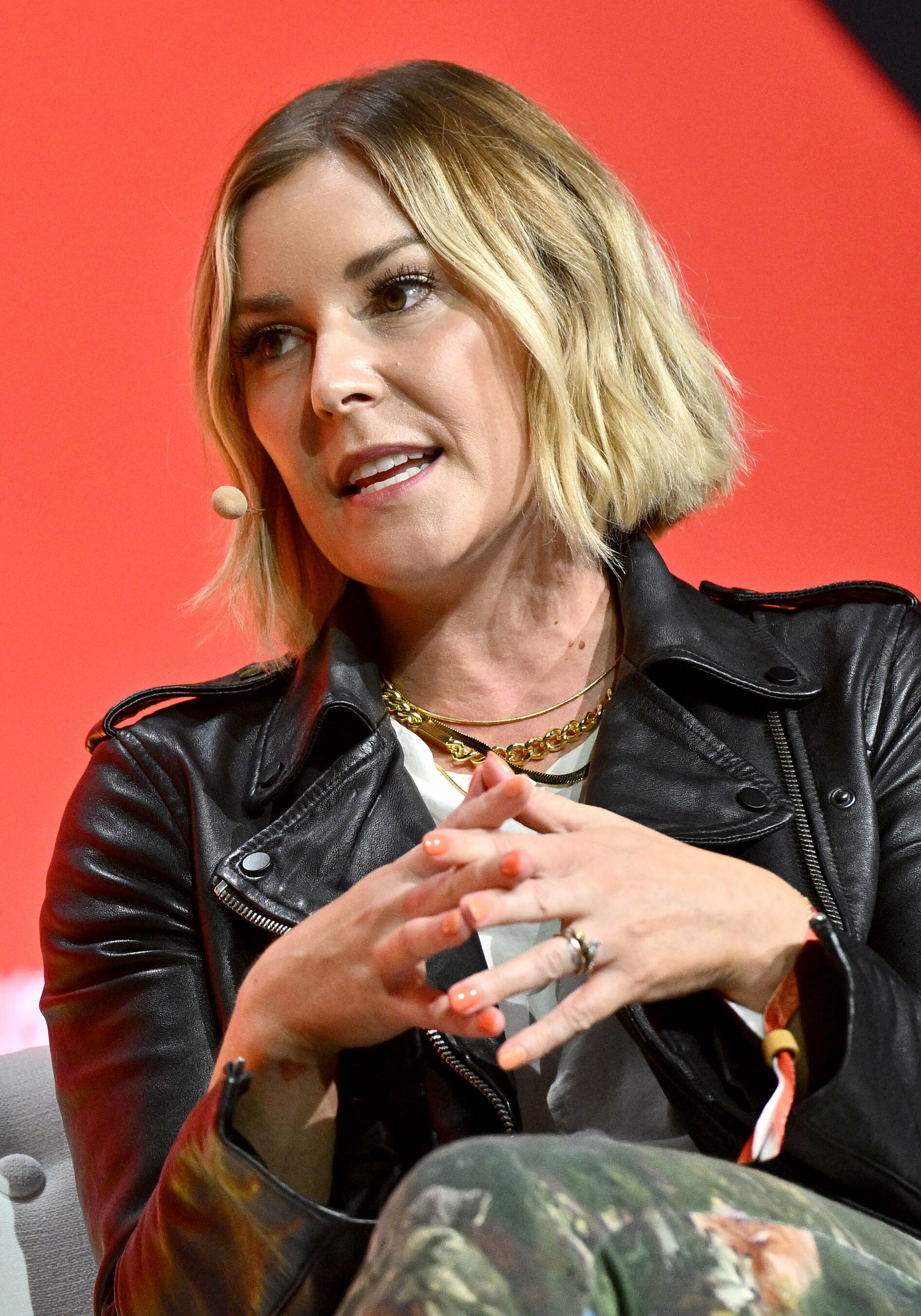
- Paquette in 2023
- Born: Renee Jane Paquette; Toronto, Ontario, Canada
- Citizenship: Canada; United States
- Occupations: Sports broadcaster; commentator; television personality
- Years active: 2009–present
- Spouse: Jonathan Good (m. 2017)
- Children: 1
- Professional wrestling career
- Ring name(s): Renee Paquette; Renee Young
- Billed height: 5 ft 5 in (165 cm)
- Debut: November 18, 2012

YouTube information
- Channel: Renee Paquette
- Years active: 2021–present
- Genre: Podcasting
- Subscribers: 172,000
- Views: 26.6 million
- Last updated: June 28, 2025

Renee Jane Paquette is a Canadian and American television personality. She is signed to All Elite Wrestling (AEW) as a backstage interviewer and pre-show panelist. She was previously known for her time in WWE between 2012 and 2020, where she served as a commentator, presenter, and interviewer under the ring name Renee Young. During her time in WWE, Young also appeared as a main cast member on the reality TV series Total Divas. Before signing with WWE, she was a sports broadcaster for The Score Television Network.

== Early life ==
Renee Jane Paquette was born in Toronto, Ontario, Canada. After high school, she applied to several colleges and began training in improv comedy. At the age of 19, she relocated to Los Angeles to pursue a career as a comedic actress, but later moved back to Toronto and auditioned for films, music videos, and commercials there instead. After becoming frustrated with her lack of auditions, she became interested in broadcasting instead of acting.

== Career ==
=== The Score Television Network (2009–2012) ===
Paquette began working for The Score Television Network in 2009 on a program called Right After Wrestling, later renamed Aftermath, where she presented alongside broadcasters Arda Ocal and Mauro Ranallo as well as former WWE referee Jimmy Korderas.

=== WWE (2012–2021) ===
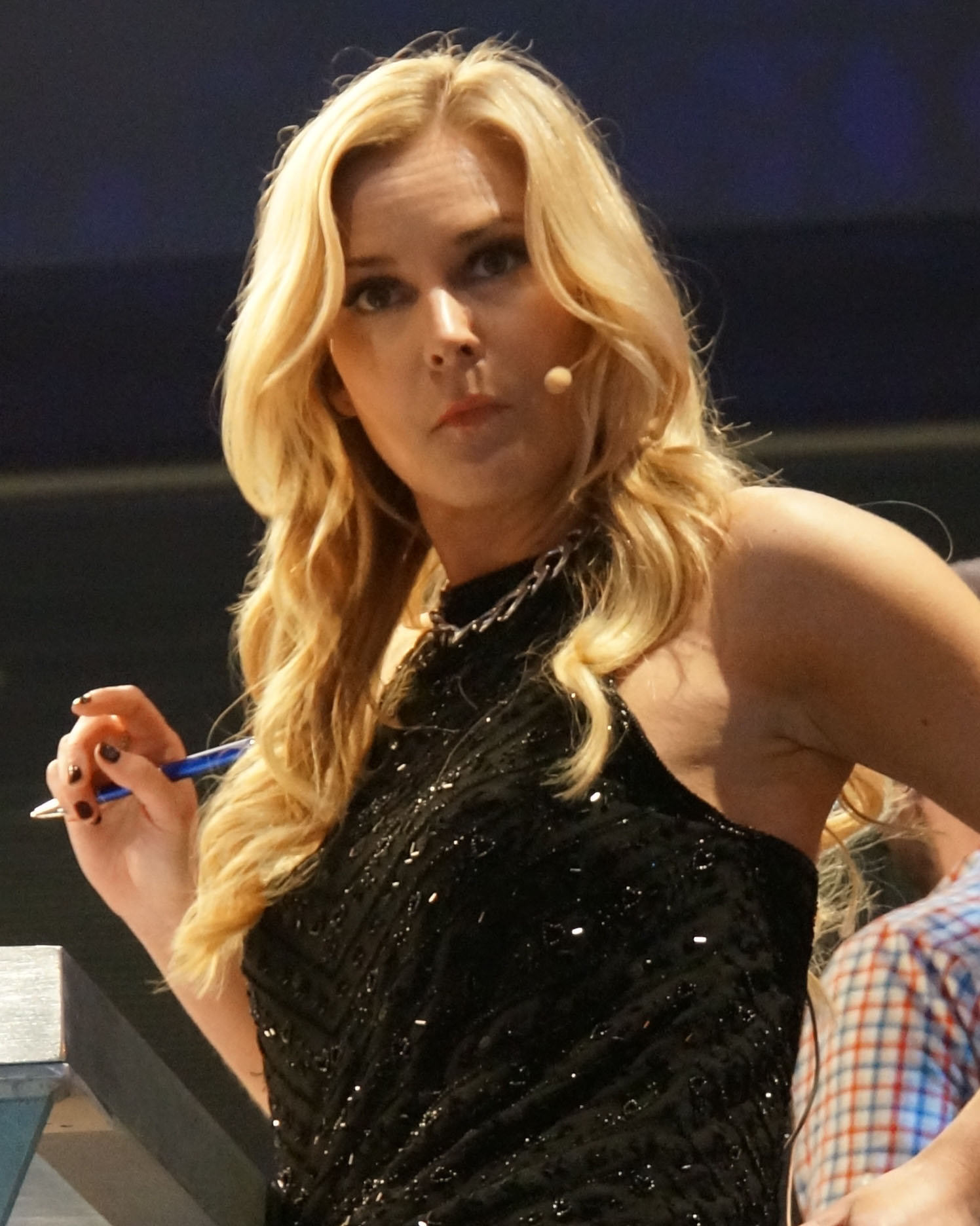
Paquette in 2014

Paquette signed with the American professional wrestling promotion WWE in October 2012, where she was initially given the ring name Renee Sterling before choosing the name Renee Young (a nod to Neil Young). Her first appearance was as a co-host on the 2012 Survivor Series pre-show alongside Scott Stanford. Young then debuted on the January 23, 2013, episode of NXT as a backstage interviewer. She began performing interviews exclusively for WWE Active in February 2013. Renee made her SmackDown debut on the March 29 episode, interviewing Randy Orton, Big Show, and Sheamus.

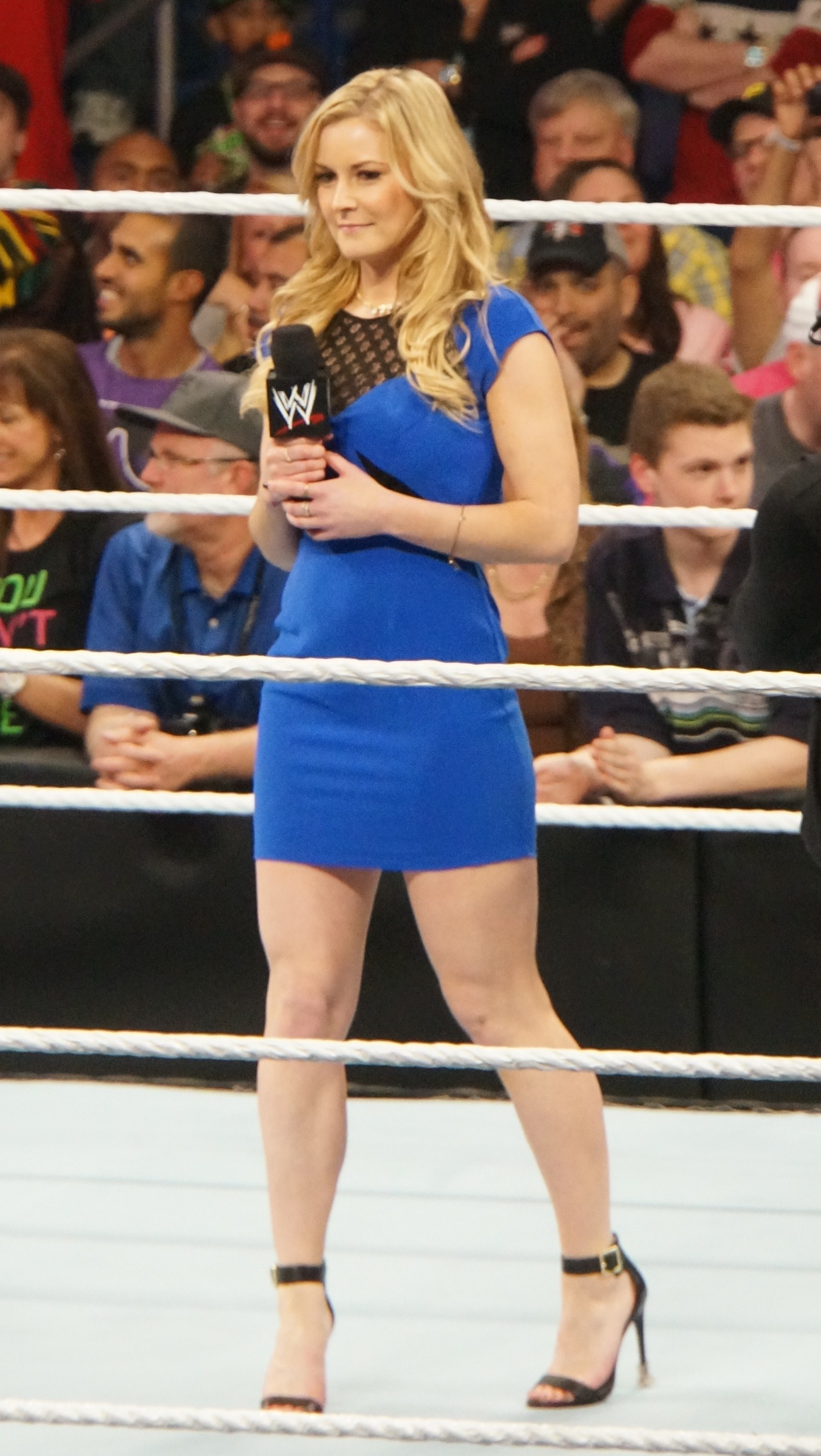
Renee Young in April 2014

Young began co-hosting the World Tour segments, which was a segment detailing the city they were filming in, showcasing various tourist attractions, before later being promoted as a third main presenter on the JBL and Cole Show, which was shown on YouTube and WWE's website, until its cancellation in June 2015. It received a Slammy Award for Favorite Web Show of the Year. She also presented WWE Vintage Collection alongside Gene Okerlund.

In September 2013, Young made her commentary debut on NXT. She began performing color commentary during women's matches, before later becoming a full-time color commentator on NXT for several months. From July 3, 2014, to January 9, 2015, Young served as a color commentator on Superstars, alongside Tom Phillips, which made her WWE's first full-time female announcer in more than a decade. In April 2015, Young began hosting her own WWE Network show, Unfiltered with Renee Young, in which she interviews fellow WWE employees. In June, Young served as the co-host of the sixth season of Tough Enough, alongside Chris Jericho.

On the December 20, 2016, episode of SmackDown, Young interviewed WWE Intercontinental Champion The Miz following his successful title defense against Apollo Crews. After Young asked Miz about his "obsession" with Dean Ambrose, Miz sarcastically responded by revealing Young and Ambrose's real-life relationship, prompting her to slap Miz. On December 27, Young was confronted by The Miz's real-life wife, Maryse, backstage on SmackDown. Maryse slapped Young the following week in retaliation, for which she was fined.

Young filled in for Jonathan Coachman as a guest commentator on the August 13, 2018, episode of Raw, making her the first woman to call an entire episode of Raw. Young joined the Raw commentary team full-time the following month and became the first permanent female commentator on the program. Beginning in October 2019, Young moved to SmackDown as a "special contributor" and began co-hosting the new studio program WWE Backstage on Fox Sports 1 with Booker T. On November 1, 2019, Young filled in as commentator on SmackDown, as Michael Cole and Corey Graves missed the episode due to travel delays returning from Crown Jewel. Young announced her departure from WWE at SummerSlam in August 2020, stating that the event would be her last appearance with the company. Young explained that she left WWE because of the cancelation of WWE Backstage and that she felt that she had accomplished everything in WWE. Youn returned for a special SmackDown pre-show on Friday, October 16, 2020, co-hosting the kickoff show alongside Booker T as a part of the celebration of season two of SmackDown on Fox. Paquette made a special appearance on the return of WWE Backstage for the January 30, 2021 episode, promoting the upcoming Royal Rumble, with her returning co-hosts Paige, and Booker T.

=== All Elite Wrestling (2022–present) ===
On October 12, 2022, Tony Khan confirmed via his social media account that Paquette had signed with All Elite Wrestling (AEW). She made her debut the same night on Dynamite.

== Other media ==
Before joining The Score, Paquette worked for BiteTV, where she presented a show about extreme sports and music called Rippin' It-N-Lippin' It during 2008 and 2009. She appeared in a commercial for Oxy and had a part in a Tom Green music video. Prior to this, she had a cameo in the music video for Kelly Clarkson's 2005 song "Behind These Hazel Eyes". She also appeared in a national Noxzema commercial and did a photoshoot for Toro Magazine. In 2016, Paquette began appearing as a main cast member for the sixth season of Total Divas. She had previously appeared in several episodes on a recurring basis. She also hosted the podcast Regular Girls with Stacy McGunnigle.

In 2021, Paquette began her own podcast Oral Sessions with Renee Paquette (later renamed The Sessions with Renee Paquette). In addition to the podcast, she created her own YouTube channel to accompany the audio episodes in the form of video clips, and full podcast episodes, under the channel name of Renee Paquette. In September 2021, she also began hosting a show on SiriusXM with former Strikeforce and UFC Women's Bantamweight Champion Miesha Tate called Throwing Down with Renee and Miesha.

== Personal life ==
Paquette began dating American professional wrestler Jonathan Good (better known by ring names Jon Moxley and formerly, Dean Ambrose) in 2013. They were married at their Las Vegas home in an impromptu ceremony in April 9, 2017. In November 2020, Paquette and Good announced that they were expecting their first child. Their daughter, Nora Murphy Good, was born on June 15, 2021.

Paquette is a fan of the Vegas Golden Knights ice hockey team. On being a wrestling fan in both her childhood and adulthood, she said, "I attended a few events and WrestleMania VI. My father is a concert promoter and he used to get me into events. I recall being backstage and meeting Stone Cold Steve Austin, Triple H, Chyna, & Trish Stratus as a kid, so it's really funny to me that I ended up here. I went down a distinct path than wanting to be a WWE Superstar."

In March 2021, Renee reported that she became an American citizen. In May, she posted her cookbook Messy in the Kitchen: My Guide to Eating Deliciously, Hosting Fabulously and Sipping Copiously.

== Filmography ==
=== Film ===
Year	Title	Role	Notes
2020	The Main Event	Herself	

=== Television ===
Year	Title	Role	Notes
2007	The Smart Woman Survival Guide	Cute Intern	Episode: "Go Big or Go Home"
2010	Gotta Grudge?	Herself	8 episodes
2011–2012	Gillette Drafted	Herself	Judge, mentor
2013	WWE: The Top 25 Rivalries in Wrestling History	Herself	Host
2014	WWE Countdown	Herself	Episode: "Coolest Catchphrases"
2014–2020	WWE Music Power 10	Herself	Voice-over host
2014–2020	WWE Quick Hits	Herself	Host
2015–2019	Total Divas	Herself	Recurring (seasons 4 & 5); Main cast (season 6); Guest (seasons 7, 8 & 9): 38 episodes
2015–2017	Unfiltered with Renee Young	Herself	Host
2015	WWE Tough Enough	Herself	Co-host
2016-2018	Ride Along	Herself	2 episodes
2016–2018	WWE Talking Smack	Herself	Host
2016–2018	WWE Raw Talk	Herself	Host
2017–2018	Total Bellas	Herself	4 episodes
2018	Miz & Mrs.	Herself	Episodes: "A Simple Mizunderstanding" & "Proud Papa"
2019–2020	WWE Backstage	Herself	Co-host
2022	Hey! (EW)	Herself	1 episode
2025	Grounded in Love		TV Movie

=== Web ===
Year	Title	Role
2013–2015	The JBL and Renee Show	Herself
2013–2015	After Total Divas	Herself

== Awards and accomplishments ==
- WWE
  - Slammy Award for Favorite Web Show of the Year (2013) – with Michael Cole and John "Bradshaw" Layfield for The JBL and Cole Show

== Bibliography ==
- Paquette, Renee (2021). Messy in the Kitchen: My Guide to Eating Deliciously, Hosting Fabulously and Sipping Copiously. Permuted Press. ISBN 978-1-64293-930-9.
