= Scott Stanford =

American sports announcer (born 1966)

Personal information
- Born: August 30, 1966 (age 59) Haverstraw, New York, U.S.

Professional wrestling career
- Ring name: Scott Stanford
- Debut: 2009

Scott Stanford (born August 30, 1966) is an American entertainment host, news/sports anchor and commentator. Stanford can be seen co-hosting The Suki & Scott Show on digital and broadcast platforms. Since Sept of 2023, Scott can also be heard anchoring morning newscasts on 1010WINS/92.3FM in NYC. Scott was also anchoring sports at CBS Sports HQ. Scott was recently the main sports anchor on PIX11 NY as well as co-host along with Sukanya Krishnan on the WPIX11 Morning Show. Along with Tamsen Fadal, he was co-anchor of WPIX-TV in New York City's weeknight 5 pm and 10 pm newscasts until July 2014. Stanford previously worked for WWE for 15 years as a host for This Week in WWE, Bottom Line and Afterburn on the WWE Network. Scott can also be heard occasionally hosting on 77 WABC Radio in New York and doing stand up comedy for various charity organizations.

== Journalism career ==
=== Sports anchor (2002-2008, 2009-2013, 2014–present) ===
At WCBS Newsradio 880, Stanford received the 2002 and 2003 "AIR Award," which recognized him as the best radio sports anchor in the New York City market. Stanford is also six-time New York Emmy Award-winning sportscaster for "On-Camera Achievement." He also started working for WNYW-TV, where he was the post-game reporter for the New York Yankees baseball team, along with hosting/reporting duties for the New York Giants Football pre-game kickoff shows. Scott's "Know Your Foe" Giants quiz segment has also received an award from the Associated Press. He also acts as a play-by-play announcer for college basketball and arena football. Stanford left WNBC-TV to start as weekday 5PM and 10PM anchor on WPIX-TV, but was later given a reassigned role in July 2014, becoming WPIX's lead sports anchor. He was also the host of the PIX11 Sports Desk, a nightly sports wrap up show on PIX11 at 10:45. Stanford was also the main host for NY Yankees Pre Game shows when the Yankees air on PIX11. Stanford left WPIX in January 2019.

== Professional wrestling career ==
Stanford debuted in WWE in 2009 replacing Jack Korpela as the host of WWE Bottom Line. In October 2010, he became the new play-by-play commentator for WWE Superstars replacing Michael Cole. He called his first episode on the October 7 episode of Superstars with Jerry Lawler. This team was short-lived, however, as in mid-November injured wrestler CM Punk, who had started commentating on Raw, replaced Lawler on Superstars. At the end of December, Punk left the commentary team after assaulting John Cena on Raw and SmackDown with a chair. Starting on the December 31 episode of Superstars, Josh Mathews joined Stanford as the color commentator. In addition to his commentary duties, with Tony Dawson, he hosted the pre-recorded PPV Preshow every month. Stanford also made appearances in Zack Ryder's weekly Z! True Long Island Story YouTube series. On the show, Stanford revealed that he was the man who attacked Chiappetta, Ryder's best friend, becoming a heel in the process. This was later proven false as it was Stanford's exact look-alike, Rot (wearing a "#Heel" Jacket), who performed the ambush. Stanford was the host of the Monday Night Raw and SmackDown Live pre-shows on the WWE Network until November 2016 as well as the host of This Week in WWE. Stanford announced he had left WWE in July 2025 ending his 15-year tenure with the company.
