= WWE Main Event =

Professional wrestling streaming television program

- Logo used since October 14, 2026
- Created by: Vince McMahon
- Presented by: Blake Howard (play-by-play commentator); Vic Joseph (color commentator)
- Starring: Raw roster (2012–present) NXT roster (2022–present) SmackDown roster (2012–2016, 2025–present)
- Opening theme: "I Can't Lose" by def rebel feat. Justin Starling
- Country of origin: United States
- No. of seasons: 15
- No. of episodes: 798

Production
- Executive producers: Paul "Triple H" Levesque; Lee Fitting
- Producer: Bruce Prichard
- Camera setup: Multi-camera setup
- Running time: 55 minutes (2012-2025); 30 minutes (2026-present)
- Production company: World Wrestling Entertainment, LLC

Original release
- Network: Ion Television
- Release: October 3, 2012 – 2014
- Network: Hulu
- Release: 2012 – 2024
- Network: WWE.com
- Release: 2013 – 2014
- Network: WWE Network (Note: While the WWE Network once aired new first-run episodes of the program, Peacock's WWE Network channel only aired replays of new episodes with a delay.)
- Release: 2014 – 2024
- Network: Peacock
- Release: January 7, 2021 – December 25, 2025
- Network: YouTube
- Release: January 8 – October 8, 2026
- Network: Rumble
- Release: October 14, 2026 – present

Related
- WWE Evolve; WWE Raw; WWE SmackDown; WWE NXT

WWE Main Event, or simply Main Event, is an American professional wrestling streaming television program produced by WWE. Premiering on October 3, 2012, the hour-long program features mid-to-low-card wrestlers from WWE's main roster, while also occasionally featuring wrestlers from the NXT developmental brand. As of October 14, 2026, Main Event streams on Rumble in the United States.

Main Event is currently taped prior to WWE Raw and WWE SmackDown. Episodes generally feature two matches (typically one men's match and one women's match). The program was initially carried by Ion Television until April 2014. It is also carried by WWE's international television partners.

== History ==
Second logo, used from August 19, 2014 to October 8, 2026.

The series first aired in the United States on Ion Television, originally premiering October 3, 2012 and airing on Wednesday nights. WWE considered the show to be a spiritual replacement for WWE Superstars (which previously aired on WGN America until 2011, and transitioned to WWE's digital platforms in the United States afterward). Hulu acquired rights to the series as well, as part of a larger pact that included video on-demand rights for WWE's main weekly programs.

Ion Television dropped the series in April 2014; following the cancellation, WWE streamed a live episode of Main Event from Detroit on its then-new subscription service WWE Network. It was reported to be a stress test for live events on the service in preparation for WrestleMania XXX.

Prior to November 28, 2016, Main Event was taped prior to SmackDown. Its tapings were then moved to Raw after the premiere of WWE Network's 205 Live, which was broadcast live after SmackDown from the same venue. Main Event was initially positioned as a non-branded show, featuring performers from both the Raw and SmackDown rosters. Following the 2016 WWE Draft, the program became exclusive to SmackDown. After the cancellation of Superstars, Main Event became exclusive to Raw.

In late-2022, under changes made by Triple H after being promoted to WWE's chief content officer, NXT wrestlers began to increasingly appear on Main Event to evaluate their performance and audience reception when performing with members of the main roster. At the beginning of 2026, Main Event started airing on YouTube in the United States; and on January 15, Main Event changed its format, showing two to three exclusive matches in a 30 minute runtime, removing the usual Raw and SmackDown highlights. On September 24, WWE announced that they had signed an exclusive deal with Rumble to stream Main Event on the platform beginning October 14.

== Episodes ==
| Season | Episodes | First aired | Last aired |
|---|---|---|---|
| 1 | 13 | October 3, 2012 | December 26, 2012 |
| 2 | 52 | January 2, 2013 | December 25, 2013 |
| 3 | 53 | January 1, 2014 | December 30, 2014 |
| 4 | 52 | January 6, 2015 | December 30, 2015 |
| 5 | 52 | January 6, 2016 | December 29, 2016 |
| 6 | 52 | January 5, 2017 | December 28, 2017 |
| 7 | 52 | January 4, 2018 | December 27, 2018 |
| 8 | 52 | January 3, 2019 | December 26, 2019 |
| 9 | 53 | January 2, 2020 | December 31, 2020 |
| 10 | 52 | January 7, 2021 | December 30, 2021 |
| 11 | 52 | January 6, 2022 | December 29, 2022 |
| 12 | 52 | January 5, 2023 | December 28, 2023 |
| 13 | 53 | January 4, 2024 | December 26, 2024 |
| 14 | 52 | January 2, 2025 | December 25, 2025 |
| 15 | 18 | January 1, 2026 | present |

== See also ==
- WCW Main Event
- WWE Velocity
- WWE Evolve
- WWE Heat
