= WWE Velocity =

Professional wrestling television program

- Genre: Sports entertainment Professional wrestling
- Created by: Vince McMahon
- Country of origin: United States
- No. of seasons: 4
- No. of episodes: 204

Production
- Running time: 46 minutes

Original release
- Network: TNN/Spike TV
- Release: May 25, 2002 – September 24, 2005
- Network: WWE.com (streaming)
- Release: October 1, 2005 – June 11, 2006

Related
- WWF Jakked/Metal (1999–2002); WWE Heat (1998–2008); WWE Superstars (2009–2016); WWE Main Event (2012–)

WWE Velocity, or simply Velocity, is an American professional wrestling television program that was produced by World Wrestling Entertainment (WWE) and was broadcast weekly from May 25, 2002 to June 11, 2006. It aired domestically Saturday nights on TNN/Spike TV until moving to streaming on WWE.com in 2005. Velocity served as a supplementary show to the SmackDown! brand, focusing more exclusively on its mid-card performers and matches, and was recorded before the week's television taping of SmackDown!.

== History ==
WWE Velocity replaced two syndicated WWE shows, Jakked and Metal. WWE Velocity was primarily used to summarize major occurrences on the latest episode of SmackDown!, which aired Thursday and later Friday nights on UPN. Due to the WWE Brand Extension, Velocity aired matches and content from the SmackDown brand. The format was set to mirror that of WWE Heat and its relation to the Raw brand.

Velocity aired as a weekly Saturday night show on TNN (renamed to Spike TV in 2003) between 10-11pm EST. The show also broadcast internationally. In the United Kingdom it aired on Sky Sports 2 on Sunday mornings.

Following Raw's move from Spike TV back to the USA Network in 2005, Velocity and its Raw brand counterpart, Heat, were discontinued from television broadcast in the United States and Canada and became webcasts streamed on WWE.com. The newest episode would be uploaded to WWE.com on Saturdays and be available for the next week. Older webcast episodes were also archived. Internationally, Velocity and Heat continued to be broadcast on their respective television networks due to WWE's international programming commitments.

With the relaunch of ECW, Velocity was cancelled. The last episode of Velocity aired internationally on June 11, 2006. It was also the last episode to be streamed on WWE.com.

== See also ==
- WWE Main Event
- WWE Heat
