= List of WWE broadcasters =

This article lists broadcasting and streaming media platforms airing WWE weekly television programs, Premium Live Events and TV specials.

== United States ==
Country	Name	Day	Channel/Platform
United States (Contiguous); Alaska; Hawaii; Puerto Rico	Premium Live Events	Dates vary (Live)	ESPN (Main Roster PLE's and NXT PLE simulcasts); The CW (NXT PLE's)
United States (Contiguous); Alaska; Hawaii; Puerto Rico	Raw	Mondays (Live)	Netflix
United States (Contiguous); Alaska; Hawaii; Puerto Rico	SmackDown	Fridays (Live)	USA Network
United States (Contiguous); Alaska; Hawaii; Puerto Rico	NXT	Tuesdays (Live)	The CW; ESPN
United States (Contiguous); Alaska; Hawaii; Puerto Rico	Saturday Night's Main Event	Quarterly Saturdays (Live)	Peacock
United States (Contiguous); Alaska; Hawaii; Puerto Rico	Lucha Libre AAA	Saturdays (Live)	YouTube + Facebook
United States (Contiguous); Alaska; Hawaii; Puerto Rico	Main Event	Thursdays	Rumble
United States (Contiguous); Alaska; Hawaii; Puerto Rico	Evolve	Wednesdays	Tubi

== World ==
Country	Name	Day	Channel/Platform
Argentina; Australia; Bangladesh; Belgium; Bhutan; Brazil; Bolivia; Bulgaria; Cambodia; Canada; Caribbean; Chile; Colombia; Czech Republic; Denmark; Dominican Republic; Ecuador; Egypt; Finland; France; Greece; Hong Kong; Hungary; India; Indonesia; Ireland; Israel; Italy; Japan; Kuwait; Malaysia; Mexico; Nepal; Netherlands; New Zealand; Norway; Peru; Philippines; Poland; Portugal; Romania; Saudi Arabia; Singapore; Slovakia; South Korea; Spain; Sri Lanka; Sweden; Taiwan; Thailand; Turkey; Ukraine; United Kingdom	WWE Premium Live Events (e.g., WrestleMania, SummerSlam, Royal Rumble and Survivor Series)	Dates vary (Live)	Netflix
	Raw	Mondays (Live); Tuesdays (Live) outside the Americas	Netflix
	SmackDown	Fridays (Live); Saturdays (Live) outside the Americas	Netflix
	TV Specials featuring main roster superstars (e.g., Saturday Night's Main Event and Worlds Collide)	Dates vary (Live)	YouTube
	Main Event	Wednesdays; Thursdays outside the Americas	Rumble
	NXT Premium Live Events (e.g., Stand & Deliver, Halloween Havoc and DEADL1NE	Dates vary (Live)	Netflix
	NXT	Tuesdays (Live); Wednesdays (Live) outside the Americas	Netflix
	Lucha Libre AAA Major Events (e.g., Triplemanía and Rey de Reyes	Dates vary (Live)	FOX (Latin America region); YouTube + Facebook (everywhere else)
	Lucha Libre AAA	Saturdays (Live); Sundays (Live) outside the Americas	FOX (Latin America region); YouTube + Facebook (everywhere else)
	Evolve	Thursdays	YouTube
Austria; Germany; Switzerland	Premium Live Events	Dates vary (Live)	Netflix
Austria; Germany; Switzerland	Raw	Wednesdays	ProSieben Maxx/Bild
Austria; Germany; Switzerland	NXT	Thursdays	ProSieben Maxx/Bild
Austria; Germany; Switzerland	SmackDown	Saturdays	ProSieben Maxx/Bild
China	Premium Live Events	Dates vary (Live)	iQIYI
China	Raw	Tuesdays (Live)	iQIYI
China	NXT	Wednesdays (Live)	iQIYI
China	SmackDown	Saturdays (Live)	iQIYI
South Africa; Sub-Saharan Africa	Premium Live Events	Dates vary (Live)	SuperSport
South Africa; Sub-Saharan Africa	Raw	Tuesdays (Live)	SuperSport
South Africa; Sub-Saharan Africa	NXT	Wednesdays (Live)	SuperSport
South Africa; Sub-Saharan Africa	SmackDown	Saturdays (Live)	SuperSport

== See also ==
- List of professional wrestling television series
- List of Total Nonstop Action Wrestling programming
