= WWE Bad Blood (2004) =

World Wrestling Entertainment pay-per-view event

Bad Blood
- Promotional poster featuring Edge
- Promotion: World Wrestling Entertainment
- Brand: Raw
- Date: June 13, 2004
- City: Columbus, Ohio
- Venue: Nationwide Arena
- Attendance: 9,000
- Buy rate: 264,000
- Tagline: He's Back. Watch Yours.

Pay-per-view chronology
← Previous; Judgment Day	Next → The Great American Bash

Bad Blood chronology
← Previous; 2003	Next → 2024

The 2004 Bad Blood was a professional wrestling pay-per-view (PPV) event produced by World Wrestling Entertainment (WWE). It was the third Bad Blood and took place on June 13, 2004, at the Nationwide Arena in Columbus, Ohio, held exclusively for wrestlers from the promotion's Raw brand division.

The main event was a Hell in a Cell match, in which Triple H defeated Shawn Michaels. Two bouts were featured on the undercard. In respective singles matches, Chris Benoit defeated Kane to retain the World Heavyweight Championship while Randy Orton defeated Shelton Benjamin to retain the WWE Intercontinental Championship.

The event marked the third time the Hell in a Cell format was used by WWE at a Bad Blood event; the first was at Badd Blood: In Your House in 1997 and the second was at the previous year's event. Bad Blood grossed over $494,000 ticket sales from an attendance of 9,000 and received 264,000 pay-per-view buys, and was instrumental in helping WWE increase its pay-per-view revenue by $4.7 million compared to WWE's previous year. When the event was released on DVD, it peaked at number 3 on Billboard's DVD Sales Chart.

The Bad Blood event would go on a 20-year hiatus, as the following year, it was doubly replaced by One Night Stand and Vengeance, as both were held in June 2005, with the next Bad Blood occurring as a one-off event in 2024. This made it the final Bad Blood to broadcast exclusively via traditional PPV outlets due to WWE transitioning to simulcasting events via livestreaming platforms in February 2014. This was also the final Bad Blood to feature the previous versions of the World Tag Team Championship, WWE Women's Championship, and World Heavyweight Championship, which were retired in August 2010, September 2010, and December 2013, respectively.

== Production ==
=== Background ===
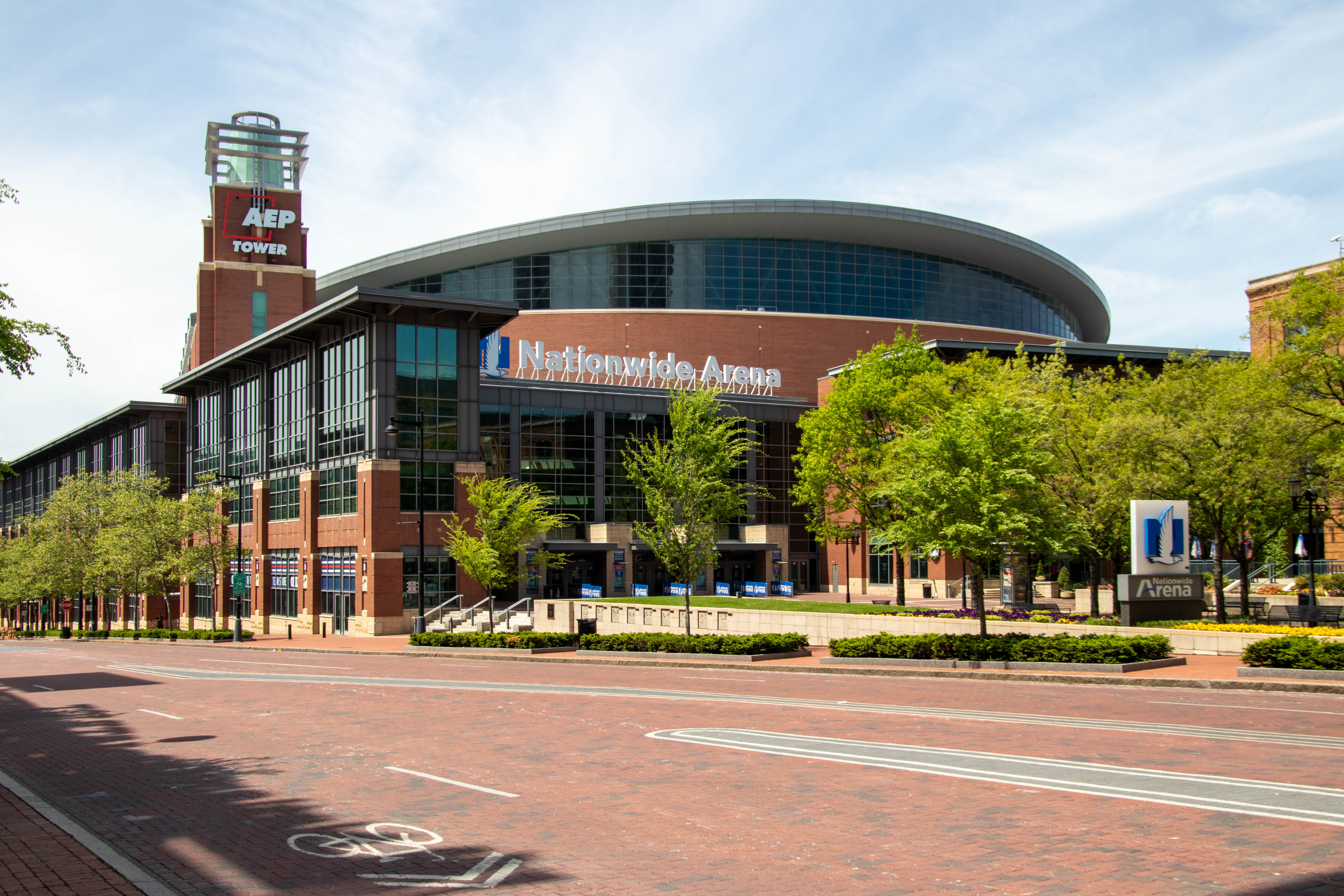
The event was held at the Nationwide Arena in Columbus, Ohio.

Bad Blood was a professional wrestling pay-per-view (PPV) event first held by World Wrestling Entertainment (WWE) as the 18th In Your House PPV event in October 1997. The In Your House series was discontinued after February 1999 as the company moved to install permanent names for each of its monthly PPVs. After six years, WWE reinstated Bad Blood as its own PPV event to be held in June 2003 and it was made exclusive to wrestlers of the Raw brand. A third event was scheduled for June 13, 2004, at the Nationwide Arena in Columbus, Ohio, and was also held exclusively for Raw.

=== Storylines ===
Seven professional wrestling matches were scheduled on the event's card beforehand, which were planned with predetermined outcomes by WWE's script writers. The buildup to these matches and scenarios that took place before, during, and after the event were also planned by the script writers and were played out on WWE's weekly television program, Monday Night Raw. The event featured wrestlers and other talent from Raw's brand – a storyline expansion in which WWE assigned its employees.

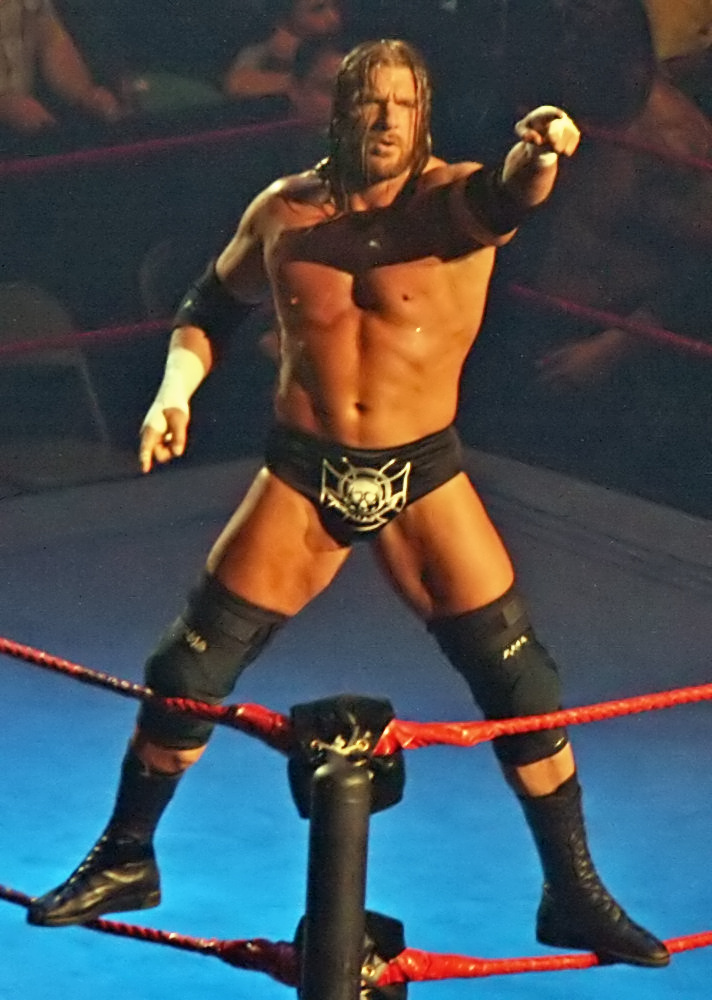
Triple H faced Shawn Michaels in a Hell in a Cell match

The main event scripted into Bad Blood was fought in a Hell in a Cell match between Triple H and Shawn Michaels. The buildup to the match began after Backlash where the main event was a rematch of the main event of WrestleMania XX where Michaels and Triple H took on Chris Benoit in a triple threat match for the World Heavyweight Championship, which saw Benoit retain by forcing Michaels to submit. On the May 3 episode of Raw, Raw General Manager Eric Bischoff booked a match between Benoit and Michaels for the World Heavyweight Championship. The match saw Benoit successfully retain the title after interference by Triple H. On the May 10 episode of Raw, a singles match between Triple H and Shelton Benjamin resulted in a no contest after Michaels attacked Triple H; this resulted in a storyline suspension of Michaels from WWE by Bischoff. On the May 17 episode of Raw, a number one contender's battle royal was contested, with the winner facing Benoit for the World Heavyweight Championship at Bad Blood. During the match, Michaels interfered and eliminated Triple H. On the May 24 episode of Raw, Bischoff scheduled Michaels and Triple H in a Hell in a Cell match at Bad Blood.

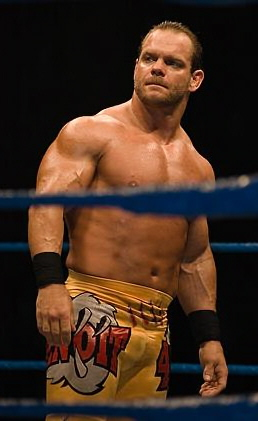
Chris Benoit, who entered Bad Blood as World Heavyweight Champion

One of the featured matches was contested for the World Heavyweight Championship pitting Chris Benoit against Kane, who won the aforementioned battle royal on the May 17 episode of Raw. On the May 24 episode of Raw, Kane cut a promo, in which he revealed that he envied Benoit for having the World Heavyweight Championship and concluded that he would win the championship. On the May 31 episode of Raw, Kane was scheduled in a match against Eugene. The match ended in a disqualification, after Kane hit Eugene with a folding chair. After the match ended, Kane chokeslammed Eugene and began to assault him. Benoit, however, came down to the ring to Eugene's aid. On the June 7 episode of Raw, Benoit and Edge faced off against La Résistance (Sylvain Grenier and Robért Conway) and Kane in a handicap tag team match. The match saw Kane perform a chokeslam and pin Benoit for the win.

The other featured preliminary match was Randy Orton versus Shelton Benjamin in a singles match for Orton's Intercontinental Championship. On the May 17 episode of Raw, Randy Orton was giving a speech. Shelton Benjamin interrupted Orton's speech and challenged Orton to an Intercontinental Championship match. The challenge, however, was denied by Orton, in which prompted Benjamin to attack Orton. On the May 24 episode of Raw, an all-out brawl ensued between Orton and Chris Jericho. The brawl brought out fellow Evolution member, Batista, to Orton's aid. Benjamin also made his way to the ring and evened the sides. As a result of the brawl, Bischoff announced a tag team match, in which Benjamin and Jericho defeated Orton and Batista. On the May 31 episode of Raw, it was announced that Orton would defend the Intercontinental Championship against Benjamin at Bad Blood.

== Event ==
Other on-screen personnel
Role:	Name:
English commentators	Jim Ross
English commentators	Jerry Lawler
Spanish commentators	Carlos Cabrera
Spanish commentators	Hugo Savinovich
Interviewers	Jonathan Coachman
Interviewers	Todd Grisham
Ring announcer	Lilian Garcia
Referee	Mike Chioda
Referee	Chad Patton
Referee	Jack Doan
Referee	Earl Hebner

Before the event went live on pay-per-view, Batista defeated Maven in a match taped for Heat, one of WWE's secondary television programs.

=== Preliminary matches ===
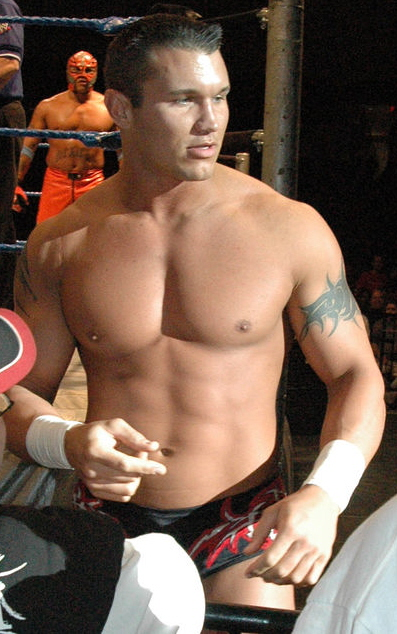
Randy Orton defended the Intercontinental Championship at the event

After Heat, the pay-per-view began with a tag team match for the World Tag Team Championship, where La Résistance (Sylvain Grenier and Robért Conway) defended the titles against Chris Benoit and Edge. La Résistance gained the early advantage when Conway grabbed Edge and rammed him onto the security wall, back first. At one point, Benoit applied a crossface submission hold on Grenier. Kane's pyrotechnics went off and Kane made his way to the ring, and he entered the ring and delivered a Big Boot to Benoit, prompting the referee to end the match in a disqualification, thus La Résistance retained the World Tag Team Championship.

The second match was Tyson Tomko, accompanied by Trish Stratus, versus Chris Jericho. In the early stages both competitors wrestled inconclusively, reversed each other's attacks, before Tyson backed Jericho into the ring corner and hit him numerous times with his elbows. Afterwards, Jericho attempted to perform the Lionsault, but Tomko rolled out of the way. The match concluded as Jericho performed an enzuigiri on Tomko for the win.

The next match was for the WWE Intercontinental Championship, in which Randy Orton defended the championship against Shelton Benjamin. The match began with Benjamin performing a drop kick on Orton, which knocked him out to the outside of the ring. Benjamin proceeded to knock Orton over the security barricade into the crowd. Orton got the advantage, after Ric Flair made his way to the ring, distracting Benjamin in the process. The match came to an end when Benjamin went off the top rope and dove onto Orton, but Orton rolled through and hooked Benjamin's tights to pin Benjamin for the three count and retaining the Intercontinental Championship.

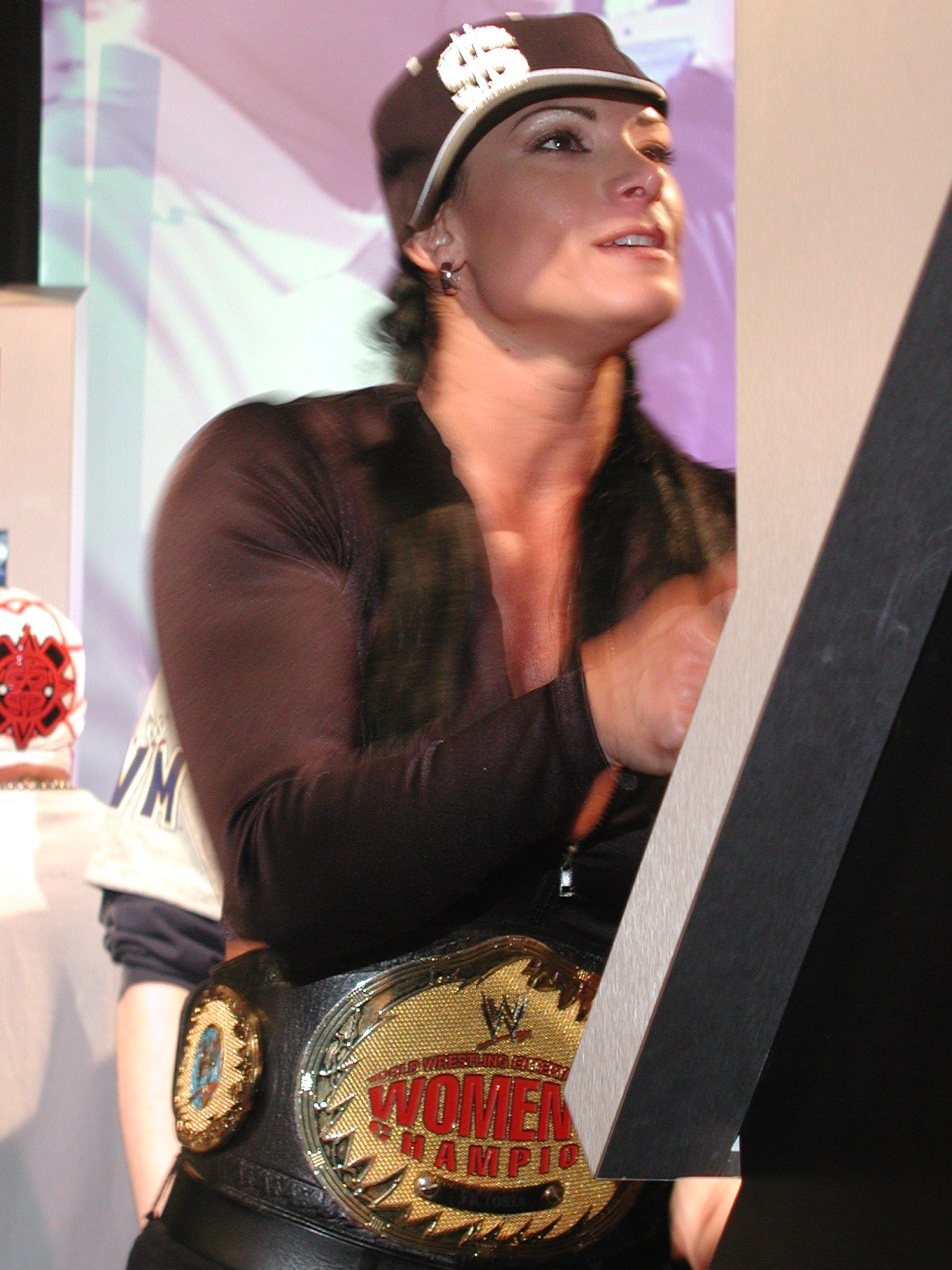
Victoria as WWE Women's Champion

The match that followed was a fatal four-way match for the WWE Women's Championship, with Victoria defending the title against Trish Stratus, Lita, and Gail Kim. The start of the match saw Victoria and Lita double team Stratus, however, Stratus avoided the assault, as she rolled out of the ring. Lita and Victoria went on to double team Kim, however, Stratus pulled Lita out of the ring, afterward Victoria performed a moonsault and landed on Kim's torso. Lita then hit Kim with a DDT. Stratus then went on to use a roll up on Lita to gain a pinfall victory, becoming Women's champion for a fifth time.

The fifth match was between Eugene and Jonathan Coachman. The match started with Eugene hitting an arm drag on Coachman and hitting numerous headbutts. An unknown woman in a bikini came out to the ringside area with some cookies, Coachman offered cookies to Eugene. The woman lured Eugene out of the ring and Eugene went over and grabbed some cookies. As Eugene went to grab more cookies, Coachman slammed Eugene's head into the cookie tray. A spot in the match saw Garrison Cade come out to ringside with a stuffed animal, which prompted Cade to tear up said toy animal. Cade tried to hold Eugene so Coachman could get the advantage, however, Eugene was able to dodge the attack, as Coachman ended up hitting Cade instead. Eugene hit a Rock bottom and a People's Elbow then pinned Coachman for the win.

=== Main event matches ===
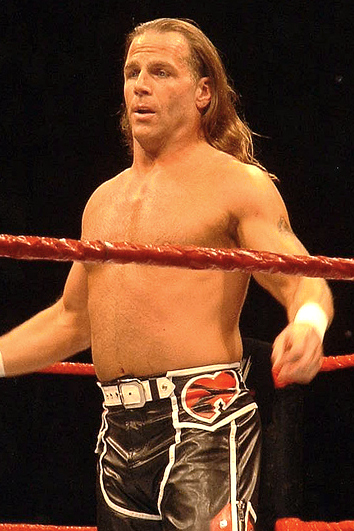
Shawn Michaels lost to Triple H in a Hell in a Cell match at the event

The featured preliminary match was for the World Heavyweight Championship in which Chris Benoit defended the championship against Kane. Benoit started the match by delivering chops to Kane. Mid-way in the match, Benoit charged towards Kane, but Kane delivered a sidewalk slam and tossed him over the top rope to the arena floor. Kane then stepped out of the ring and grabbed Benoit to launch him into the ring post, but Benoit was able to reverse Kane's attack, and slammed him into the ring post. After blocking a Crippler crossface attempt, Kane chokeslammed Benoit for a near-fall. The match concluded when Kane attempted a flying clothesline but Benoit countered it with the Crippler crossface, which Kane fought out of. Benoit rolled Kane up in a pin to retain the World Heavyweight Championship.

The main event was the Hell in a Cell match between Shawn Michaels and Triple H. The match began with Michaels delivering a Thesz Press and slamming Triple H into the cell wall, resulting in Triple H bleeding. Triple H got the advantage, as he was able to counter a piledriver and performed a back body drop on Michaels. Another attack saw Triple H hit Michaels with the steel steps, which resulted in Michaels bleeding. A spot in the match saw Michaels lay Triple H on a table, as he climbed onto a ladder that he took out from under the ring, and performed a diving elbow drop onto Triple H through the table. Triple H performed a Pedigree on Michaels for a near-fall. Michaels performed Sweet Chin Music on Triple H for a near-fall. Triple H performed two Pedigrees on Michaels for the win. After the match, Michaels was given a standing ovation by the audience.

== Reception ==
The Nationwide Arena usually can accommodate 19,500, but the capacity was reduced for the event. This event grossed over $494,000 from an approximate attendance of 9,000. It also received 264,000 pay-per-view buys. Bad Blood helped WWE earn $21.6 million in revenue from pay-per-view events versus $16.9 million the previous year, which was later confirmed by Linda McMahon, the CEO of WWE, on September 7, 2005, in a quarterly result. Canadian Online Explorer's professional wrestling section rated the event a five out of 10 stars. The rating was higher than the Bad Blood event in 2003, which rated a four out of 10 stars. The World Heavyweight Championship match between Chris Benoit and Kane was rated an eight out of 10 stars. Additionally, the match between Eugene and Jonathan Coachman was rated zero out of 10 stars.

The event was released on DVD on July 13, 2004. The DVD was distributed by the label, Sony Music Entertainment. The DVD reached third on Billboard's DVD Sales Chart for recreational sports during the week of August 28, 2004, although falling thereafter. It remained in the chart for two consecutive weeks, until the week of September 25, 2004, when it ranked 19th.

== Aftermath ==
Following Bad Blood, Raw commentator Jim Ross tried making amends between Shawn Michaels and Triple H by making them shake hands. As Michaels and Triple H extended their hands to shake, however, Kane came out and attacked Michaels, with Kane, in storyline, crushing Michaels' throat with a wedged chair. Michaels was then taken out in an ambulance for medical attention. Lita's pregnancy was scripted into a storyline. On the June 21 episode of Raw, it appeared that Lita's then-boyfriend, Matt Hardy was going to propose to Lita, having found out she was pregnant, but he was interrupted by Kane, who claimed to be the father of Lita's child. Two months later, it was revealed that Kane was, indeed, the father. At SummerSlam, the rivalry between Kane and Hardy intensified, when they were booked in a "Till Death Do Us Part" match, with the stipulation that Lita would be obliged to marry the winner. Kane won the match, leading to him marrying a reluctant Lita on an episode of Raw. On the August 30 episode of Raw, Kane revealed that Eric Bischoff's wedding gift to them was to name any match he wanted for at the September annual event, Unforgiven. Continuing with the scripted angle, Lita informed Kane that his opponent at the event was Shawn Michaels. At Unforgiven, Michaels defeated Kane in a no disqualification match.

On the June 21 episode of Raw, a number one contender's match between Eugene and Triple H was scheduled in which the winner would face Chris Benoit for the World Heavyweight Championship. The match, however, ended in a No Contest. On the June 28 episode of Raw, a rematch for the World Heavyweight Championship between Benoit and Kane took place. A stipulation was placed that Benoit had to win the match by submission, while Kane could win by pinfall, submission, disqualification or countout. Benoit won the match, after he made Kane submit to a crossface. At Vengeance, Benoit defeated Triple H to retain his Championship.

A heated confrontation between Randy Orton and Edge was seen, with Edge spearing Orton. The following week, it was announced that Orton would defend the Intercontinental Championship against Edge at Vengeance. Weeks leading to the event, both men took the upper hand over one another. At Vengeance, Orton lost the Intercontinental Championship to Edge.

After this 2004 event, Bad Blood was discontinued as it was doubly replaced by One Night Stand and Vengeance in June the following year. Due to its discontinuation, the 2004 event was also the last Bad Blood event to be broadcast in 4:3 format, as in January 2008, all WWE shows began airing in high definition. After 13 years, WWE announced that Bad Blood would be revived and held on July 9, 2017; however, these plans were scrapped in favor of an event titled Great Balls of Fire. After 20 years since the 2004 event, Bad Blood would be revived as a one-off event for October 5, 2024, the 27-year anniversary of the first Bad Blood. This 2024 event broke Bad Blood's tradition of featuring a Hell in a Cell match as the main event as the match instead opened the show.

This Bad Blood would also be the final to feature the previous World Heavyweight Championship, as well as the original versions of the World Tag Team Championship and the WWE Women's Championship. The World Tag Team Championship was retired in August 2010 in favor of continuing the WWE Tag Team Championship, which was renamed as the Raw Tag Team Championship in 2016 and then the World Tag Team Championship in 2024. The WWE Women's Championship was unified with the WWE Divas Championship (introduced in 2008) in September 2010 and it was retired in favor of the Divas Championship, which itself was retired in April 2016 in favor of a new WWE Women's Championship. The World Heavyweight Championship was retired after it was unified with the WWE Championship in December 2013, and then a new World Heavyweight Championship was introduced in April 2023.

== Results ==
No.	Results	Stipulations	Times
1^{H}	Batista defeated Maven by pinfall	Singles match	3:44
2	Chris Benoit and Edge defeated La Résistance (Sylvain Grenier and Robért Conway) (c) by disqualification	Tag team match for the World Tag Team Championship	10:13
3	Chris Jericho defeated Tyson Tomko (with Trish Stratus) by pinfall	Singles match	6:04
4	Randy Orton (c) defeated Shelton Benjamin by pinfall	Singles match for the WWE Intercontinental Championship	15:03
5	Trish Stratus (with Tyson Tomko) defeated Victoria (c), Lita and Gail Kim by pinfall	Fatal four-way match for the WWE Women's Championship	4:43
6	Eugene defeated Jonathan Coachman by pinfall	Singles match	7:38
7	Chris Benoit (c) defeated Kane by pinfall	Singles match for the World Heavyweight Championship	18:14
8	Triple H defeated Shawn Michaels by pinfall	Hell in a Cell match	47:24
(c) / – the champion(s) heading into the match; H / – the match was broadcast prior to the pay-per-view on Sunday Night Heat
