= WWE Bad Blood =

Pay-per-view and livestreaming event series

- WWE Bad Blood logo as of 2024
- Promotions: WWE
- Brands: Raw (2003–2004, 2024); SmackDown (2024)
- First event: Badd Blood: In Your House (1997)
- Signature matches: Hell in a Cell match

WWE Bad Blood is a professional wrestling event produced by WWE, a Connecticut-based professional wrestling promotion. The event was first held in October 1997 when the promotion was still called the World Wrestling Federation (WWF) and that first event was held as the 18th In Your House pay-per-view (PPV) event. After six years and after the promotion had been renamed to World Wrestling Entertainment (WWE), Bad Blood returned as its own PPV event in June 2003, replacing King of the Ring. In 2005, One Night Stand replaced Bad Blood; Vengeance had also moved to June that year as The Great American Bash moved to July. Bad Blood had been announced to be revived in 2017; however, these plans were scrapped in favor of an event titled Great Balls of Fire. After a 20-year hiatus, Bad Blood returned in October 2024, and became the first Bad Blood to air on WWE's livestreaming platforms.

The first Bad Blood is known for introducing the Hell in a Cell match, a 20-foot high roofed cell structure that surrounds the ring and ringside area. It has been contested at every Bad Blood with the match headlining the events in 1997, 2003, and 2004. To coincide with the first brand extension, the 2003 and 2004 Bad Blood events were both held exclusively for wrestlers of the Raw brand division. The brand split ended in 2011 but it returned in 2016. Since April 2018, all of WWE's main roster PPV and livestreaming events have featured wrestlers from both the Raw and SmackDown brands.

== History ==
Bad Blood logo used for 2003 and 2004 events.

Bad Blood was first held as an In Your House pay-per-view (PPV) event. In Your House was a series of monthly PPVs first produced by the World Wrestling Federation (WWF, now WWE) in May 1995. They aired when the promotion was not holding one of its major PPVs and were sold at a lower cost. Badd Blood: In Your House was the 18th In Your House event and took place on October 5, 1997, at the Kiel Center in St. Louis, Missouri. The event was notable for introducing the Hell in a Cell match and the debut of Kane.

In May 2002, the WWF was renamed to World Wrestling Entertainment (WWE) as a result of a lawsuit from the World Wildlife Fund over the "WWF" initialism. Also around this time, the promotion held a draft that split its roster into two distinctive brands of wrestling, Raw and SmackDown!, where wrestlers were exclusively assigned to perform. In 2003, WWE reinstated Bad Blood as its own PPV (with the stylization being "Bad Blood" instead of the previous "Badd Blood") to replace the previously annual King of the Ring PPV; King of the Ring ceased being produced as a PPV (until 2024), but the titular tournament continued to be produced periodically. To coincide with the brand extension, both the 2003 and 2004 Bad Blood events, which were both held in June, exclusively featured wrestlers from the Raw brand. Like the original event, the 2003 and 2004 events featured a Hell in a Cell match as the main event. After the 2004 event, however, Bad Blood was discontinued and doubly replaced by One Night Stand and Vengeance; the latter had also moved into the June slot as The Great American Bash moved into the July slot that Vengeance previously held.

In March 2017, WWE announced that it would be reviving Bad Blood to be held on July 9, 2017, from the XL Center in Hartford, Connecticut. However, these plans were scrapped in favor of an event titled Great Balls of Fire. After 20 years since the last Bad Blood event, WWE announced that Bad Blood would in fact return and be held at the State Farm Arena in Atlanta, Georgia on October 5, 2024, the 27-year anniversary of the first Bad Blood. Like the previous editions, the 2024 event also featured the Hell in a Cell match but it opened that year's show instead of closing it. This would also be the first Bad Blood to air via WWE's livestreaming platforms, a medium that WWE began using in 2014. The event also featured wrestlers from both Raw and SmackDown as WWE's pay-per-view and livestreaming events have featured wrestlers from both since 2018.

== Events ==
| Raw-branded event |

| # | Event | Date | City | Venue | Main event | Ref. |
|---|---|---|---|---|---|---|
| 1 | Badd Blood: In Your House | October 5, 1997 | St. Louis, Missouri | Kiel Center | Shawn Michaels vs. The Undertaker in a Hell in a Cell match to determine the number one contender for the WWF Championship at Survivor Series | |
| 2 | WWE Bad Blood (2003) | June 15, 2003 | Houston, Texas | Compaq Center | Triple H (c) vs. Kevin Nash in a Hell in a Cell match for the World Heavyweight Championship with Mick Foley as the special guest referee | |
| 3 | WWE Bad Blood (2004) | June 13, 2004 | Columbus, Ohio | Nationwide Arena | Triple H vs. Shawn Michaels in a Hell in a Cell match | |
| 4 | WWE Bad Blood (2024) | October 5, 2024 | Atlanta, Georgia | State Farm Arena | Cody Rhodes and Roman Reigns vs. The Bloodline (Solo Sikoa and Jacob Fatu) | |
(c) – refers to the champion(s) heading into the match

== See also ==
- WWE Hell in a Cell
