= WWE Bad Blood (2024) =

Professional wrestling premium live event

Bad Blood
- Promotional poster featuring CM Punk and Drew McIntyre
- Promotion: WWE
- Brand(s): Raw; SmackDown
- Date: October 5, 2024
- City: Atlanta, Georgia
- Venue: State Farm Arena
- Attendance: 16,902

WWE event chronology
← Previous; NXT No Mercy	Next → NXT Halloween Havoc

Bad Blood chronology
← Previous; 2004	Next → Final

The 2024 Bad Blood, also promoted as Bad Blood: Atlanta, was a professional wrestling premium live event (PLE) produced by WWE, held for wrestlers from the promotion's main roster brands, Raw and SmackDown. It was the fourth and final Bad Blood and took place on Saturday, October 5, 2024, at the State Farm Arena in Atlanta, Georgia, which was the 27-year anniversary of the first event that also featured the first Hell in a Cell match. WWE wrestlers Naomi and reigning WWE Women's Tag Team Champions Bianca Belair and Jade Cargill served as hosts of the event.

This was the first Bad Blood since 2004, the first to feature multiple brands, as the 2003 and 2004 events were both held exclusively for Raw, the first held on a Saturday, the first to air on WWE's livestreaming platforms, and the first to be broadcast in high definition. It would in turn be the first Bad Blood branded as a "premium live event", a term the company introduced at the start of 2022 to refer to its events airing on pay-per-view (PPV) and via livestreaming. This was also the first WWE event to take place on the same night as an Ultimate Fighting Championship (UFC) PPV after the two companies merged to form TKO Group Holdings in September 2023. As a result, Bad Blood had a start time of 6:00 p.m. Eastern Time to avoid counter programming against UFC 307. The official theme song for the event was "GTA" by Future and Metro Boomin.

Five matches were contested at the event. In the main event, which was the main match from SmackDown, Cody Rhodes and Roman Reigns defeated The Bloodline (Solo Sikoa and Jacob Fatu) in a tag team match. In the opening bout, which was Raw's main match, CM Punk defeated Drew McIntyre in a Hell in a Cell match, which marked the first Bad Blood in which the Hell in a Cell match opened the show as it was the main event match of the three prior editions. The event also marked the returns of Raquel Rodriguez, Jimmy Uso, and The Rock, as well as appearances by former WWE ring announcer Lilian Garcia, former multiple-time WWE Women's Champion Mickie James, and WWE Hall of Famers Booker T, Jacqueline, Arn Anderson, Tully Blanchard, and Goldberg.

The event received generally positive reviews, with the Hell in a Cell match between CM Punk and Drew McIntyre receiving acclaim for its brutality and as the culmination of their 10-month feud.

== Production ==
=== Background ===
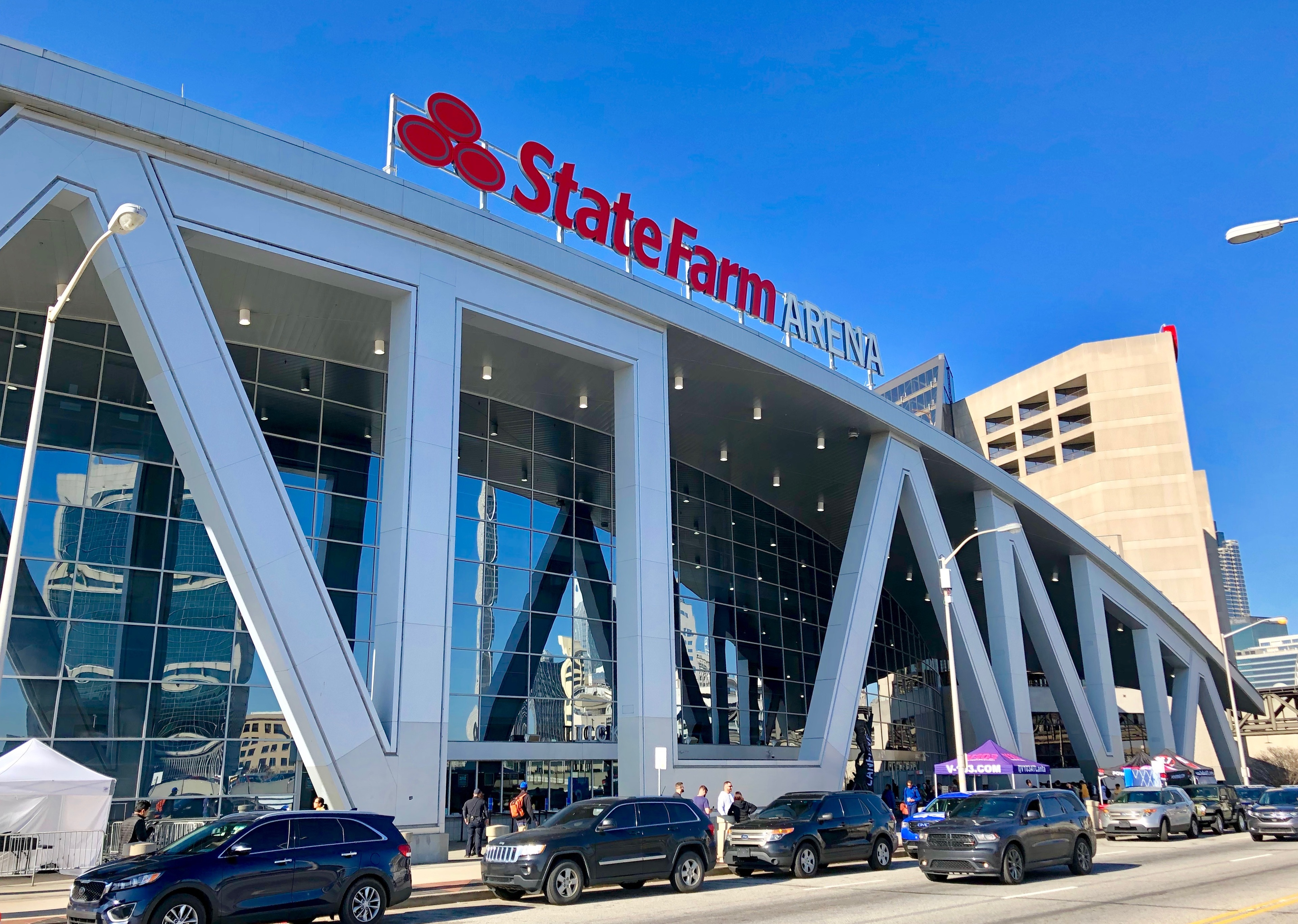
The fourth Bad Blood, and the first since 2004, was held at the State Farm Arena in Atlanta, Georgia.

Bad Blood is a professional wrestling event produced by the American promotion WWE. It was first held as the 18th In Your House pay-per-view (PPV) event on October 5, 1997. After six years, Bad Blood returned as its own PPV event, with both the 2003 and 2004 editions taking place in June and held exclusively for wrestlers of the Raw brand. In 2005, Bad Blood was doubly replaced by One Night Stand and Vengeance, which were both held in June that year. Bad Blood was originally to be reinstated in July 2017, but these plans were scrapped in favor of an event titled Great Balls of Fire. The original Bad Blood also introduced the Hell in a Cell match, a 20-foot-high roofed cell structure that surrounds the ring and ringside area, and it was featured as the main event of all three prior events.

On July 6, 2024, WWE uploaded a YouTube video featuring Undisputed WWE Champion Cody Rhodes and American record producer Metro Boomin, both residents of Atlanta, Georgia, where they officially announced the return of Bad Blood after 20 years; Metro and Future's song "GTA" (featuring Young Thug), from the 2024 album We Don't Trust You, was subsequently announced as the official theme song of the event on September 27. The fourth Bad Blood was scheduled for Atlanta's State Farm Arena on Saturday, October 5, 2024, the 27-year anniversary of the first Bad Blood, with the event promoted as Bad Blood: Atlanta, and also marked the first Bad Blood held on a Saturday. Tickets went on sale on July 19 via Ticketmaster.

The event featured wrestlers from the Raw and SmackDown brand divisions, which made it the first Bad Blood to feature multiple brands during a brand split, and it was co-hosted by SmackDown wrestlers Naomi and reigning WWE Women's Tag Team Champions, Bianca Belair and Jade Cargill. This was also the first Bad Blood to be branded as a "premium live event" (PLE), a term the company introduced on January 1, 2022, to refer to its events that are available on PPV and via livestreaming.

=== Broadcast outlets ===
The PLE was broadcast on traditional PPV outlets worldwide. It was also available to livestream on Peacock in the United States, SonyLIV in India, Disney+ Hotstar in Indonesia, Disney+ in the Philippines, Binge in Australia, Abema in Japan, and the WWE Network everywhere else. As this was the first Bad Blood held since 2004, it was the first time for the event to be available on WWE's livestreaming platforms, as the WWE Network launched in 2014, and then between 2021 and 2023, it merged under the other platforms for those respective countries.

To avoid counter programming against UFC 307, which took place the same night at the Delta Center in Salt Lake City, Utah, Bad Blood had an earlier start time of 6:00 p.m. Eastern Time. This was subsequently the first time that both WWE and Ultimate Fighting Championship (UFC) held an event on the same night since the two companies merged to become subsidiaries of TKO Group Holdings in September 2023.

=== Storylines ===
The event included five matches that resulted from scripted storylines. Results were predetermined by WWE's writers on the Raw and SmackDown brands, while storylines were produced on WWE's weekly television shows, Monday Night Raw and Friday Night SmackDown.

At SummerSlam, Liv Morgan defeated Rhea Ripley to retain the Women's World Championship after seemingly accidental interference from Ripley's on-screen love interest and Judgment Day stablemate, "Dirty" Dominik Mysterio. Following the match, however, Mysterio turned on Ripley and kissed Morgan, ending their partnership. Later that night, fellow Judgment Day member Damian Priest lost the World Heavyweight Championship after he was betrayed by fellow stablemate Finn Bálor. Bálor subsequently excommunicated Priest and Ripley from the group, with the faction now consisting of Bálor, Mysterio, Morgan, JD McDonagh, and Carlito. A mixed tag team match between the Terror Twins (Priest and Ripley) and Judgment Day (Mysterio and Morgan) then occurred at Bash in Berlin, which The Terror Twins won with Ripley pinning Morgan, despite interference from the rest of The Judgment Day. On the following episode of Raw, Morgan attacked Ripley and injured her leg, while later that night, Priest and Jey Uso teamed up to defeat The Judgment Day (Bálor and McDonagh). The following week, it was announced that Morgan would defend her championship against Ripley in a rematch at Bad Blood, while Priest and Bálor also agreed to a match at the event. On the September 23 episode, it was announced that Mysterio would be locked in a shark cage suspended above the ring during Ripley and Morgan's match.

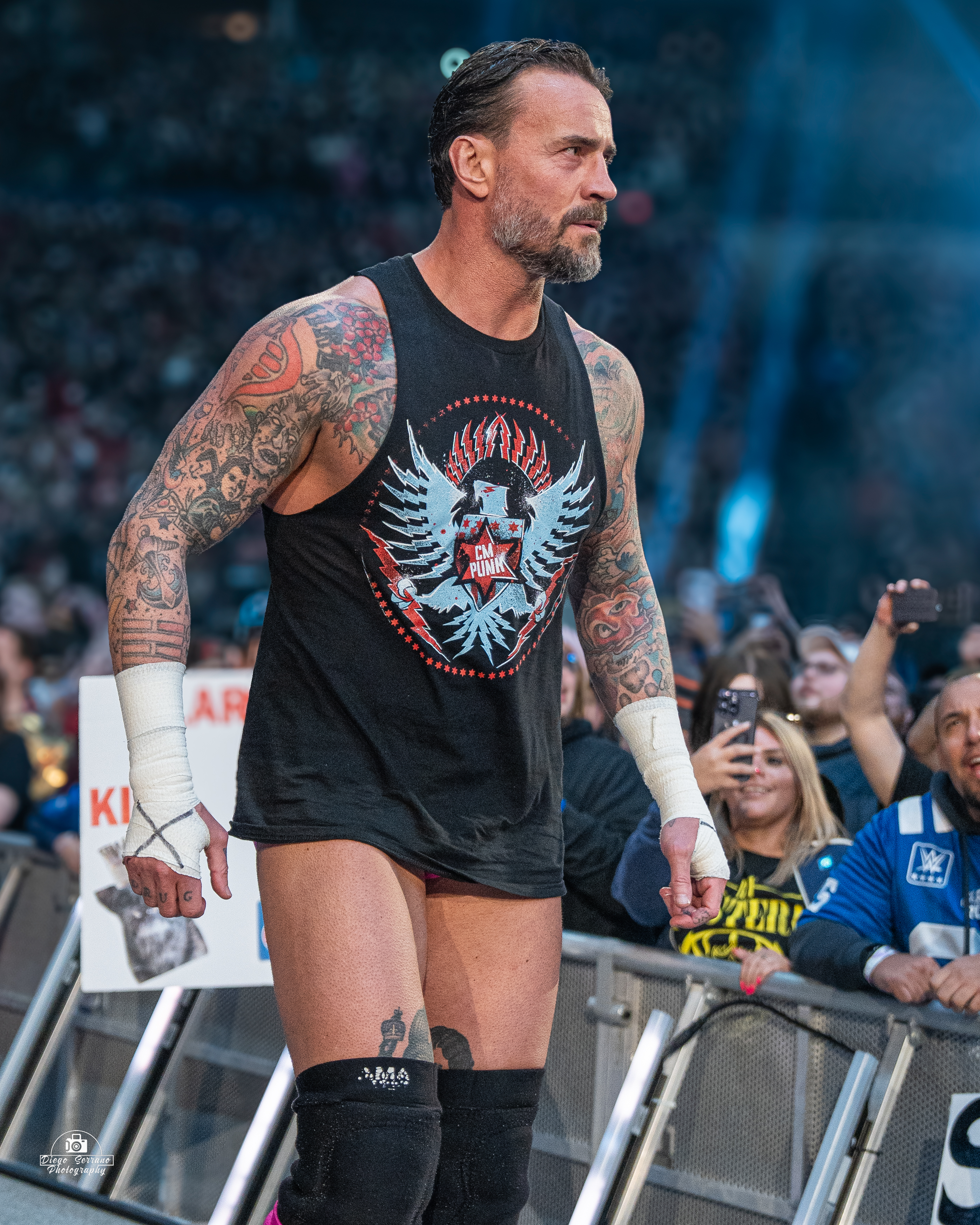
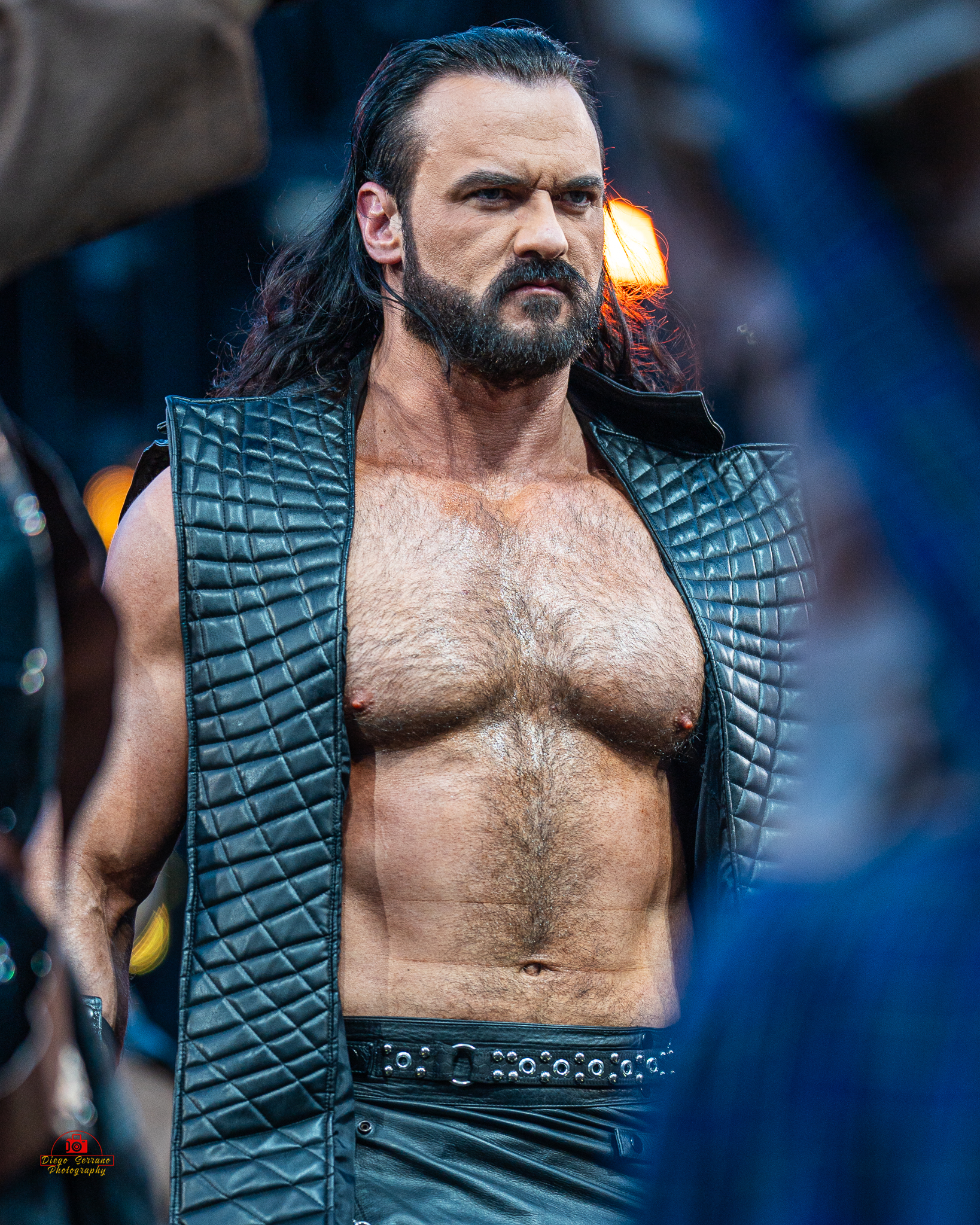
CM Punk and Drew McIntyre brought their 10-month rivalry to an end inside Hell in a Cell.

At the Royal Rumble in January, CM Punk eliminated Drew McIntyre in the men's Royal Rumble match. During the match, McIntyre legitimately injured Punk's triceps after a botched landing of the Future Shock DDT. Over the next few months, McIntyre taunted Punk on social media for causing his injury. Punk retaliated by costing McIntyre the World Heavyweight Championship at WrestleMania XL in April, at Clash at the Castle in McIntyre's home country in June, and at Money in the Bank in McIntyre's namesake cash-in match in July. At SummerSlam, McIntyre defeated Punk, which featured Seth "Freakin" Rollins as the special guest referee. This led to a rematch at Bash in Berlin, which was contested as a strap match, which Punk won. During the climax of the match, Punk retrieved the bracelet that McIntyre had stolen some weeks ago. This bracelet was a gift to Punk which was adorned with his wife (AJ Lee) and dog's (Larry) names. On the following episode of Raw, McIntyre brutally attacked Punk and snapped the bracelet. On the next episode, McIntyre claimed that he ended Punk's career, only for Raw General Manager Adam Pearce to inform McIntyre that he would be facing Punk in a Hell in a Cell match at Bad Blood.

At King and Queen of the Ring in May, SmackDown's Nia Jax won the Queen of the Ring tournament, earning a match for her brand's WWE Women's Championship at SummerSlam, where she defeated Bayley to win the title after interference from her ally, Tiffany Stratton. On the August 30 episode of SmackDown, Stratton interfered in Jax's title defense, however, Stratton was impeded by a returning Bayley. On the September 13 episode, Jax stated that SmackDown General Manager Nick Aldis informed her that she would defend her title at Bad Blood. Bayley appeared and stated that she wanted a rematch. This prompted Naomi to come out and declare that she also wanted a title match. Jax then proposed a tag team match with herself and Stratton against Bayley and Naomi for the following week, albeit with two stipulations: if Bayley and Naomi won, the woman who scored the pinfall would face Jax for the title at Bad Blood; however, if Jax and Stratton won, the woman who was pinned would be forced to leave the SmackDown brand. Bayley and Naomi accepted. On September 20, Aldis announced that the match would be contested as a tornado tag team match, and on SmackDown that night, Bayley and Naomi were declared co-winners as they simultaneously pinned Jax. Aldis then scheduled a match between Bayley and Naomi for the following week where the winner would face Jax for the title at Bad Blood, which was won by Bayley.

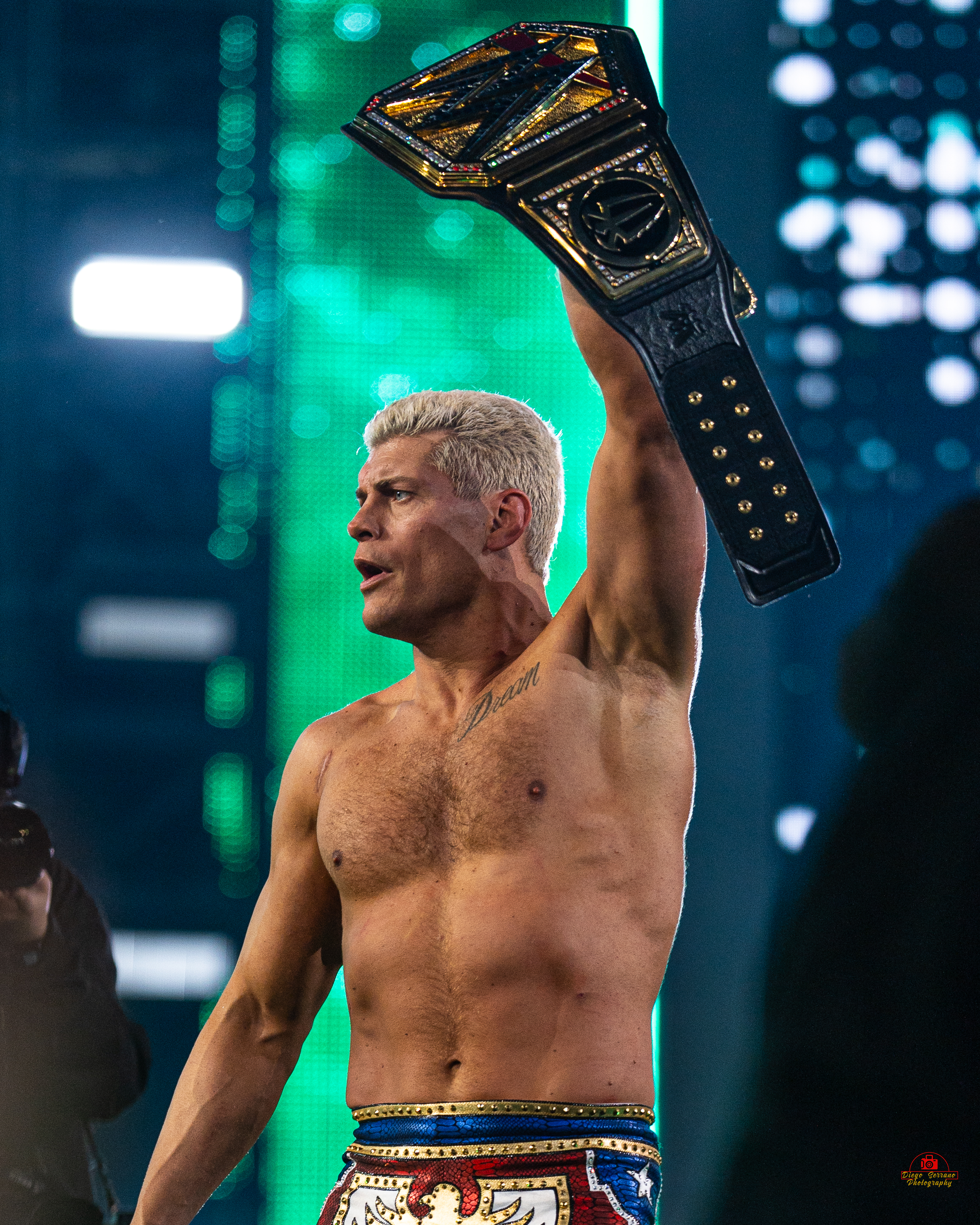
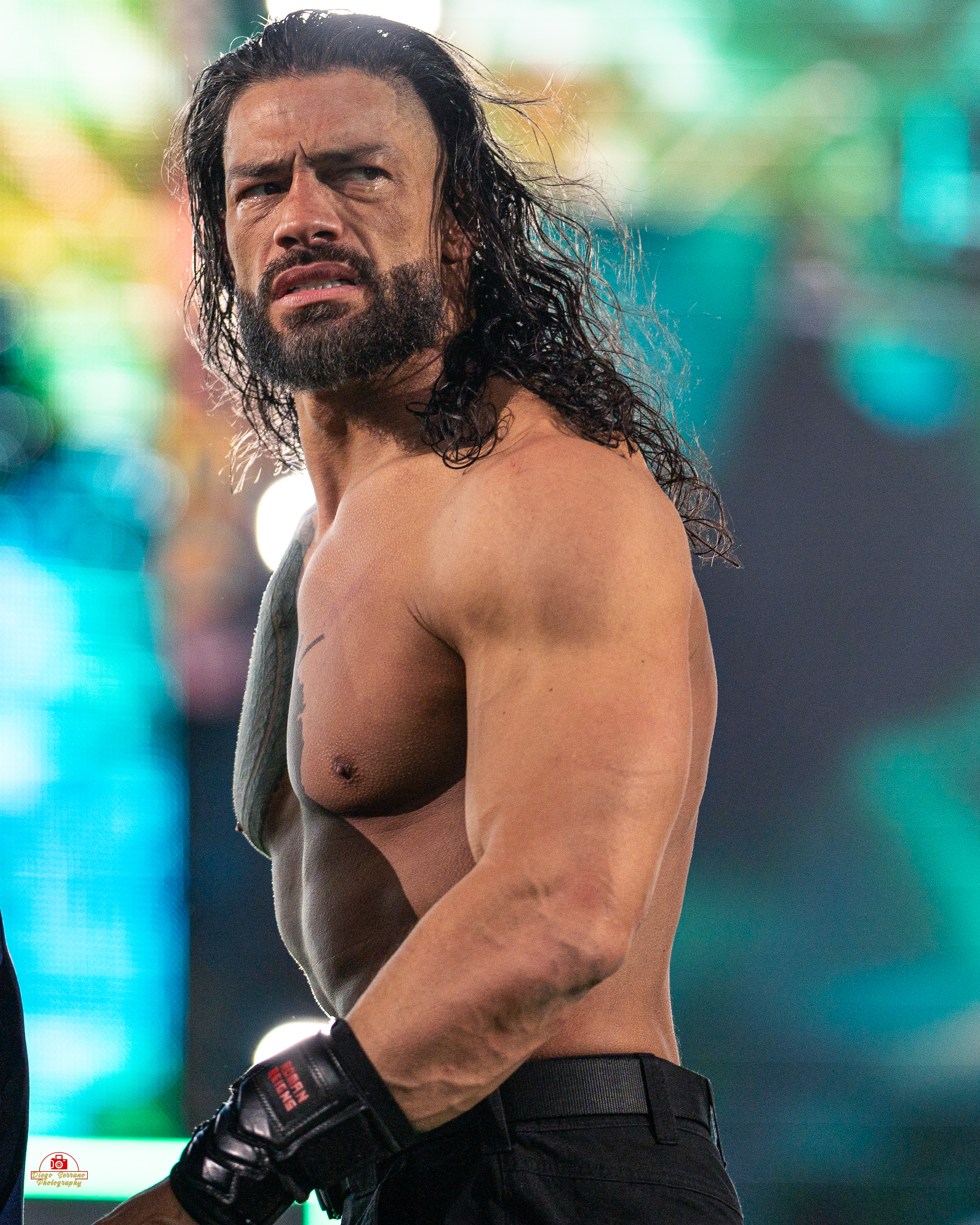
Six months after Cody Rhodes defeated Roman Reigns to win the Undisputed WWE Championship in the main event of WrestleMania XL Night 2, Rhodes and Reigns reluctantly set aside their differences to team up and face The Bloodline (Solo Sikoa and Jacob Fatu)

On Night 2 of WrestleMania XL in April, Cody Rhodes defeated Roman Reigns to win the Undisputed WWE Championship in a Bloodline Rules match, ending Reigns's historic title reign at 1,316 days. (Note: Specifically, his WWE Universal Championship reign ended at 1,316 days while his WWE Championship reign ended at 735 days as from WrestleMania 38 in April 2022 until WrestleMania XL, Reigns had held and defended both titles together as the Undisputed WWE Universal Championship. After his loss, the Universal Championship was retired while the WWE Championship became known as the Undisputed WWE Championship.) After the event, Reigns took an extended hiatus while Solo Sikoa appointed himself as the new leader of The Bloodline, removing Jimmy Uso and manager Paul Heyman from the group while adding The Tongans (Tama Tonga and Tonga Loa) and Jacob Fatu. Sikoa would also begin referring to himself as the new Tribal Chief of the group. Rhodes subsequently began a rivalry with this new iteration of The Bloodline. At SummerSlam, Rhodes defeated Sikoa in a Bloodline Rules match to retain the Undisputed WWE Championship after interference from a returning Reigns. On the September 13 episode of SmackDown, Rhodes successfully defended the title against Sikoa once again, this time in a steel cage match. Following the match, Rhodes was attacked by The Bloodline which prompted Reigns to come out and assist Rhodes. Later that night, Sikoa proposed a tag team match with himself and Fatu against Rhodes and Reigns at Bad Blood. Rhodes initially declined, stating that his feud with The Bloodline was over. Later, Reigns addressed the fans and stated that he did not need Rhodes's help as it was family business. Rhodes appeared, seemingly teasing a title rematch between himself and Reigns, however, both were ambushed by The Bloodline. Rhodes and Reigns then reluctantly signed the contract, thus making the tag team match official for Bad Blood.

== Event ==
Other on-screen personnel
Role:	Name:
Hosts	Bianca Belair
Hosts	Jade Cargill
Hosts	Naomi
English commentators	Michael Cole
English commentators	Corey Graves
Spanish commentators	Marcelo Rodríguez
Spanish commentators	Jerry Soto
Ring announcer	Samantha Irvin
Referees	Jason Ayers
Referees	Shawn Bennett
Referees	Jessika Carr
Referees	Dan Engler
Referees	Daphanie LaShaunn
Interviewers	Cathy Kelley
Interviewers	Jackie Redmond
Pre-show panel	Megan Morant
Pre-show panel	Sam Roberts
Pre-show correspondent	Peter Rosenberg

=== Preliminary matches ===
The opening match of the PLE was the Hell in a Cell match between CM Punk and Drew McIntyre. Punk and McIntyre brawled immediately after the bell rang. Punk had his head busted open by McIntyre who proceeded to grind a wrench in Punk's head wound. Punk then threw a toolbox onto McIntyre's head, busting him open as well. Punk and McIntyre exchanged their Go To Sleep knee and Claymore kick finishers, but both kicked out of the pinfall attempts. Punk would then put McIntyre in the Sharpshooter submission hold. After McIntyre hit a superplex on Punk through a table, Punk hit another GTS but McIntyre responded by hitting Punk with White Noise on the ring steel steps. Punk would then put McIntyre in the Anaconda Vice submission hold. McIntyre would gain the advantage with a low-blow on Punk. McIntyre then retrieved a black bag thought to contain thumbtacks, but would actually contain bracelet beads that resembled the bracelet Punk had containing the letters of his wife AJ Lee and dog Larry. McIntyre dumped the beads on Punk's head and prepared to finish Punk. Punk was able to avoid McIntyre's Claymore kick, which made McIntyre land on the steel steps with his lower back. After tying a steel chain around his left knee, Punk took a handful of bracelet beads and stuffed them in McIntyre's mouth, reenacting what McIntyre did to Punk several weeks prior on Raw after destroying the bracelet. Punk then used his left knee that had the steel chain wrapped around it to hit the GTS on McIntyre to win the match and end their feud.

In the second match, Nia Jax defended the WWE Women's Championship against Bayley. Bayley used her speed and aggression to gain an advantage, while Jax used her size and strength to counter. In the climax of the match, Bayley hit a pop-up stunner on Jax who proceeded to inadvertently fall onto the referee. Bayley was able to hit her Rose Plant finisher on Jax but could not earn the pinfall due to the referee being incapacitated. This allowed Tiffany Stratton to run into the ring and attack Bayley. As Stratton was considering to cash-in her Money in the Bank briefcase, Jax recovered and caught Stratton red-handed. Stratton ultimately decided not to cash in and distract Bayley. This distraction allowed Jax to hit a Samoan drop on Bayley from the second rope, followed by the Annihilator finisher on Bayley to retain the title.

The third match was between Damian Priest and Finn Bálor. Priest took control of the match early, though Bálor used his speed and agility to counter Priest's size. After exchanging blows, Priest gained the advantage when he hit Bálor with an apron powerbomb. Shortly after, Bálor's Judgment Day stablemates Carlito and JD McDonagh arrived to interfere. After Priest took out Carlito and McDonagh, Balor was able to hit his Coup de Grace stomp finisher on Priest twice for a nearfall. After catching Bálor on his third Coup de Grace attempt, Priest hit his South of Heaven chokeslam on Bálor to win the match.

Next, WWE Chief Content Officer Paul "Triple H" Levesque came to the ring for a major announcement. Triple H announced that at Crown Jewel, the reigning men's and women's world champions would face each other in an annual event. While the world titles won't be contested at the event, the respective winners of the men's and women's matches would be named Crown Jewel Champion. Shortly after, World Heavyweight Champion Gunther arrived and touted his confidence in winning the Crown Jewel Championship. Gunther then noticed WWE Hall of Famer Goldberg, who was in attendance with his son Gage, a college football linebacker for the Colorado Buffaloes football team. Gunther then insulted Goldberg's parenting skills, prompting Goldberg to hop the barricade and confront Gunther. As security and WWE officials separated Goldberg from Gunther, Sami Zayn, who was set to challenge for the title on the following episode of Raw, arrived and attacked Gunther. The segment ended with Goldberg warning Gunther "You're Next".

In the fourth match, Liv Morgan defended the Women's World Championship against Rhea Ripley. A stipulation for the match was that Morgan's on-screen love interest and Judgment Day stablemate "Dirty" Dominik Mysterio had to be suspended in the air in a shark cage. Morgan would target Ripley's left knee (which had been previously injured) to gain an advantage and was able to hit a Codebreaker, but Ripley was able to overcome it. During the match, Mysterio was able to unlock the shark cage but got his foot caught and was left hanging from the cage. After hitting Riptide on Morgan in the ring, Ripley decided not to pin Morgan yet after seeing Mysterio hanging from the cage. Ripley grabbed a kendo stick and proceeded to repeatedly strike Mysterio with it. The attack would continue until Raquel Rodriguez, having returned after a seven-month hiatus, appeared and attacked Ripley. As a result, Ripley won the match via disqualification. However, since championships do not change hands via disqualification or countout unless otherwise stipulated, Morgan remained champion.

=== Main event ===
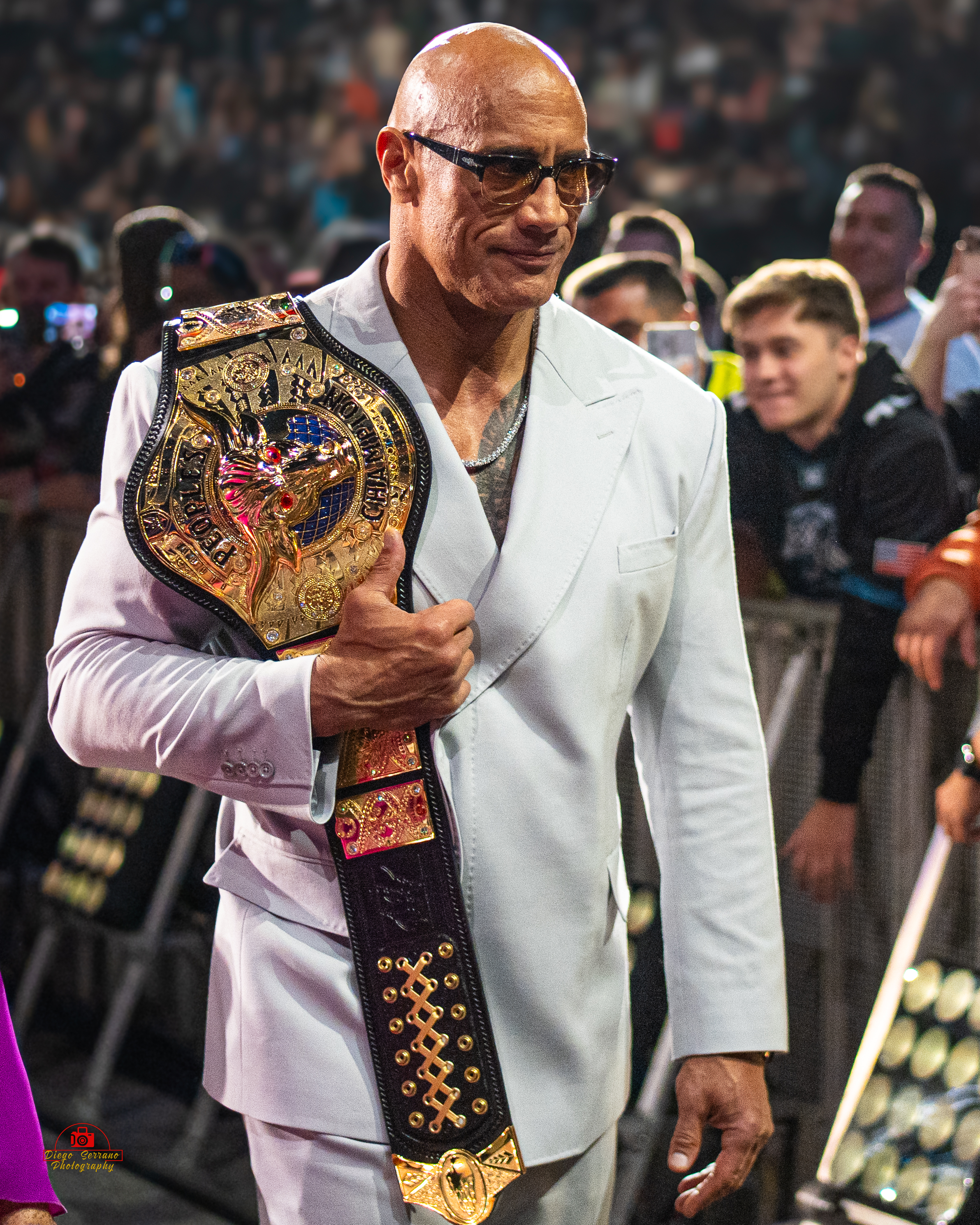
Dwayne "The Rock" Johnson made a surprise appearance after the main event

In the main event, Undisputed WWE Champion Cody Rhodes and Roman Reigns faced off against Solo Sikoa and Jacob Fatu of The Bloodline in a tag team match. Rhodes and Fatu started the match for their respective teams. Despite an early offensive flurry from Rhodes that included a Disaster Kick, Fatu brushed it off no worse for wear. Shortly after Reigns and Sikoa tagged in and began a physical exchange. After Reigns started to gain the upper hand, Fatu's interference gave the Bloodline the advantage. After receiving a series of hip attacks in a ring corner from Sikoa and then Fatu, Reigns was able to make the hot tag to Rhodes. Rhodes landed consecutively a scooped power slam, the Bionic Elbow and Cody Cutter on Fatu. Before Rhodes could hit his Cross Rhodes finisher, Sikoa provided a distraction that allowed Fatu to hit a pop-up Samoan Drop on Rhodes. Fatu and Sikoa then isolated Rhodes from Reigns for a lengthy beatdown. Rhodes finally escaped and provided a hot tag to Reigns, turning the tide. After Sikoa kicked out of a crucifix pin, Reigns hit his Superman Punch on Sikoa and was set to hit his spear finisher before Fatu interfered. Fatu and Sikoa hit a series of superkicks on Reigns then hitting a jump-up moonsault/top-rope splash combination, but Rhodes broke the pinfall. Rhodes recovered and brawled with Fatu outside the ring. Rhodes sent Fatu through a ringside barricade into the timekeeper's area, but an unfazed Fatu started throwing chairs at Rhodes. After hitting the Cross Rhodes on Fatu ringside Rhodes proceeded to place Fatu on the announce table. After saluting Reigns, Rhodes hit a top-rope splash on Fatu through the announce table. In the ring, Sikoa and Reigns exchanged blows before Reigns landed another Superman Punch on Sikoa. Before he could hit his spear finisher, Reigns was distracted by WWE Tag Team Champions Tama Tonga and Tonga Loa. Sikoa was able to hit a Spear on Reigns for a nearfall. As Sikoa looked to hit his Samoan Spike on Reigns, Sikoa was distracted by the arrival of a hooded individual. After neutralizing Tama and Loa, the hooded individual was revealed to be Jimmy Uso, having returned after a six-month hiatus. This allowed Reigns to hit the Spear on Sikoa to win the match.

After the match, Reigns and Uso embraced one another as Rhodes returned to the ring. After sharing a word with Rhodes, Reigns left the ring with Uso. Rhodes was then immediately jumped by the Bloodline, prompting Reigns and Uso to come to Rhodes' aid as they fought off the Bloodline. As Rhodes, Reigns, and Uso stood tall in the ring, Reigns returned the Undisputed WWE Championship to Rhodes. The Rock then made a surprise appearance and stared down Reigns, Rhodes, and Uso from the entranceway. Without saying anything, The Rock counted to three and made a throat-slash gesture before leaving.

== Reception ==
The event received generally positive reviews, with the Hell in a Cell match between CM Punk and Drew McIntyre being singled out for praise, and was awarded a 5-star rating by Dave Meltzer of the Wrestling Observer Newsletter, becoming both Punk's third five-star match and his first since his match against John Cena at Money in the Bank, and McIntyre's second ever five-star match each in WWE, as well as the highest-rated match of the event. The other matches received the following ratings from Meltzer: the WWE Women's Championship match received 1 3/4 stars (the lowest score of the event), the Damian Priest-Finn Bálor match 3 1/4 stars, the Women's World Championship match 2 stars, and the tag team main event 4 1/4 stars.

== Aftermath ==
=== Raw ===
CM Punk opened the following episode of Raw to thank the fans who loved him, his peers, and those who hated him because without them he would not have achieved success in WWE.

Women's World Champion Liv Morgan teamed with Raquel Rodriguez to take on Rhea Ripley's team on the October 14 episode of Raw. The match ended in a no-contest when WWE Women's Champion Nia Jax interfered. Morgan was planned to defend the Women's World Championship against Ripley in a rematch at Crown Jewel, but Ripley suffered a legitimate orbital bone injury. Ripley was then written off television on the October 29 episode of NXT, where Morgan and Rodriguez attacked Ripley in the parking lot of the WWE Performance Center.

Lilian Garcia, who made her first WWE appearance since 2019 during the event, returned to Raw for the first time in 15 years on the October 21 episode as a ring announcer. She was subsequently announced as having become a full-time ring announcer for the brand, replacing Samantha Irvin who left the company.

Goldberg would confront World Heavyweight Champion Gunther on the June 16, 2025, episode of Raw, setting up a match between them for Saturday Night's Main Event XL, which would also be Goldberg's retirement match.

=== SmackDown ===
After the event, fan footage from outside State Farm Arena showed Cody Rhodes at his tour bus about to prepare for the post-show press conference when Kevin Owens confronted him. Rhodes and Owens argued, which escalated when Owens attacked Rhodes, turning Owens heel for the first time since 2022, and disbanding the trio of Rhodes, Owens, and Randy Orton. Security and WWE officials were able to separate them. Paul "Triple H" Levesque addressed the issue, stating that it would be handled internally. This would eventually lead to a match between Orton and Owens at Crown Jewel.

On the following episode of SmackDown, Jimmy Uso told Roman Reigns they needed help against Solo Sikoa's Bloodline (Tama Tonga, Tonga Loa, and Jacob Fatu), insinuating to bring back Jimmy's brother Jey Uso, who had left the group on his own terms a year ago and was moved over to Raw, but Reigns was against the idea. Jimmy then appeared on the October 14 episode of Raw to make amends himself, but Jey declined. Sikoa and his Bloodline wanted to recruit Jey but they caused Jey to lose his Intercontinental Championship the following week, and Jey caused The Tongans to lose the WWE Tag Team Championship on the October 25 episode of SmackDown. Later, Jey and Jimmy embraced, reuniting The Usos, while Reigns watched on. It was then announced that Reigns and The Usos would take on Sikoa, Fatu, and Tama in a six-man tag team match at Crown Jewel.

== Results ==
No.	Results	Stipulations	Times
1	CM Punk defeated Drew McIntyre by pinfall	Hell in a Cell match	31:25
2	Nia Jax (c) defeated Bayley by pinfall	Singles match for the WWE Women's Championship	14:10
3	Damian Priest defeated Finn Bálor by pinfall	Singles match	12:45
4	Rhea Ripley defeated Liv Morgan (c) (with "Dirty" Dominik Mysterio) by disqualification	Singles match for the Women's World Championship; Mysterio was suspended above the ringside area in a shark cage.	14:00
5	Cody Rhodes and Roman Reigns defeated The Bloodline (Solo Sikoa and Jacob Fatu) by pinfall	Tag team match	25:50
(c) / – the champion(s) heading into the match
