= WWE Bad Blood (2003) =

World Wrestling Entertainment pay-per-view event

Bad Blood
- Promotional poster featuring Goldberg and Triple H
- Promotion: World Wrestling Entertainment
- Brand: Raw
- Date: June 15, 2003
- City: Houston, Texas
- Venue: Compaq Center
- Attendance: 10,000
- Buy rate: 385,000

Pay-per-view chronology
← Previous; Insurrextion	Next → Vengeance

Bad Blood chronology
← Previous; In Your House	Next → 2004

The 2003 Bad Blood was a professional wrestling pay-per-view (PPV) event produced by World Wrestling Entertainment (WWE). It was the second Bad Blood and took place on June 15, 2003, at the Compaq Center in Houston, Texas, held exclusively for wrestlers from the promotion's Raw brand division.

This was the first Bad Blood held since 1997, which had been produced as the 18th In Your House event, in turn making this the first Bad Blood held under the WWE name as the company was renamed from World Wrestling Federation (WWF) to WWE in May 2002, and also the first Bad Blood held after WWE introduced the brand split in March 2002. This 2003 event replaced the previously annual King of the Ring PPV and marked the beginning of worldwide PPVs (with the exception of the "Big Four" of Royal Rumble, WrestleMania, SummerSlam, and Survivor Series) being brand exclusive (the UK-exclusive PPVs, Insurrextion and Rebellion, had been brand exclusive since 2002).

The main event was a Hell in a Cell match, where Triple H defeated Kevin Nash to retain the World Heavyweight Championship. Two predominant bouts were featured on the undercard; in respective singles matches, Ric Flair defeated Shawn Michaels and Goldberg defeated Chris Jericho.

The event marked the second time the Hell in a Cell format was used by WWE at a Bad Blood event; the first was at the inaugural Bad Blood in 1997. The 2003 Bad Blood event grossed over US$500,000 ticket sales from an attendance of 10,000. This event helped WWE increase its yearly pay-per-view revenue by $6.2 million from the previous year. When the event was released on DVD, it reached a peak position of second on Billboard's DVD Sales Chart.

== Production ==
=== Background ===
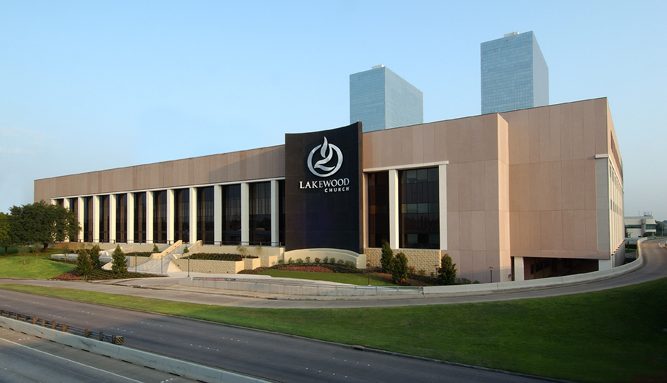
The event was held at the Compaq Center in Houston, Texas.

From May 1995 to February 1999, World Wrestling Entertainment (WWE), at the time known as the World Wrestling Federation (WWF), ran a series of professional wrestling pay-per-view (PPV) events titled In Your House. They aired when the promotion was not holding one of its then-five major PPVs (WrestleMania, King of the Ring, SummerSlam, Survivor Series, and Royal Rumble) and were sold at a lower cost. Following the St. Valentine's Day Massacre: In Your House event in February 1999, the In Your House branding was retired with the company transitioning to giving each monthly PPV a permanent identity.

The 18th In Your House was held as Badd Blood: In Your House in October 1997. After six years and after the promotion had been renamed from WWF to WWE in May 2002, WWE reinstated Bad Blood (restylizing "Badd" as "Bad") as its own PPV event to be held on June 15, 2003, at the Compaq Center in Houston, Texas, replacing the previously annual King of the Ring PPV. It was also made exclusive to wrestlers of the Raw brand, a storyline subdivision called the brand extension that was introduced in March 2002 in which the promotion divided its roster into two separate brands, Raw and SmackDown!, where wrestlers were exclusively assigned to perform.

=== Storylines ===
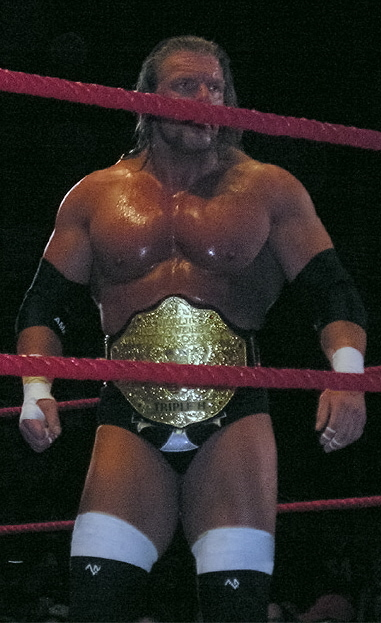
Triple H as the World Heavyweight Champion

The event featured eight professional wrestling matches that involved different wrestlers from pre-existing scripted feuds, plots and storylines. Wrestlers portrayed either villains or fan favorites as they followed a series of events which built tension, leading to a wrestling match. All wrestlers were from the Raw brand – a storyline division in which WWE assigned its employees to a different program.

The main event at Bad Blood featured World Heavyweight Champion Triple H defending the title against Kevin Nash in a Hell in a Cell match. The buildup to the match began at Backlash, where Triple H nailed Kevin Nash with a sledgehammer during a six man tag team match, enabling Triple H to pin Nash for the victory. At Judgment Day, Nash defeated Triple H in a singles match via disqualification, but didn't win the championship. On the May 19 episode of Raw, after Triple H successfully defended the World Heavyweight Championship against Ric Flair, Co-General Manager "Stone Cold" Steve Austin announced that due to Nash winning at Judgment Day by disqualification, Nash would face Triple H again at Bad Blood for the World Heavyweight Championship in a Hell in a Cell match. On the May 26 episode of Raw, the feud between the two wrestlers intensified when Randy Orton and Triple H attacked Nash. On the June 2 episode of Raw, Nash teamed with Shawn Michaels and The Hurricane defeated Evolution in a tag team match. After the match, Nash delivered a Jackknife powerbomb to Triple H. On the June 9 episode of Raw, Austin announced that Mick Foley would officiate the Hell in a Cell match as the guest referee.

One of the featured preliminary matches was Shawn Michaels versus Ric Flair in a singles match. The hype to this match began on the May 26 episode of Raw, where Michaels challenged Flair to a singles match for later during the show, which Flair accepted. As the match was about to take place, Co-General Manager Eric Bischoff announced that the Flair versus Michaels match was to take place instead at Bad Blood. Later that night, Flair and Michaels lost to Triple H in a handicap match after Flair betrayed Michaels, enabling Triple H to finish him off with the Pedigree. On the June 2 episode of Raw, Michaels and Flair were in a promo, where they both discussed who was the better wrestler. Later, Michaels, along with Kevin Nash and The Hurricane, defeated Evolution. The feud between Flair and Michaels enhanced on the June 9 episode of Raw. During the show, Flair and Michaels managed Randy Orton and The Hurricane, respectively; after Orton defeated The Hurricane, Flair and Michaels brawled until the program went into a commercial break.

The other featured preliminary match was Goldberg versus Chris Jericho in a singles match. The buildup to the match began on the May 12 episode of Raw, where a "mystery assailant" attempted to run Goldberg over with a vehicle, though Goldberg was able to avoid it. Later that night, Goldberg went on to defeat Christian in a Steel Cage match. On the May 19 episode of Raw, it was revealed that Lance Storm was the "mystery assailant". He, however, told Austin that he was only hired to run Goldberg over, and that Jericho conspired the attack. On the May 26 episode of Raw, Jericho held a in-ring segment titled The Highlight Reel. During the segment, he explained that he conspired the attack because he grew jealous towards Goldberg's success in WCW, disliking Goldberg's ego and felt that since joining WWE, he had achieved everything he had ever wanted in his career, especially becoming the first WWE Undisputed Champion in history and all that was left was to defeat Goldberg and challenged him to a singles match at Bad Blood. Afterwards, Goldberg came down to the ring and accepted Jericho's challenge, and as he was about to perform a spear, Jericho sprayed Goldberg's eyes with pepper spray.

A non-physical rivalry developed between the Co-General Managers, "Stone Cold" Steve Austin and Eric Bischoff, who were feuding over who was the better authority. On the June 2 episode of Raw, it was announced that both men would face each other in a series of non-wrestling contests labeled the "Redneck Triathlon" at Bad Blood. The contests would include a belching contest, a pie eating contest, and a singing contest.

== Event ==
Other on-screen personnel
Role:	Name:
English commentators	Jim Ross
English commentators	Jerry Lawler
Spanish commentators	Carlos Cabrera
Spanish commentators	Hugo Savinovich
Interviewers	Jonathan Coachman
Interviewers	Terri Runnels
Referees	Charles Robinson
Referees	Nick Patrick
Referees	Chad Patton
Referees	Earl Hebner
Referees	Jack Doan
Referees	Mick Foley (Hell in a Cell match)

=== Sunday Night Heat ===
Before the event aired live on pay-per-view, Ivory faced Molly Holly on Sunday Night Heat, one of WWE's secondary TV programs. Ivory won via pinfall after a Poison Ivory.

=== Preliminary matches ===
When the pay-per-view began, The Dudley Boyz (Bubba Ray Dudley and D-Von Dudley) faced Rodney Mack and Christopher Nowinski. The Dudley Boyz initially dominated the match and executed the Wassup? on Nowinski. During the match, Theodore Long, Mack and Nowinski's manager, verbally distracted D-Von, resulting in D-Von punching Long and distracting the referee. Nowinski hit Bubba Ray with a face mask that he wore. After the referee placed his attention to the match, Nowiniski pinned Bubba Ray for the win.

After the tag team match, "Stone Cold" Steve Austin defeated Eric Bischoff in the first contest in the "Redneck Triathlon", a belching contest.

The second match was Scott Steiner versus Test in which the winner would earn the managing services of Stacy Keibler. In the early stages, both competitors wrestled inconclusively until Steiner performed a Belly to belly suplex on Test. Test attempted to hit Steiner with a chair but the chair hit Test. Steiner performed the Steiner Flatliner to win the match and Keibler's managing services.

In the next match, Christian faced Booker T for the Intercontinental Championship. The match began with Booker T executing a spinebuster. Booker T won the match by disqualification after Christian hit him with the title belt, meaning Christian retained the title.

After that, "Stone Cold" Steve Austin faced Eric Bischoff in the second round of the Redneck Triathlon; they have to place their face on Mae Young's crotch. Bischoff won after Austin forfeited, performing a Stunner on Young.

In the next match, Kane and Rob Van Dam faced La Résistance (René Duprée and Sylvan Grenier) for the World Tag Team Championship. This was the final pay-per-view that featured a masked Kane until the 2012 Royal Rumble. La Résistance gained the early advantage when Grenier performed a DDT on RVD. Kane and Van Dam, however, regained control when Kane chokeslammed Duprée. Towards the end, Kane brawled with Grenier and Duprée at ringside, prompting Van Dam to perform an aerial technique onto ringside. La Résistance, however, avoided the attack resulting in Van Dam landing on Kane. In the ring, while Kane was still at ringside, La Resistance performed a double spinebuster on Van Dam, proceeding into a pinfall to win the World Tag Team Championship.

=== Main event matches ===
In the first main match, Goldberg faced Chris Jericho. In the early stages of the match, Jericho and Goldberg fought at ringside. During this tussle, Goldberg attempted to execute a spear on Jericho, who was positioned on the security barricade; Jericho, however, avoided the attack as Goldberg broke through the security barricade. Goldberg was billed as being injured, prompting Jericho to apply several submission holds on Goldberg's injured shoulder. After remaining in control for the duration of the match, Goldberg was able to counter Jericho's Walls of Jericho and execute the Jackhammer on him. Goldberg then covered Jericho for the pinfall.

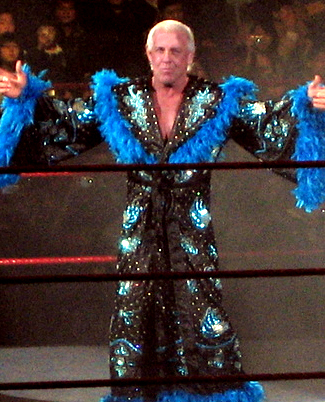
Ric Flair faced Shawn Michaels at the event

In the next main match, Ric Flair faced Shawn Michaels. During the match, Michaels set up a table at ringside and positioned Flair on it. Randy Orton then came through the audience and attempted to interfere in the match, but Michaels performed Sweet Chin Music on him and put Flair through the table with a Splash. Near the end of the match, Michaels knocked the referee down and as he was about to perform Sweet Chin Music on Flair, it allowed Orton to hit Michaels with a chair. Orton then placed Flair on top of Michaels and ran out of the ring. When the referee recuperated, he saw the cover and officiated the pinfall made by Flair.

After the match, the final contest in the "Redneck Triathlon" was held. Originally it was supposed to be a singing contest, though both men agreed to change it into a pigpen contest, where the objective was to throw your opponent into a pigpen. "Stone Cold" Steve Austin threw Eric Bischoff into a pigpen set up near the Bad Blood entrance stage, thus Austin won the triathlon 2–1.

In the main event, Triple H faced Kevin Nash inside Hell in a Cell for the World Heavyweight Championship, with Mick Foley as the guest referee. During the start of the match, both men used a steel chair, a hammer, and the cell to their advantage. Eventually, Nash hit Triple H with a barbed wire bat many times before Triple H hit him with the steel steps. As Triple H brought a sledgehammer into the ring, Foley attempted to take it away from him, resulting in Triple H hitting Foley and Nash with a steel chair. Foley began to gush blood from the chair shot. Foley then stuck a stinky sock into Triple H's mouth as retaliation, but Triple H broke up the hold and knocked Foley to the floor. Triple H then delivered a Pedigree to Nash. During this time, Foley had recuperated and was able to officiate the pinfall made by Triple H on Nash, thus Triple H retained the World Heavyweight Championship.

== Reception ==
The Compaq Center had a maximum capacity of 16,285, which was reduced for Bad Blood. The event grossed US$500,000 in ticket sales from an attendance of 10,000—the maximum allowed. The event retailed as $34.95, but was offered free of charge to members of the United States armed forces who were returning from the Iraq War. Not counting the buys from military personnel, the event received 285,000 pay-per-view buys. The promotion's pay-per-view revenue was $24.7 million, which was greater than the following year's revenue of $18.5 million. Canadian Online Explorer's professional wrestling section rated the event a four out of ten possible points. The main event was rated a five out of ten possible points, while the standard match between Ric Flair and Shawn Michaels rated a seven and a half out of ten possible points. Pro Wrestling Torch, a newsletter and wrestling website in operation since 1987, rated the event a three and a half out of ten possible points.

The event was released on DVD on August 18, 2003. The DVD was distributed by Sony Music Entertainment. The DVD debuted on Billboard's Top Weekly DVD sales chart on September 6, 2003, reaching a peak position of second. The DVD remained on the chart for eight more weeks, ranking lower every week. The DVD finally ranked on October 25, 2003 reaching a final position of 19th. The DVD also received reviews from customers; the average customer rating from Amazon.com was a three out of five possible stars.

== Aftermath ==
After Bad Blood, "Stone Cold" Steve Austin announced an Elimination Chamber match to take place at SummerSlam for the World Heavyweight Championship. The match featured Triple H, Chris Jericho, Goldberg, Kevin Nash, Randy Orton, and Shawn Michaels; at SummerSlam, Triple H won the match to retain the World Heavyweight title. The storyline between Ric Flair and Michaels ended when Michaels was announced as a participant in the Elimination Chamber match, in which Flair would not participate. Although their feud ended, the feud reengaged five years later in 2008. At WrestleMania XXIV, Michaels defeated Flair in a Career Threatening match. As a result, Flair retired from professional wrestling.

Chris Jericho and Goldberg continued to feud over several weeks before being announced as participants in the Elimination Chamber match, in which Goldberg eliminated Jericho. During the weeks leading up to SummerSlam, Kane would turn on Rob Van Dam after the loss of their tag titles, and his unmasking which occurred eight days after this event along with his heel turn, would lead to a No Holds Barred match between the two at SummerSlam in which Kane won, ending their team. La Résistance would engage in a feud with the Dudley Boyz, eventually a match was scheduled for SummerSlam between the two teams over the World Tag Team titles. La Résistance was able to win the match and retain the titles.

Bad Blood would be a short-lived PPV at the time, however, as Bad Blood was discontinued after the 2004 event, which was also Raw-exclusive. The original 1997 event was notable for introducing the Hell in a Cell match, which was featured as the main event match for its first three events. The name would be revived in 2024 and while it also included a Hell in a Cell match, the bout opened the show instead of being the main event.

== Results ==
No.	Results	Stipulations	Times
1^{H}	Ivory defeated Molly Holly by pinfall	Singles match	3:18
2	Christopher Nowinski and Rodney Mack (with Theodore Long) defeated The Dudley Boyz (Bubba Ray Dudley and D-Von Dudley) by pinfall	Tag team match	7:07
3	Scott Steiner defeated Test by pinfall	Singles match for the managerial services of Stacy Keibler	6:23
4	Booker T defeated Christian (c) by disqualification	Singles match for the WWE Intercontinental Championship	7:53
5	La Résistance (René Duprée and Sylvain Grenier) defeated Kane and Rob Van Dam (c) by pinfall	Tag team match for the World Tag Team Championship	5:47
6	Goldberg defeated Chris Jericho by pinfall	Singles match	11:00
7	Ric Flair defeated Shawn Michaels by pinfall	Singles match	14:18
8	"Stone Cold" Steve Austin defeated Eric Bischoff 2–1	Redneck Triathlon	—
9	Triple H (c) defeated Kevin Nash by pinfall	Hell in a Cell match for the World Heavyweight Championship; Mick Foley served as the special guest referee.	21:01
(c) / – the champion(s) heading into the match; H / – the match was broadcast prior to the pay-per-view on Sunday Night Heat

- "Stone Cold" Steve Austin won the "Burping Contest"
- Eric Bischoff won the "Pie Eating Contest" by forfeit
- "Stone Cold" Steve Austin won the "Pig Pen Fun"
