= WWE Great Balls of Fire =

2017 pay-per-view and livestreaming event

Great Balls of Fire
- Promotional poster featuring Brock Lesnar and Samoa Joe
- Promotion: WWE
- Brand: Raw
- Date: July 9, 2017
- City: Dallas, Texas
- Venue: American Airlines Center
- Attendance: 16,559

WWE event chronology
← Previous; Money in the Bank	Next → Battleground

Great Balls of Fire was a 2017 professional wrestling pay-per-view (PPV) and livestreaming event produced by WWE, held exclusively for wrestlers from the promotion's main roster brand, Raw. It took place on July 9, 2017, at the American Airlines Center in Dallas, Texas. The event's title referenced Jerry Lee Lewis's song of the same name, which was used as the event's theme song.

Nine matches were contested at the event, including one on the Kickoff pre-show. In the main event, Brock Lesnar defeated Samoa Joe to retain the Universal Championship. In other prominent matches, Braun Strowman defeated Roman Reigns in an ambulance match, Cesaro and Sheamus retained the Raw Tag Team Championship against The Hardy Boyz (Jeff Hardy and Matt Hardy) in a 30-minute Iron Man match, and in the opening bout, Bray Wyatt defeated Seth Rollins.

This date's event was originally announced to revive Bad Blood and be held at the XL Center in Hartford, Connecticut, which would have been the first Bad Blood since 2004 and the fourth Bad Blood overall. However, these plans were scrapped in favor of Great Balls of Fire; Bad Blood would instead return in 2024. This would be the only Great Balls of Fire event, as although a follow up was not on WWE's originally planned 2018 schedule, brand-exclusive PPV and livestreaming events for the main roster were discontinued following WrestleMania 34 in April that year, reducing the amount of these events produced per year.

== Production ==
=== Background ===
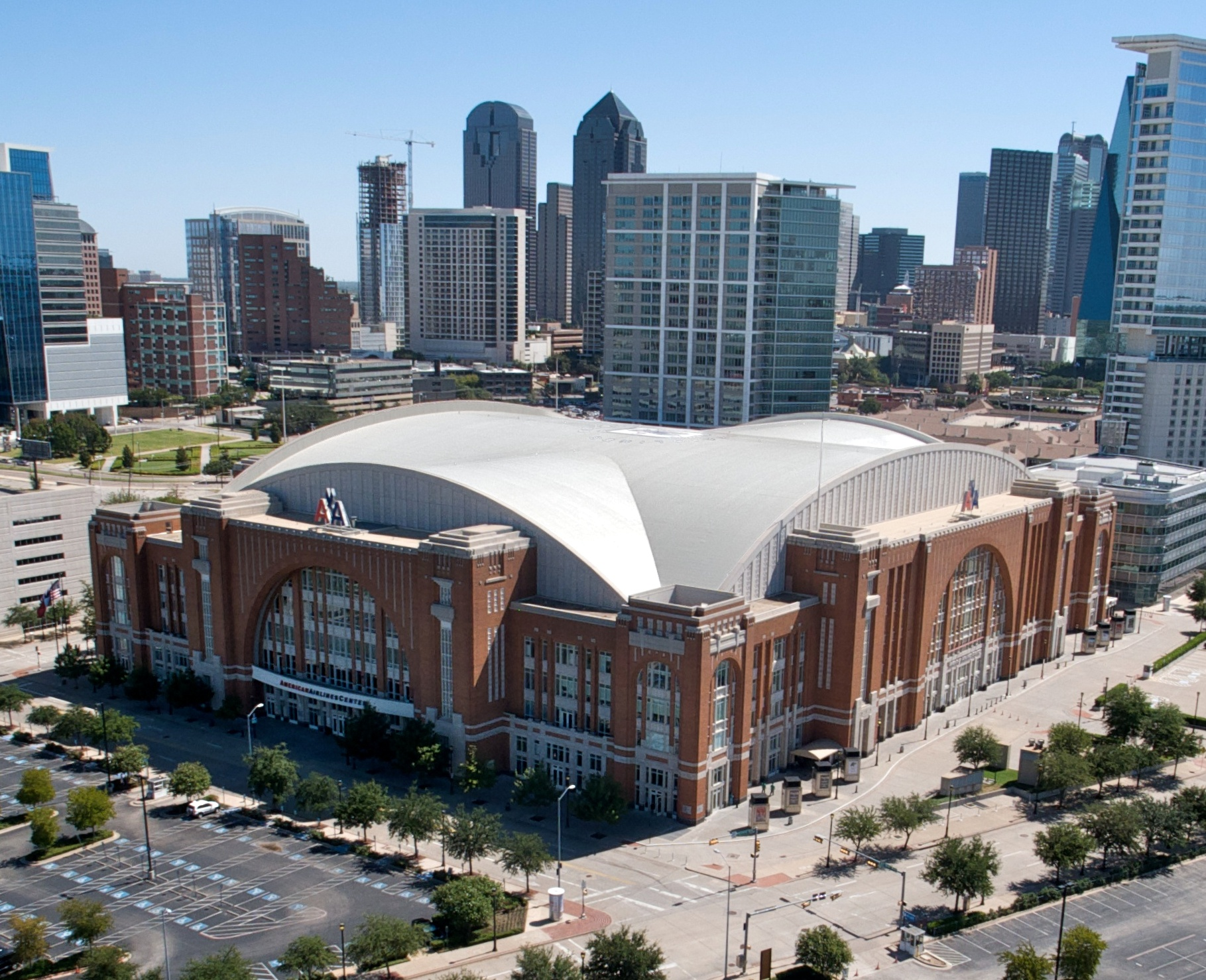
The event was held at the American Airlines Center in Dallas, Texas.

On March 21, 2017, the professional wrestling promotion WWE announced that it would be reinstating the Bad Blood pay-per-view (PPV) event to be held on July 9, 2017, from the XL Center in Hartford, Connecticut. This would have been the fourth Bad Blood event, the first held since 2004, and the first Bad Blood to livestream on the WWE Network. On April 28, however, the company announced that these plans were scrapped in favor of a new PPV and livestreaming event titled Great Balls of Fire, which would instead be held at the American Airlines Center in Dallas, Texas on July 9. Tickets went on sale on May 5 through Ticketmaster. To coincide with the brand extension that was reintroduced in July 2016, in which the promotion again split its main roster between the Raw and SmackDown brands where wrestlers were exclusively assigned to perform, the event was held exclusively for Raw.

The event's title referenced Jerry Lee Lewis's song of the same name, which was ultimately used as the event's theme song. WWE Hall of Famer Jerry Lawler stated that his personal attorney, who also represented Lewis, had asked him about pursuing legal action over the title, but that he "called them and got everything worked out", including securing rights to use the song itself as part of the event. The name received negative criticism on social media.

=== Storylines ===
The event comprised nine matches, including one on the Kickoff pre-show, that resulted from scripted storylines. Results were predetermined by WWE's writers on the Raw brand, while storylines were produced on WWE's weekly television shows, Monday Night Raw and the cruiserweight-exclusive 205 Live.

After Brock Lesnar won the Universal Championship at WrestleMania 33, Lesnar's advocate Paul Heyman teased a match between Lesnar and Roman Reigns as they were the only two men to have defeated The Undertaker at WrestleMania. Lesnar was notably absent from Raw for several weeks due to his status as a part-time wrestler. During this time, Reigns, Braun Strowman, Seth Rollins, Finn Bálor, Bray Wyatt, and Samoa Joe each expressed their desire to challenge Lesnar for the Universal Championship. Due to Strowman being sidelined from an arm injury, General Manager Kurt Angle scheduled an extreme rules fatal five-way match at Extreme Rules between the remaining five, with the winner earning a title match at Great Balls of Fire. Joe won the match and confronted Heyman the following night on Raw, stating that he did not fear Lesnar and wanted to face him. Joe then applied the "Coquina Clutch" on Heyman to send a message to Lesnar, who returned the following week and got into a brawl with Joe, which was broken up by the Raw locker room. On the June 26 episode, as Lesnar was making his entrance, Joe ambushed Lesnar from behind and applied the "Coquina Clutch" on him three times, nearly causing Lesnar to pass out. Joe stopped the third attempt only after some other wrestlers pulled him off of Lesnar. On the final Raw before Great Balls of Fire, the two had a live split-screen interview. They taunted each other and an enraged Joe left to find where Lesnar was. He eventually found him, but was held back by security.

On the April 3 episode of Raw, Braun Strowman, who had been feuding with Roman Reigns since the Royal Rumble, interrupted Universal Champion Brock Lesnar and indicated his desire to face him for the title, but left before a fight could occur. Strowman then continued his feud with Reigns, defeated him at Payback, and assaulted him after the match and again on Raw Talk, when Reigns was about to be taken to a medical facility. However, Reigns retaliated by slamming an ambulance door against Strowman's arm multiple times. The next night on Raw, General Manager Kurt Angle informed the audience that both men were injured. The following week, Strowman, wearing a sling on his arm, indicated that he would target the Universal Champion after finishing off Reigns. Later that night, Reigns attacked Strowman during the latter's match, targeting his arm with a steel chair. Strowman required surgery and was expected to be inactive for up to six months. On the June 19 episode of Raw, Reigns proclaimed himself to be the number one contender for the Universal Championship at SummerSlam. Later that night, Strowman returned in an ambulance, costing Reigns his match against Samoa Joe. Strowman attacked Reigns and challenged him to an ambulance match at Great Balls of Fire. The following week, Reigns accepted the challenge and an ambulance appeared at the stage; Reigns went to investigate, but Strowman attacked him and put him into the ambulance. On the final Raw before Great Balls of Fire, Strowman attempted to put Apollo Crews, who he had just defeated, in an ambulance, but as he opened the door, Reigns was in the ambulance and attacked Strowman. The two brawled that ended with Reigns executing a spear on Strowman off the stage and both crashed through a table and boxes.

At Extreme Rules, Alexa Bliss retained the Raw Women's Championship against Bayley. The following night on Raw, General Manager Kurt Angle scheduled Bliss to defend the title against Nia Jax, as Bliss had said that she would give Jax a shot after she was through with Bayley. Bliss won the match by disqualification after getting Mickie James and Dana Brooke, who were at ringside, to attack her. On the June 12 episode, Sasha Banks, Brooke, and James defeated Bliss, Jax, and the returning Emma after Bliss abandoned her partners. The following week, during a match between Jax and Banks, Emma confronted Bliss, and a brawl broke out also involving Brooke, James, and Bayley, who came out to help Banks. Angle then scheduled a six-woman gauntlet match for the June 26 episode where the winner would face Bliss for the Raw Women's Championship at Great Balls of Fire. Jax eliminated Bayley, James, Brooke, and Emma before being eliminated by Banks via submission. Bliss then came out to confront her, but Banks attacked her and posed with the title belt.

On the May 15 episode of Raw, Seth Rollins was scheduled to face Bray Wyatt as part of the buildup to their fatal five-way match at Extreme Rules. Wyatt and Rollins insulted each other prior to their match which Rollins won by disqualification after Samoa Joe interfered. On the June 5 episode of Raw, Rollins wrestled Joe. During the match, Wyatt's music played and distracted Rollins, allowing Joe to win. The following week, Rollins confronted Wyatt, called him a coward, and wondered if the reason Wyatt cost him his match was due to Rollins previously calling him gutless. Wyatt, claiming himself to be a god, said that although Rollins slayed a king (referring to Rollins' victory over Triple H at WrestleMania 33), he cannot slay a god. The next week, as Rollins introduced himself as the cover star of the WWE 2K18 video game, he was interrupted by Wyatt. Wyatt accused Rollins of contradicting the video game's tagline "Be Like No One" by having conformed to the expectations of the audience. Rollins then attacked Wyatt. On the June 26 episode, Wyatt challenged Rollins to a match at Great Balls of Fire, which Rollins accepted. The two cut promos on each other the following week, with Wyatt's promo emanating from a desert.

On the June 6 episode of 205 Live, Titus O'Neil attempted to get Akira Tozawa to join his stable of wrestlers, "The Titus Brand" (later named "Titus Worldwide"). O'Neil continued to try and recruit Tozawa on the June 12 episode of Raw, the following night on 205 Live, and the following week on Raw, after Tozawa defeated TJP. WWE Cruiserweight Champion Neville then complained about being disrespected by Tozawa. O'Neil responded that Tozawa could beat Neville and, with his help, would become Cruiserweight Champion. On the June 26 episode of Raw, O'Neil informed both Neville and Tozawa that he had negotiated a title match between the two at Great Balls of Fire. The following week on 205 Live, O'Neil hyped the Cruiserweight Championship match. Neville interrupted and said that Titus was only concerned with making money, and not the safety of his own clients, as demonstrated by the loss Titus Worldwide member Apollo Crews received from Braun Strowman on the previous night's episode of Raw.

On the May 22 episode of Raw, Enzo Amore was found unconscious backstage after being attacked from behind by an unknown assailant, and again the following week, where The Revival (Dash Wilder and Scott Dawson) became suspects. Raw commentator Corey Graves suggested that Big Cass, Amore's tag team partner, may have behind the attack, which Cass denied, saying that he would never hurt Amore. The following week, Cass was found backstage knocked out. Big Show, in Cass' place, teamed with Amore in a victory over Luke Gallows and Karl Anderson. Later backstage, Cass confronted Show. The following week, Cass was again found unconscious, but still competed with Amore against Gallows and Anderson in a losing effort. Gallows and Anderson tried to attack Amore, but Show made the save while Cass watched. Amore confronted Show regarding Cass being attacked, which Show took offense to and walked away. On the June 19 episode of Raw, General Manager Kurt Angle held a meeting about the attacks on Amore and Cass. After being questioned, Big Show took offense and said that he would not compete on Raw again and left. After Angle cleared The Revival of any wrongdoing, Graves showed video surveillance of Cass staging his own attack from the previous week. Cass admitted that he was behind the attacks on Amore. Cass said that he was tired of Enzo and blamed the fact they never won a championship on him. Cass broke up the team before kicking Amore in the head. The following week, Cass said that he was ashamed of himself for what he did. The two embraced in the ring, but on the stage, Cass attacked Amore. On the July 3 episode, Amore said that he would fight back and the two brawled until Angle separated them and made a match between them at Great Balls of Fire.

At Extreme Rules, The Miz defeated Dean Ambrose to win his seventh Intercontinental Championship. The following night on Raw, Ambrose wanted a rematch, but Miz denied him. Later, Maryse threw Miz a celebration party which consisted of champagne, a bear mascot, and a huge red gift. Miz attacked the mascot because he thought it was Ambrose. Miz also thought that Ambrose was hiding in the gift and he knocked it over and proceeded to destroy it. Maryse said that it was a grandfather clock that he had always wanted, which caused Maryse to run to the back upset. Miz apologized to Maryse for destroying the clock and for accidentally knocking her off the apron the previous week. Maryse accepted the apology, but after Ambrose interrupted, the clock was accidentally broken again by Miz, and Maryse left the ring in tears. Following this, Ambrose was attacked by two men dressed in bear costumes who were revealed to be Curtis Axel and Bo Dallas, who Miz had earlier invited to be part of his entourage. The following week on Raw, Ambrose teamed with Heath Slater and Rhyno in a losing effort against The Miz and his Miztourage (Axel and Dallas). The following week, Miz retained his title in a match against Slater. Ambrose was then granted his rematch for the Intercontinental Championship at Great Balls of Fire.

At Extreme Rules, Cesaro and Sheamus defeated The Hardy Boyz (Jeff Hardy and Matt Hardy) in a Steel Cage match to win the Raw Tag Team Championship. The Hardy Boyz invoked their championship rematch for the June 12 episode of Raw in a two out of three falls match, which ended in a no contest after the deciding fall ended in a double-countout. On the June 26 episode, The Hardy Boyz teamed with Finn Bálor and defeated the team of Cesaro, Sheamus, and Elias Samson. On the July 3 episode, General Manager Kurt Angle announced that The Hardy Boyz would face Cesaro and Sheamus in one final match for the titles in a 30-Minute Iron Man match at Great Balls of Fire.

== Event ==
Other on-screen personnel
Role:	Name:
English commentators	Michael Cole (PPV)
English commentators	Corey Graves (PPV + pre-show)
English commentators	Booker T (PPV)
English commentators	Vic Joseph (pre-show)
Spanish commentators	Carlos Cabrera
Spanish commentators	Marcelo Rodríguez
German commentators	Carsten Schaefer
German commentators	Tim Haber
German commentators	Calvin Knie
Ring announcer	JoJo
Referees	John Cone
Referees	Darrick Moore
Referees	Chad Patton
Referees	Eddie Orengo
Referees	Rod Zapata
Interviewers	Charly Caruso
Interviewers	Mike Rome
Pre-show panel	Renee Young
Pre-show panel	Peter Rosenberg
Pre-show panel	David Otunga
Raw Talk panel	Renee Young
Raw Talk panel	Peter Rosenberg

=== Pre-show ===
During the Great Balls of Fire Kickoff pre-show, Neville defended the WWE Cruiserweight Championship against Akira Tozawa (with Titus O'Neil). In the end, Neville performed a Spinning Back Kick on Tozawa to retain the title.

=== Preliminary matches ===
The actual pay-per-view opened with Bray Wyatt facing Seth Rollins. Wyatt poked the eye of Rollins and executed Sister Abigail on Rollins to win the match.

Next, Enzo Amore faced Big Cass. After dominating the entire match, Cass performed a Big Boot on Amore for the win.

After that, Cesaro and Sheamus defended the Raw Tag Team Championship against The Hardy Boyz in a 30-minute Iron Man match. At the start of the match, after Cesaro distracted Matt, Sheamus performed a Brogue Kick on Matt to make the score 1–0. Sheamus and Cesaro performed a White Noise/Diving Neckbreaker combination on Jeff to advance the score to 2–0. Jeff performed a Twist of Fate on Cesaro to make the score 2–1. After Cesaro threw Matt into the ring post, causing him to bleed, Matt was counted out, making the score 3–1. With the aid of Matt, Jeff pinned Cesaro with a split-legged pin to make the score 3–2. Matt performed a Super Twist of Fate on Sheamus to even the score 3–3. Thinking Sheamus was the legal man, Jeff performed a Swanton Bomb on him, but was quickly pinned by Cesaro, who was the legal man, to make the score 4–3. Jeff performed a Twist of Fate on Cesaro, but during the pin, the time-limit expired, meaning Cesaro and Sheamus retained the titles.

Later, Alexa Bliss defended the Raw Women's Championship against Sasha Banks. Banks applied the Bank Statement but Bliss touched the ring rope. Bliss was then counted out, meaning Banks won the match, but Bliss retained the title. After the match, Banks fought with Bliss on the stage and performed a Meteora on Bliss off the English announce table.

Next, The Miz (with his Miztourage: Curtis Axel, Bo Dallas, and Maryse) defended the Intercontinental Championship against Dean Ambrose. Ambrose executed Dirty Deeds on Miz, only for Maryse to place Miz's foot on the rope at a two count. In the end, Axel distracted the referee, allowing Dallas to attack Ambrose. Miz then performed a Skull Crushing Finale on Ambrose to retain the title.

After that, Roman Reigns faced Braun Strowman in an ambulance match. In the climax on the stage, Strowman attempted to throw Reigns into the LED light board but Reigns pushed Strowman into it, destroying a section of the LED light board. As Reigns then attempted a spear on Strowman, Strowman avoided it and Reigns fell into the ambulance. Strowman then quickly closed the doors to win the match. After the match, Reigns left the ambulance, performed a spear on Strowman, and threw him into the ambulance. Reigns then drove the ambulance into the parking garage, reversed the ambulance, and crashed it into a production truck, trapping Strowman inside. Reigns then left as General Manager Kurt Angle appeared in shock.

Whilst backstage personnel and emergency services attended to Strowman, Heath Slater defeated Curt Hawkins in an impromptu match off-screen. After Strowman was freed from the ambulance with the jaws of life, he refused medical treatment and stumbled away.

=== Main event ===
In the main event, Brock Lesnar (accompanied by Paul Heyman) defended the Universal Championship against Samoa Joe. Before the match, Joe attacked Lesnar and performed a Uranage Slam on Lesnar through an announce table. After Lesnar recovered, the match officially started and Joe applied the Coquina Clutch on Lesnar, who escaped and performed three German Suplexes on Joe. Whilst the referee was distracted, Joe attacked Lesnar with a low blow and applied a second Coquina Clutch on Lesnar, who countered into a Sidewalk Slam. Lesnar attempted an F-5 on Joe, who countered into the Coquina Clutch for the third time. However, Lesnar escaped and performed an F-5 on Joe to retain the title.

== Reception ==
Though the name of the event received massive criticism on social media, the card and presentation were well-received, with the event being considered one of the better WWE pay-per-views of 2017.

== Aftermath ==
Roman Reigns' post-match attack on Braun Strowman was widely described as attempted murder. The following day, it was reported that Strowman was in the care of his personal physician, but the severity of his injuries were undisclosed.

On the post-Great Balls of Fire episode of Raw, General Manager Kurt Angle congratulated Brock Lesnar on retaining the Universal Championship. As Angle was about to reveal his plans for Lesnar's championship match at SummerSlam, they were interrupted by Roman Reigns. Reigns said that he took care of Braun Strowman, since Angle could not and Lesnar was never around to be able to. Reigns then said he wanted Lesnar at SummerSlam, but Lesnar said he did not deserve it. They were then interrupted by Samoa Joe. He claimed that Lesnar did not beat him, but escaped him at Great Balls of Fire. Angle then scheduled Reigns to face Joe the following week where the winner would face Lesnar for the title at SummerSlam, however, the match ended in a no-contest after Strowman returned and attacked both, and Angle scheduled a fatal four-way for the Universal Championship at SummerSlam.

The Hardy Boyz addressed the Iron Man match. They said that due to their loss, other tag teams on Raw thought that they were done, but they said that they were not. They were then interrupted by Luke Gallows and Karl Anderson, who defeated The Hardys in an ensuing tag match. After that match, The Revival came out and also attacked The Hardy Boyz.

The Miz hosted his own award show, The Mizzies, in response to retaining the Intercontinental Championship against Dean Ambrose. Curtis Axel and Bo Dallas tied for "Best Supporting Actor", Maryse won "Most Gorgeous Sexy Leading Lady", and The Miz won "Greatest Man in WWE". Ambrose then came out and immediately attacked Miz, but Axel and Dallas made the save. As Ambrose was getting beat down, Seth Rollins came out to help Ambrose, and the two cleared the ring. Later that night, Rollins faced Bray Wyatt in a rematch that Wyatt won. After the match, The Miztourage came out and attacked Rollins, who was saved by Ambrose.

In the women's division, Sasha Banks and Bayley teamed up to face Nia Jax and Raw Women's Champion Alexa Bliss in a rematch from the previous week. Bayley rolled up Bliss for the win. Bayley defeated Bliss the following week in a singles match, and then defeated Banks to become the number one contender for the title at SummerSlam. However, Bayley suffered an injury during a match against Jax on the July 31 episode, removing her from the title match. On the August 7 episode, Banks and Jax won their respective triple threat matches, and Banks defeated Jax to earn a rematch against Bliss for the Raw Women's Championship at SummerSlam.

In the cruiserweight division, Akira Tozawa and Cedric Alexander teamed up and faced Noam Dar and WWE Cruiserweight Champion Neville where Tozawa pinned Neville to win the match. The following night on 205 Live, Neville attacked Tozawa during Tozawa's match against Ariya Daivari.

Big Cass gloated about defeating Enzo Amore. He said that he was the future of WWE and will eventually become Universal Champion. He was then interrupted by Big Show, who attacked Cass and threw Cass out of the ring. Cass and Enzo had a rematch on the July 24 episode that was again won by Cass. After the match, Cass attacked Enzo further, but was saved by Big Show. However, Cass also took out Show.

This would be WWE's only Great Balls of Fire event, as although a follow up was not on WWE's originally planned 2018 schedule, brand-exclusive PPV and livestreaming events for the main roster were discontinued following WrestleMania 34 in April that year, reducing the amount of these events produced per year. While the date for Great Balls of Fire had originally been intended to reinstate Bad Blood, the company would later reinstate Bad Blood for October 2024, 20 years after the last Bad Blood event in 2004.

== Results ==
No.	Results	Stipulations	Times
1^{P}	Neville (c) defeated Akira Tozawa (with Titus O'Neil) by pinfall	Singles match for the WWE Cruiserweight Championship	11:40
2	Bray Wyatt defeated Seth Rollins by pinfall	Singles match	12:10
3	Big Cass defeated Enzo Amore by pinfall	Singles match	5:25
4	Cesaro and Sheamus (c) defeated The Hardy Boyz (Matt and Jeff) 4–3	30-minute Iron Man match for the WWE Raw Tag Team Championship	30:00
5	Sasha Banks defeated Alexa Bliss (c) by countout	Singles match for the WWE Raw Women's Championship	11:40
6	The Miz (c) (with Bo Dallas, Curtis Axel and Maryse) defeated Dean Ambrose by pinfall	Singles match for the WWE Intercontinental Championship	11:20
7	Braun Strowman defeated Roman Reigns	Ambulance match	16:35
8	Heath Slater defeated Curt Hawkins by pinfall	Singles match	2:10
9	Brock Lesnar (c) (with Paul Heyman) defeated Samoa Joe by pinfall	Singles match for the WWE Universal Championship	6:25
(c) / – the champion(s) heading into the match; P / – the match was broadcast on the pre-show

=== Iron Man match ===
Score		Point winner	Decision	Notes	Time
Cesaro and Sheamus	The Hardy Boyz	Point winner	Decision	Notes	Time
1	0	Cesaro and Sheamus	Pinfall	Sheamus pinned Matt after the Brogue Kick	0:20
2	0	Cesaro and Sheamus	Pinfall	Sheamus pinned Jeff after he and Cesaro performed a White Noise / diving neckbreaker combination	9:48
2	1	The Hardy Boyz	Pinfall	Jeff pinned Cesaro after the Twist of Fate	12:54
3	1	Cesaro and Sheamus	Countout	Matt was counted out after Cesaro threw him against a ring post	16:45
3	2	The Hardy Boyz	Pinfall	Jeff pinned Cesaro with a cradle	22:57
3	3	The Hardy Boyz	Pinfall	Matt pinned Sheamus after an elevated Twist of Fate	27:05
4	3	Cesaro and Sheamus	Pinfall	Cesaro pinned Jeff with a lateral press after Jeff performed the Swanton Bomb on Sheamus	29:32
