= Sylvain Grenier =

Canadian professional wrestler (born 1977)

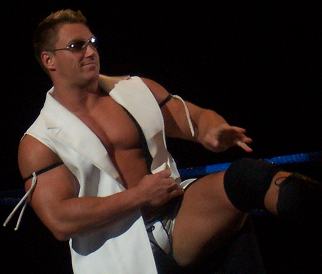
- Grenier in 2005

Personal information
- Born: March 26, 1977 (age 49) Varennes, Quebec, Canada

Professional wrestling career
- Ring name(s): M. Canada; Sly; Sylvain; Sylvan; Sylvain Grenier
- Billed height: 6 ft 0 in (1.83 m)
- Billed weight: 250 lb (113 kg)
- Billed from: Montreal, Quebec, Canada
- Trained by: Dory Funk Jr. Rocky Johnson
- Debut: 1998

Sylvain Grenier (born March 26, 1977) is a Canadian semi-retired professional wrestler. He is best known for his tenure in World Wrestling Entertainment (WWE).

He is best known for his time wrestling for WWE between 2002 and 2007 where he was part of La Résistance and became a four-time World Tag Team Champion (once with René Duprée and three times with Rob Conway). After his release from WWE, Grenier became a French-language commentator for Total Nonstop Action Wrestling (TNA) Impact! for a number of years and continued to wrestle on the Quebec independent circuit.

== Early life ==
As a child, Grenier lived with his parents in Varennes, Quebec. Grenier played baseball, tennis and hockey at an amateur level. Grenier worked as a model.

== Professional wrestling career ==
Grenier made his professional wrestling debut in 1998.

=== World Wrestling Entertainment (2001-2007) ===
==== Early appearances (2001–2003) ====
Grenier auditioned for series one and two of Tough Enough, the reality television program produced by World Wrestling Entertainment in 2001 and 2002, but was unable to attend the selection process due to visa problems. While he was in Florida training and taking part in a modeling shoot, Grenier met WWE producer Pat Patterson, with whom he became good friends. Patterson invited Grenier to attend WWE events for a few tryout matches under the ring name "Sly Grenier". Following a match, Grenier was offered a contract by WWE, and assigned to WWE developmental territory Ohio Valley Wrestling.

During this period, Grenier made two appearances for WWE, the first at No Way Out in 2003 as a referee during the match between The Rock and Hulk Hogan in which he helped The Rock to win that match; the other at WrestleMania XIX during the match between Hogan and Vince McMahon.

==== La Résistance (2003–2005) ====
On April 28, Grenier returned to WWE, debuting on the Raw brand alongside fellow French Canadian René Duprée. The duo were collectively known as La Résistance, and were billed as Frenchmen who were highly critical of American efforts in the war on terror. Grenier and Duprée made their first appearance on the April 28 episode of Raw as La Résistance by attacking Scott Steiner who had recently made remarks comparing France to hell, offending Grenier and Duprée. La Résistance went on to feud with Scott Steiner and Test (who was being forced to be Steiner's tag team partner by Stacy Keibler) until the Judgment Day pay-per-view on May 18 where La Résistance defeated Steiner and Test.

Grenier and Duprée went on to win the World Tag Team Championship from Kane and Rob Van Dam at Bad Blood on June 15. After that the decision was made to add Rob Conway as a third member who began by posing as an American serviceman being abused by Grenier and Duprée until the Dudley Boyz came out to save him. Once the Dudley Boyz had their backs turned to Conway, he attacked them with the American flag they had given him before tearing it off the pole and laying it on top of them. The trio began carrying the French flag to ringside and singing the French national anthem before their matches. During their time together the trio feuded with several tag teams; including the Dudley Boyz, The Hurricane and Rosey, and Garrison Cade and Mark Jindrak.

They held the titles until Unforgiven on September 21 when they dropped them to The Dudley Boyz in a three-on-two handicap tables match. During the match, Grenier suffered neck and back injuries, and was diagnosed with a broken neck a month later. The trio eventually reunited on the edition of March 15, 2004, of Raw. when Grenier returned. This reunion only lasted a week, as Dupree was drafted to SmackDown! on March 22, 2004, during the Draft Lottery.

Without Dupree, Grenier and Conway continued to team together as La Résistance on Raw. With American-Franco hostility subsiding, WWE ceased billing the team as being from France and instead promoted them as being haughty French Canadians who carried the flag of Quebec to the ring, with Grenier often singing the Canadian national anthem. Grenier has later said that he preferred teaming with Conway over Duprée, stating "Rob made me love wrestling again".

The team held the World Tag Team Championship three times. Their first title reign began when they defeated Chris Benoit and Edge on the May 31, 2004, episode of Raw in Grenier's home town of Montreal. They dropped the championship to them at Taboo Tuesday on October 19 when Benoit was able to defeat both Grenier and Conway, despite Edge abandoning Benoit during the match. La Résistance re-captured the championship on the November 1 episode of Raw when Edge walked out on Benoit again. Two weeks later, however, in a three-way tag team elimination match, William Regal and Eugene were the last men standing, beating both La Résistance and the team of Tajiri and Rhyno. Their final Tag Team Championship win occurred at a Raw house show in Winnipeg, Manitoba, Canada on January 16, 2005. La Résistance defeated William Regal and Jonathan Coachman (who substituted for Eugene due to suffering an injury). La Résistance dropped the championship a few weeks later on the February 7, 2005, episode of Raw in Tokyo, Japan to William Regal and his new tag team partner Tajiri. on the March 14 episode of Raw, La Résistance were defeated by The Rockers (Shawn Michaels and Marty Jannetty) in a Rockers Reunion.

La Résistance repeatedly attempted to regain the title, mainly on Sunday Night Heat, but fell short during each one. La Résistance were given another chance at Regal and Tajiri during a Tag Team Turmoil match involving five teams during Backlash on May 1. In the match, La Résistance managed to eliminate the current champions but were defeated by the last remaining team, Hurricane and Rosey.

The team split in mid-May 2005 after repeatedly quarreling over which of them was the superior wrestler. Grenier and Conway went into singles competition with announcers claiming that the members of La Résistance were trying to "one up" each other in singles matches without the other man in their corner. This saw Conway defeat a jobber and Val Venis, while Grenier was defeated by both Val Venis and Chris Jericho before both men competed in a triple threat match (with Intercontinental Champion Shelton Benjamin for the title), Benjamin won the match after the La Résistance members began to argue and fight with each other. The altercation between the two led to a main event match for the edition of June 12, 2005, of Sunday Night Heat. This match saw Conway portray the heel, and defeat Grenier.

==== Singles competition (2005–2006) ====
Grenier was a last minute trade in the 2005 WWE Draft, forcing him to leave Raw and go to SmackDown! ending his already shakey tag team partnership with Conway. After being traded he was not seen on television for a few months, eventually re-debuting on SmackDown! on September 1, 2005. He was repackaged with a gimmick of a narcissistic male supermodel known simply as "Sylvain", though his name was later tweaked to "Sylvan", the same spelling that was used in the original La Resistance vignettes. His new gimmick saw him speak with a light French accent, wear sunglasses and use techno music for his entrance.

Sylvan soon began a brief feud with Hardcore Holly, which saw Sylvan determined to protect his "perfect face" at any cost. Sylvan gained a victory over Holly on the October 7 episode of SmackDown! with help from Mr. Kennedy. At No Mercy 2005 after Kennedy defeated Holly, Sylvan came out and continued his feud with him by attacking the injured Holly, which led to Sylvan losing a singles match on an episode of Velocity and a hardcore match the following week on SmackDown!, ending an almost two-month feud. Sylvan entered the 2006 Royal Rumble, but was quickly eliminated by Bobby Lashley. After this, Sylvan slowly reverted to using anti-American tactics while still retaining his model gimmick. However, this change was short-lived and he was soon taken off of television, where he began wrestling in dark matches before SmackDown! tapings and in OVW.

On the June 16, 2006, episode of SmackDown! vignettes designed to look like vacation promotion videos for Quebec and starring Sylvan ("the Ambassador at Large for the Beautiful Province of Québec", or "the Ambassador of Québec" for short) began airing. On July 7 he appeared in-ring to cut a promo attempting to "make peace" with the US fans by welcoming them to visit his home province. The fans responded with a chorus of boos and a loud "USA" chant. In the coming weeks he continued to appear backstage, telling everyone within earshot how much better Québec was than where ever they were from. He made his ring return with this gimmick on the July 28 SmackDown! with a win over Tatanka. Sylvan would go on to job against the likes of Tatanka, Vito, and Batista under this gimmick. Sylvan's losing streak ended on the first CW Network episode of SmackDown! on September 22, 2006, when he defeated Tatanka again by using the ring ropes for illegal leverage. The following week on SmackDown!, Sylvan defeated Jimmy Wang Yang, who had insulted Canada the week before. The next week, Sylvan cheated again to take a lead in the feud. The following week, Sylvan finally lost to Yang in a six-man tag team match. After disappearing for a couple of weeks, Sylvan finally returned to cost Yang a match versus Gregory Helms. After that match, Matt Hardy came out to help Yang ward off Helms and Sylvan. The following week, Hardy and Yang defeated Helms and Sylvan, ending Sylvan's feud with Yang.

==== La Résistance reunion (2006–2007) ====
Sylvan returned to OVW on November 15, making a surprise appearance as Sylvain Grenier, teaming with Rob Conway to reform their La Résistance. The reformed team defeated Cody Runnels and Shawn Spears to earn a shot at the OVW Southern Tag Team Championship, but were unsuccessful in the title match. On the December 22 episode of SmackDown!, he disguised himself as Santa Claus and attacked World Heavyweight Champion Batista with a steel pipe. This resulted in a match with Batista that Sylvan quickly lost and would end the "Ambassador of Québec" gimmick as Sylvan disappeared from television after this.

On the February 20, 2007, episode of ECW, Grenier returned and reformed the original La Résistance with René Duprée, defeating a pair of local wrestlers. Due to Duprée getting suspended at the start of March, however, and being sent to rehab after violating the Health and Wellness policy, the team was quietly disbanded. At the August 7, 2007, taping of SmackDown!, Sylvan made his televised return under his old model gimmick in a match against Kane, which he lost. This would turn out to be Grenier's final match for WWE, as he was released from his contract on August 13.

=== Total Nonstop Action Wrestling (2007–2009) ===
On November 29, 2007, Grenier debuted as a French language commentator for Total Nonstop Action Wrestling's (TNA) Impact! television show on Réseau des sports (RDS). During his time with TNA, he embarked on a feud with former commentator Pierre Carl Ouellet, with Grenier claiming that he was the better commentator. They settled their feud in a match in Hawkesbury, Ontario, on June 21, 2008, in which Ouellet was victorious. Greiner was released in 2009.

=== Independent circuit (2008–2018; 2018–2019) ===
Grenier returned to the independent circuit in January 2008 at International Wrestling Syndicate's Praise The Violence where he lost to Kevin Steen in an IWS Heavyweight Championship number one contendership match. On August 30, 2008, Grenier reunited with Rob Conway to reform La Résistance, and they defeated Karl Briscoe and Jay Phenomenon to win Northern Championship Wrestling's Tag Team Championship. before losing them to Kid Rock and Gorgeous Mike on October 25. On December 20, at NCW's Noël D'Enfer event, Grenier defeated Samson to win the Quebec Championship. He would hold the title for over 50 days before losing it to Nova Cain on February 7, 2009. On April 17, 2009, he appeared for Ring of Honor, competing in a six-man tag match, in which he teamed with The American Wolves (Davey Richards and Eddie Edwards) in a loss to Bryan Danielson, Kevin Steen and El Generico. On November 22, 2009, Grenier defeated Darkko to win the Combat Revolution Wrestling (CRW) Quebec Championship. He lost the championship to Darkko on February 21, 2010.

On March 5, 2010, Grenier debuted as a new gimmick, known as Iceman at his TOW Wrestling show. In a match at a CRW show, he defeated the highflying Van Hawk, a mainstay in the independent circuit of Quebec. Later that night, in his usual persona, Grenier recaptured the CRW Quebec Championship by defeating Darkko and Dru Onyx in a casket match at a TOW show, before losing it to Darkko two days later. In November 2011, Greiner toured several European countries as part of American Wrestling Rampage, where he predominantly teamed with former La Résistance partner René Duprée.

On November 1, 2012, Grenier decided he will be taking a break from wrestling for a while. On November 13, 2012, Grenier came to the rescue of Alex Shelley on a PPV event. Grenier made an announcement on November 1, 2012, that he will have a few matches. Grenier faced Juice Robinson, Jay White on November 16, 2012, in a handicap match. On November 18, 2012, Grenier had a match against Kushida but lost to Kushida by distraction of Kyosuke Mikami, Katsuyori Shibata, Cliff Compton coming to the ring. Grenier became the World Lutte TOW Wrestling Champion for 389 days, but lost it to Thomas Dubois.

On January 19, 2018, Grenier announced his retirement via Twitter, but ended his retirement on October 27, 2018, returning to the ring for La Lutte C Vrai against Franky the Mobster. Grenier continued to compete on the Quebec independent wrestling circuit before returning to WWE. He stopped wrestling when he joined WWE.

=== Return to WWE (2020) ===
On January 19, 2020, it was announced that Grenier had returned to WWE as a backstage producer. He was fired during the year, along with many other wrestlers and producers as a cost-cutting measure due to COVID-19.

=== Return to independent circuit (2022–present) ===
Sylvain along with Rob Conway were recently FWE Tag Team Champions. FWE is based in Raleigh NC.

He held the FWE Heavyweight Championship until March 2025.

== Personal life ==
Since his departure from WWE, Grenier has ventured in the media industry as a TV host and executive producer on several TV shows for Sports Network in Canada. He currently resides in between the suburbs of Montreal and Florida with his wife and two kids.

As an entrepreneur, Grenier has succeeded in the sports nutrition business as well as the real estate industry.

== Other media ==
Grenier appears as a playable character in WWE SmackDown! vs. Raw 2006.

== Championships and accomplishments ==
- Canadian Wrestling Federation
  - CWF Tag Team Championship (1 time, current) – with René Duprée
- Fortitude Wrestling Entertainment
  - FWE Heavyweight Championship (1 time)
  - FWE Tag Team Championship (1 time) – with Rob Conway
- Combat Revolution Wrestling
  - CRW Quebec Championship (2 times)
- Northern Championship Wrestling
  - NCW Quebec Championship (1 time)
  - NCW Tag Team Championship (1 time) – with Rob Conway
- Top Of The World Wrestling
  - TOW Championship (1 time)
  - TOW Tag Team Championship (1 time) – with Rob Conway
- World Wrestling Entertainment
  - World Tag Team Championship (4 times) – with René Duprée (1) and Rob Conway (3)
- Wrestling Observer Newsletter
  - Worst Tag Team (2003) with René Duprée
