= La Résistance (professional wrestling) =

Professional wrestling tag team

Stable
- Members: Sylvan/Sylvain Grenier; René Duprée; Robért Conway
- Name(s): La Résistance; The Resistance
- Billed heights: Sylvian Grenier 6 ft 0 in (183 cm); Rob Conway 6ft 2in (188 cm); René Duprée 6ft 3in (191 cm)
- Combined billed weight: 507 lbs (230 kg)
- Billed from: Paris, France; The Province of Quebec
- Debut: 2003
- Disbanded: 2020
- Years active: 2003–2007; 2008–2009; 2016–2020; 2023–2024

La Résistance was a professional wrestling tag team and former stable who performed for World Wrestling Entertainment. The name of the team is a reference to the French Resistance.

== History ==
=== World Wrestling Entertainment ===
==== Debut ====
The stable was created when WWE aired vignettes of two arrogant "Frenchmen" (Sylvain Grenier and René Duprée, who are both actually French Canadians) attacking the United States and its policy from a French news studio. The gimmick was inspired by the then-rise in American anti-French sentiment, due to the country's opposition to the Iraq War.

Grenier and Duprée made their first appearance on the April 28, 2003, edition of Raw as La Résistance by attacking then-babyface, Scott Steiner. Steiner had made remarks two weeks earlier comparing France to hell and Grenier and Duprée were offended. La Résistance went on to feud with Scott Steiner and Test who was forced to be Steiner's tag team partner by Stacy Keibler, La Résistance ended up defeating Steiner and Test at Judgment Day on May 18, 2003, in the team's pay-per-view debut. Their most notorious insult to the United States came on Memorial Day in 2003 when they interrupted Raw announcer Lilian Garcia as she was singing America the Beautiful. After several minutes of Grenier calling America barbarians and saying that France would not allow the US to be the police force of the world, Steve Austin interrupted them and cleared the ring, responding with unflattering remarks about the French nation.

On the May 26, 2003, edition of Raw, Grenier defeated Rob Van Dam in a Flag match to win a World Tag Team Championship shot. Grenier and Duprée went on to win the World Tag Team Championship from Kane and Rob Van Dam at Bad Blood.

==== Addition of Robert Conway ====
In mid-2003 the team added a third member, Rob Conway, who posed as an American serviceman being abused by Grenier and Duprée. When The Dudley Boyz came out to attack La Résistance they brought Conway in the ring with an American flag. Once the Dudley Boyz had their backs turned to Conway, he attacked them with the American flag and then tore it off the pole and laid it on top of them.

La Resistance lost the titles at Unforgiven 2003 in a three on two handicapped tables match to the Dudley Boyz. The trio went on to feud with several other tag teams, including Hurricane and Rosey, and the team of Garrison Cade and Mark Jindrak before Grenier suffered a back injury in October 2003. Duprée and Conway would hold the team together until Grenier's return on the March 15, 2004, edition of Raw, but the stable was broken up the very next week when Duprée was drafted in a lottery by WWE's other brand, SmackDown.

At WrestleMania XX, La Résistance competed in a Fatal 4-Way match for the World Tag Team Championship where Booker T and Rob Van Dam retained the titles.

==== Conway and Grenier ====
While Duprée was drafted to the SmackDown! brand and established his French Phenom persona, Conway and Grenier were left to keep La Résistance together as a unit. (neither Duprée nor the La Résistance tag team changed their entrance music.) Conway began being billed as Robért Conway (pronounce Robe-air), and he and Grenier began being announced as hailing from Quebec City (later changed to simply the Province of Quebec) instead of France and wore new ring attire with the blue and white colours of Quebec along with the traditional fleur-de-lis. Several months after the loss of Duprée, La Résistance went on to defeat Edge and Chris Benoit for the World Tag Team Championship in Grenier's home town of Montreal, Quebec, to a standing ovation.

With the help of Raw General manager Eric Bischoff, La Résistance managed to keep hold of the titles for five months, but at the first interactive PPV Taboo Tuesday they had to defend their titles against the two Superstars who were not voted for by the fans to get a World Heavyweight Championship shot at Triple H. This stipulation meant they would either face the team of Edge and Benoit, Edge and Shawn Michaels, or Benoit and Michaels.

During Taboo Tuesday, the announcement was made that Shawn Michaels had been voted for a title shot with 38.72% of the vote compared to Edge's 33.42% and Benoit's 27.86%; this meant La Résistance would meet Edge and Benoit in a rematch of their championship victory five months earlier. They would lose the titles to Edge and Benoit, even though Edge left the arena half-way through the match leaving Benoit to win the match on his own. As Grenier and Conway invoked their rematch clause thirteen days later on Raw, the dissension between Benoit and Edge would continue and finally be their undoing as La Résistance won the titles back. Soon after, on the November 15, 2004, edition of Raw, La Résistance lost the World Tag Team Championship again, this time to Eugene and William Regal.

Grenier and Conway managed to win the World Tag Team Championship for the third time together and fourth since the creation of the stable. This championship win was a rare one since it was won at a Raw-brand house show on January 16, 2005, in Winnipeg, Manitoba. This time, La Résistance defeated Regal and Jonathan Coachman, who was taking the place of the legitimately injured Eugene (who would miss several months due to a left patella tear at New Year's Revolution). Grenier and Conway soon lost the belts back to Regal and his tag team partner Tajiri, on an episode of Raw taking place from Tajiri's hometown of Tokyo.

La Résistance repeatedly attempted to regain the gold (mainly on Sunday Night Heat) from Regal and Tajiri in many different matches but just fell short during each one. During their "last shot" for the gold the team thought they had won back the titles only to have the decision reversed by referee Mike Chioda due to La Résistance's Grenier pinning Tajiri, not Regal, who was the legal man. La Résistance went on to lose the match.

On the March 14 episode of Raw, La Résistance were defeated by The Rockers (Shawn Michaels and Marty Jannetty) in a Rockers's Reunion. At WrestleMania 21, La Résistance competed in a 30-man Battle Royal which was won by Booker T.

While this was to be their last chance to win back the gold from Regal and Tajiri, the team were given one more chance during a Tag Team Turmoil match during Backlash. In the match, La Résistance managed to eliminate the champions but were still unable to win the match and regain the titles as they were defeated by the winners of the match, Rosey and The Hurricane. The next night on Raw, La Résistance tried again to win the titles in a match against the new champions but were unsuccessful again. They would feud with Hurricane and Rosey, having various filler matches on multiple pay-per-view events.

==== Disbanding ====
Grenier and Conway went into singles competition with announcers claiming that the members of La Résistance were trying to "one up" each other in singles matches without the other man in their corner. This saw Conway defeat a jobber and Val Venis, while Grenier was defeated by both Val Venis and Chris Jericho before both men competed in a triple threat match (against Intercontinental Champion Shelton Benjamin for the title), Benjamin won the match, not long after the La Résistance members began to argue and fight. This altercation between the two led to a taped main event match on June 6, 2005, for the June 12 episode of Sunday Night Heat. This match saw Rob Conway portray the heel character, and defeat Sylvain Grenier.

On June 30, 2005, Grenier and Dupree were last minute trades in the 2005 WWE Draft, which saw Grenier leave Raw to go to SmackDown! and Dupree come back to Raw.

==== Reformations ====
On April 3, 2006, Rene Duprée and Rob Conway teamed together in a dark match before Raw, in a losing effort against The Highlanders

While in WWE Developmental Territory, Ohio Valley Wrestling, Conway and Grenier briefly reteamed as La Résistance in a match on November 15, 2006, to earn an OVW Southern Tag Team Championship match by defeating the reigning champions, Cody Runnels and Shawn Spears. However the team would not win the title match.

On February 20, 2007, as La Résistance Dupree and Grenier made their return as a tag team on the ECW brand defeating Los Luchas, but on March 1, 2007, Dupree was suspended due to a violation of the Health and Wellness policy. This left Grenier and Conway to team together again in OVW and dark matches for the next couple months until May 11, 2007, when Conway was released from WWE.

On July 26, 2007, Duprée was also released from his WWE contract. On August 13, 2007, Grenier was released from his WWE contract officially ending the WWE careers of all three La Résistance members.

=== Independent circuit (2008–2009, 2016–2017, 2019, 2023-2024) ===
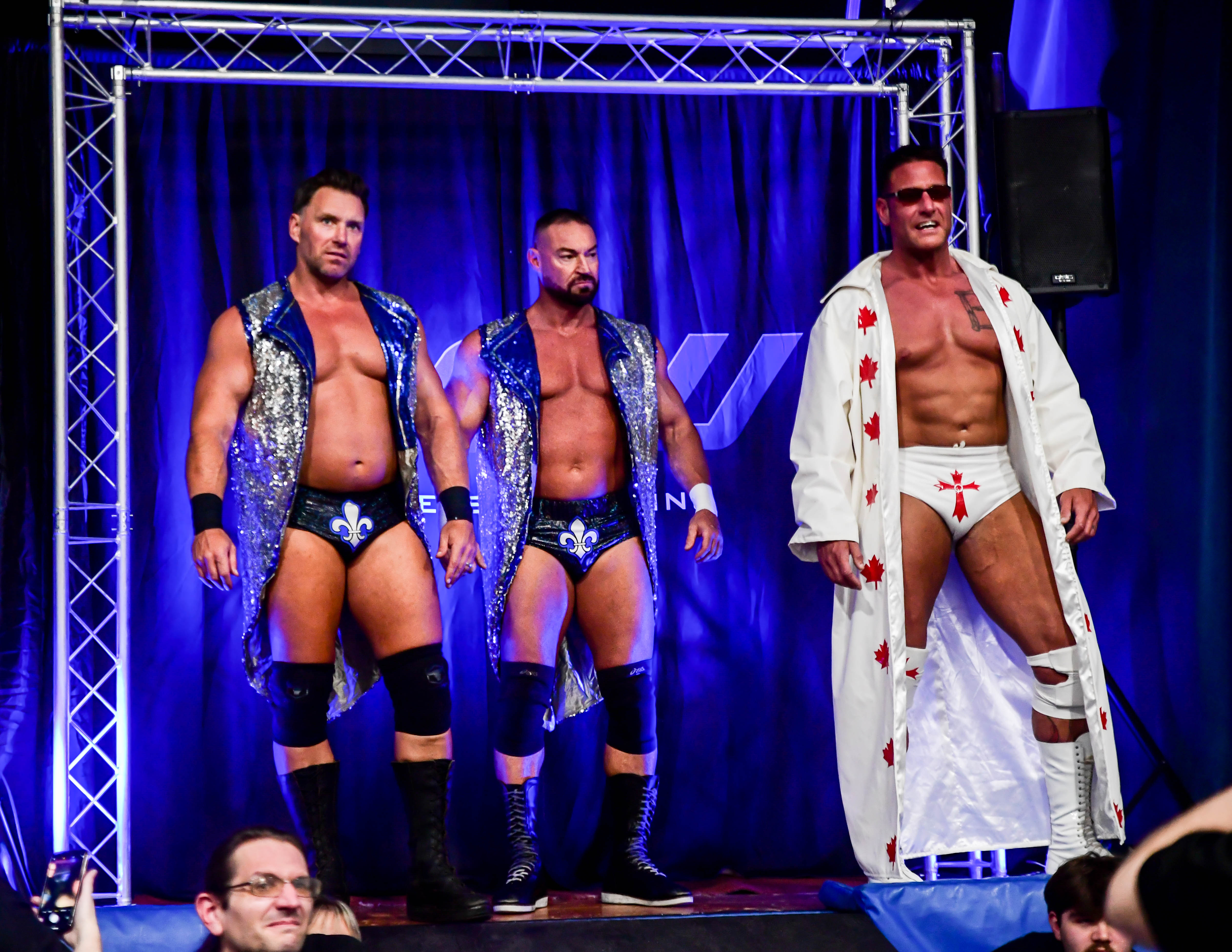
La Résistance reuniting in 2024

On August 30, 2008, Grenier and Conway, as La Résistance, defeated Jay Phenomenon and Karl Briscoe to win the NCW Tag Team Championships.

On March 21, 2009, Grenier and Conway as La Résistance defeated Les Titans (Bishop and Chakal) to become the new TOW Tag Team Champions. On September 25, 2009, they lost the titles when they were defeated by Al Snow and Pierre Carl Ouellet.

On November 5, 2016, Grenier and Duprée reunited to defeat Michael Von Payton and Platinum Preston Perry at Great North Wrestling: Star Stampede in Hawkesbury, ON.

On November 6, 2016, Duprée and Grenier were part of a four corners Tag Team match for the CRW Tag Team Championships against the champions TDT (Mathieu St-Jacques and Thomas Dubois) and two other teams 3.0 (Scott Parker and Shane Matthews) and The Holy Alliance (Genesis and Paul Rosetti), TDT went on to retain the titles.

On August 12, 2017, Grenier and Duprée defeated Kryss Thorn and Scotty O'Shea to win the Canadian Wrestling Federation Tag Team Championship in Niagara Falls, Ontario.

In July 2019, they worked in Halifax's Ultimate Championship Wrestling.

In September 2023, Duprée reunited with Grenier at North Carolina's Fortitude Wrestling Entertainment. A month later they wrestled in Montreal at Les Promotions J/R L'Invasion De l'Est 13 where they defeated the Monkey Family and Le Changement.

They reunited with Conway on April 27, 2024 for Northeast Wrestling in Danbury, Connecticut where they defeated DJ Powers, Randy Shawn and TKO Kocenko. In August 2024, they defeated Tom Mitchell and Trace Parker at 3LW Red Rose Rumble 2 in Lancaster, Pennsylvania. In December 2024, they dropped the Fortitude Wrestling Entertainment Tag Team titles to XLG (G-Moniy and Gem Stone) in Cary, North Carolina.

== Championships and accomplishments ==
- Canadian Wrestling Federation
  - CWF Tag Team Championship (1 time) – Duprée and Grenier
- Fortitude Wrestling Entertainment
  - FWE Tag Team Championship (1 time) – Conway and Grenier
- Northern Championship Wrestling
  - NCW Tag Team Championship (1 time) – Conway and Grenier
- Top of the World Wrestling
  - TOW Tag Team Championship (1 time) – Conway and Grenier
- World Wrestling Entertainment
  - World Tag Team Championship (4 times) – Duprée and Grenier (1) and Conway and Grenier (3)
- Wrestling Observer Newsletter
  - Worst Tag Team (2003) – Duprée and Grenier
