= Cyber Sunday (2008) =

World Wrestling Entertainment pay-per-view event

- Promotional poster featuring CM Punk
- Promotion: World Wrestling Entertainment
- Brand(s): Raw; SmackDown; ECW
- Date: October 26, 2008
- City: Phoenix, Arizona
- Venue: US Airways Center
- Attendance: 7,981
- Buy rate: 153,000

Pay-per-view chronology
← Previous; No Mercy	Next → Survivor Series

Taboo Tuesday/Cyber Sunday chronology
← Previous; 2007	Next → Final

The 2008 Cyber Sunday was a professional wrestling pay-per-view (PPV) event produced by World Wrestling Entertainment (WWE). It was the fifth annual and final Taboo Tuesday/Cyber Sunday and took place on October 26, 2008, at the US Airways Center in Phoenix, Arizona, held for wrestlers from the promotion's Raw, SmackDown, and ECW brand divisions. The concept was that it was an interactive pay-per-view in which fans could vote on aspects of the matches, like stipulations or participants. The voting started on October 6, 2008, through WWE's official website and ended during the broadcast.

While this was WWE's fifth interactive PPV, it was the third titled Cyber Sunday as the first two events were titled Taboo Tuesday as they were held on a Tuesday before WWE moved the event to the more traditional Sunday in 2006. The event received 153,000 pay-per-view buys, less than the previous year's event. It was also the first and only Cyber Sunday PPV broadcast in high definition. In 2009, Cyber Sunday was replaced by Bragging Rights.

Eight professional wrestling matches and one miscellaneous segment were featured on the event's card. In the main event, Batista defeated Chris Jericho to win Raw's World Heavyweight Championship which saw fans vote for "Stone Cold" Steve Austin to be the special guest referee. In SmackDown's main match, Triple H retained the WWE Championship over the fan-voted opponent, Jeff Hardy, while for ECW's main match, Evan Bourne won the fan vote to challenge Matt Hardy for the ECW Championship, which Hardy retained.

== Production ==
=== Background ===
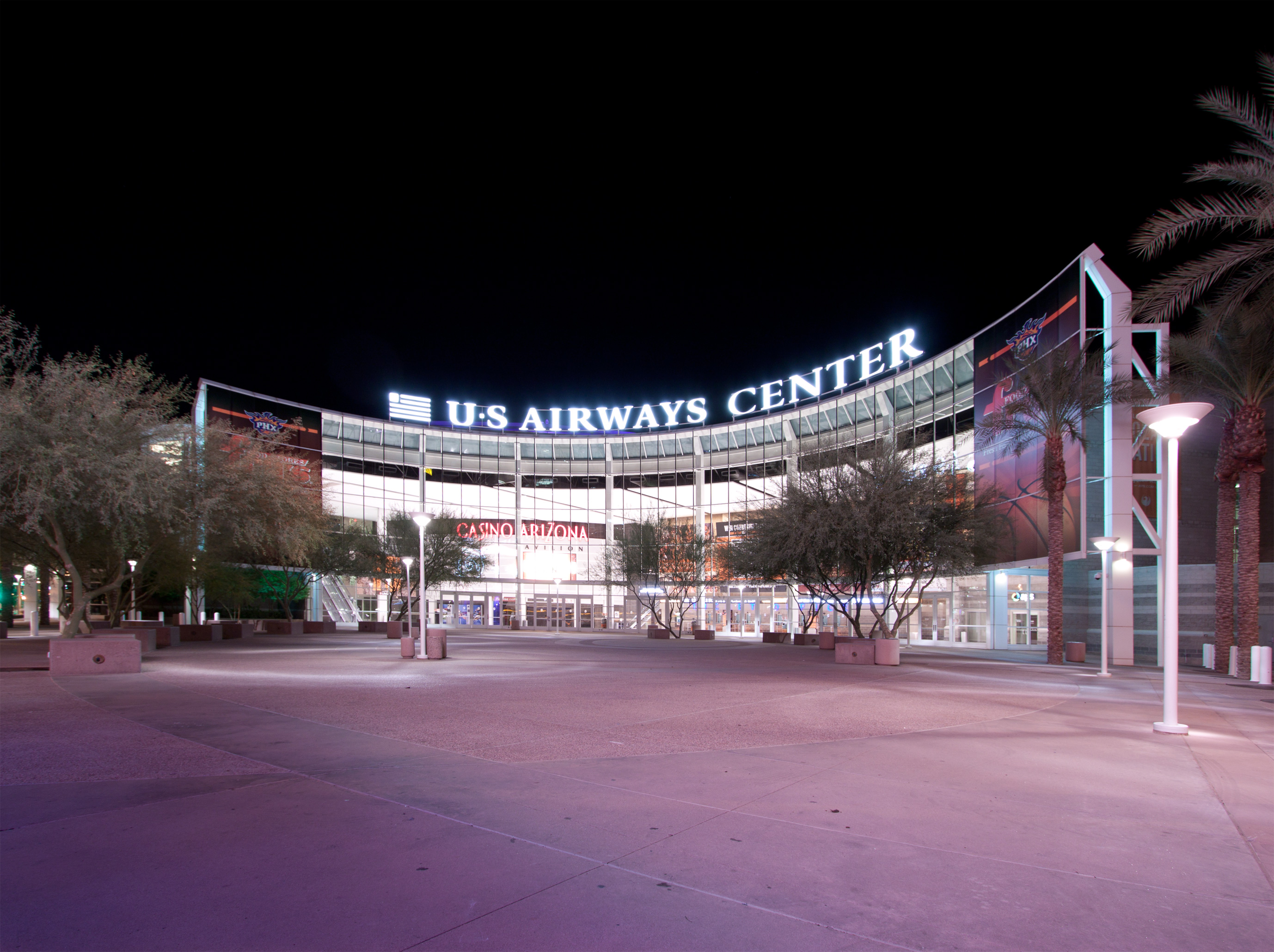
The 2008 edition of Cyber Sunday was held at the US Airways Center in Phoenix, Arizona.

Cyber Sunday, originally known as Taboo Tuesday, was an annual professional wrestling pay-per-view (PPV) event produced by World Wrestling Entertainment (WWE) since 2004. A unique feature of the event was the ability for fans to vote on certain aspects of every match. Because of this, the event was billed as an "interactive pay-per-view". The fifth event was held on October 26, 2008, at the US Airways Center in Phoenix, Arizona, and featured wrestlers from the Raw, SmackDown, and ECW brand divisions. Voting started on October 6, 2008, through WWE's official website and ended during the broadcast. Although this was the fifth event in this interactive PPV series, it was the third to be titled Cyber Sunday, as the first two events were titled Taboo Tuesday; the first two events were held on a Tuesday before WWE moved the event to the more traditional Sunday for PPVs in 2006.

=== Storylines ===
Unlike other WWE events where the stipulations were determined by WWE's creative staff, stipulations for matches were determined by votes from WWE fans conducted on WWE's website and by text messaging. The event was scheduled to feature eight professional wrestling matches and one miscellaneous segment. Although the stipulations resulted from votes by WWE fans, different wrestlers were involved in pre-existing scripted feuds, plots and storylines, which led to scheduled matches in which WWE fans could vote upon stipulations. Wrestlers were portrayed as either villains or fan favorites as they followed a series of tension-building events. All wrestlers were from either the Raw, SmackDown, or ECW brands – a storyline division in which WWE assigned its employees to a different television program.

The main feud from the Raw brand was over the World Heavyweight Championship. On the October 6 episode of Raw, general manager Mike Adamle announced that World Heavyweight Champion Chris Jericho would defend his title against Batista in a standard wrestling match, also known as a singles match, in which a guest referee would be voted for by WWE fans; the candidates for the position were Randy Orton, Shawn Michaels, and "Stone Cold" Steve Austin. Earlier that night, it was also announced that Santino Marella would defend his WWE Intercontinental Championship against a former Intercontinental Champion voted for by WWE fans; the candidates were Roddy Piper, Goldust, or The Honky Tonk Man.

The main rivalry from the SmackDown brand was over the WWE Championship. It was announced on the October 10, 2008, episode of SmackDown that WWE Champion Triple H would defend his title against either Jeff Hardy or Vladimir Kozlov in a singles match, or in a triple threat match, a standard match involving both Hardy and Kozlov. Later that night it was also announced that Big Show would face The Undertaker in a fans choice of match, which included a Knockout match, "I Quit" match, or a Last Man Standing match.

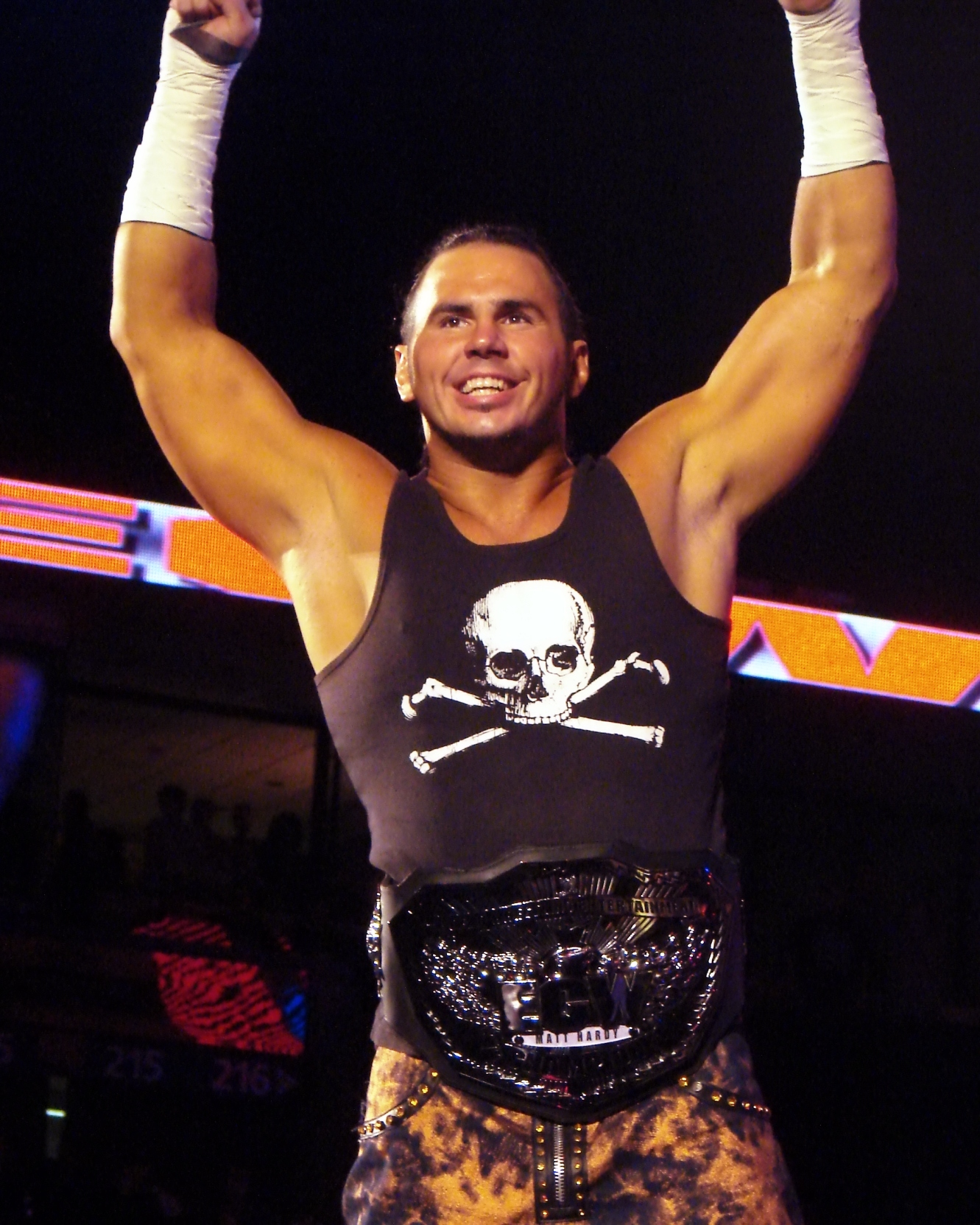
Matt Hardy as ECW Champion.

The only rivalry from the ECW brand was over the ECW Championship. It was announced on the October 14 of ECW that ECW Champion Matt Hardy would defend the title against the fans' choice of an opponent, with Mark Henry, Evan Bourne, or Finlay as the options from which to choose.

== Event ==
Other on-screen personnel
Role:	Name:
English commentators	Michael Cole (Raw)
English commentators	Jerry Lawler (Raw)
English commentators	Jim Ross (SmackDown)
English commentators	Tazz (SmackDown)
English commentators	Todd Grisham (ECW)
English commentators	Matt Striker (ECW)
Spanish commentators	Carlos Cabrera
Spanish commentators	Hugo Savinovich
Backstage interviewers	Todd Grisham
Ring announcers	Lilian Garcia (Raw)
Ring announcers	Justin Roberts (SmackDown)
Ring announcers	Tony Chimel (ECW)
Referees	Charles Robinson
Referees	John Cone
Referees	Mike Chioda
Referees	Scott Armstrong
Referees	Mike Posey
Referees	Chad Patton
Referees	Mark Yeaton

Before the event aired live on pay-per-view, Shelton Benjamin defended the WWE United States Championship against a superstar of the fans' choice in a match that was streamed exclusively on WWE.com. The candidates to be voted in were R-Truth, Montel Vontavious Porter (MVP) and Festus. R-Truth won the poll by 59% over MVP and Festus, and hence faced Benjamin for the title. The match went back and forth, but ultimately Benjamin performed the Paydirt on R-Truth and pinned him to retain his title.

In the first match, Kane faced Rey Mysterio in a No Holds Barred Match. The fans voted the No Holds Barred match stipulation over a Falls Count Anywhere match and a 2-Out-Of-Three Falls Match. Early on in the match, Mysterio used his quickness and agility against Kane, along with some weapons like a Kendo stick and a STOP sign. Soon, Kane overpowered Mysterio and dominated the later part of the match. Near the end, Mysterio drop-toe held Kane and drove him face-first into the steel ring-steps kept in the corner of the ring. Then he hit Kane with a steel chair multiple times, before delivering a 619 and springboard splash and pinning him to win the match.

In the next match, Matt Hardy defended the ECW Championship against Evan Bourne, who the fans voted as the challenger over Mark Henry and Finlay. Early in the match, Bourne surprised Hardy with his agility, but Hardy eventually got control of the match. Nevertheless, Bourne executed several high-flying moves on Hardy, like a standing moonsault, a hurricanrana countering Hardy's Splash Mountain Bomb, and a diving knee drop from the top rope. In the end, Bourne missed the Air Bourne, and hence capitalizing, Hardy delivered a Twist of Fate to Bourne and pinned him to retain his title.

The third match aired was a tag team match with John Morrison and The Miz taking on Cryme Tyme (Shad Gaspard and JTG). This tag team match was chosen over an intergender tag team match having William Regal and Layla taking on Jamie Noble and Mickie James, and a World Tag Team Championship match between the champions Cody Rhodes and Ted DiBiase and the team of CM Punk and Kofi Kingston. The match featured numerous tag team moves from both the teams. At one point, Shad threw JTG over the ropes onto Morrison and The Miz outside the ring. Back in the ring, Morrison and The Miz controlled the latter part of the match. In the end, The Miz, who was not the legal man in the ring, kicked Shad's knee behind the referee's back and Morrison delivered the Moonlight Drive to Shad for the pinfall.

In the fourth match, Santino Marella (with Beth Phoenix) faced The Honky Tonk Man for the Intercontinental Championship. The fans voted Honky Tonk Man as Marella's opponent over Roddy Piper and Goldust. Before the match began, Honky Tonk Man danced to his theme music and asked Marella to do the same, but he delivered a cheap shot to Honky Tonk Man to officially start the match. However, the match ended soon when Beth Phoenix tripped Honky Tonk Man as he prepared to hit Marella with his fist, and hence, the match ended in Honky Tonk Man's favor as he won by disqualification. Nevertheless, Marella remained Intercontinental Champion as the title does not change hands by disqualification. After the match, Piper and Goldust made their way down to the ring confronting Marella. In the ring, Goldust executed the Final Cut on Marella, Piper executed a punch combination followed by an eye poke, and Honky Tonk Man delivered the Shake, Rattle and Roll to Marella.

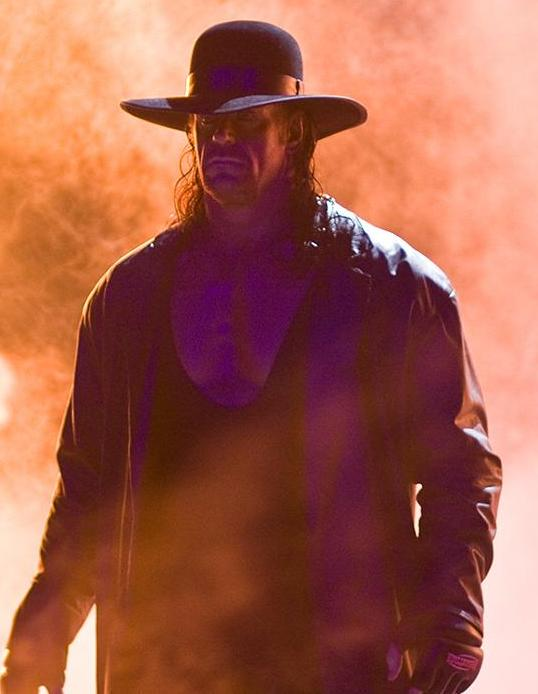
The Undertaker faced Big Show in the fan-voted stipulation of a Last Man Standing match

The fifth match was Last Man Standing match between The Undertaker and Big Show. The fans voted for Last Man Standing match stipulation over a Knockout match and an "I Quit" match. In the beginning, Big Show threw The Undertaker out of the ring, and after some time, The Undertaker hit Big Show with a steel chair. The match continued with Big Show dominating The Undertaker and striking him with punches. The match featured many other spots, like The Undertaker thrusting Big Show's throat against a ringpost with a steel chair; The Undertaker delivering a leg drop to Big Show on the ring apron, and then later countering Big Show's Chokeslam into a DDT; and, then Big Show hitting The Undertaker with a television monitor and even chokeslamming him from the Barricade through an announcer's table. In the end, Big Show executed a chokeslam, followed by a knockout punch to the face and then attacking The Undertaker with a steel chair, but The Undertaker got to his feet each time before the ten count. Finally, The Undertaker locked in Hell's Gate on Big Show causing Big Show to lose consciousness and allowing The Undertaker to win the match.

Throughout the night, a costume contest was held featuring the Divas. The winner was announced in the ring before the WWE Championship match. Mickie James, dressed as Lara Croft, won the contest.

The next match was a WWE Championship match where the fans voted who Triple H's opponent, Jeff Hardy, who won the poll over Vladimir Kozlov. During the start of the match both Hardy and Triple H countered each other's moves, then it was evenly matched. Hardy then executed the Swanton Bomb, then went up to the top rope for a second Swanton Bomb, but was unsuccessful. As Hardy was attempting the move, Triple H got up and countered the move into a Pedigree, pinned Hardy for the win, and retained his WWE title.

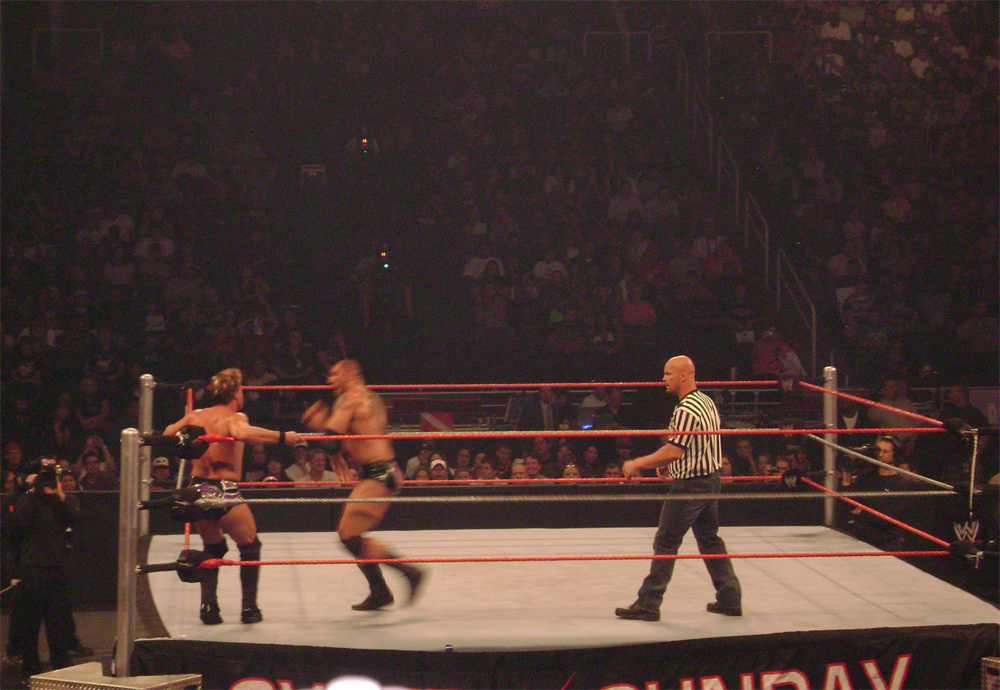
Chris Jericho defended Raw's World Heavyweight Championship against Batista in the main event with "Stone Cold" Steve Austin as the fan-voted special guest referee.

In the main event, Chris Jericho defended his World Heavyweight Championship against Batista. The fans voted for "Stone Cold" Steve Austin to be the special guest referee. Upon hearing the voting results, Jericho attempted to walk away from the match and get counted out, but Austin explained that if Jericho got counted out or disqualified, then he would lose the title, so Jericho ran back in and proceeded with the match. It went back and forth between the two until Batista collided with Austin, allowing Jericho to take advantage of Batista. Shawn Michaels came down to the ring and counted Jericho's attempted pinfall, which Batista kicked out at two. Michaels was about to execute a sweet chin music on Jericho, but instead faked Jericho out. John "Bradshaw" Layfield (JBL) came down to the ring and attacked Michaels. Then Randy Orton came out and was appearing to take over as the special referee, but Austin got up and executed a Stunner on Orton. The match ended with Batista pinning Jericho after a Batista Bomb to become the new World Heavyweight Champion. After the match, Austin and Batista celebrated as they drank beer.

== Reception ==
Canadian Online Explorer's professional wrestling section rated the entire event an 8 out of 10 stars and said that this PPV lived up to its hype. This rating was higher than the previous Cyber Sunday which was rated a 7.5 out of 10 stars.

== Aftermath ==
=== Raw ===
It was announced on the 800th episode celebration of Raw that the World Heavyweight Championship would be defended at Survivor Series against the returning John Cena. Later that night, Chris Jericho defeated Batista to win back the title, resulting in a Jericho versus Cena match at Survivor Series. At Survivor Series, Cena defeated Jericho to win the World Heavyweight Championship.

=== SmackDown ===
The feud between Triple H, Jeff Hardy and Vladimir Kozlov continued. On the November 7 episode of SmackDown, Kozlov defeated the Undertaker via disqualification to win a title match against Triple H at Survivor Series. Hardy asked Vickie Guerrero for another chance at the title, which she refused. Then on the November 14 episode of SmackDown, Hardy defeated Undertaker in an Extreme Rules Match, which led to Guerrero announcing that if Hardy could beat Triple H the next week, the match at Survivor Series would be a triple threat match between Triple H, Kozlov and Hardy. The next week, Hardy defeated Triple H to gain entry into the match. On the morning of Survivor Series, however, the storyline called for Hardy to be found unconscious in his hotel. The WWE Championship was changed to a standard singles match between Kozlov and Triple H, but during the match, Guerrero announced that, as promised, there would be a triple threat match. The angle allowed the returning Edge to make his previously unannounced return in the match and win the WWE Championship.

=== Future ===
The 2008 Cyber Sunday would be WWE's final interactive PPV. In 2009, the event was discontinued and replaced by Bragging Rights. After Cyber Sunday's discontinuation, the fan interaction aspects of the pay-per-view were incorporated into Raw as WWEActive (originally RawActive) for some Raw episodes, which was eventually dropped altogether.

== Results ==
No.	Results	Stipulations	Times
1^{D}	Shelton Benjamin (c) defeated R-Truth^{1}	Singles match for the WWE United States Championship	3:23
2	Rey Mysterio defeated Kane	No Holds Barred match	10:17
3	Matt Hardy (c) defeated Evan Bourne	Singles match for the ECW Championship	11:01
4	John Morrison and The Miz defeated Cryme Tyme (JTG and Shad Gaspard)	Tag team match	10:22
5	The Honky Tonk Man defeated Santino Marella (c) (with Beth Phoenix) by disqualification^{2}	Singles match for the WWE Intercontinental Championship	1:06
6	The Undertaker defeated Big Show	Last Man Standing match	19:23
7	Triple H (c) defeated Jeff Hardy	Singles match for the WWE Championship	15:37
8	Batista defeated Chris Jericho (c)	Singles match for the World Heavyweight Championship with "Stone Cold" Steve Austin as special guest referee (Note: Had Jericho been counted out or disqualified, he would have lost the title.)	17:06
(c) / – the champion(s) heading into the match; D / – this was a dark match

=== Voting results ===
Poll	Results	
Opponent for Shelton Benjamin	R-Truth (59%); Festus (26%); Montel Vontavious Porter (15%)	
Stipulation for Kane vs. Rey Mysterio	No Holds Barred match (39%); Falls Count Anywhere match (35%); Two out of three falls match (26%)	
Opponent for Matt Hardy	Evan Bourne (69%); Finlay (25%); Mark Henry (6%)	
Tag team match selection	John Morrison and The Miz vs. Cryme Tyme (JTG and Shad Gaspard) (38%); Cody Rhodes and Ted DiBiase (c) vs. CM Punk and Kofi Kingston (for the World Tag Team Championship) (35%); Jamie Noble and Mickie James vs. Layla and William Regal (27%)	
Opponent for Santino Marella	The Honky Tonk Man (35%); Roddy Piper (34%); Goldust (31%)	
Stipulation for Big Show vs. The Undertaker	Last Man Standing match (49%); "I Quit" match (42%); Knockout match (9%)	
Winner of the Divas Halloween costume contest	Beth Phoenix (as a gladiator); Brie Bella (as Cleopatra); Candice Michelle (as Marilyn Monroe); Eve Torres (as a Ninja Turtle); Jillian Hall (as Batgirl); Kelly Kelly (as a sailor); Katie Lea Burchill (as a vampire); Layla (as Princess Leia)	Lena Yada (as a ninja); Maria (as a bunny); Maryse (as a French maid); Michelle McCool (as a soldier); Mickie James (as Lara Croft); Natalya (as a police officer); Tiffany (as a nun); Victoria (as a banana)
Opponent for Triple H	Jeff Hardy (57%); Jeff Hardy and Vladimir Kozlov (Triple threat match) (38%); Vladimir Kozlov (5%)	
Special guest referee for Chris Jericho vs. Batista	"Stone Cold" Steve Austin (74%); Shawn Michaels (22%); Randy Orton (4%)	

== Footnotes ==
- – Before the event was broadcast live on pay-per-view, this match was shown live via a webcast on WWE.com, WWE's official website.
- – A regulation in WWE is that championships cannot be won by disqualification; even though the champion lost the match, he retains the title.
