= Cyber Sunday (2007) =

World Wrestling Entertainment pay-per-view event

- Promotional poster featuring Candice Michelle
- Promotion: World Wrestling Entertainment
- Brand(s): Raw; SmackDown! ECW
- Date: October 28, 2007
- City: Washington, D.C.
- Venue: Verizon Center
- Attendance: 10,094
- Buy rate: 194,000
- Tagline: Log on. Take over.

Pay-per-view chronology
← Previous; No Mercy	Next → Survivor Series

Cyber Sunday/Taboo Tuesday chronology
← Previous; 2006	Next → 2008

The 2007 Cyber Sunday was a professional wrestling pay-per-view (PPV) event produced by World Wrestling Entertainment (WWE). It was the fourth annual Taboo Tuesday/Cyber Sunday and took place on October 28, 2007, at the Verizon Center in Washington, D.C., held for wrestlers from the promotion's Raw, SmackDown!, and ECW brand divisions. The concept was that it was an interactive pay-per-view in which fans could vote on aspects of the matches, like stipulations or participants. The voting started on October 9, 2007, through WWE's official website and ended during the broadcast.

While this was WWE's fourth interactive PPV, it was only the second titled Cyber Sunday as the first two events were titled Taboo Tuesday as they were held on a Tuesday before WWE moved the event to the more traditional Sunday in 2006. This was also the first in this interactive PPV series to be promoted for wrestlers from multiple brands, after the first three events were held for Raw, as WWE discontinued brand-exclusive PPVs after WrestleMania 23 in April. The event had 194,000 PPV buys, down from the 2006 figure of 228,000 buys.

The main match on the SmackDown! brand was Batista versus The Undertaker for the World Heavyweight Championship, which Batista won by pinfall after executing a Batista Bomb. The special guest referee, which was either "Stone Cold" Steve Austin, John "Bradshaw" Layfield, or Mick Foley. The predominant match on the Raw brand was for the WWE Championship between Randy Orton and the fans' choice of either Shawn Michaels, Jeff Hardy, or Mr. Kennedy.

Most of the existing feuds continued after the event. Notably, Shawn Michaels would continue to feud with Randy Orton over the WWE Championship, which led to a match at Survivor Series for the championship, which Orton won. After losing to Batista, Undertaker challenged Batista to a Hell in a Cell match at Survivor Series for the World Heavyweight Championship, which Batista won after Edge interfered. Edge then became a part of the feud and it became a Triple Threat match at Armageddon for the title, which Edge won. After beating Umaga in a Street Fight, Triple H faced off against Umaga as part of a Survivor Series match, which Triple H's team won, ending their feud.

== Production ==
=== Background ===
Cyber Sunday, originally known as Taboo Tuesday, was an annual professional wrestling pay-per-view (PPV) event produced by World Wrestling Entertainment (WWE) since 2004. A unique feature of the event was the ability for fans to vote on certain aspects of every match. Because of this, the event was billed as an "interactive pay-per-view". The fourth event was scheduled to be held on October 28, 2007, at the Verizon Center in Washington, D.C. The voting started on October 9, 2007, through WWE's official website and ended during the broadcast. Although this was the fourth event in this interactive PPV series, it was only the second to be titled Cyber Sunday, as the first two events were titled Taboo Tuesday; the first two events were held on a Tuesday before WWE moved the event to the more traditional Sunday for PPVs in 2006.

While the first three events were produced for the Raw brand, the 2007 event featured wrestlers from the Raw, SmackDown!, and ECW brands, as following WrestleMania 23 earlier in April, WWE discontinued brand-exclusive PPVs, thus marking the first event in this interactive PPV series to be promoted for multiple brands. It was also the last PPV in this series to be broadcast in 4:3 format as in January 2008, all WWE shows began broadcasting in high definition.

=== Storylines ===
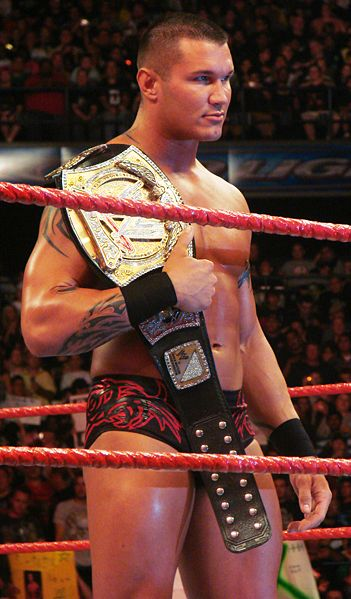
Randy Orton as Raw's WWE Champion

The main feud heading into Cyber Sunday on the Raw brand was between Randy Orton and Shawn Michaels, with the two battling over the WWE Championship. This feud began in May when Michaels faced Edge in Edge's last match on Raw, which Michaels won the match by pinfall after Sweet Chin Music. After the match, Orton came out and attacked Michaels, which was preceded by a punt to the head. At Judgment Day, Orton attacked Michaels before their scheduled match, where Orton defeated him via referee stoppage. After the match, Orton again attacked Michaels, putting him out of action for several months. Their feud restarted on the October 8, 2007, episode of Raw, the night after Orton won the WWE Championship. Michaels returned during Orton's appreciation ceremony and hit him with Sweet Chin Music, when Orton was going to hit Michaels with the WWE Championship belt. Afterwards, a match was made for Cyber Sunday where Orton would defend the WWE Championship against the fans' choice of either Michaels, Jeff Hardy, or Mr. Kennedy. The next week on Raw, Orton faced his three possible opponents in individual matches. Kennedy interfered and attacked Hardy in his match with Orton. Hardy attacked Kennedy in his match, and Kennedy assaulted Michaels in his match, leading to Hardy making the save. Despite this, Michaels hit Orton with Sweet Chin Music to end the show. On October 22, on Raw, Hardy and Michaels defeated Kennedy and Orton in a tag team match. After the match, Michaels hit Orton with Sweet Chin Music for the third week in a row, when Orton went to deliver Hardy an RKO.

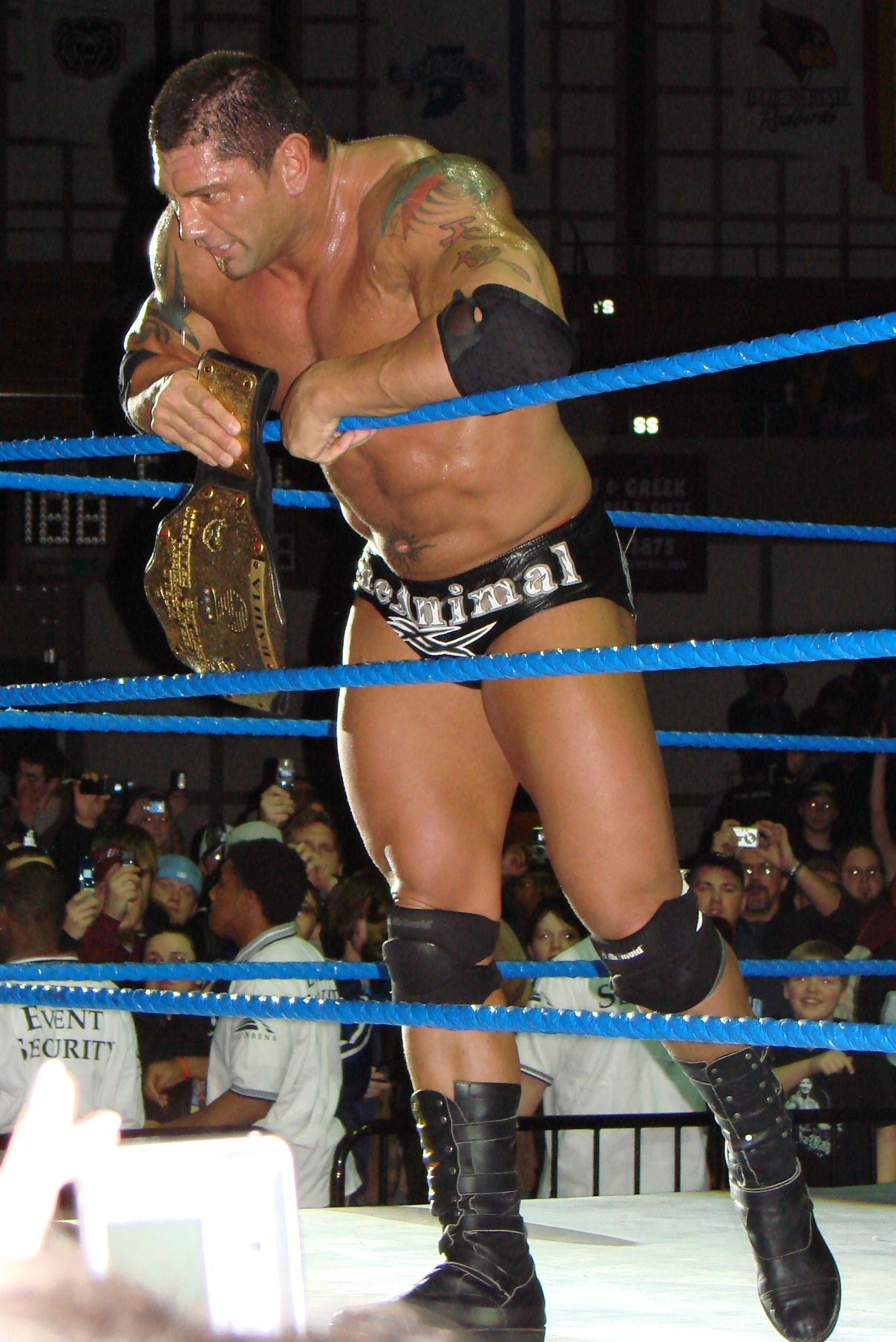
Batista as SmackDown!'s World Heavyweight Champion

The main feud on the SmackDown! brand was between Batista and The Undertaker, with the two feuding over the World Heavyweight Championship. Their feud began at WrestleMania 23 when The Undertaker won the title from Batista. It ended when The Undertaker faced Batista in a steel cage match. The match became a draw, when both The Undertaker and Batista's feet both hit the ground at the same time. After the match, the returning Mark Henry came out and attacked The Undertaker. Edge then came out and cashed in his Money in the Bank contract that he won from Mr. Kennedy the same week on Raw and defeated the Undertaker to win the World Heavyweight Championship, which then ended the feud between The Undertaker and Batista. The Undertaker was sidelined due to the injury, but was booked to return at Unforgiven. Soon after returning at Unforgiven in September, their feud restarted. A match between the two was made for Cyber Sunday with a special guest referee selected by the fans between "Stone Cold" Steve Austin, John "Bradshaw" Layfield (JBL), and Mick Foley. Neither Foley or Austin appeared before Cyber Sunday, while JBL began campaigning with banners, T-shirts, and buttons.

The main feud on the ECW brand involved CM Punk and his ECW Championship. Punk had just retained his title against Big Daddy V at No Mercy, the previous pay-per-view. John Morrison, whom Punk defeated for the title, returned on the October 9 episode of ECW, after a brief absence, and defeated Punk in a non-title match. The Cyber Sunday match was then made to be CM Punk defending the ECW Championship against the fans' choice between Big Daddy V, Morrison, and The Miz. The next week on ECW, Punk, along with Kane, defeated his three possible opponents in a 3-on-2 handicap match. Morrison and The Miz (who were a tag team) turned on each other, and they faced each other in a match later in the show, which was interrupted by Big Daddy V. On the October 23 episode of ECW, Big Daddy V faced Kane, and Punk teamed with Balls Mahoney to face The Miz and Morrison in a tag team match, which they won due to a miscommunication between The Miz and Morrison.

The feuds between Triple H and Umaga, Rey Mysterio and Finlay, and Matt Hardy and Montel Vontavious Porter also continued, resulting in their matches at Cyber Sunday. Fans could vote for the match type of these three matches. Hardy, however, suffered a head injury on the October 26 episode of SmackDown!.

== Event ==
Other on-screen personnel
Role:	Name:
English commentators	Jim Ross (Raw)
English commentators	Jerry Lawler (Raw)
English commentators	Michael Cole (SmackDown!)
English commentators	John "Bradshaw" Layfield (SmackDown!)
English commentators	Joey Styles (ECW)
English commentators	Tazz (ECW)
Spanish commentators	Carlos Cabrera
Spanish commentators	Hugo Savinovich
Backstage interviewers	Anastacia Rose
Backstage interviewers	Todd Grisham
Ring announcer	Lilian Garcia (Raw)
Ring announcer	Justin Roberts (SmackDown!)
Ring announcer	Tony Chimel (ECW)
Referees	Charles Robinson
Referees	Mickie Henson
Referees	Mike Chioda
Referees	Marty Elias
Referees	Mike Posey
Referees	Chad Patton

Before the event went live on pay-per-view, Jesse and Festus defeated Deuce 'n Domino in a dark match. Throughout the event, the WWE Divas were shown in Halloween costumes in a contest where the winner would be determined by the fans.

=== Preliminary matches ===
The first match that aired was between Rey Mysterio and Finlay, voted by the fans to be a Stretcher match. Finlay managed to retrieve his shillelagh and attacked Mysterio's legs. Mysterio fought back and performed the 619 on Finlay, sending him onto the stretcher. Mysterio then performed a senton and pushed Finlay over the line for the win.

It was announced that Matt Hardy was not medically cleared to compete (due to a legitimate injury suffered on a previous episode of SmackDown!), and a match was announced with Montel Vontavious Porter (MVP) defending his WWE United States Championship against the fans' choice between Kane, The Great Khali, and Mark Henry. The second match was for the ECW Championship between CM Punk and The Miz, the winner of the voting. The match was back and forth for the first half of the match. The Miz gained the advantage after forcing Punk to fall from the second rope. Punk came back after hip tossing The Miz from the top rope. Punk won the match after a GTS.

The voting results for the WWE Championship match were then revealed, with Shawn Michaels winning. A bonus match was made between the two losers in the voting, Jeff Hardy and Mr. Kennedy. Hardy gained the advantage after dropkicking Kennedy off the apron to ringside. Kennedy came back after throwing Hardy out of the ring. Hardy regained control with a top rope Hurricanrana. Kennedy won the match via pinfall after Hardy missed a rope-aided corner dropkick.

The fourth match was between MVP and Kane for the United States Championship. Kane quickly gained control, but MVP had the advantage after attacking Kane's injured ribs. Kane came back, and targeted MVP's ribs. Kane dominated until MVP rolled outside the ring and was counted out. Kane won the match, and MVP retained his title as a title could not change hands on a countout.

=== Main event matches ===
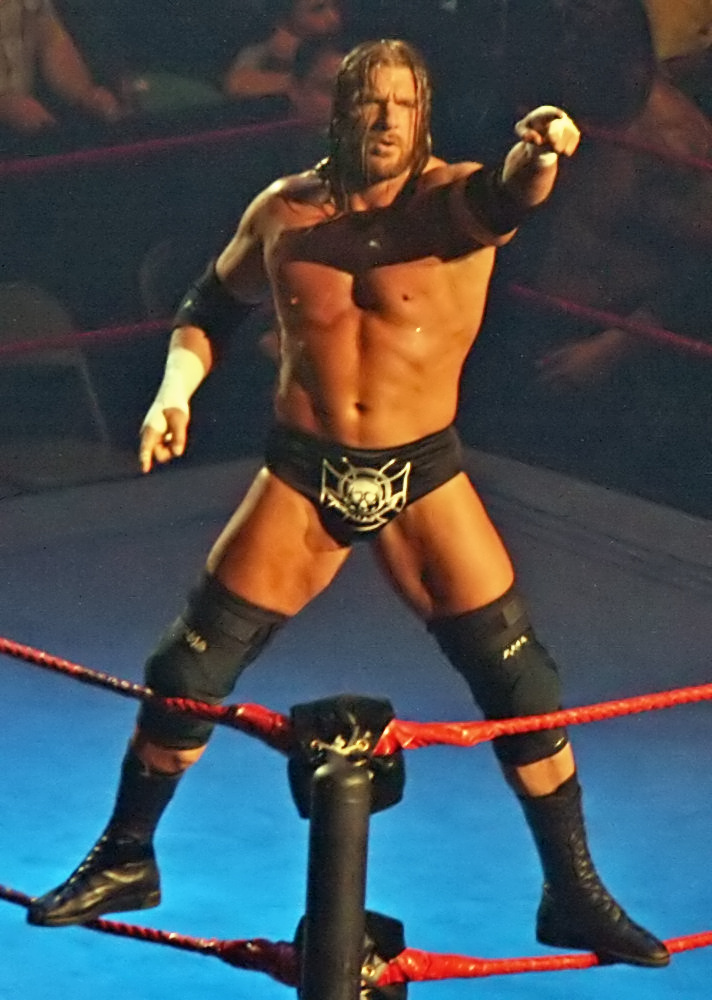
Triple H who faced Umaga in a Street Fight

The WWE Championship match between Randy Orton and Shawn Michaels followed. After starting back and forth, Michaels took advantage by targeting Orton's left arm. Orton regained the advantage after a Belly to back suplex to Michaels onto the barricade, and subsequent attacks to the back. Near the end of the match, Michaels regained the upper hand, but as he was attempting "Sweet Chin Music", Orton delivered a low blow to Michaels. Michaels won the match by disqualification, but Orton retained his title. After the match, Orton attempted a running punt to the fallen Michaels, but before he could, Michaels got up, and performed Sweet Chin Music on Orton.

The sixth match was between Triple H and Umaga, voted by the fans to be a Street Fight, where the match could take place anywhere in the arena, and any weapon could be used. The match began in the entrance area and involved Umaga getting speared through the stage setting. The match moved into the audience before returning to the ring. Several weapons were used, and Umaga splashed Triple H through an announce table. The match ended when Triple H hit Umaga with a sledgehammer and performed a Pedigree to score the victory via pinfall. Mickie James was then announced to be the winner of the Divas Halloween costume contest.

The main event saw Batista defend the World Heavyweight Championship against The Undertaker, with "Stone Cold" Steve Austin as the special guest referee. Both John "Bradshaw" Layfield (JBL) and Mick Foley came into the ring and fought before Austin came down and delivered a Stone Cold Stunner to both men. Both Batista and The Undertaker had the match in their advantage. Batista performed a series of powerslams and throws on The Undertaker. The Undertaker, however, chokeslammed Batista, but only got a two count. The Undertaker then followed up with a Last Ride but for a kickout at two. The Undertaker then went for a Tombstone Piledriver, but Batista reversed the move into a Spinebuster, but got a two-count. Batista then executed a Batista Bomb on The Undertaker, but The Undertaker kicked out. Batista then executed another Batista Bomb and pinned The Undertaker to retain the World Heavyweight Championship.

== Aftermath ==
The feud between Randy Orton and Shawn Michaels continued the following night on Raw, when Michaels demanded a title rematch due to how the match ended. Their rematch was made for the following pay-per-view, Survivor Series. As in added stipulation the title match, Michaels was banned from using the "Sweet Chin Music" by orders of Raw General Manager William Regal. In the same stipulation, if Orton caused a disqualification of any sort, he would lose the WWE Championship. Using the special stipulations of the match, Orton pinned Michaels after an "RKO" (a jumping cutter) to retain the title. After Survivor Series their feud ended.

The feud between Batista and The Undertaker also continued, with both agreeing to compete in a Hell in a Cell match at Survivor Series on the November 2 episode of SmackDown!. Near the end of the match at Survivor Series, The Undertaker looked to have Batista defeated, but Edge returned and joined the feud by attacking The Undertaker and letting Batista retain the World Heavyweight Championship.

The feud between Triple H and Umaga continued after Cyber Sunday with the two choosing four other men to make a five-on-five elimination tag team match at Survivor Series. Matt Hardy, who was chosen to be on Triple H's team suffered an injury caused by Montel Vontavious Porter (MVP) on the November 16 episode of SmackDown!, which made the match at Survivor Series a four-on-five elimination tag team match. Triple H's team won the match after Jeff Hardy pinned Umaga.

== Results ==
No.	Results	Stipulations	Times
1^{D}	Jesse and Festus defeated Deuce 'n Domino (with Cherry)	Tag team match	12:33
2	Rey Mysterio defeated Finlay	Stretcher match	09:41
3	CM Punk (c) defeated The Miz	Singles match for the ECW Championship	08:48
4	Mr. Kennedy defeated Jeff Hardy	Singles match	09:05
5	Kane defeated Montel Vontavious Porter (c) by countout	Singles match for the WWE United States Championship	06:38
6	Shawn Michaels defeated Randy Orton (c) by disqualification	Singles match for the WWE Championship	15:53
7	Triple H defeated Umaga	Street Fight	17:21
8	Batista (c) defeated The Undertaker	Singles match for the World Heavyweight Championship with "Stone Cold" Steve Austin as special guest referee	17:22
(c) / – the champion(s) heading into the match; D / – this was a dark match

=== Voting results ===
Poll	Results	
Stipulations for Rey Mysterio versus Finlay	Stretcher match (40%); No Disqualification match (36%); Shillelagh on a Pole match (24%)	
Opponent for CM Punk	The Miz (39%); John Morrison (33%); Big Daddy V (28%)	
Opponent for Montel Vontavious Porter	Kane (67%); The Great Khali (24%); Mark Henry (9%)	
Opponent for Randy Orton	Shawn Michaels (59%); Jeff Hardy (31%); Mr. Kennedy (10%)	
Stipulations for Triple H versus Umaga	Street Fight (57%); Steel Cage match (26%); First Blood match (17%)	
Winner of the Divas Halloween Costume Contest	Mickie James (21%); Kelly Kelly (17%); Torrie Wilson (15%); Melina (12%); Maria (12%)	Layla (7%); Jillian Hall (5%); Victoria (4%); Brooke (4%); Michelle McCool (3%)
Special guest referee for Batista versus The Undertaker	Stone Cold Steve Austin (79%); Mick Foley (11%); John "Bradshaw" Layfield (10%)	
