= Bragging Rights (2009) =

World Wrestling Entertainment pay-per-view event

- Promotional poster featuring various WWE wrestlers
- Promotion: World Wrestling Entertainment
- Brand(s): Raw; SmackDown; ECW
- Date: October 25, 2009
- City: Pittsburgh, Pennsylvania
- Venue: Mellon Arena
- Attendance: 13,562
- Buy rate: 181,000

Pay-per-view chronology
← Previous; Hell in a Cell	Next → Survivor Series

Bragging Rights chronology
← Previous; First	Next → 2010

The 2009 Bragging Rights was a professional wrestling pay-per-view (PPV) event produced by World Wrestling Entertainment (WWE). It was the inaugural Bragging Rights and took place on October 25, 2009, at the Mellon Arena in Pittsburgh, Pennsylvania, held for wrestlers from the promotion's Raw, SmackDown, and ECW brand divisions. The concept of the event was based around a series of interpromotional matches for "bragging rights" between wrestlers from the Raw and SmackDown brands with a Bragging Rights Trophy awarded to the brand that won the most matches out of the series.

Six matches were featured on the card. Both the Raw and SmackDown world championships were defended, but these were not interpromotional matches. In the main event, which was Raw's world title match, John Cena defeated Randy Orton in an Anything Goes Iron Man match to win the WWE Championship, while in SmackDown's world title match, The Undertaker defeated CM Punk, Rey Mysterio, and Batista in a fatal four-way match to retain the World Heavyweight Championship. Although an ECW Championship match occurred as a dark match prior to the show, the ECW brand was not involved in the brand competition.

The "bagging rights" series consisted of three matches. These included Raw's United States Champion The Miz defeating SmackDown's Intercontinental Champion John Morrison in a non-title match, SmackDown's team of Michelle McCool, Beth Phoenix, and Natalya defeating Raw's team of Melina, Kelly Kelly, and Gail Kim, and SmackDown's team of Chris Jericho, Kane, R-Truth, Matt Hardy, Finlay, Tyson Kidd, and David Hart Smith defeating Raw's team of Triple H, Shawn Michaels, Big Show, Cody Rhodes, Jack Swagger, Kofi Kingston, and Mark Henry. The SmackDown brand won the Bragging Rights Trophy by 2–1.

This was WWE's final PPV event held at the Mellon Arena as it was demolished and replaced by the Consol Energy Center in 2010. The event also replaced Cyber Sunday that was held annually in late October – early November. This would be the only Bragging Rights to include ECW and its championship as the brand was dissolved in February 2010, deactivating the championship along with it.

== Production ==
=== Background ===
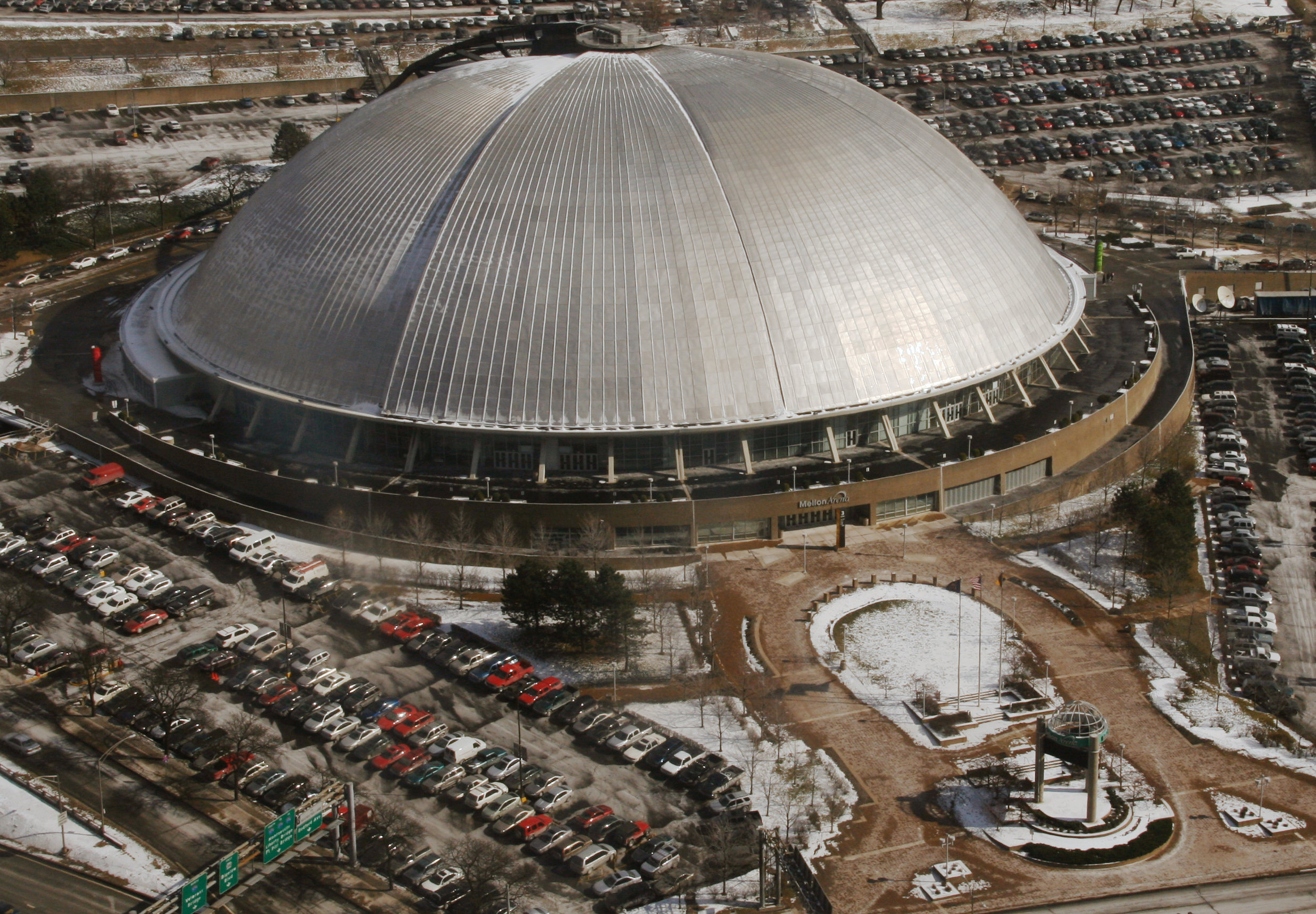
The inaugural Bragging Rights was held at the Mellon Arena in Pittsburgh, Pennsylvania, which was WWE's final pay-per-view event at the venue as it was demolished and replaced by the Consol Energy Center in 2010.

In 2009, World Wrestling Entertainment (WWE) scheduled a professional wrestling pay-per-view (PPV) event titled Bragging Rights to be held on October 25, 2009, at the Mellon Arena in Pittsburgh, Pennsylvania. The event replaced Cyber Sunday, which was previously held annually in late October – early November. The concept of Bragging Rights was based around a series of interpromotional matches for "bragging rights" between wrestlers of the Raw and SmackDown brands, with a Bragging Rights Trophy awarded to the brand that won the most matches out of the series. Although the ECW brand had a dark match prior to the show, it was not involved in the interbrand competition.

=== Storylines ===
On the October 12 episode of Raw, it was announced one-half of Unified WWE Tag Team Champions Chris Jericho would act as the co-captain of SmackDown's team with Kane as the other co-captain, and Shawn Michaels and Triple H (collectively known as D-Generation X) would act as the co-captains of Raw's team. Later in the program, the other half of the Tag Team Champions, Big Show, would qualify for the latter team by defeating Chris Jericho in a match that would qualify him to be on the team. Continuing the trend of qualifying matches on said episode of Raw, Cody Rhodes defeated Ted DiBiase and John Cena in a triple threat match, Jack Swagger defeated Montel Vontavious Porter, and Kofi Kingston defeated Evan Bourne. Mark Henry became the final member of Team Raw by defeating Chris Masters on the October 15 episode of WWE Superstars. The following night on SmackDown, Kane revealed that in fact the SmackDown team would be co-captained both by Jericho and himself. Qualifying matches for the SmackDown team commenced on the same night, with Dolph Ziggler defeating Mike Knox and Finlay in a Triple Threat match, Shad Gaspard and JTG (collectively known as Cryme Tyme) defeating David Hart Smith and Tyson Kidd (collectively known as The Hart Dynasty), Eric Escobar defeating Matt Hardy, and Drew McIntyre defeating R-Truth. On the October 23 episode of SmackDown, Jericho and Kane booked a 4-on-5 handicap match pitting Ziggler, JTG, Escobar, and McIntyre against Finlay, the Hart Dynasty, Hardy, and R-Truth, where the winning team would join the two at Bragging Rights. The latter team won the match, thus replacing the former team, along with Gaspard.

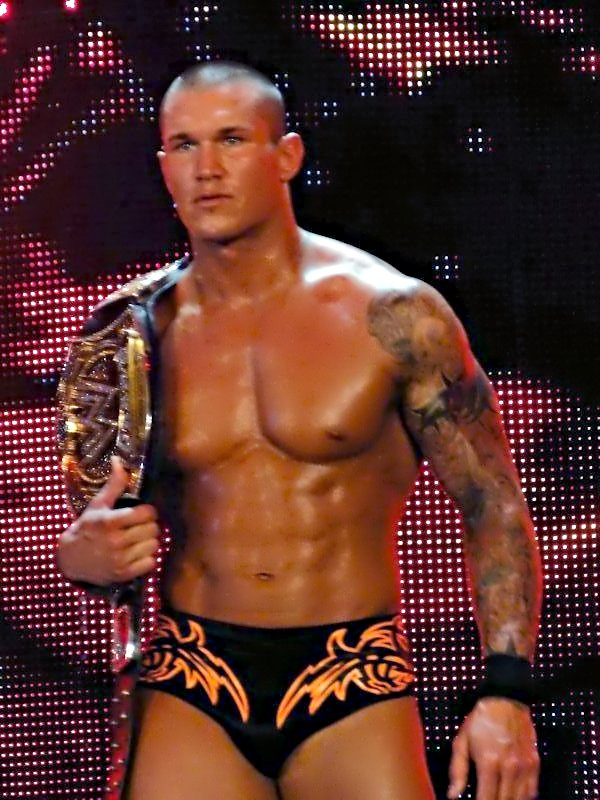
Randy Orton lost Raw's WWE Championship to John Cena in a 60-minute Iron Man match.

The main rivalry from the Raw brand heading into Bragging Rights was the continuing conflict between Randy Orton and John Cena over the WWE Championship. The two had faced at the three previous pay-per-view events, with Orton retaining the title at SummerSlam, Cena winning the title at Breaking Point in an "I Quit" match, and Orton reclaiming the title at Hell in a Cell in the event's eponymous match. On the October 5 episode of Raw, Cena challenged Orton to one last rematch for the title, this time a 60-minute Iron Man match where the competitor with the most decisions at the end of that time would be named the victor. In order to accept the challenge, Orton added two more conditions to the match—if Cena loses, he would leave Raw and that the match would be "anything goes".

The Undertaker returned to WWE at SummerSlam after CM Punk won the World Heavyweight Championship. Punk would then defeat his challenger at Breaking Point under controversial circumstances before losing the title to The Undertaker at Hell in a Cell a month later. On the October 9 episode of SmackDown, WWE Chairman Vince McMahon announced Punk would get his rematch at Bragging Rights, but it would be in a fatal four-way match with Batista and Rey Mysterio.

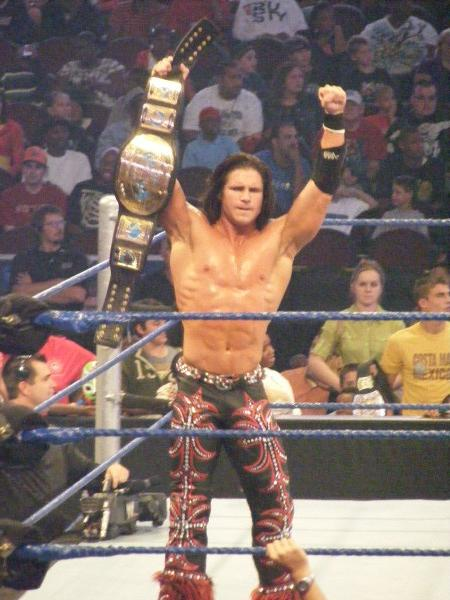
SmackDown's Intercontinental Champion John Morrison lost against Raw's United States Champion The Miz.

On the October 12 episode of Raw, the reigning WWE United States Champion, The Miz, announced that he would face the WWE Intercontinental Champion John Morrison at Bragging Rights. In 2007, the two formed a tag team and gained success in the tag team division, winning the WWE Tag Team and World Tag Team Championships as well as the 2008 Slammy Award for Tag Team of the Year. In an untelevised match at WrestleMania XXV, the team lost their unification match against The Colóns (Carlito and Primo) that would form the Unified WWE Tag Team Championship. A week later, The Miz found himself drafted to the Raw brand in the 2009 WWE Draft due to botched interference from Morrison. Miz subsequently attacked Morrison after the match, ending the partnership. Morrison was later himself drafted to the SmackDown brand. Both wrestlers found singles success with Morrison winning his third Intercontinental Championship from Rey Mysterio on the September 4 episode of SmackDown, while The Miz defeated Kofi Kingston to become the new United States Champion on the October 5 episode of Raw.

== Event ==
Other on-screen personnel
Role:	Name:
Commentators	Michael Cole
Commentators	Jerry Lawler
Commentators	Todd Grisham
Interviewer	Josh Mathews
Ring announcer	Tony Chimel; Justin Roberts
Referees	Charles Robinson
Referees	John Cone
Referees	Mike Chioda
Referees	Jack Doan

Before the event aired live on pay-per-view, a dark match took place in which Christian defeated Paul Burchill to retain the ECW Championship.

=== Preliminary matches ===
In the first match, SmackDown's Intercontinental Champion John Morrison faced Raw's United States Champion The Miz in a non-title match that was the first of three Bragging Rights matches for the Bragging Rights Trophy. During the match, Morrison performed a Flying Chuck on The Miz, but The Miz placed his foot on the bottom rope to void the pinfall. In the end, Morrison attempted Starship Pain on The Miz, but The Miz pushed Morrison's legs to counter the move and pinned Morrison to win the first match for Raw.

Next, SmackDown's team of Michelle McCool, Beth Phoenix, and Natalya faced Raw's team Melina, Kelly Kelly, and Gail Kim in a six-diva interbrand tag team match that was the second of three Bragging Rights matches. Phoenix pinned Melina after a Glam Slam to win the match for SmackDown, tying the score at 1–1.

In the third match, The Undertaker defended the World Heavyweight Championship against CM Punk, Rey Mysterio, and Batista in a fatal four-way match. During the match, Batista performed a spinebuster on The Undertaker, but Punk broke up the pinfall. Punk performed a GTS on Mysterio, but Batista broke up the pinfall. The Undertaker applied Hell's Gate on Batista, but Punk broke the hold. The Undertaker performed a Last Ride on Punk, but Batista broke up the pinfall. Batista performed a Batista Bomb on The Undertaker, but Mysterio broke up a pinfall. The Undertaker pinned Batista after a Tombstone Piledriver to win the match and retain the World Heavyweight Championship. After the match, Josh Matthews interviewed Mysterio and Batista. Batista attacked Mysterio, turning heel.

In the fourth match, Team Raw (D-Generation X (Triple H and Shawn Michaels), Big Show, Cody Rhodes, Jack Swagger, Kofi Kingston, and Mark Henry) faced Team SmackDown (Chris Jericho, Kane, R-Truth, Matt Hardy, Finlay, and The Hart Dynasty (Tyson Kidd and David Hart Smith) in an interbrand 14-man tag team match that was the third and final Bragging Rights match, which would decide the winner of the Bragging Rights Trophy as the score was tied at 1–1. In the climax, Big Show performed a chokeslam on Kingston, betraying Team Raw. Triple H confronted Big Show, who delivered a knockout punch to Triple H. Jericho pinned Kingston to win the match for Team SmackDown, thus SmackDown won the Bragging Rights Trophy by 2–1.

=== Main event ===
In the main event, Randy Orton defended the WWE Championship against John Cena in a 60-minute Anything Goes Iron Man match, in which the stipulation stated that if Cena lost, he would have to leave the Raw brand. Cena earned the first fall, locking the STF in on Orton less than 4 minutes in, and Orton tapped quickly, mostly to avoid taking huge damage early on. Orton pinned Cena after an RKO, making the score 1–1. Cena attempted to perform an Attitude Adjustment on Orton while Orton countered the move into an RKO, resulting in a double pinfall, making the score 2–2. Cena pinned Orton after an Attitude Adjustment off the top rope, making the score 3–2. Cody Rhodes and Ted DiBiase then interfered, with DiBiase performing a Dream Street on Cena. Rhodes and DiBiase placed Orton on top of Cena for a pin, making the score 3–3. Kofi Kingston then emerged with a steel chair, forcing Rhodes and DiBiase to retreat. Orton pinned Cena after throwing Cena through the electronic wall, making the score 4–3. Cena pinned Orton with a small package, making the score 4–4. Orton pinned Cena after an elevated DDT onto the arena floor, making the score 5–4. Cena pinned Orton after an Attitude Adjustment through the announce table, making the score 5–5. Orton performed an RKO on Cena for a near-fall. Orton attempted to perform a punt kick on Cena, but Cena countered the move into the STF and forced Orton to submit, making the score 6–5 to Cena, who won his fifth WWE Championship as well as ending the two year long feud with Orton.

== Reception ==
The event was generally well received by critics, with positive comments on the opening bout between Morrison and The Miz and mostly on the Iron Man match main event. The pay-per-view drew 181,000 buys, and is up from the 153,000 buys Cyber Sunday 2008 got. Bleacher Report gave the entire event a ratings of 8.5 out of 10 and gave the Iron man match a ratings of 4.5 out of 5, the highest rated match of the event.

== Aftermath ==
The 2009 Bragging Rights would be the only Bragging Rights to feature ECW in any capacity, as the brand was disbanded in February 2010. Bragging Rights itself would be a short-lived PPV, as the 2010 event was the only other Bragging Rights PPV produced as it was replaced by the returning Vengeance in 2011. In 2016 after the second brand extension was introduced, a similar brand competition theme was used for that year's Survivor Series, and the annual Survivor Series revolved around competition for brand supremacy until 2021. In addition, Bragging Rights would be the final WWE pay-per-view event held at Mellon Arena, as the arena was demolished to make way for Consol Energy Center, which opened in August 2010, although the final WWE televised event was held on the May 10, 2010, episode of Raw.

This was the only Bragging Rights event held before the original World Tag Team Championship was deactivated in August 2010 in favor of the WWE Tag Team Championship; since WrestleMania 25 in April, both titles were held and defended together across all brands as the Unified WWE Tag Team Championship. It would also be the only Bragging Rights event held before the original WWE Women's Championship was deactivated in September 2010 in favor of the WWE Divas Championship.

== Results ==
No.	Results	Stipulations	Times
1^{D}	Christian (c) defeated Paul Burchill by pinfall	Singles match for the ECW Championship	7:33
2	The Miz (Raw) defeated John Morrison (SmackDown) by pinfall	Singles match	10:53
3	Beth Phoenix, Michelle McCool, and Natalya (SmackDown) defeated Gail Kim, Kelly Kelly, and Melina (Raw) by pinfall	Six-Diva tag team match	6:13
4	The Undertaker (c) defeated Batista, CM Punk, and Rey Mysterio by pinfall	Fatal four-way match for the World Heavyweight Championship	9:59
5	Team SmackDown (Chris Jericho, David Hart Smith, Finlay, Kane, Matt Hardy, R-Truth, and Tyson Kidd) defeated Team Raw (Big Show, Cody Rhodes, Jack Swagger, Kofi Kingston, Mark Henry, Shawn Michaels, and Triple H) by pinfall	14-man Tag Team match for the Bragging Rights Trophy	15:33
6	John Cena defeated Randy Orton (c) 6–5	60-minute Anything Goes Iron man match for the WWE Championship; Had Cena lost, he would have been forced to leave the Raw brand and join SmackDown or ECW.	1:00:00
(c) / – the champion(s) heading into the match; D / – this was a dark match

=== Iron Man match ===
Score		Point winner	Decision	Notes	Time
Orton	Cena	Point winner	Decision	Notes	Time
0	1	John Cena	Submission	Cena submitted Orton to the STF	3:55
1	1	Randy Orton	Pinfall	Orton pinned Cena after the RKO	9:00
2	2	John Cena and Randy Orton	Pinfall	Both men pinned each other	16:45
2	3	John Cena	Pinfall	Cena pinned Orton after the Avalanche Attitude Adjustment	19:22
3	3	Randy Orton	Pinfall	Orton pinned Cena after Dream Street from Ted DiBiase Jr.	20:41
4	3	Randy Orton	Pinfall	Orton pinned Cena after throwing him through the lighting grid	25:20
4	4	John Cena	Pinfall	Cena pinned Orton with a small package	33:00
5	4	Randy Orton	Pinfall	Orton pinned Cena after the Elevated DDT from the ring apron to the floor	35:20
5	5	John Cena	Pinfall	Cena pinned Orton after an Attitude Adjustment through the announce table	51:00
5	6	John Cena	Submission	Cena submitted Orton to the STF	59:54
