= Bragging Rights (disambiguation) =

Bragging rights is the prerogative to praise oneself for an accomplishment or for possession of a superior characteristic.

Bragging Rights may also refer to:

- WWE Bragging Rights, a professional wrestling event
- No Bragging Rights, an American melodic hardcore band
- Braggin' Rights, men's college basketball contest
- Bragging Rights!, a former local game show airing on WBBZ-TV in Springville, New York
- Floyd Mayweather Jr. vs. Logan Paul, a boxing exhibition match which has a billed name
