= Taboo Tuesday (2004) =

World Wrestling Entertainment pay-per-view event

- Promotional poster featuring the World Heavyweight Championship with Triple H on the background
- Promotion: World Wrestling Entertainment
- Brand: Raw
- Date: October 19, 2004
- City: Milwaukee, Wisconsin
- Venue: Bradley Center
- Attendance: 3,500
- Buy rate: 174,000
- Tagline: "You Control – The fate of Raw superstars, the World Heavyweight Championship, and the Course of History!"

Pay-per-view chronology
← Previous; No Mercy	Next → Survivor Series

Taboo Tuesday/Cyber Sunday chronology
← Previous; First	Next → 2005

The 2004 Taboo Tuesday was a professional wrestling pay-per-view (PPV) event produced by World Wrestling Entertainment (WWE). It was the inaugural Taboo Tuesday/Cyber Sunday and took place on Tuesday, October 19, 2004, at the Bradley Center in Milwaukee, Wisconsin, held exclusively for wrestlers from the promotion's Raw brand division.

The concept was that it was an interactive pay-per-view in which fans could vote on aspects of the matches, like stipulations or participants. The voting started on October 18, 2004, through WWE's official website and ended during the broadcast. This was also WWE's first PPV event to be held on a Tuesday since This Tuesday in Texas in 1991. In 2006, the event was moved to the traditional Sunday nights for PPVs and was renamed Cyber Sunday.

Eight professional wrestling matches were featured on the event's card. The main event was a steel cage match in which Randy Orton defeated Ric Flair by pinfall; this marked the only time Flair ever headlined a WWE pay-per-view event. Two bouts were featured on the undercard. In respective singles matches, World Heavyweight Champion Triple H defeated Shawn Michaels to retain his title and Gene Snitsky defeated Kane in a Weapon of Choice match.

Taboo Tuesday grossed over $215,000 in ticket sales from an attendance of 3,500 and received 174,000 pay-per-view buys. This event helped WWE increase its pay-per-view revenue by $6.2m compared to the previous year. When the event was released on DVD, it reached a peak position of seventh on Billboard's DVD Sales Chart.

== Production ==
=== Background ===
In 2004, World Wrestling Entertainment (WWE) scheduled a professional wrestling pay-per-view (PPV) event entitled Taboo Tuesday to be held on Tuesday, October 19, 2004, at the Bradley Center in Milwaukee, Wisconsin. It was also established as a PPV event produced exclusively for wrestlers of the Raw brand. The title not only referred to the day of its scheduling, but also because of its unique theme. Fans had the ability to vote on certain aspects of every match. Because of this, the event was billed as an "interactive pay-per-view". Voting began on October 18 on WWE's official website and concluded during the broadcast.

This would be the first regularly scheduled pay-per-view by WWE on a Tuesday since 1991's This Tuesday in Texas. It was also the first regularly scheduled non-Sunday pay-per-view since the 1994 Survivor Series, as well as the first non-Sunday pay-per-view of any kind since In Your House 8: Beware of Dog 2 in 1996.

=== Storylines ===
Unlike most WWE events, where rules and participants for matches were determined by WWE's creative staff, this was the first event where at least some part of each match was determined by votes from WWE fans conducted on WWE's official website. The event was scheduled to feature eight professional wrestling matches. Various wrestlers were involved in pre-existing scripted feuds, plots and storylines leading to the matches taking place at this event. The event featured wrestlers and other talent from the Raw brand – a storyline division in which WWE assigned its on-air talent to separate television brands.

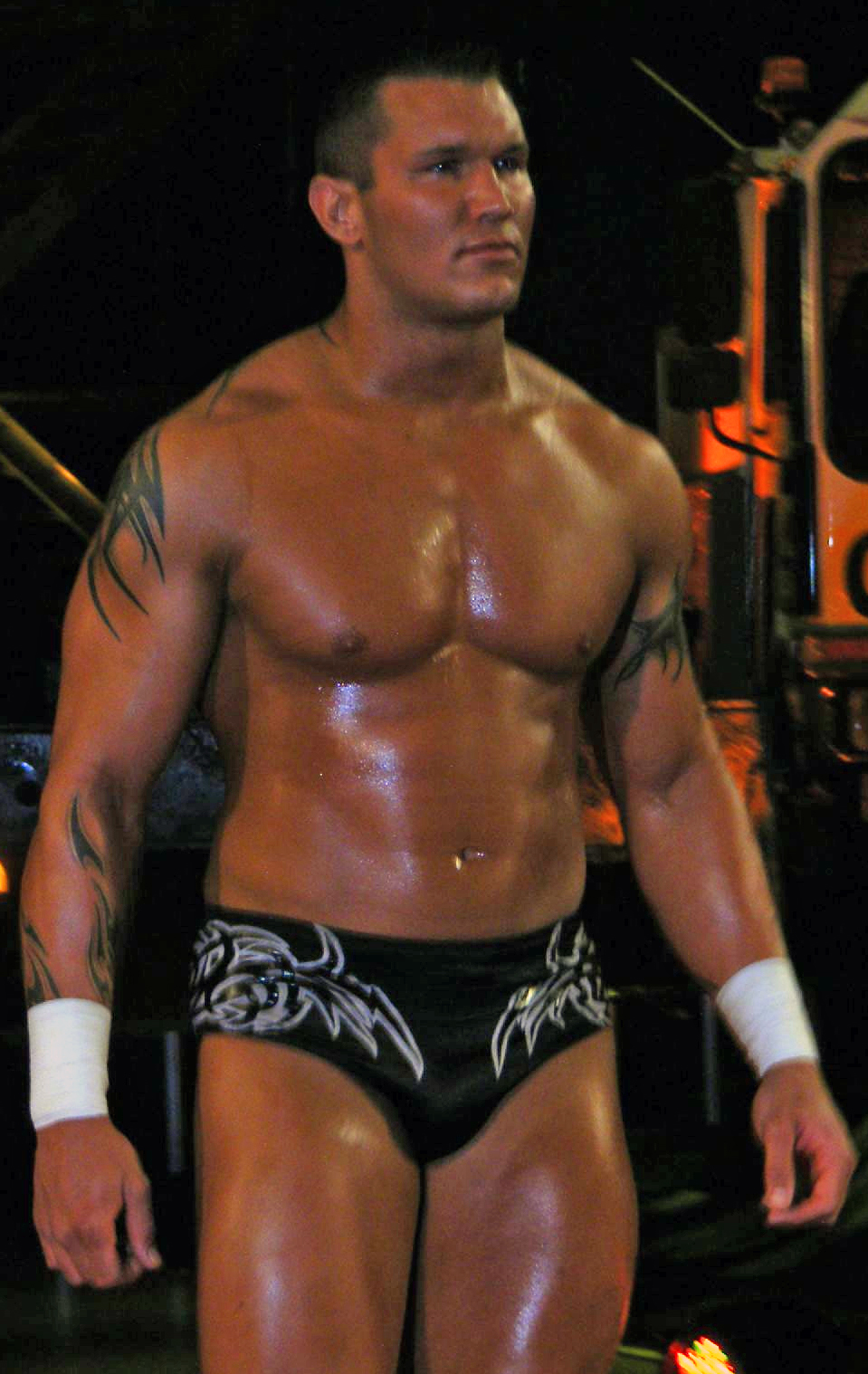
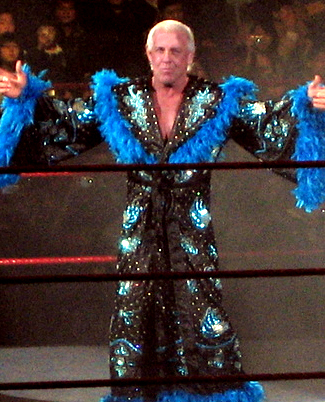
Randy Orton (left) and Ric Flair (right) met in a Steel Cage match at Taboo Tuesday

The main event at Taboo Tuesday was a match between Randy Orton and Ric Flair where the online fan vote would determine whether the match was a steel cage match, a Falls Count Anywhere match, or a submission match. On the September 27 episode of Raw, Orton was given an opportunity to face Triple H at Taboo Tuesday for the World Heavyweight Championship if he was able to win a match against Batista, but he lost due to interference from Flair. This led to Orton blaming his loss on Flair. On the October 4 episode of Raw, Orton commented on everything Flair had accomplished in WWE and criticized him for calling Triple H "the greatest wrestler of all". Flair responded to Orton's comments, asserting that despite Orton's claim of being a "Legend Killer", wrestlers whom he had defeated such as Shawn Michaels and Mick Foley were not truly legends and therefore did not make Orton a true "Legend Killer". Flair also announced that he and Orton would meet in a match at Taboo Tuesday and the fans would have the opportunity to choose what type of match they would compete in.

One of the featured matches on the under-card was contested for the World Heavyweight Championship, in which Triple H would have to defend the title against the fans' choice of three possible opponents: Chris Benoit, Edge, or Shawn Michaels. At Unforgiven, Triple H defeated Randy Orton to capture the World Heavyweight Championship. On the September 13 episode of Raw, Triple H had a celebration thrown in his honor, complete with women, confetti, streamers and a giant cake. Orton, however, sought revenge by coming out of the cake and assaulting the three members of Evolution, Triple H's stable with Ric Flair and Batista, which Orton had previously been a part of. On the October 4 episode of Raw, it was announced that because Orton had lost the opportunity to challenge Triple H, fans would be able to choose between three potential contenders for the World Heavyweight Championship at Taboo Tuesday. Chris Benoit and Edge were revealed as two of the candidates. Shawn Michaels, however, competed in a qualifying match, which saw him defeat Christian, to become the third candidate. On the October 18 episode of Raw, a Triple Threat match was scheduled between Benoit, Edge, and Michaels. Edge won the match after he pinned Benoit by using the ring ropes for leverage. During the match, Michaels legitimately injured his left knee, tearing his meniscus.

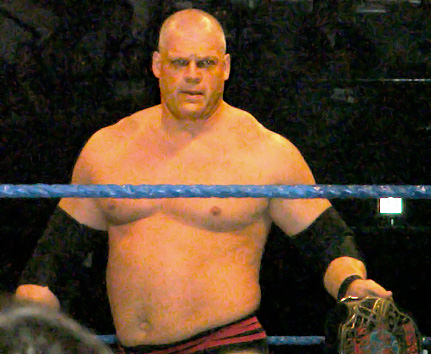
Kane, who faced off against Gene Snitsky at Taboo Tuesday

The other featured preliminary match was between Kane and Gene Snitsky. At Unforgiven, Shawn Michaels defeated Kane in a no disqualification match. On the September 13 episode of Raw, Kane demanded that Raw General Manager Eric Bischoff give him a rematch against Michaels, but Bischoff refused to do so as Michaels was preoccupied with appearing in Chris Jericho's interview segment, The Highlight Reel. Bischoff, however, scheduled Kane in a no disqualification match against an opponent of Bischoff's choice. Kane's opponent was revealed to be Gene Snistky. During the match, Kane's wife, Lita, who was pregnant in the storyline, entered the ring. This led to Kane accidentally falling on top of her after Snitsky hit Kane with a steel chair, ending the match in a draw. Trainers and emergency medical technicians rushed to the scene and took Lita away in an ambulance for medical attention. On the September 20 episode of Raw, Kane was informed by doctors that Lita suffered a scripted miscarriage following the events of the previous week. On the September 27 episode of Raw, in an interview with Todd Grisham, Kane informed Grisham that he sought revenge against Snitsky for his actions. On the October 4 episode of Raw, Lita gave her first interview since the miscarriage and revealed that she and Kane would get payback against Snitsky. During the same episode, Snitsky was interviewed by Raw commentator Jim Ross and told Ross that the death of the couple's unborn child was not his fault. Kane interrupted the interview segment, but Snitsky attacked Kane with a lead pipe in self-defense. This led Bischoff to announce a Weapon of Choice match for Taboo Tuesday, where fans would be able to vote on whether a lead pipe, a steel chain, or a steel chair would be legal for use in the match.

The main Divas feud entering the event was between Christy Hemme and Carmella DeCesare, the two finalists in the Raw Diva Search. On the September 20 episode of Raw, Christy was announced as the winner of the Diva Search and received a one-year contract with WWE and $250,000. After the Diva Search, Carmella turned heel and began a feud with Christy, due to jealousy of Christy winning the Diva Search. On the October 18 episode of Raw, it was announced that Christy and Carmella would face each other at Taboo Tuesday with the fans choosing what type of match they would compete in. The choices were a Lingerie Pillow Fight, an Evening Gown Match, or an Aerobics Challenge. After the announcement was made, Carmella attacked Christy.

== Event ==
Other on-screen personnel
Role:	Name:
English commentators	Jim Ross
English commentators	Jerry Lawler
Spanish commentators	Carlos Cabrera
Spanish commentators	Hugo Savinovich
Backstage Interviewers	Jonathan Coachman
Backstage Interviewers	Todd Grisham
Ring announcer	Lilian Garcia
Referees	Mike Chioda
Referees	Jack Doan
Referees	Chris Kay
Referees	Earl Hebner
Referees	Chad Patton

Before the event went live on pay-per-view, Sgt. Slaughter defeated Muhammad Hassan, who was accompanied by Daivari, by disqualification in a dark match.

=== Preliminary matches ===
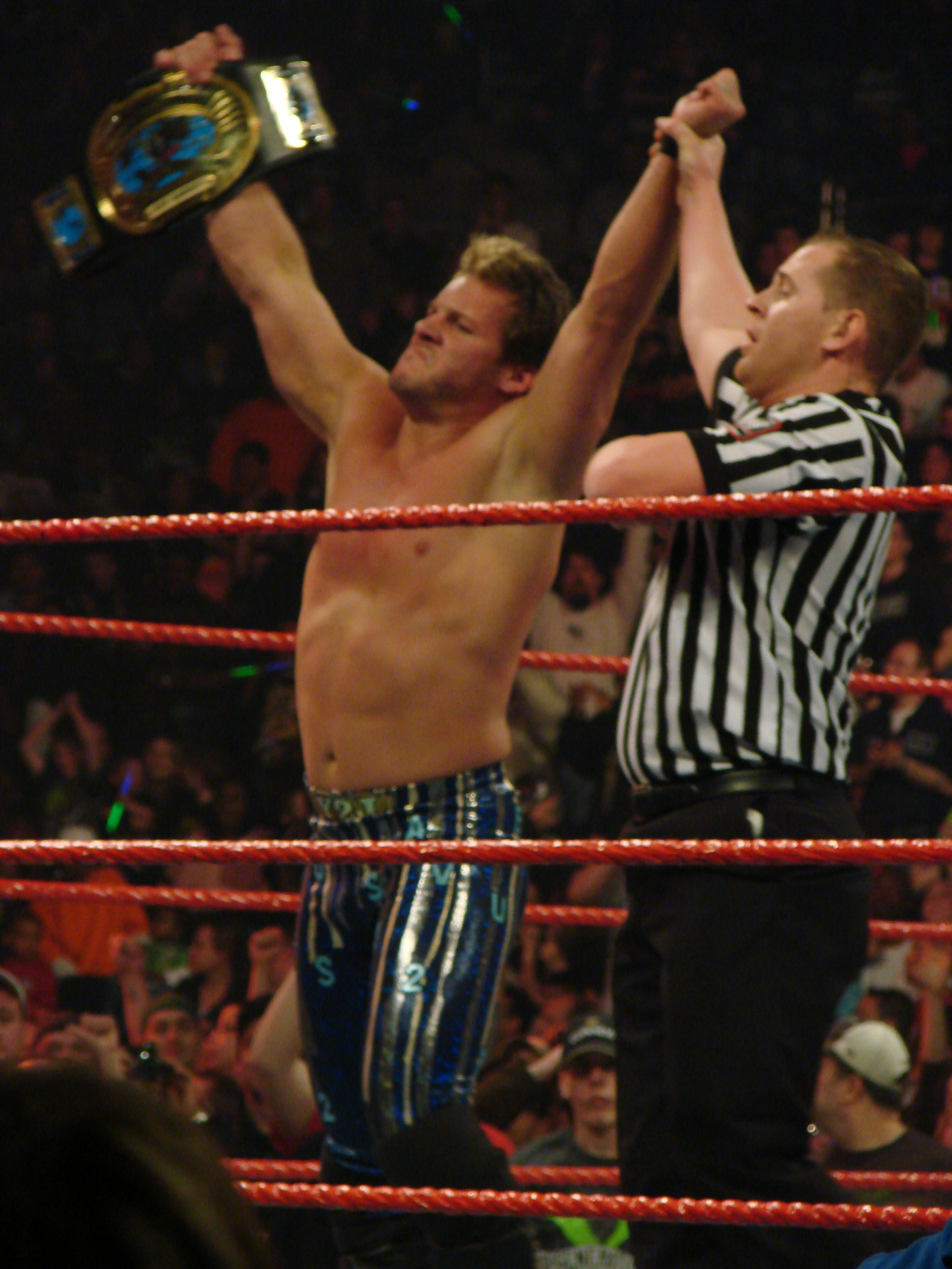
Chris Jericho, who defended the Intercontinental Championship against the fan-voted Shelton Benjamin

The first televised match was for the WWE Intercontinental Championship in which Chris Jericho defended the title against Shelton Benjamin, who won the fans' vote with 37%. The match started off with Jericho performing an enzuigiri. Later in the match, Jericho attempted a bulldog and Lionsault but Benjamin countered. The match ended when Benjamin performed a T-Bone Suplex on Jericho to win the title.

The voting results for Triple H's opponent for the World Heavyweight Championship were then revealed, with Shawn Michaels winning. The next match was a Fulfill Your Fantasy Battle Royal match for the WWE Women's Championship between Molly Holly, Stacy Keibler, Victoria, Gail Kim, Jazz, Nidia, and Trish Stratus. The first to be eliminated was Nidia, which was followed with the elimination of Jazz. Kim attempted a hurricanrana on Victoria but Victoria countered the move as she eliminated Kim. Victoria was eliminated afterwards by Stratus and Molly. Stratus and Molly continued working together, as they got the upper hand over Keibler. Molly eliminated Keibler and Stratus eliminated Molly to retain the title.

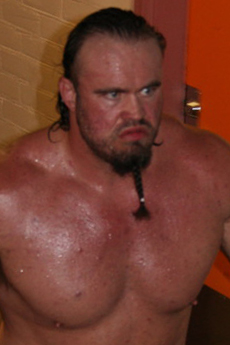
Gene Snitsky faced Kane in a Weapons of Choice match, which was a hardcore match in which fans voted on the weapon to be used; a steel chain won the vote

The third match was between Gene Snitsky and Kane (with Lita). The match was a Weapons of Choice match, for which a steel chain gained 41% of the vote. The match began with Kane using a chain on Snitsky. Snitsky grabbed the chain and choked Kane with it. The match ended when Snitsky came off the second rope and jumped onto a steel chair that was wrapped around Kane's neck and pinned him to win the match.

The next match was between General Manager Eric Bischoff and Eugene in a "Choose the Loser's Fate". Eugene performed a leg drop on Bischoff for the win. After the match ended, the audience voted that Bischoff get his head shaved. Jonathan Coachman, however, announced that the audience instead voted "Loser is Winners Servant", in which he and Bischoff would be Eugene's servants for five minutes. WWE Chairman Vince McMahon came out and reversed the stipulation and announced that Bischoff would get his head shaved. McMahon warned that if Bischoff did not go through it, he would be fired. Eugene shaved Bischoff's hair and Coachman was forced to wear a dress for attempting to interfere in the outcome of the match.

The fifth match was for the World Tag Team Championships between La Résistance (Sylvain Grenier and Robért Conway) against Edge and Chris Benoit, the two individuals who were not chosen to face Triple H for the World Heavyweight Championship. There was back and forth action between the two teams, as all the superstars were able to participate in the match. Edge abandoned Benoit during the match, which forced Benoit to wrestle La Résistance by himself. Benoit fought them off and he was able to get the upper hand over Grenier. The match concluded with Benoit forcing Conway to submit to the Crippler Crossface to win the titles for his team.

The next match was between Christy Hemme and Carmella DeCesare. The match was a Lingerie Pillow Fight, which gained 57% of the fans' vote. During this match, Hemme and DeCesare began hitting each other with pillows while wearing lingerie. The match ended when Hemme pinned DeCesare to win the match.

=== Main event matches ===
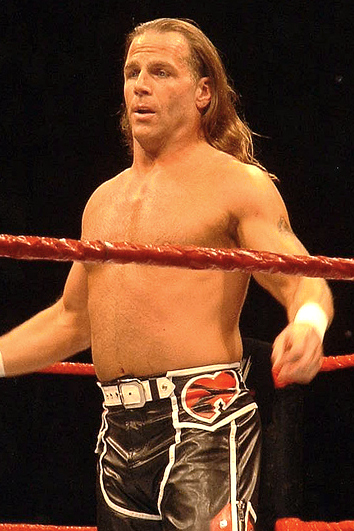
Shawn Michaels, who was voted to face Triple H for the World Heavyweight Championship

The seventh match was the World Heavyweight Championship match, where the fans' chose Shawn Michaels by 39%, to face Triple H for the title. Triple H targeted Michael's injured knee, applying a Figure four leglock on Michaels. Michaels would gain the advantage when he countered a maneuver by Triple H. As Michaels was about to perform Sweet Chin Music on Triple H, Edge interfered in the match and executed a spear on Michaels. Triple H pinned Michaels to retain the title.

In the main event, Randy Orton faced Ric Flair in a steel cage match, which gained 68% of the vote. During the match, both Orton and Flair managed to get the upper hand. A spot in the match saw Flair hit a low blow on Orton and sent him into the cage, causing Orton to bleed. Orton regained the momentum by sending Flair into the cage, resulting in Flair bleeding. The match concluded with Orton performing an RKO for the win. After the match, the two shook hands.

== Reception ==
The Bradley Center had a maximum capacity of 18,000, which was reduced significantly for the event. This event grossed over $215,000 from an approximate attendance of 3,500. It also received 174,000 pay-per-view buys. Taboo Tuesday helped World Wrestling Entertainment earn $24.7 million in revenue from pay-per-view events versus $18.5 million the previous year, which was later confirmed by Linda McMahon on November 23, 2004 in a quarterly result. Canadian Online Explorer's professional wrestling section rated the event five out of ten stars. The rating was lower than the Taboo Tuesday event in 2005, which was rated seven out of ten stars. The Steel cage match was rated a ten out of ten stars. The Lingerie Pillow Fight match was rated zero out of ten stars.

The event was released on DVD on November 23, 2004. The DVD was distributed by the label, Sony Music Entertainment.

== Aftermath ==
Following Taboo Tuesday, Evolution (Triple H, Ric Flair and Batista) were put in charge of Raw, after Eric Bischoff took the night off, following his match the night before. Triple H granted Flair the match of his choice; Flair wanted a rematch against Randy Orton, as he lost a steel cage match to Orton the previous night. Orton accepted Flair's challenge, with a stipulation that if he defeated Flair he would get an opportunity to face Triple H for the World Heavyweight Championship at the November pay-per-view Survivor Series. Orton did not receive the opportunity, as he lost to Flair. On the November 1 episode of Raw, Bischoff scheduled a traditional 8-man elimination tag team match involving Team Orton (Randy Orton, Chris Jericho, Maven and Chris Benoit) facing off against Team Triple H (Triple H, Batista, Edge and Gene Snitsky) at Survivor Series. The winning team would be granted absolute control of running the show for a month, and the winning members would all get a week to be in charge of the program. At the November event, Team Orton defeated Team Triple H and the team were given the opportunity to be in charge of Raw for a week.

On the October 25 episode of Raw, a rematch for the Intercontinental Championship was scheduled between Shelton Benjamin and Chris Jericho. The match saw Benjamin defeat Jericho and retain the title. After the match, Benjamin was attacked by Christian, which led Christian to hit him with the Unprettier. The following week, Bischoff scheduled an Intercontinental championship match between Benjamin and Christian at Survivor Series. At Survivor Series, Benjamin retained the Intercontinental championship.

In November 2004, Lita returned to the women's division. She began a feud with Trish Stratus after Stratus called Lita "chubby" because of her pregnancy weight gain. Lita challenged Stratus to a WWE Women's Championship match at Survivor Series, however, due to the months of humiliation and being verbally berated by Stratus, Lita was more concerned with doing as much damage as possible, leading to her disqualification.

A second Taboo Tuesday was held the following year, thus establishing the interactive PPV as an annual event for the promotion. In 2006, the event was moved to the traditional Sunday nights for PPVs and was in turn renamed as Cyber Sunday. The final event was produced in 2008, as the interactive PPV was replaced by Bragging Rights in 2009.

In 2018, Edge revealed during an interview that he was booked to win the World Heavyweight Championship at the event if he won the poll.

== Results ==
No.	Results	Stipulations	Times
1^{D}	Sgt. Slaughter defeated Muhammad Hassan (with Daivari) by disqualification	Singles match	2:20
2	Shelton Benjamin defeated Chris Jericho (c)	Singles match for the WWE Intercontinental Championship	10:57
3	Trish Stratus (c) won by last eliminating Molly Holly	Fulfill Your Fantasy Battle Royal for the WWE Women's Championship	5:37
4	Gene Snitsky defeated Kane (with Lita)	Weapon of Choice match	14:17
5	Eugene defeated Eric Bischoff	"Choose the Loser's Fate" match	2:11
6	Edge and Chris Benoit defeated La Résistance (Sylvain Grenier and Robért Conway) (c)	Tag team match for the World Tag Team Championship	16:15
7	Christy Hemme defeated Carmella	Lingerie Pillow Fight	1:48
8	Triple H (c) defeated Shawn Michaels	Singles match for the World Heavyweight Championship	14:05
9	Randy Orton defeated Ric Flair	Steel Cage match	10:35
(c) / – the champion(s) heading into the match; D / – this was a dark match

=== Battle royal eliminations ===
Elimination	Wrestler	Eliminated by	Time
1	Nidia	Jazz	00:37
2	Jazz	Victoria	00:59
3	Gail Kim	Victoria	01:23
4	Victoria	Trish Stratus and Molly Holly	03:36
5	Stacy Keibler	Molly Holly	05:27
6	Molly Holly	Trish Stratus	05:37
Winner:	Trish Stratus		

=== Voting results ===
Poll	Results
Opponent for Chris Jericho	Shelton Benjamin (37.48%); Batista (20.11%); Jonathan Coachman (7.01%); Christian (6.69%); Rhyno (5.77%); Maven (4.23%); William Regal (3.81%); The Hurricane (3.77%); Tyson Tomko (2.49%); Tajiri (2.36%); Steven Richards (2.24%); Val Venis (1.69%); Rosey (1.10%); Chuck Palumbo (0.68%); Rodney Mack (0.58%)
Outfit for the Fulfill Your Fantasy Diva Battle Royal	School girl (53.10%); French maid (30.03%); Nurse outfit (16.87%)
Weapon for the Weapon of Choice match	Chain (40.84%); Steel chair (29.93%); Lead pipe (29.24%)
Stipulations for Eugene versus Eric Bischoff	Loser has to have their head shaved (58.73%); Loser has to wear a dress (20.77%); Loser has to be the winner's servant (20.50%)
Stipulations for Christy Hemme versus Carmella	Lingerie Pillow Fight (56.48%); Evening Gown match (33.22%); Aerobics Challenge (10.30%)
Opponent for Triple H	Shawn Michaels (38.72%); Edge (33.42%); Chris Benoit (27.86%)
Stipulations for Randy Orton versus Ric Flair	Steel cage match (68%); Falls Count Anywhere (20%); Submission match (12%)
