= Survivor Series (2007) =

World Wrestling Entertainment pay-per-view event

- Promotional poster featuring Edge
- Promotion: World Wrestling Entertainment
- Brand(s): Raw; SmackDown! ECW
- Date: November 18, 2007
- City: Miami, Florida
- Venue: American Airlines Arena
- Attendance: 12,500
- Buy rate: 341,000
- Tagline: Edge Is Back. And He's Just A Little Bitter.

Pay-per-view chronology
← Previous; Cyber Sunday	Next → Armageddon

Survivor Series chronology
← Previous; 2006	Next → 2008

The 2007 Survivor Series was a professional wrestling pay-per-view (PPV) event produced by World Wrestling Entertainment (WWE). It was the 21st annual Survivor Series and took place on November 18, 2007, at the American Airlines Arena in Miami, Florida, held for wrestlers from the promotion's Raw, SmackDown!, and ECW brand divisions. The event was highlighted by the titular Survivor Series match, a tag team elimination match that pits teams of multiple wrestlers against each other.

The main event featured SmackDown! wrestlers in a Hell in a Cell match in which World Heavyweight Champion Batista defeated The Undertaker to retain his title. In Raw's main match, Randy Orton defeated Shawn Michaels in a singles match to retain the WWE Championship, while in ECW's prime match, ECW Champion CM Punk defeated John Morrison and The Miz in a triple threat match to retain the title. Two matches were on the undercard. The first was a singles match, in which The Great Khali defeated Hornswoggle. The other was the only Survivor Series match on the card which was an interpromotional match that featured Team Triple H (Triple H, Jeff Hardy, Rey Mysterio, and Kane) defeating Team Umaga (Umaga, Mr. Kennedy, Montel Vontavious Porter, Finlay, and Big Daddy V).

Survivor Series helped WWE increase its pay-per-view revenue by US$1.2 million, through ticket sales and pay-per-view buys. It received mixed critical reviews by various independent sources, including Canadian Online Explorer and Pro Wrestling Torch. After its release on DVD, the event peaked at number five on Billboard's Video Sales chart, before it fell off the chart after 10 weeks.

== Production ==
=== Background ===
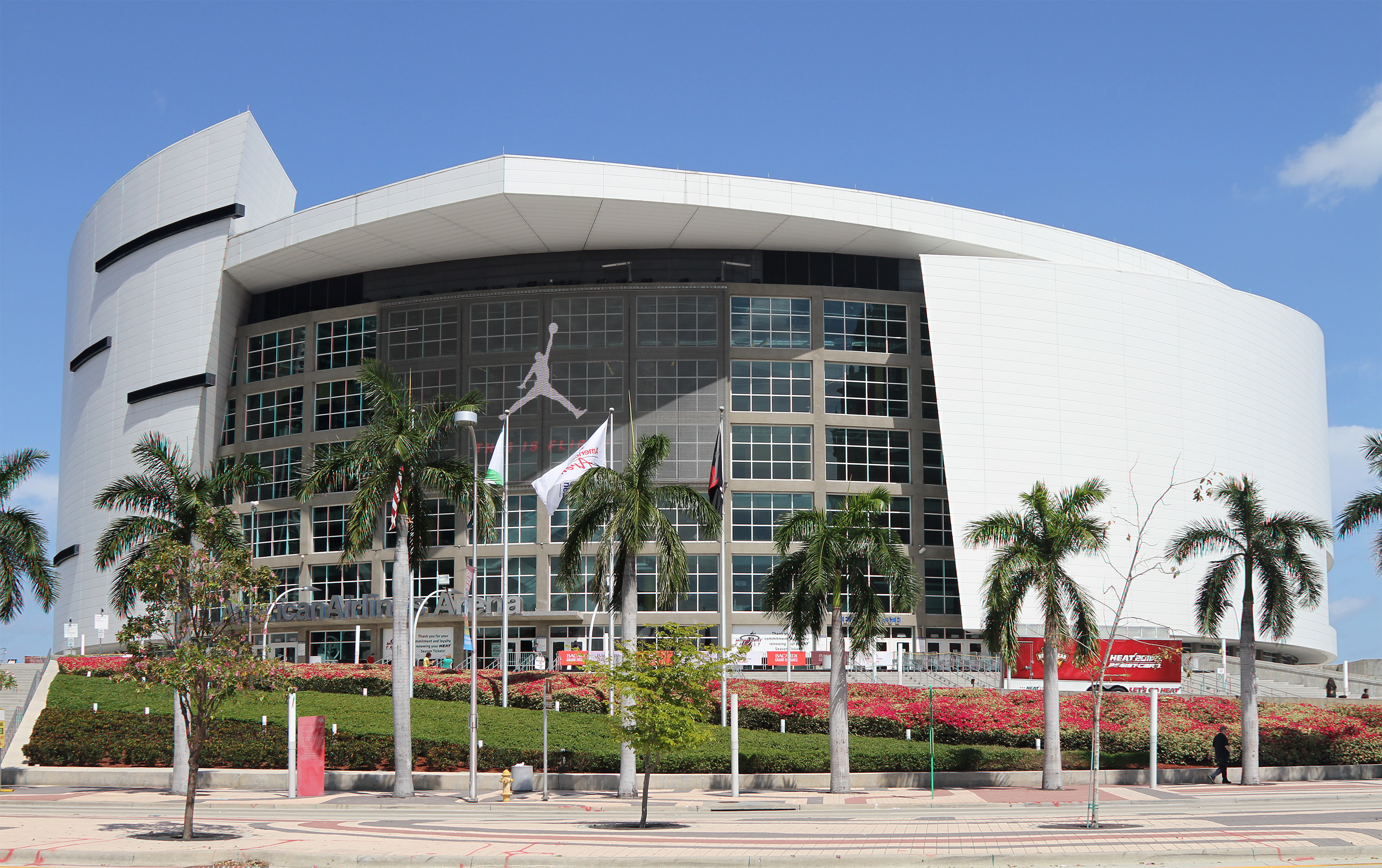
The 21st annual Survivor Series was held at the American Airlines Arena in Miami, Florida.

Survivor Series is an annual professional wrestling pay-per-view (PPV) event, produced every November by World Wrestling Entertainment (WWE) since 1987, generally held around Thanksgiving in the United States. In what has become the second longest-running pay-per-view event in history (behind WWE's WrestleMania), it is one of the promotion's original four pay-per-views, along with WrestleMania, SummerSlam, and Royal Rumble, referred to as the "Big Four". The event is traditionally characterized by having Survivor Series matches, which are tag team elimination matches that typically pits teams of four or five wrestlers against each other. The 21st Survivor Series was scheduled to be held on November 18, 2007, at the American Airlines Arena in Miami, Florida, and featured wrestlers from the Raw, SmackDown!, and ECW brand divisions. Tickets went on sale on April 21.

=== Storylines ===
Survivor Series was the culmination of various scripted plots and storylines. For three months before the event, several professional wrestling matches and scripted plots were played out on WWE's programming—Raw, SmackDown!, and ECW—to create feuds between various wrestlers, casting them as heroes and villains.

The main narrative for Survivor Series from the SmackDown! brand continued the events that unfolded at WrestleMania 23 in which The Undertaker defeated Batista for the World Heavyweight Championship. Over the course of several months, the two wrestlers fought in various matches over the title, which eventually involved Edge. The Undertaker was injured in one of these matches on the May 11 episode of SmackDown!, in which Edge had won the title after cashing in his Money in the Bank contract to defeat The Undertaker. During The Undertaker's absence, Edge was legitimately injured and vacated the championship, and The Great Khali won the vacant championship in a Battle Royal. At Unforgiven, Batista won the World Heavyweight Championship from Khali, and The Undertaker returned from his injury and defeated Mark Henry. Afterwards, the original feud between the two wrestlers was restarted and culminated into a singles match for the title at Cyber Sunday; Batista won this match and retained his title. On the November 2 episode of SmackDown!, a rematch was booked in a Hell in a Cell match at Survivor Series.

The prime rivalry from the Raw brand continued a storyline that extended from Cyber Sunday, between WWE Champion Randy Orton and Shawn Michaels over Orton's title. At Cyber Sunday, Michaels was chosen by WWE fans, via online voting, to face Orton for the title, though, Orton retained his title via disqualification. A rematch was promoted for Survivor Series on the October 29 episode of Raw, in which Michaels would face Orton for his title. Afterwards, Michaels and Orton fought in different match types over the weeks leading to Survivor Series. On the episode of Raw before Survivor Series, Michaels and Orton met "Face to Face", in which Orton attacked Michaels.

The prime storyline on the ECW brand featured ECW Champion CM Punk, John Morrison, and The Miz. Morrison and Punk's rivalry revolved over the outcome of their match at Vengeance: Night of Champions, in which Morrison (then known as Johnny Nitro) defeated Punk to win the vacant title. Punk sought revenge, but Morrison defeated Punk in two championship matches at The Great American Bash and SummerSlam; however, Punk won the title from Morrison on the September 4 episode of ECW. At Cyber Sunday, The Miz was voted online by fans to challenge Punk for the ECW Championship, though, Punk defeated The Miz to retain his title. A triple threat match was announced for Survivor Series on the November 13 episode of ECW, in which Punk would defend his title against Morrison and The Miz in a triple threat match.

In a narrative extending to the September 10 episode of Raw, in which Hornswoggle, a dwarf, was announced as Vince McMahon's illegitimate son. In this storyline, McMahon did not like the fact that Hornswoggle was his son, and as a result, he promoted matches in which Hornswoggle faced much larger opponents. As part of this storyline, McMahon announced that The Great Khali would face Hornswoggle at Survivor Series. In a promotional in-ring segment on the episode of SmackDown! before the pay-per-view event, Khali and Hornswoggle weighed in for their match, in which Khali weighed double the weight of Hornswoggle; this was a segment created by McMahon to humiliate his son. The event included an inter-brand 5-on-5 Survivor Series elimination tag team match. Announced via WWE.com, WWE's official website, Team Triple H (Triple H, The Hardy Boyz (Matt Hardy and Jeff Hardy), Rey Mysterio, and Kane) would face Team Umaga (Umaga, Montel Vontavious Porter (MVP), Finlay, Big Daddy V, and Mr. Kennedy).

== Event ==
Other on-screen personnel
Role:	Name:
English commentators	Jim Ross (Raw)
English commentators	Jerry Lawler (Raw)
English commentators	Michael Cole (Smackdown!)
English commentators	John "Bradshaw" Layfield (Smackdown!)
English commentators	Joey Styles (ECW)
English commentators	Tazz (ECW)
Spanish commentators	Carlos Cabrera
Spanish commentators	Hugo Savinovich
Interviewers	Todd Grisham
Interviewers	Anastasia Rose
Ring announcers	Lilian Garcia (Raw)
Ring announcers	Justin Roberts (SmackDown)
Ring announcers	Tony Chimel (ECW)
Referees	Scott Armstrong (ECW)
Referees	Mike Chioda (Raw)
Referees	John Cone (Raw)
Referees	Marty Elias (Raw)
Referees	Mickie Henson (SmackDown)
Referees	Jim Korderas (SmackDown!)
Referees	Chad Patton (Raw)
Referees	Charles Robinson (SmackDown!)

=== Preliminary matches ===
The pay-per-view began with CM Punk defending the ECW Championship against John Morrison and The Miz in a triple threat match. Throughout the match, The Miz and Morrison double-teamed Punk, however, The Miz turned on Morrison by attacking him. After The Miz threw Morrison out of the ring, Punk performed a Go To Sleep on The Miz to retain the ECW Championship.

The next scheduled match was an inter-brand 10-Diva tag team match, in which the team of Kelly Kelly, Torrie Wilson, Mickie James, Maria, and Michelle McCool faced Victoria, Beth Phoenix, Melina, Layla, and Jillian Hall. Phoenix's team had the advantage over James' team, until James was tagged into the match. She delivered a Clothesline and a Long Kiss Goodnight to Melina to earn the victory for her team.

Next was a tag team match for the World Tag Team Championship, in which the champions, Lance Cade and Trevor Murdoch defended against Hardcore Holly and Cody Rhodes. At one point, Holly performed a Clothesline on Cade, and sent Cade and himself onto ringside. In the ring, Murdoch performed the "Ace of Spades" on Rhodes to retain the World Tag Team Championship for his team.

The fourth match was the five-on-four Survivor Series Elimination Tag team match between Team Triple H (Triple H, Jeff Hardy, Rey Mysterio, and Kane) and Team Umaga (Umaga, Mr. Kennedy, MVP, Finlay, and Big Daddy V). Before the event, it was announced that Matt Hardy would be unable to compete in the match due to a scripted injury. Kane was the first wrestler eliminated after an elbow drop by Big Daddy V. Umaga then eliminated Mysterio after the "Samoan Spike. MVP was eliminated by Hardy after a Twist of Fate. Kennedy was eliminated by Triple H after Big Daddy V accidentally performed an elbow drop on Kennedy. Big Daddy V was eliminated after Hardy and Triple H performed a Double DDT. Finlay and Umaga were then eliminated after a "Pedigree" to Finlay, and a "Swanton" to Umaga. As a result, Team Triple H won.

The Great Khali faced Hornswoggle in the next scheduled match. At one point, Hornswoggle tried to hit Khali with a shillelagh, but Khali slapped Hornswoggle down to the mat. The match ended via disqualification, after Finlay, Hornswoggle's original caretaker, entered the ring and hit Khali in the head with his own shillelagh and Finlay turned face.

=== Main event matches ===
The sixth match was Randy Orton defending the WWE Championship against Shawn Michaels. In the match, Michaels was banned from using "Sweet Chin Music", and if Orton got disqualified, he would lose the title. Had Michaels used Sweet Chin Music, he would have never been allowed to challenge for the title again as long as Orton was champion. Michaels attempted various submission moves, such as the Sharpshooter, Crossface, and ankle lock. Eventually, Michaels attempted to perform Sweet Chin Music but to prevent himself from losing the match, he stopped, which then allowed Orton to perform an RKO to retain the WWE Championship.

The main event was Batista defending the World Heavyweight Championship against The Undertaker in a Hell in a Cell match. At one point, Batista performed a Batista Bomb through a table on The Undertaker for a near-fall. The Undertaker then performed a Tombstone Piledriver on Batista for a near-fall. The Undertaker then performed another Tombstone Piledriver on top of the steel steps and pinned Batista, but as the referee counted the pin, Edge, dressed as a cameraman, pulled the referee out of the ring, and hit The Undertaker with the camera he was holding and then positioned The Undertaker's head on top of the steel steps. Edge then slammed a folding chair onto The Undertaker's head. While the referee re-entered the ring, Edge dragged Batista onto The Undertaker, and as a result, Batista pinned The Undertaker to retain the World Heavyweight Championship. After the match, Edge came back into the ring and hit The Undertaker with a chair as he was sitting up.

== Reception ==
The American Airlines Arena usually has a capacity of 19,600, which was reduced for Survivor Series due to production purposes. From an approximate attendance of 12,000 and 341,000 pay-per-view buys, Survivor Series helped WWE earn $19.9 million in pay-per-view revenue versus $18.7 million the previous year; this was confirmed by WWE in its 2007 fourth quarter financial report. Although Survivor Series helped WWE's revenue, it earned 42,000 less buys than the previous year's Survivor Series.

In addition, the pay-per-view received mixed reviews. Dale Plummer and Nick Tylwalk of Canadian Online Explorer's SLAM! Sports – Wrestling rated the entire event 7.5 out of 10 points. They also rated Raw and SmackDown's main event an 8 out of 10 points. J.D. Dunn of 411Mania stated that the event was "The best WWE PPV since Backlash." Wade Keller of the Pro Wrestling Torch, a professional wrestling newsletter operated since 1987, reported that the main event was "disappointing" and that "WWE set expectations too high for the Cell." He rated the Raw main event 3 out of 5 points, while rating the SmackDown main event 2.25 out of 5 points. Survivor Series was released on DVD on December 26, 2007, by WWE Home Video, and it was distributed by Genius Products. The DVD debuted on Billboard's Video Sales chart on January 19, 2008, at number five. It spent nine more weeks on the chart, before it fell off the chart at number 20.

== Aftermath ==
After Survivor Series, Randy Orton was scripted into a feud with Chris Jericho, who made his return to WWE after a two-year hiatus. The following night on Raw, the evolving feud culminated into a match being promoted for Armageddon, WWE's December pay-per-view. At Armageddon, Orton retained his WWE Championship when he was disqualified after John "Bradshaw" Layfield (JBL) interfered and attacked Jericho. After Batista retained his World Heavyweight Championship, Edge was scripted into a rivalry with him over his title. Eventually, The Undertaker was also placed in the feud, which led to the advertising of a Triple Threat match at Armageddon for the title. At Armageddon, Edge won the World Heavyweight Championship. Due to the events that occurred at Survivor Series, a match was announced between Finlay and The Great Khali for Armageddon. Finlay prevailed at Armageddon via pinning The Great Khali. After surviving their Elimination tag team match, Triple H and Jeff Hardy were promoted into a match for Armageddon, in which the winner would win the opportunity to challenge for the WWE Championship. At Armageddon, Hardy defeated Triple H. Because Beth Phoenix and Mickie James were the leaders of their teams at Survivor Series, a feud evolved from this, which culminated into a match at Armageddon over Phoenix's WWE Women's Championship. Phoenix retained her title at Armageddon.

== Results ==
No.	Results	Stipulations	Times
1	CM Punk (c) defeated John Morrison and The Miz by pinfall	Triple threat match for the ECW Championship	7:56
2	Kelly Kelly, Maria, Michelle McCool, Mickie James and Torrie Wilson defeated Beth Phoenix, Jillian Hall, Layla, Melina and Victoria	10-Diva tag team match	4:42
3	Lance Cade and Trevor Murdoch (c) defeated Cody Rhodes and Hardcore Holly by pinfall	Tag team match for the World Tag Team Championship	7:18
4	Team Triple H (Triple H, Jeff Hardy, Kane and Rey Mysterio) defeated Team Umaga (Umaga, Big Daddy V, Finlay, Mr. Kennedy and MVP) (with Matt Striker)	Handicap 4-on-5 Survivor Series match	22:08
5	The Great Khali (with Ranjin Singh) defeated Hornswoggle (with Mr. McMahon and Shane McMahon) by disqualification	Singles match	3:16
6	Randy Orton (c) defeated Shawn Michaels by pinfall	Singles match for the WWE Championship; If Michaels had used Sweet Chin Music, he would have been disqualified and would not get another title match while Orton was champion. If Orton had been disqualified, he would have lost the title to Michaels.	17:48
7	Batista (c) defeated The Undertaker by pinfall	Hell in a Cell match for the World Heavyweight Championship	21:24
(c) / – the champion(s) heading into the match

=== Survivor Series match ===
Eliminated	Wrestler	Eliminated by	Method	Time
1	Kane	Big Daddy V	Pinfall	05:25
2	Rey Mysterio	Umaga	Pinfall	09:14
3	MVP	Jeff Hardy	Pinfall	12:49
4	Mr. Kennedy	Triple H	Pinfall	14:20
5	Big Daddy V	Triple H	Pinfall	15:24
6	Finlay	Triple H	Pinfall	21:14
7	Umaga	Jeff Hardy	Pinfall	22:08
Survivor(s):	Jeff Hardy and Triple H (Team Triple H)			22:08
