= Bragging Rights (2010) =

World Wrestling Entertainment pay-per-view event

- Promotional poster featuring various WWE wrestlers
- Promotion: World Wrestling Entertainment
- Brand(s): Raw; SmackDown
- Date: October 24, 2010
- City: Minneapolis, Minnesota
- Venue: Target Center
- Attendance: 9,000
- Buy rate: 137,000

Pay-per-view chronology
← Previous; Hell in a Cell	Next → Survivor Series

Bragging Rights chronology
← Previous; 2009	Next → Final

The 2010 Bragging Rights was a professional wrestling pay-per-view (PPV) event produced by World Wrestling Entertainment (WWE). It was the second annual and final Bragging Rights and took place on October 24, 2010, at the Target Center in Minneapolis, Minnesota, held for wrestlers from the promotion's Raw and SmackDown brand divisions. The concept of the event was based around an interpromotional match for "bragging rights" between wrestlers from the Raw and SmackDown brands with the winning brand receiving the Bragging Rights Trophy.

Seven matches were contested at the event, with one dark match held before event went live on pay-per-view. In the main event, Wade Barrett defeated defending champion Randy Orton by disqualification, but did not win Raw's WWE Championship as titles do not change hands by disqualification unless stipulated; the match also had a stipulation where if Barrett had lost, John Cena would have been fired (in storyline). In another main match on the card, Kane defeated The Undertaker in a Buried Alive match to retain SmackDown's World Heavyweight Championship. While the 2009 event had featured a series of interpromotional matches in which the Bragging Rights Trophy was awarded to the brand that won the most matches, the 2010 event instead had one singular match for the trophy. It was a 14-man elimination tag team match where Team SmackDown defeated Team Raw to give SmackDown its second Bragging Rights Trophy.

The event received 137,000 pay-per-view buys, down from the 181,000 of the previous year. As a result of the first brand split being dissolved in August 2011, Bragging Rights was discontinued and replaced by a reinstated Vengeance that year. With the discontinuation of Bragging Rights, the SmackDown brand was the only winner of the Bragging Rights Trophy. After the brand split was reinstated in 2016, WWE reintroduced a similar brand competition concept for its annual Survivor Series event from 2016 to 2021.

== Production ==
=== Background ===
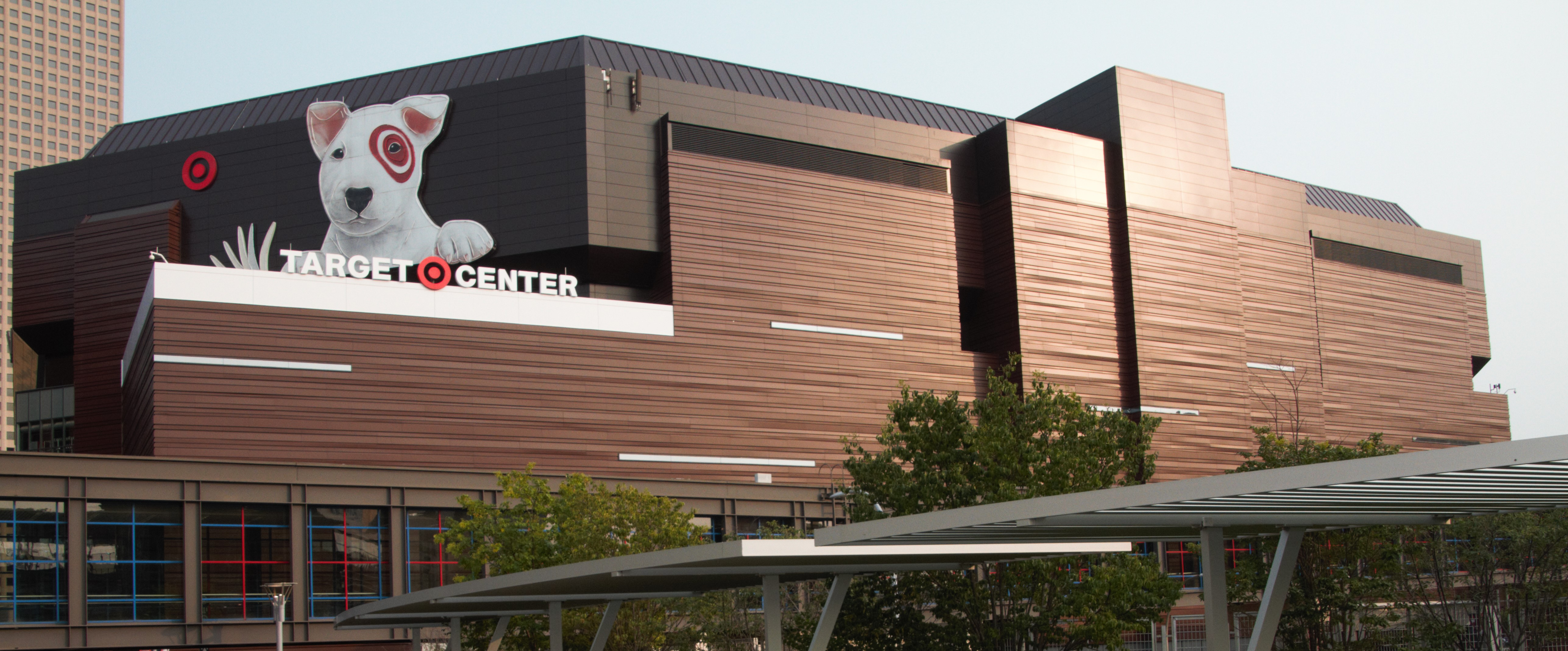
The second annual Bragging Rights was held at the Target Center in Minneapolis, Minnesota.

In 2009, World Wrestling Entertainment (WWE) held a professional wrestling pay-per-view (PPV) event titled Bragging Rights. The concept of the show was based around a series of interpromotional matches for "bragging rights" between wrestlers of the Raw and SmackDown brands, with a Bragging Rights Trophy awarded to the brand that won the most matches out of the series. A second Bragging Rights event was scheduled to be held on October 24, 2010, at the Target Center in Minneapolis, Minnesota. Instead of a series of matches, however, the 2010 event had one singular match for the Bragging Rights Trophy, which was a 14-man elimination tag team match between Team Raw and Team SmackDown.

=== Storylines ===
Bragging Rights featured professional wrestling matches involving different wrestlers from pre-existing scripted feuds, plots, and storylines that were played out on WWE's weekly television programs, Raw and SmackDown.

On the October 8 episode of SmackDown, Big Show was named the captain of Team SmackDown. On the October 11 episode of Raw, six of the seven members of Team Raw qualified through winning matches, all of which included John Morrison, R-Truth, Santino Marella, Sheamus, the recently traded CM Punk and the team captain The Miz. Following that, SmackDown also held qualification matches adding Rey Mysterio, Jack Swagger, Alberto Del Rio, Kofi Kingston, and the recently traded Edge. Hoping to prove himself, Kaval challenged the Big Show to earn a spot on Team SmackDown, Big Show stated that Kaval wouldn't last five minutes in the ring with him and accepted a five-minute challenge. Kaval lasted the five minutes and earned a spot on Team SmackDown only to lose to Tyler Reks right after and lost his spot to him. On the October 18 episode of Raw, The Miz completed Team Raw by adding the returning Ezekiel Jackson as the seventh member of Team Raw.

The main rivalry from Raw involved Randy Orton against Nexus leader Wade Barrett in a match for Orton's WWE Championship, which included newly inducted Nexus member John Cena in Barrett's corner. The previous month at the Hell in a Cell pay-per-view, Cena lost a match to Barrett, due to interference by Husky Harris and Michael McGillicutty, under the stipulation that Cena would join the Nexus upon losing. While attempting to destroy the Nexus from the inside, the Raw General Manager forced Cena to follow Barrett's orders because of the stipulations of the match or he would fire Cena. During a battle royal to determine the next number one contender to face Orton, Cena, Barrett and the other members of the Nexus worked together to eliminate the other Raw Superstars, until only Cena and Barrett were left, Barrett ultimately won when he forced Cena to eliminate himself, thus making Barrett the number one contender. Upon winning, Barrett forced Cena to be in his corner during the match to ensure that Barrett wins the match.

Another rivalry from Raw was that of Dolph Ziggler and Daniel Bryan. On the October 18 episode of Raw, Bryan challenged Ziggler to an interpromotional match at Bragging Rights. Ziggler accepted the challenge and the match was made official. It was announced that the match would be non-title, with Ziggler being the Intercontinental Champion and Bryan being the United States Champion.

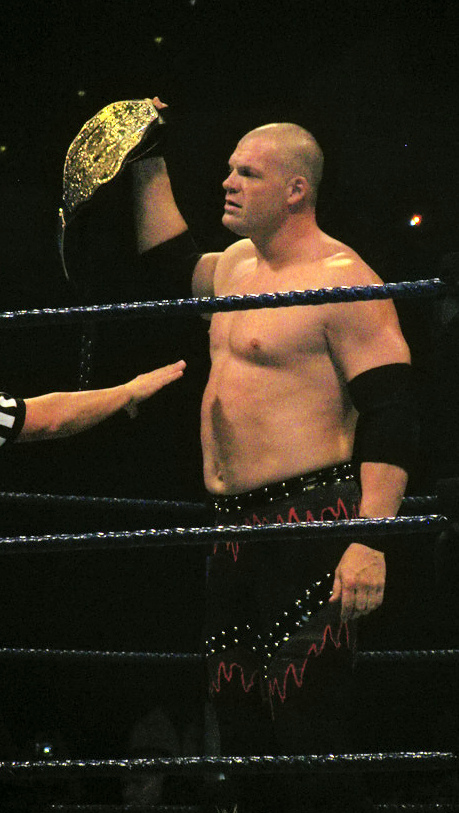
Kane defended SmackDown's World Heavyweight Championship against The Undertaker in a Buried Alive match at Bragging Rights

The main rivalry from SmackDown involved Kane against his (kayfabe) half-brother The Undertaker in a Buried Alive match for Kane's World Heavyweight Championship. At Hell in a Cell, Paul Bearer, who was with The Undertaker during the Hell in a Cell match against Kane, betrayed The Undertaker giving the victory to Kane once again. Two weeks later on SmackDown, Bearer issued one more challenge to The Undertaker in a Buried Alive match. Later that night, The Undertaker accepted the match and taunted Kane with his own pyrotechnics.

Another rivalry from SmackDown revolved around the Divas Championship. Michelle McCool and Layla were the self professed "Co-Divas Champions" heading into the event, where one of them would face challenger Natalya. It was announced on the October 22 episode of SmackDown that Layla would be the one to face Natalya at Bragging Rights, with the Divas Championship on the line.

== Event ==
Other on-screen personnel
Role:	Name:
English commentators	Michael Cole
English commentators	Jerry Lawler
English commentators	Matt Striker
Spanish commentators	Carlos Cabrera
Spanish commentators	Hugo Savinovich
Interviewer	Josh Matthews
Ring announcers	Justin Roberts
Ring announcers	Tony Chimel
Referees	Mike Chioda
Referees	Charles Robinson
Referees	John Cone
Referees	Justin King
Referees	Chad Patton

Prior to Bragging Rights airing, an untelevised match took place between Montel Vontavious Porter and Chavo Guerrero Jr., which Porter won.

=== Preliminary matches ===
The first match aired was between Dolph Ziggler and Daniel Bryan in an inter-promotional singles match. Bryan dominated the match early on, before the pair traded control of the match. Following a series of near-falls, Ziggler earned a three-count. As Bryan's feet were on the ropes, however, the match continued. The two traded moves and near falls until Bryan forced Ziggler to submit to his LeBell Lock hold (an omoplata crossface). Immediately after the match ended, Vickie Guerrero entered the ring and started arguing with the referee about Ziggler's loss due to the fact that during the match, he had earned a three count and the referee did not see Bryan's foot on the ropes and decided to continue the match. The referee proceeded to symbolically eject Vickie and then Ziggler as he engaged in the argument with Vickie.

The second contest of the evening was an impromptu tag team match, with the WWE Tag Team Championship on the line. Wade Barrett announced that David Otunga and John Cena were to face champions Cody Rhodes and Drew McIntyre. Otunga and Rhodes started the match, and Rhodes gained control. Rhodes and McIntyre utilised quick tags to keep control and earn a near-fall before Otunga tagged in Cena. Rhodes submitted to Cena's STF hold to end the match, and make Cena and Otunga the new champions. Following the match, Cena attacked Otunga and left with both championship belts.

The third match was also impromptu and had not been advertised prior to the event. Ted DiBiase Jr. and Goldust faced off in a singles match, revolving around Goldust stealing the Million Dollar Championship from DiBiase a few weeks prior to the event. The match ended when Goldust was distracted by Maryse and Aksana fighting outside the ring, and pinned by DiBiase.

The next match was for the Divas Championship between champion Layla and challenger Natalya. Natalya dominated the first part of the match until Layla managed to counter. Michelle McCool, Layla's tag team partner, interfered in the match on multiple occasions, and helped Layla to win the contest by pinfall.

=== Main event matches ===
The fifth contest of the evening was the Buried Alive match between Kane and The Undertaker, with Kane's World Heavyweight Championship on the line. The match started with both men brawling on the entrance ramp, at ringside, and into the audience, before they entered the ring. Kane took control after using a steel chair, and dragged The Undertaker out of the ring and up to the burial site, located at the side of the entrance ramp. The Undertaker regained control by using his Hell's Gate gogoplata submission hold. The Undertaker was distracted by Paul Bearer, and then The Nexus interfered in the match, attacking The Undertaker and beginning to fill the grave with dirt, before Kane scared them off. Kane hit The Undertaker with an urn, causing him to fall into the grave, and then used a digger to fill the grave and win the match. This was Undertaker's last pay-per-view match outside of WrestleMania, until 2015's SummerSlam, and ended his status as a full-time wrestler.

The sixth match was the seven-on-seven elimination tag team match between Team Raw and Team SmackDown. Santino Marella was the first eliminated from Team Raw, when he was pinned by Tyler Reks. Sheamus eliminated SmackDown's Kofi Kingston. In the course of the match, Alberto Del Rio attacked his own teammate Rey Mysterio, and Mysterio was escorted to the back by medical personnel. John Morrison eliminated Jack Swagger and Sheamus eliminated Reks giving Team Raw a six-three advantage. Big Show and Sheamus fought outside the ring, which led to both men being counted out. Edge eliminated R-Truth and Morrison in quick succession, but CM Punk eliminated Del Rio, leaving Edge as the only member of Team SmackDown. Mysterio, who was never officially eliminated, returned to the match and rejoined Team SmackDown. Mysterio quickly pinned Punk and Jackson, leaving The Miz as the only wrestler remaining on Team Raw. Alex Riley, The Miz's protege, prevented Mysterio from performing his finishing move on The Miz, but Edge performed a Spear on The Miz. Edge pinned The Miz to win the match for Team SmackDown.

The seventh and final contest of the night was for the WWE Championship between champion Randy Orton and challenger Wade Barrett, who was accompanied by John Cena. The stipulation is if Barrett lose the match Cena would be fired. Orton took initial control of the match, but Barrett was able to gain some control before Cena caused a distraction allowing Orton to regain control. On the outside of the ring, Barrett sent Orton shoulder first into the steel steps, allowing Barrett to take control of the match. The Nexus interfered and attacked Orton while the referee was down, until Cena stopped them, telling Barrett he did it to stop Barrett from being disqualified. Following Orton regaining control, Cena attacked Barrett causing Barrett to win by disqualification. Orton retained the championship, but as Barrett won the match, Cena retained his job. Following the match, Orton attacked both Cena and Barrett to end the event.

== Reception ==
Bragging Rights received 137,000 pay-per-view buys, a decrease from the 181,000 garnered by the 2009 event of the same name; this represented a decline of 24% and contributed to a $2.5 million decline in pay-per-view revenue in the fourth quarter of 2010 for WWE. Overall the event was positively received, with the Bryan vs Ziggler and Team SmackDown vs Team Raw matches being particularly praised.

== Aftermath ==
=== Raw ===
Following this event, The Undertaker would start to wrestle only part-time through the year for the rest of his career. After vignettes started airing from the January 31, 2011, episode of Raw with the date 2-21-11 burned into the screen, The Undertaker returned on the February 21 episode. After Undertaker entered the ring, Triple H also returned that night and confronted him, where the two engaged in a non-verbal stare-down before looking at the WrestleMania XXVII sign, signaling a challenge between the two at the event which was later confirmed four days later on WWE's official website. Undertaker defeated Triple H in a No Holds Barred match at WrestleMania XXVII to extend his undefeated WrestleMania Streak to 19-0, but the beatdown he received during the match had left him to leave the ring on a cart.

=== SmackDown ===
After defeating The Undertaker, Kane set up a "funeral service" for his half-brother on the October 29 episode of SmackDown, but was interrupted by Rey Mysterio, Alberto Del Rio and Edge who wanted to have a shot at the World Heavyweight Championship. Edge defeated Mysterio and Del Rio in a Triple Threat Match to become the number one contender to face Kane for the World Heavyweight Championship at Survivor Series. The match ended in a draw, so Kane retained his title.

The Undertaker and Kane would not appear on screen together until 2012 at Raw 1000, where The Undertaker would return to help Kane fend off Jinder Mahal, Curt Hawkins, Tyler Reks, Camacho, and Drew McIntyre.

=== Future ===
The 2010 event was the final Bragging Rights as it was discontinued due to the dissolution of the first brand split in August 2011. The event's PPV slot was replaced by a reinstated Vengeance that year. With the discontinuation of Bragging Rights, the SmackDown brand was the only winner of the Bragging Rights Trophy. After the brand split was reinstated in 2016, WWE reintroduced a similar brand competition theme for the annual Survivor Series from 2016 to 2021.

== Results ==
No.	Results	Stipulations	Times
1^{D}	Montel Vontavious Porter defeated Chavo Guerrero by pinfall	Singles match	—
2	Daniel Bryan defeated Dolph Ziggler (with Vickie Guerrero) by submission	Interpromotional singles match	16:14
3	The Nexus (David Otunga and John Cena) defeated "Dashing" Cody Rhodes and Drew McIntyre (c) by submission	Tag team match for the WWE Tag Team Championship	06:29
4	Ted DiBiase (with Maryse) defeated Goldust (with Aksana) by pinfall	Singles match	07:29
5	Layla (c) (with Michelle McCool) defeated Natalya by pinfall	Singles match for the WWE Divas Championship	05:23
6	Kane (c) (with Paul Bearer) defeated The Undertaker by burying him alive	Buried Alive match for the World Heavyweight Championship	16:59
7	Team SmackDown (Alberto Del Rio, Big Show, Edge, Jack Swagger, Kofi Kingston, Rey Mysterio, and Tyler Reks) (with Hornswoggle) defeated Team Raw (CM Punk, Ezekiel Jackson, John Morrison, The Miz, R-Truth, Santino Marella, and Sheamus) (with Alex Riley) by pinfall	14-man elimination tag team match for the Bragging Rights Trophy	27:40
8	Wade Barrett (with John Cena) defeated Randy Orton (c) by disqualification	Singles match for the WWE Championship; Had Barrett lost, Cena would have been fired.	14:34
(c) / – the champion(s) heading into the match; D / – this was a dark match

14-man interpromotional elimination tag team match

Elimination	Wrestler	Team	Eliminated by	Elimination move	Time
1	Santino Marella	Raw	Tyler Reks	Burning Hammer	02:38
2	Kofi Kingston	SmackDown	Sheamus	High Cross	06:52
3	Jack Swagger	SmackDown	John Morrison	Starship Pain	13:07
4	Tyler Reks	SmackDown	Sheamus	Brogue Kick	14:32
5	Big Show	SmackDown	N/A	Counted out	15:29
6	Sheamus	Raw	N/A	Counted out	15:29
7	R-Truth	Raw	Edge	Spear	16:42
8	John Morrison	Raw	Edge	Spear	17:09
9	Alberto Del Rio	SmackDown	CM Punk	Back Slide	18:05
10	CM Punk	Raw	Rey Mysterio	619	24:07
11	Ezekiel Jackson	Raw	Rey Mysterio	619	26:16
12	The Miz	Raw	Edge	Spear	27:40
Winner:	Team SmackDown (Edge and Rey Mysterio)				
