= WWE Cyber Sunday =

- WWE Cyber Sunday logo
- Promotions: World Wrestling Entertainment
- Brands: Raw (2004–2008); SmackDown (2007–2008); ECW (2007–2008); NXT (2022)
- Other names: Taboo Tuesday (2004–2005)
- First event: Taboo Tuesday (2004)
- Last event: Cyber Sunday (2008)
- Event gimmick: Interactive pay-per-view in which fans vote on certain aspects of the matches

WWE Cyber Sunday (originally known as WWE Taboo Tuesday) was an annual professional wrestling pay-per-view (PPV) event produced by World Wrestling Entertainment (WWE), a professional wrestling promotion based in Connecticut. Established in 2004, the event was originally called Taboo Tuesday as it was held on Tuesdays. In 2006, the event was moved to the more traditional Sunday night for PPVs and was renamed Cyber Sunday. The theme of the event was the ability for fans to vote on certain aspects of every match, using their personal computers and text messaging via mobile phones. The voting typically began in the middle of an episode of Raw a few weeks beforehand and ended during the pay-per-view, often moments before the match was slated to begin. Because of this, the event was billed as an "interactive pay-per-view."

During the event's first two years as Taboo Tuesday, it was held exclusively for wrestlers from the Raw brand. The 2006 event, which was the first held as Cyber Sunday, was also Raw-exclusive. Following WrestleMania 23 in 2007, however, brand-exclusive PPVs were discontinued, thus the events in 2007 and 2008 featured the Raw, SmackDown, and ECW brands. The event was discontinued and replaced by Bragging Rights in 2009. The event was revived as an NXT television special in 2022, but not branded as Taboo Tuesday.

== History ==
The event's logo when it was called Taboo Tuesday in 2004–2005

In 2004, World Wrestling Entertainment (WWE) established a new pay-per-view (PPV) event titled Taboo Tuesday. The inaugural event was held on October 19 that year, and as its name implies, it was held on a Tuesday. It was the first regularly scheduled pay-per-view held by the company on a Tuesday since 1991's This Tuesday in Texas, the first regularly scheduled non-Sunday pay-per-view since the 1994 Survivor Series, and the first non-Sunday pay-per-view of any kind since In Your House 8: Beware of Dog 2 in 1996.

To coincide with the brand extension, in which the promotion divided its roster into brands where wrestlers were exclusively assigned to perform, the inaugural event was held exclusively for the Raw brand. Taboo Tuesday returned in 2005, but was pushed back to early November and was also Raw-exclusive. In 2006, which was again Raw-exclusive and held in November, the show was moved to a more traditional Sunday night slot—alleviating problems with the taping schedule of SmackDown!, usually held on Tuesdays. As a result, the event was renamed Cyber Sunday. Following WrestleMania 23 in April 2007, WWE discontinued brand-exclusive PPVs, thus the 2007 and 2008 events, which were both held in October, featured wrestlers from the Raw, SmackDown, and ECW brands. In 2009, the event's pay-per-view slot was replaced by Annihilation then later renamed Bragging Rights.

Almost a decade after the discontinuation of the PPV, elements of this event were incorporated into NXT's television program for its NXT 2.0 one-year anniversary special but the event is not called Taboo Tuesday.

== Concept ==
The most distinctive feature of the event was the ability for fans to vote on certain aspects of every match, using their personal computers and text messaging via mobile phones. The voting typically began in the middle of an episode of Raw a few weeks beforehand and ended during the pay-per-view, often moments before the match was slated to begin. Because of this, the event was billed as an "interactive pay-per-view." For the first four events, voting was made online through WWE.com, with the official tagline for the PPV being "Log On. Take Over." In 2008, however, this was replaced by votes through text messaging, but this was only available to United States mobile carriers. However, the match between The Undertaker and Big Show was made universal, as fans were allowed to vote for the match stipulation on WWE.com. After Cyber Sunday was discontinued, the fan interaction aspects of the pay-per-view were incorporated into Raw as WWEActive (originally RawActive) for some Raw episodes, which was eventually dropped altogether.

== Events ==
Raw-branded event

#	Event	Date	City	Venue	Main event	Ref.
1	Taboo Tuesday (2004)	October 19, 2004	Milwaukee, Wisconsin	Bradley Center	Randy Orton vs. Ric Flair in a Steel Cage match	
2	Taboo Tuesday (2005)	November 1, 2005	San Diego, California	iPayOne Center	John Cena (c) vs. Kurt Angle vs. Shawn Michaels in a triple threat match for the WWE Championship	
3	Cyber Sunday (2006)	November 5, 2006	Cincinnati, Ohio	U.S. Bank Arena	King Booker (c) vs. WWE Champion John Cena vs. ECW World Champion Big Show in a "Champion of Champions" triple threat match for the World Heavyweight Championship	
4	Cyber Sunday (2007)	October 28, 2007	Washington, D.C.	Verizon Center	Batista (c) vs. The Undertaker for the World Heavyweight Championship with Stone Cold Steve Austin as the special guest referee	
5	Cyber Sunday (2008)	October 26, 2008	Phoenix, Arizona	US Airways Center	Chris Jericho (c) vs. Batista for the World Heavyweight Championship with Stone Cold Steve Austin as the special guest referee	
(c) – refers to the champion(s) heading into the match
