= WWE Bragging Rights =

- WWE Bragging Rights logo
- Promotions: World Wrestling Entertainment
- Brands: Raw (2009–2010); SmackDown (2009–2010); ECW (2009)
- Other names: Survivor Series
- First event: 2009
- Last event: 2010
- Event gimmick: Interpromotional matches for "bragging rights"

WWE Bragging Rights was a professional wrestling pay-per-view (PPV) event produced by World Wrestling Entertainment (WWE), a professional wrestling promotion based in Connecticut. The event was established in 2009 and replaced Cyber Sunday in the late October slot of WWE's pay-per-view calendar. The concept of the show involved a series of interpromotional matches for "bragging rights" between wrestlers from the Raw and SmackDown brand divisions with a Bragging Rights trophy awarded as a prize. Among the matches, a 14-man tag team match was held between the two brands. In 2009, the show that won the most matches out of the series won the trophy. However, in 2010, which was the final event, the winning brand was simply determined by the 14-man tag team match. The SmackDown brand won the trophy both times the event was held.

In 2011, Bragging Rights was replaced by the returning Vengeance as the October scheduled event. However, in 2012, WWE opted to have only one pay-per-view in October, Hell in a Cell, scrapping Vengeance and moving Hell in a Cell to the last Sunday in October. In 2016, WWE incorporated a similar concept of interpromotional matches into their long-standing Survivor Series event, which has been the theme of that event until 2021.

== History ==
In 2009, World Wrestling Entertainment (WWE) established Bragging Rights to replace Cyber Sunday as their October pay-per-view (PPV). This inaugural event took place on October 25, 2009. A second Bragging Rights was held the following year on October 24, 2010; however, this would be the final Bragging Rights event, as WWE discontinued the PPV and replaced it with the returning Vengeance, although Vengeance itself would be dropped in 2012 in favor of only having one October PPV per year, Hell in a Cell. Originally, the event was to be named "Annihilation" but it was changed to Bragging Rights due to an trademark infringement by Marvel Comics who owns the rights to all Annihilation intellectual property.

With only two events held in the Bragging Rights PPV chronology, both took place in indoor arenas in the United States. Championship bouts were scheduled on every card, with the lower-tier titles featured on the undercard and the top-tier featured on the main card. Non-interpromotional matches for the card were restricted by the brand split, where WWE assigned its performers to either the Raw or SmackDown brands, causing these matches to only be set up between wrestlers on the same show.

== Concept ==
The concept of this pay-per-view was that there were a series of matches to determine which WWE brand, Raw or SmackDown, would receive the bragging rights trophy. The interpromotional matches that took place included the United States Champion vs. the Intercontinental Champion, and a 14-man tag team match between the two brands. In 2009, there was an interpromotional six-diva tag team match, but that was scrapped in 2010. Also, the 14-man tag team match was under elimination rules in 2010. In 2009, the winner was determined by who won the most matches, but in 2010, the tag team match determined the winner. SmackDown won the trophy both years. Although the ECW brand had a dark match prior to the 2009 show, it was not involved in the interbrand competition, and ECW was disbanded in February 2010, several months before the second and final Bragging Rights event.

In 2016, WWE incorporated a similar concept of interpromotional matches into their long-standing Survivor Series event, and the event is now centered around competition for brand supremacy.

== Events ==
#	Event	Date	City	Venue	Main event	Winning brand	Teams	Ref.
1	Bragging Rights (2009)	October 25, 2009	Pittsburgh, Pennsylvania	Mellon Arena	Randy Orton (c) vs. John Cena in a 60-minute Anything Goes Iron Man match for the WWE Championship	SmackDown	Team Raw (D-Generation X (Triple H & Shawn Michaels) (Co-Captains), The Big Show, Cody Rhodes, Jack Swagger, Kofi Kingston, and Mark Henry) vs. Team SmackDown (Kane & Chris Jericho (Co-Captains), R-Truth, Matt Hardy, Finlay, and The Hart Dynasty (Tyson Kidd & David Hart Smith))	
2	Bragging Rights (2010)	October 24, 2010	Minneapolis, Minnesota	Target Center	Randy Orton (c) vs. Wade Barrett for the WWE Championship	SmackDown	Team Raw (The Miz (captain), Ezekiel Jackson, Sheamus, John Morrison, CM Punk, Santino Marella, and R-Truth) vs. Team SmackDown (The Big Show (captain), Jack Swagger, Kofi Kingston, Tyler Reks, Alberto Del Rio, Rey Mysterio, and Edge)	
(c) – refers to the champion(s) heading into the match

== See also ==
- List of WWE pay-per-view events
