= Girl on the Third Floor =

2019 horror film directed by Travis Stevens

- Directed by: Travis Stevens
- Written by: Paul Johnstone; Ben Parker; Travis Stevens
- Produced by: Giles Edwards; Nicola Goelzhaeuser; Brett Hays; Paul Johnstone; Greg Newman; Ben Parker; Travis Stevens
- Starring: Phil Brooks; Trieste Kelly Dunn; Sarah Brooks
- Cinematography: Scott Thiele
- Edited by: Aaron Crozier; Scott Draper
- Music by: Steve Albini; Alison Chesley; Tim Midyett; Gaelynn Lea
- Production company: Queensbury Pictures
- Distributed by: Dark Sky Films
- Release dates: March 10, 2019 (South by Southwest); October 25, 2019 (United States)
- Running time: 93 minutes
- Country: United States
- Language: English
- Box office: $145,856

Girl on the Third Floor is a 2019 American horror film directed by Travis Stevens, who co-wrote the screenplay with Paul Johnstone and Ben Parker. It stars Phil Brooks as a deeply flawed man who renovates an old home for himself and his wife, and the supernatural events that ensue as they prepare to move in.

Girl on the Third Floor was released worldwide on Netflix on October 25, 2019, having garnered largely positive reviews at the South By Southwest, Boston Underground, and London FrightFest film festivals. Reviewers praised Stevens' command of the horror genre as a new director, Brooks' convincing performance, and the film's "wonderful and gross" usage of practical special effects by British effects artist Daniel Martin. It grossed $145,856 from brief theatrical runs in Mexico and Russia.

== Plot ==
Don Koch, a man from Chicago with a criminal past, purchases an old house in the nearby town of Ellington with hopes for a new start alongside his pregnant wife Liz and their dog Cooper. Shortly after moving in on his own to start repairs, Don meets Ellie Mueller, a pastor who lives across the street. He later learns from local bar owner Geary McCabe about the house's sordid past and its effect on men. He witnesses strange events within the home, including a sludge-like substance seeping from the walls and fixtures, as well as the appearance of marbles scattered throughout the house. Don next meets another neighbor, Sarah Yates, who easily seduces him in the upstairs bedroom. After she leaves, the bedroom ceiling collapses to reveal a viewing platform in the attic. The next day, Sarah appears again and tries to seduce Don, but he admits his guilt and dismisses her.

Don's former co-worker Milo Stone arrives at the house to help him patch the bedroom ceiling, but he soon meets Sarah and learns about Don's affair. The two men have an argument, after which Don leaves to buy more supplies, telling Milo not to return if he cannot keep the secret. While Don is out, Milo follows a rolling marble into the basement, where he is murdered by Sarah. When Don returns and does not see Milo, he assumes Milo left. The next day, Liz sees Sarah in the background during a video call with Don. Becoming nervous, Don installs new locks and security cameras. That night, Sarah lures Cooper downstairs with a marble. When Don wakes up the next morning, he finds Cooper dead in the dryer.

The police give no help, and a furious Don waits for Sarah to appear. He kills her and attempts to bury her body within the basement walls. He gets a call from Liz and leaves the body, finding it missing when he returns to finish the job. Don searches for the body and breaks through some walls, where he finds a secret room in the attic with drawings on the wall of a girl with a birdman figure. While searching other walls, he finds Milo's severed head. He sees a deformed woman, who attacks him with a marble that tunnels under his skin and into his body. He slices his own neck with a knife to try to remove the marble while the woman releases more marbles towards him.

Liz arrives and finds a newspaper article from 1909 about the house's past as a brothel with a report about a missing body. Sarah appears and claims she is helping Don renovate the house. Ellie rings the doorbell and tells Liz that the house is bad for relationships. Liz returns to the house and experiences a vision from the house's past with strange men going upstairs to watch "the show". She goes up into the attic and sees a crowd of men in suits peering down into her bedroom, where Sarah performs BDSM with a masked birdman. She sees a little girl named Sadie in a dark corner of the room drawing on the wall when the masked man gives Sadie a bag of marbles.

When Liz returns to the bedroom, she once again sees Sarah, who confesses that the brothel owner killed her and buried her corpse in the walls. She attacks Liz, who hides in the bedroom, where she finds Don's lacerated body. He confesses his affair and begs for Liz's forgiveness, but she refuses. Sarah reveals herself inside Don's skin and explains that Don's appearance was a trick to test Liz, then allows Liz to leave the house for being strong against the will of a man. Liz runs downstairs, sees the deformed woman, and kills her. As Liz leaves, she finds Ellie, who explains how each person must choose to enter and face their actions. Deciding to stay in the house to lift the curse, Liz finds Sarah's body and gives it a proper burial.

Six months later, Liz is living happily alone in the house with her daughter. When the baby is left alone, Don appears in a ceiling grate and drops marbles into her crib.

== Cast ==
- Phil Brooks as Don Koch
- Trieste Kelly Dunn as Liz Koch
- Sarah Brooks as Sarah Yates
- Elissa Dowling as Sadie
- Karen Woditsch as Ellie Mueller
- Travis Delgado as Milo Stone
- Marshall Bean as Geary McCabe
- Anish Jethmalani as Manny Bharara
- Bishop Stevens as Patrolman Weaver
- Tonya Kay as The Nymph
- Ryker as Cooper
- Eileah Pyrzynski as Baby

== Production ==
During the post-screening Q&A of the film at the 2019 SXSW, Stevens stated that much of the story he co-wrote was not entirely fictional, claiming that the house was real and its backstory was "only slightly embellished for the film".

The film was shot in Frankfort, Illinois, at a house that had been newly acquired to accommodate the headquarters of Stevens' production company. The house was actually in the process of being renovated at the time, and Stevens paused the renovations in order to use their incomplete state as part of the movie.

== Release ==
Girl on the Third Floor was released on Netflix on October 25, 2019, though it did raise box office of $145,856 from brief theatrical runs in Mexico and Russia. The film was previously shown at several film festivals, including its world premiere at SXSW and showings at BUFF and the London FrightFest Film Festival.

- World Premiere – SXSW 2019 – Midnighters
- Official Selection – Boston Underground Film Festival 2019
- Official Selection – Chattanooga Film Festival 2019
- Official Selection – Overlook Film Festival 2019
- Official Selection – Popcorn Frights Film Festival 2019
- Official Selection – FrightFest London 2019
- Official Selection – Knoxville Horror Film Festival 2019
- Official Selection – Fantasy Film Fest 2019
- Official Selection – WYO Film Festival 2019
- Official Selection – Cinema/Chicago Film Festival, 18 October 2019

== Reception ==
On the review aggregator website Rotten Tomatoes, 84% of 38 critics' reviews are positive, with an average rating of 6.7/10. Metacritic, which uses a weighted average, assigned the film a score of 65 out of 100, based on 6 critics, indicating "generally favorable" reviews.

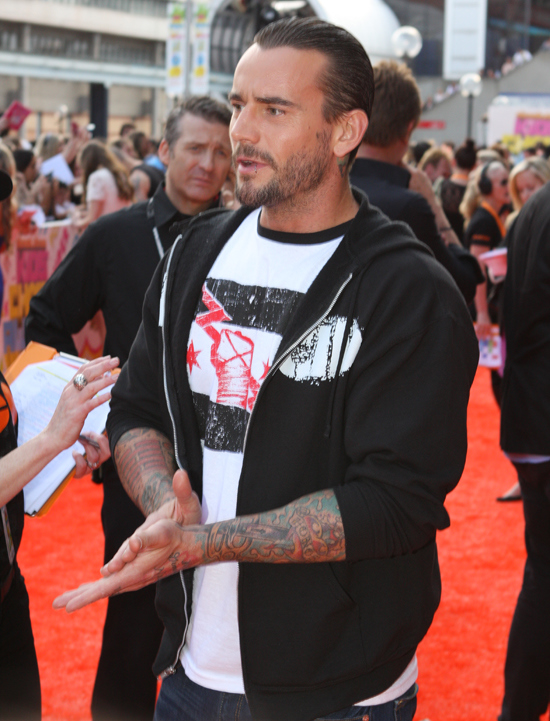
Professional wrestler and occasional actor Brooks, whose performance in his first leading role was singled out as a highlight

Oscar Goff of Boston Hassle noted that Stevens "throws a lot of ideas at the wall, and while not all of them stick, the cumulative effect is dizzying and effective".

Anton Bitel of SciFiNow designated the film a "highly accomplished" haunted house story for the #MeToo generation: "The undoing of 'King Don' is a belated revenge of the female repressed, as well as a long history of perverted patriarchy replaying itself ad nauseam and deconstructing... the uneasy, even exploitative and violent relations between men and women."

Deidre Crimmins from RueMorgue noted that while "nearly equal screen time is given to lingering on both male and female bodies, the film itself never quite gets away from feeling a little unkind to women". She pointed out that the female characters are presented as "not much more than archetypes" and that "the men don't get portrayed very well either, but at least they are given a little more to do". She did extol the practical effects, calling them equally "amazing" and "gross".

Dennis Harvey of Variety considered Stevens' directorial skills to be "well above average" for the horror genre, but offered a mixed review of the film, noting how it draws from films like The Amityville Horror, The Shining, and Eyes Wide Shut. He considered Sarah Brooks' lack of convincing "inner malevolence" to be terrifying.

In trying to define the film for her readers, Heather Wixson of Daily Dead noted that Stevens' "memorable directorial debut" feels like what one would get "if Clive Barker and H.P. Lovecraft had teamed up to make The Money Pit" and singled out Brooks' acting as "compelling". Bobby Lepire of FilmThreat also complimented Brooks' performance, further noting that Stevens has an "innate understanding" of the lessons that horror films teach; in this case, a horror story as morality play. Lepire also felt that Stevens effectively sustained an atmosphere of dread throughout the film that ran "out of steam before the conclusion, making for a not quite, but almost, great film".

Film School Rejects writer Rob Hunter pointed out that while haunted house films usually involve misdeeds of the past affecting the present, Girl on the Third Floor instead has present-day bad behaviors "unintentionally reaching out to past transgressions" while opining that Brooks resembles "nothing less than the angry love child of Jon Hamm and Ted Raimi with his expressive antics here—walking a fine line with a character who earns our sympathy before threatening to lose it". Hunter saw the main character as needing to find redemption for his past misdeeds and expressed his hope that "this guy, finally, will understand and acknowledge his actions before it's too late".

Nick Johnston of Vanyaland described the connection between the main character's behavior and the house's reaction: "Stevens' thematic goals here are interesting and compelling. It's all about a bad man paying for his behavior and, thusly, the actions that his misogynistic forbearers [sic] committed decades ago, and when that bad man is played by Phil Brooks, it becomes infinitely more interesting."

Adi Robertson of TheVerge.com noted that, instead of trying to push the narrative limits of the haunted house trope, Girl on the Third Floor generates suspense through the predictable and inevitable fall of the main character, using foreshadowing and jump scares. Robertson, praising the effectiveness of the practical effects, said that "marbles, mucus, and doorbells have never been so ominous".

Kevin Lee of Film Inquiry said that despite "clunky writing", the film's efficiency lies in two areas: "The house—with its creepy noises and gross leakages—is more than just old and in need of renovation. It is also clear that Stevens is exploring the fallout of toxic masculinity through Don's disreputable past and his refusal to accept help with the extensive renovations." Lee notes that it is this behavior and shady past that make Don "a vulnerable victim to the house's psychological effect" and that "whether or not the film works for you depends on your opinion of Don". Lee also pointed out that the film's final act clearly demonstrates Stevens' knowledge of surrealism and the influence of Darren Aronofsky's horror film mother! (2017).

Brian Tallerico from RogerEbert.com stated that Stevens' previous experience as a producer of respected indie horror films was evident in his directorial debut. He pointed out the metaphor of the main character's devotion to fixing something physical because he is unwilling to perform the "real repair" on his flawed character, which is the source of the problem.

Slashfilm reviewer Matt Donato said that "there have been smoother and more leveled 'tortured past inhabitants won't leave' realty nightmares than Girl on the Third Floor, but this one ain't too shabby". He noted how Stevens "breaks a man down, tears a house apart, and leaves us with the ultimate conclusion that forgiveness can only be granted so many times".
