= CM Punk =

American professional wrestler (born 1978)

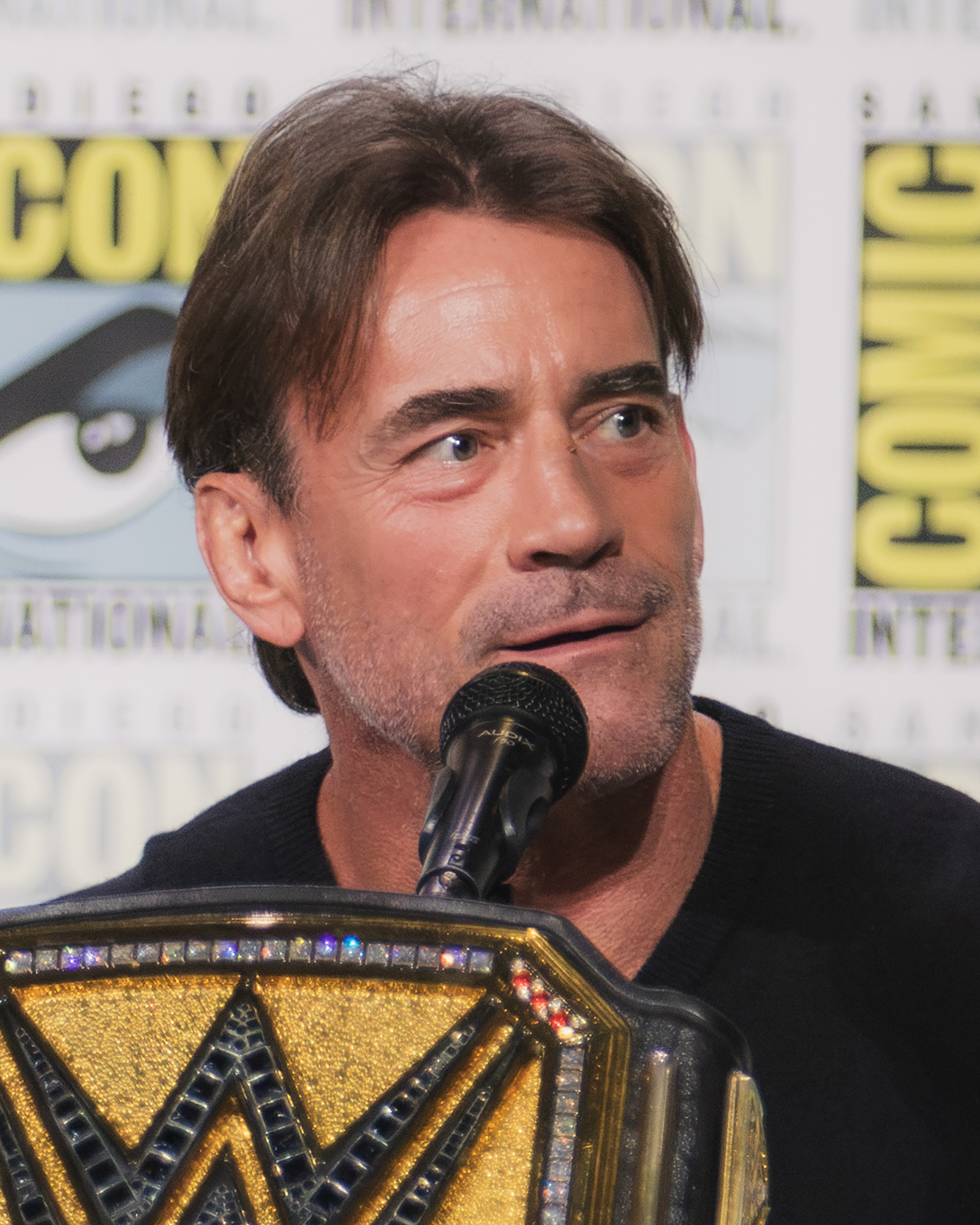
- Punk in 2026

Personal information
- Born: Phillip Jack Brooks; October 26, 1978 (age 48) Chicago, Illinois, U.S.
- Occupations: Professional wrestler; actor
- Years active: 1997–present
- Spouse: AJ Lee (m. 2014)

Professional wrestling career
- Ring name: CM Punk
- Billed height: 6 ft 2 in (188 cm)
- Billed weight: 218 lb (99 kg)
- Billed from: Chicago, Illinois
- Trained by: Ace Steel; Danny Dominion; Kevin Quinn; Steel Dominion; Antonio Inoki; Inoki Dojo; Dave Taylor; Fit Finlay; William Regal; Ohio Valley Wrestling
- Debut: October 25, 1997

Phillip Jack Brooks (born October 26, 1978), better known by his ring name CM Punk, is an American professional wrestler, actor, and former mixed martial artist. As of November 2023, he is signed to WWE, where he performs on the SmackDown brand.

Brooks began his wrestling career on the independent circuit in 1997. He joined Ring of Honor (ROH) in 2002, winning the ROH World Championship once, and was inducted into the ROH Hall of Fame in 2022. Brooks joined WWE in 2005 and won the World Heavyweight Championship three times, (Note: This refers to the version of the championship active between 2002 and 2013.) the ECW Championship, the WWE Intercontinental Championship, the WWE Championship twice, and the World Tag Team Championship (Note: This refers to the version of the championship active between 1971 and 2010.) once each. Brooks also won the Money in the Bank ladder match in 2008 and 2009 (making him its only back-to-back winner), was named Superstar of the Year at the 2011 Slammy Awards, and was voted PWI Wrestler of the Year in 2011 and 2012. After acrimoniously leaving WWE in 2014, Brooks retired from wrestling but returned in 2021 when he joined All Elite Wrestling (AEW), where he won the AEW World Championship twice. Brooks was fired in September 2023 after backstage controversies and returned to WWE two months later, where he has since won the World Heavyweight Championship twice (Note: This refers to the version of the championship active since 2023.) and the WWE Championship once more. Brooks was inducted into the Wrestling Observer Newsletter Hall of Fame in 2025.

Outside of wrestling, Brooks pursued a career in mixed martial arts and joined the welterweight division of Ultimate Fighting Championship (UFC), losing via submission to Mickey Gall in his professional debut at UFC 203 in 2016. He lost his second fight to Mike Jackson via unanimous decision at UFC 225 in 2018, which was later overturned to a no contest; he never fought again and retired in August 2021. He worked as a pundit on WWE Backstage (2019–2020) and has been a part-time color commentator for Cage Fury Fighting Championships since 2018. He also starred in the horror films Rabid (2019), Girl on the Third Floor (2019), and Jakob's Wife (2021), the animated comedy Zootopia 2 (2025), as well as the wrestling drama series Heels (2021–2023) and the crime drama Mayans M.C. (2022–2023). Brooks is known for his outspoken and confrontational straight edge persona, which is based on his real-life experiences.

== Early life ==
Phillip Jack Brooks was born in Chicago, Illinois, on October 26, 1978. He is the youngest son of housewife Harriet Jadwiga (née Kowalski; 1946–2016) and electrician Daniel Brooks. His mother was born in Germany to Polish parents, while his father had Irish ancestry. Brooks has said his umbilical cord was wrapped around his neck upon birth, causing his face to appear blue. He and his estranged older brother, Michal, were raised in Lockport, Illinois.

Brooks' father struggled with alcoholism, which led him to adopt a straight-edge lifestyle as a teenager. His mother, whom he was also estranged from, suffered from bipolar disorder; he later reportedly obtained a restraining order against her in June 2013. Due to his turbulent childhood, Brooks was welcomed into the family of his childhood best friend, Chez. His first job was at a comic book shop named All American Comics in Evergreen Park, Illinois, which closed in January 2022. "Rowdy" Roddy Piper was an early influence on Brooks; he cites him as the reason he pursued professional wrestling. He was arrested multiple times during his time as a student at Lockport Township High School.

== Professional wrestling career ==
=== Early career; IWA Mid-South (1997–2005) ===
Brooks' first venture into wrestling was a stint in a backyard wrestling federation called the Lunatic Wrestling Federation with his older brother Michal and their friends in the mid-to-late 1990s. He had his debut match on October 25, 1997, the day before his 19th birthday, defeating Brawn the Lumberjack. He first started using the ring name CM Punk when he was put into a tag team named the "Chick Magnets" with CM Venom after another performer skipped out on the card; the "CM" originally stood for "Chick Magnet" but was later amended to have no meaning. Unlike his friends, Punk genuinely wanted to be a wrestler and saw it as more than simple fun. When the promotion started taking off while doing shows out of a warehouse in Mokena, Illinois, Punk found out that Michal had embezzled thousands of dollars from the small company, causing them to become estranged; they have not spoken since.

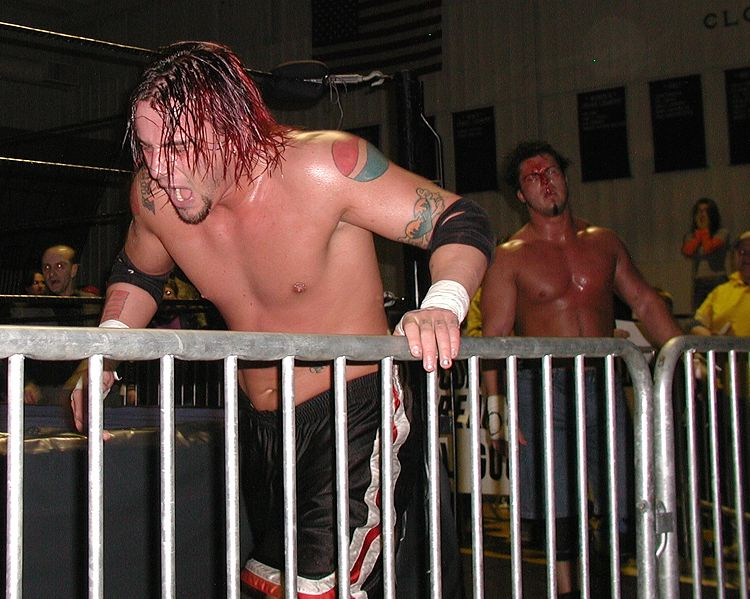
Punk (front) in a match against his trainer Danny Dominion at an NWA Midwest event in November 2002

After leaving the Lunatic Wrestling Federation, Punk enrolled as a student at the Steel Dominion wrestling school in Chicago, where he was trained by Ace Steel, Danny Dominion, and Kevin Quinn to become a professional wrestler. As part of the training, he began wrestling at Steel Domain Wrestling in St. Paul, Minnesota, in 1999. It was in the Steel Domain that he met Scott Colton, who soon adopted the ring name Colt Cabana. Punk and Cabana became best friends and spent most of their early career together working in the same independent promotions, as both opponents and tag team partners. In the independents, along Cabana and other fellow Steel Domain graduates Chucke E. Smooth, Adam Pearce, and manager Dave Prazak, Punk formed an alliance named the Gold Bond Mafia.

In 2002, Punk became the International Wrestling Cartel (IWC) Heavyweight Champion, in Monroeville, Pennsylvania. Punk would compete in the company's Super Indy tournament, but never won the championship. Punk's home promotion for his early career was considered to be the Independent Wrestling Association Mid-South (IWA Mid-South). During Punk's time in IWA Mid-South, he had high-profile feuds with Colt Cabana and Chris Hero while also rising to the top of the roster, winning the IWA Mid-South Light Heavyweight Championship twice and the IWA Mid-South Heavyweight Championship on five separate occasions, beating wrestlers like AJ Styles, Cabana, and Eddie Guerrero in matches for the heavyweight championship. Punk's feud with Hero included a 55-minute Tables, Ladders, and Chairs (TLC) match, a 93-minute two out of three falls match and several 60-minute time limit draws. From July 2003 until May 2004, Punk refused to wrestle for IWA Mid-South, explaining this as a protest to Ian Rotten's mistreatment of Chris Hero in the company. However, Hero has stated he believes there were other reasons, and Rotten's treatment of him was just an excuse by Punk to stop working for the company. Punk eventually returned to IWA Mid-South and continued to perform as a wrestler and commentator for them until July 2005.

=== NWA: Total Nonstop Action (2002–2004) ===
Punk made his debut for NWA: Total Nonstop Action alongside his trainer Ace Steel on September 18, 2002, where he and Steel defeated Derek Wylde and Jimmy Rave and The Hot Shots (Cassidy O'Reilly and Chase Stevens) in a three-way match to qualify for the tag team Gauntlet for the Gold later in the night, with the winning team facing America's Most Wanted (Chris Harris and James Storm) in a match for the vacant NWA World Tag Team Championship. Punk then returned to TNA in mid-2003, while simultaneously wrestling for Ring of Honor. Upon his full-time signing with TNA, Punk was paired with Julio Dinero as members of Raven's stable The Gathering.

Shortly before an NWA: TNA show on February 25, 2004, Punk had a physical scuffle with Teddy Hart outside of a restaurant that was broken up by Sabu. The altercation reportedly stemmed from an ROH show in which Hart performed three unplanned spots, putting several other wrestlers in danger of injury. Around the time of the scuffle, Punk and Dinero stopped appearing on TNA shows, leading to speculation that he was fired for the incident. However, Punk said the scuffle had no bearing on his TNA career. Brooks said the reason he and Dinero stopped appearing on TNA's pay-per-view events was that TNA officials believed he and Dinero had not connected with the fans as villains, after having turned against the popular Raven and instead formed a villainous tag team managed by James Mitchell. For this reason, officials decided the storyline would be put on hold indefinitely, and thus had no work for Punk or Dinero. Punk officially quit TNA in March 2004 during the Rob Feinstein controversy after having a dispute with the TNA offices over his ability to compete in ROH following a TNA order that their contracted wrestlers were to no longer wrestle in ROH.

=== Ring of Honor (2002–2006, 2022) ===
==== Second City Saints (2002–2004) ====
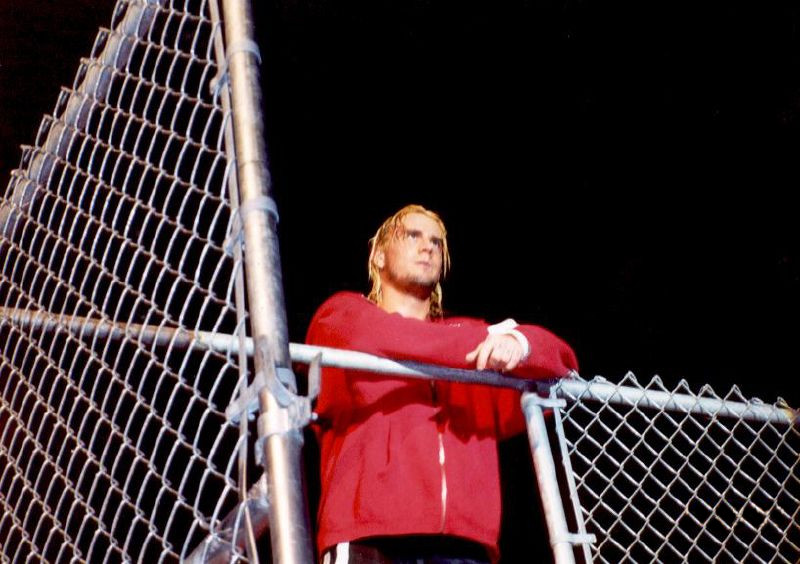
Punk in Ring of Honor in 2003

Punk's matches with Colt Cabana led him to being hired by ROH. CM Punk made his in-ring debut on ROH at All Star Extravaganza on November 9, 2002, in a gauntlet match involving five participants, that was won by Bryan Danielson. Initially, Punk joined ROH as a face, trading wins with Cabana at Night of the Butcher and Final Battle. but quickly turned heel in a feud with Raven that featured multiple variants of a no disqualification match. Their rivalry was rooted in Punk's straight-edge lifestyle, with him likening Raven to his alcoholic father; At Night of Champions, Punk and his trainer Ace Steel faced Raven and Cabana in a tag team match, during which Cabana turned on Raven, allowing Punk and Steel to win the match. Consequently, Punk, Steel, and Cabana formed a trio called the Second City Saints. Punk and Raven's rivalry lasted most of 2003 and was considered one of ROH's top feuds of the year. It was settled at The Conclusion in November 2003, where Punk defeated Raven in a steel cage match. In late-2003, Punk was hired as the first head trainer of the Ring of Honor wrestling school, having previously been a trainer for the Steel Domain and Primetime Wrestling.

After concluding the rivalry with Raven, the Second City Saints turned face by feuding with The Prophecy (Christopher Daniels, B.J. Whitmer and Dan Maff), suspecting them of attacking Punk's on-screen girlfriend Lucy Fer. Whitmer was revealed to be the assailant, which led to Saints facing Prophecy in a six-man tag team match at The Battle Lines Are Drawn, which ended in a no contest. The match concluded when Punk drove Daniels with a Pepsi Plunge off the top rope through a table, thus explaining Daniels' departure from ROH. Around this time, Punk began climbing the ranks of ROH, including coming in second at the Second Anniversary Show during the tournament to crown the first ROH Pure Champion, losing to AJ Styles in the finals. At Reborn: Stage Two, Punk and Cabana defeated the Briscoe Brothers to win their first ROH Tag Team Championship. At Round Robin Challenge III, the Second City Saints lost the Tag Team Championship to B.J. Whitmer and Dan Maff in a round robin challenge, but defeated the Briscoe Brothers later that night to win their second Tag Team Championship.

The Second City Saints avenged their loss to the Prophecy by defeating them to retain the titles at Generation Next. They held the titles throughout the summer before eventually losing them to The Havana Pitbulls at Testing The Limit. In mid-2004, Punk faced off against ROH World Champion Samoa Joe for the championship in a three-match series. On June 12 at World Title Classic, the first match resulted in a 60-minute time limit draw, when neither Punk nor Joe could pin or cause the other to submit within the allotted 60 minutes. On October 16 at Joe vs. Punk II, they wrestled to a second 60-minute draw. In addition to Joe vs. Punk II becoming Ring of Honor's bestselling DVD at the time, the match received a five-star rating by famed wrestling journalist Dave Meltzer of the Wrestling Observer Newsletter. It was the first match in North America to receive a five-star rating in seven years. Joe ended the series by defeating Punk in the third and final match on December 4 at All-Star Extravaganza 2, in which there was a no-time-limit stipulation.

==== ROH World Champion (2005) ====
Though he had accepted a deal to join the World Wrestling Entertainment (WWE), Punk defeated Austin Aries to win the ROH World Championship on June 18 at Death Before Dishonor III. Despite entering the match as a face, immediately after winning the match and the title, Punk proceeded to turn heel and started a storyline where he threatened to take the ROH World Championship to WWE with him. For weeks, Punk teased the ROH locker room and the ROH fans, mocking the championship he possessed, going so far as to sign his WWE contract on top of it. During the storyline, referred to by ROH as the "Summer of Punk", Mick Foley made several ROH appearances, attempting to convince Punk to do the right thing and defend the title on his way out. On August 12, Punk lost the ROH World Championship to James Gibson in a four corner elimination match, which also involved Samoa Joe and Christopher Daniels. Punk's final scheduled match in ROH took place at Punk: The Final Chapter on August 13, 2005, against long-time friend Colt Cabana in a two out of three falls match, which he lost.

==== Special appearances (2006, 2022) ====
Punk made a special appearance at the ROH show Unscripted II on February 11, 2006, when the original card had to be scrapped due to Low Ki leaving ROH the week prior. In the main event, Punk teamed with Bryan Danielson to defeat Adam Pearce and Jimmy Rave in a tag team match. Punk was inducted into the ROH Hall of Fame as part of the 2022 inaugural class.

=== World Wrestling Entertainment / WWE (2005–2014) ===
==== Ohio Valley Wrestling (2005–2006) ====
Upon being signed by World Wrestling Entertainment (WWE), CM Punk was assigned to Ohio Valley Wrestling (OVW), its developmental territory, where he was mentored by Paul Heyman. He debuted in September 2005 in a dark match. During his time in OVW, he won every title in the promotion: the OVW Television Championship the OVW Heavyweight Championship and the OVW Southern Tag Team Championship.

==== ECW Champion (2006–2008) ====
WWE aired a video presenting Punk on July 4 episode of ECW on Sci Fi, featuring a straight edge-themed promo. Punk wrestled his first televised match for the brand on August 1 at Hammerstein Ballroom, defeating Justin Credible, Punk soon entered a rivalry with Mike Knox after Knox's on-screen girlfriend Kelly Kelly displayed romantic interest in him. He defeated Knox in consecutive matches on November 7 and 14 episodes of ECW. At Survivor Series on November 26, Punk made his pay-per-view (PPV) debut in a winning effort as part of the traditional elimination match. Punk's next PPV appearance came at December to Dismember on December 3, where he was the first eliminated in the Extreme Elimination Chamber match for the ECW World Championship.

Punk suffered his first ECW singles loss on January 9, 2007, episode against Hardcore Holly. Punk later competed unsuccessfully in the WrestleMania 23 Money in the Bank ladder match on April 1. The following weeks saw Punk entangled in the New Breed vs. ECW Originals feud, initially aligning with the New Breed after being courted by both factions, turning heel in the process. Punk's heel turn proved short-lived, as he betrayed the New Breed by attacking leader Elijah Burke during a multi-man tag team match, reestablishing himself as a fan favorite. Punk defeated Burke in his first singles PPV match at Judgment Day on May 20, then closed the rivalry at One Night Stand on June 3 by teaming with Tommy Dreamer and The Sandman to defeat the New Breed in a tables match.

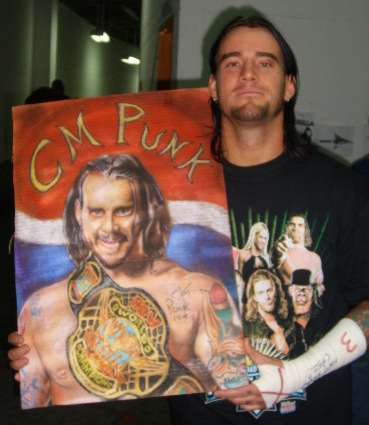
Punk (in 2008) holding a portrait of himself as the ECW Champion

Punk advanced to the tournament finals for the vacant ECW World Championship at Vengeance: Night of Champions, where Punk's scheduled opponent Chris Benoit was replaced last-minute by Johnny Nitro, who defeated Punk for the title. Punk challenged Nitro (later renamed John Morrison) in unsuccessful title matches at The Great American Bash on July 22 and SummerSlam on August 26. Punk finally captured the championship by defeating Morrison in a last chance match on September 4 episode of ECW.

Punk defended the title successfully throughout the fall, retaining against Elijah Burke at Unforgiven on September 16, overcoming Big Daddy V via disqualification at No Mercy on October 7, and defeating The Miz at Cyber Sunday on October 28. After surviving another challenge from Morrison on November 6 and a triple threat against Morrison and The Miz at Survivor Series on November 18, Punk's 143-day reign ended on January 22, 2008, episode of ECW when he lost to Chavo Guerrero in a no disqualification match following interference from Edge.

==== World Heavyweight Champion (2008–2009) ====
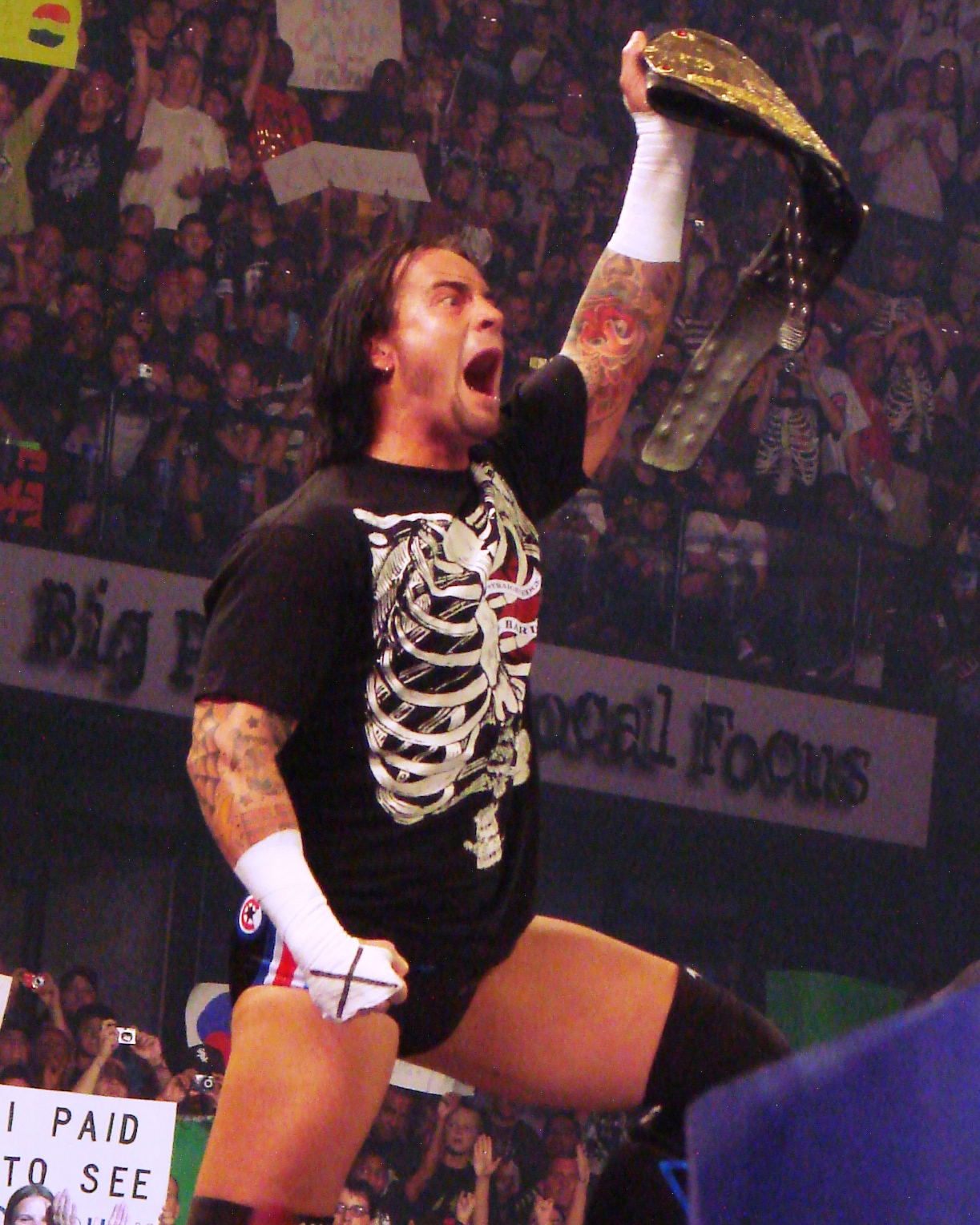
Punk as World Heavyweight Champion in August 2008

On March 30 at WrestleMania XXIV, Punk won the Money in the Bank ladder match, earning him a shot at either the WWE, World Heavyweight, or ECW titles at any time. On June 23, Punk was drafted to the Raw brand during the 2008 WWE draft and cashed in his Money in the Bank contract the following week on Raw, winning the World Heavyweight Championship from Edge. Punk continued to hold and defend the title (against the likes of Batista on July 20 at The Great American Bash and the July 21 episode of Raw, and JBL at SummerSlam on August 17) until Unforgiven on September 7, when he was attacked by The Legacy and Randy Orton, who punted Punk in the head before the Championship scramble match, ending his reign at 69 days.

On October 27 episode of Raw, Punk and Kofi Kingston defeated Cody Rhodes and Ted DiBiase to win the World Tag Team Championship, a title they held until December 13 at a live event. Then, Punk defeated William Regal for the Intercontinental Championship on January 19 episode of Raw. With this win, Punk became the 19th WWE Triple Crown Champion and the fastest ever to accomplish the feat, surpassing Kevin Nash's record of 203 days. He lost the title on March 9 episode of Raw to John "Bradshaw" Layfield.

On April 5 at WrestleMania 25, Punk won the Money in the Bank ladder match and became the first person to win the match twice. On April 13 during the 2009 WWE draft, Punk was drafted to the SmackDown brand. In the period after the draft, Punk feuded with Umaga, resulting in a Samoan strap match at Extreme Rules on June 7, which was won by Punk. Later that night, Punk cashed in his Money in the Bank contract to defeat Jeff Hardy for the World Heavyweight Championship immediately after Hardy won the title. On June 28 at The Bash, Punk retained the title even though he lost to Hardy by disqualification (because titles do not change hands on a disqualification) after kicking the referee, turning heel in the process. He lost the title to Hardy at Night of Champions, but regained at SummerSlam in a TLC match. Their feud ended on August 28 episode of SmackDown, where Punk defeated Hardy in a Steel Cage match wherein the loser agreed to leave the company. On September 13 at Breaking Point, Punk defeated The Undertaker in a submission match to retain the World Heavyweight Championship (Punk won the match with the anaconda vise when referee Scott Armstrong called for the bell despite Undertaker never submitting, reminiscent to the Montreal Screwjob). The feud between the two continued and on October 4 at Hell in a Cell, Punk lost the World Heavyweight Championship to The Undertaker in a Hell in a Cell match. Punk went on to lose two subsequent rematches for the World Heavyweight Championship against The Undertaker on October 23 SmackDown, and on October 25 at Bragging Rights in a fatal four-way match also involving Batista and Rey Mysterio.

==== Straight Edge Society (2009–2010) ====
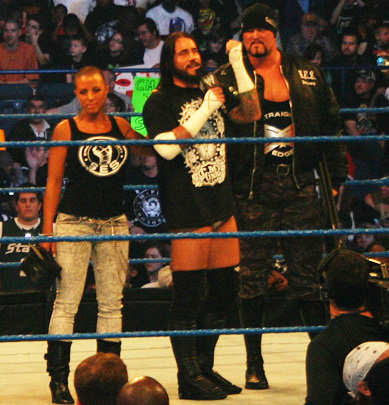
The Straight Edge Society – Serena, Punk (center), and Luke Gallows – in April 2010

In late 2009, Punk's character began taking on a more sinister direction. On November 27 episode of SmackDown, Punk revealed that he had converted Luke Gallows, who had previously been portrayed as the mentally incompetent wrestler Festus, to the straight-edge lifestyle which had subsequently rid him of his mental troubles. Throughout January 2010, Punk began to convert planted members of the audience to a straight-edge lifestyle, making them take a pledge of allegiance to him and shaving their head as a sign of renewal and devotion. After converting many people who were not seen again, convert Serena began accompanying Punk and Gallows to form The Straight Edge Society. As well as leading this alliance, Punk was also the mentor of NXT rookie Darren Young. Punk would also give sermons, including during the annual Royal Rumble match on January 31, as well as during an Elimination Chamber match for the World Heavyweight Championship on February 21 at both of the eponymous pay-per-view events.

During the first half of 2010, Punk feuded with Rey Mysterio, being eliminated by him during the Elimination Chamber match. Mysterio and Punk faced each other in a match at WrestleMania XXVI on March 28, where if Mysterio lost, he would join the Straight Edge Society, but Punk lost to Mysterio at WrestleMania. They had a rematch at Extreme Rules the following month on April 25 where Punk would have to shave his head like his disciples if he lost, but he won this match after interference from Joey Mercury, a fourth member of the Straight Edge Society. On May 23 at Over The Limit, a third and final match between Punk and Mysterio was booked with both stipulations reactivated, but Punk lost and was subsequently shaved bald. After the match, Punk began wearing a black mask, since he considered himself always pure unlike his followers and was embarrassed by his baldness.

Punk and his stable started a feud with Big Show when on July 16 episode of SmackDown, Big Show unmasked Punk. Big Show faced the Straight Edge Society in a three-on-one handicap match on August 15 at SummerSlam, winning the match after Punk abandoned his teammates. The next month, at Night of Champions on September 19, Punk lost to Big Show in a singles match. The Straight Edge Society angle ended after Serena was released from WWE and Mercury became injured, and Punk defeated Gallows in a singles match on September 24 SmackDown.

==== The New Nexus (2010–2011) ====
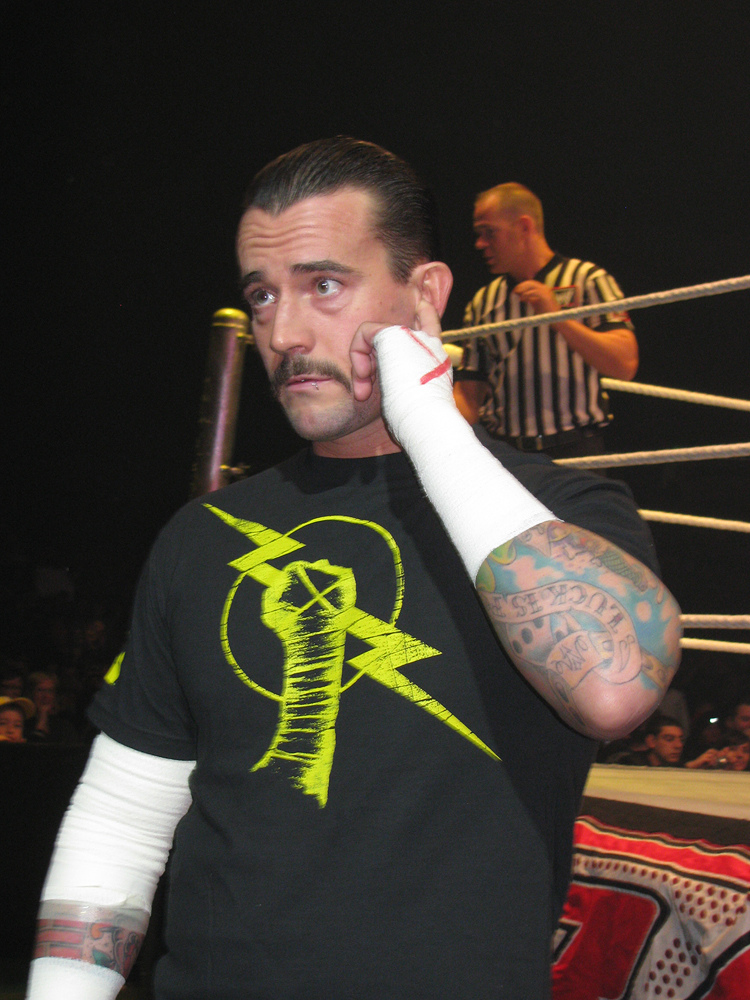
Punk in 2011 as leader of The New Nexus

On October 11 episode of Raw, Punk was traded back to the Raw brand after being swapped with Edge and took part in the interbrand tag team match on October 24 at Bragging Rights after defeating Evan Bourne to win a place, but Team Raw lost when Punk was last eliminated by Rey Mysterio. During the event, Punk suffered a hip injury that prevented him from wrestling for several months. To keep a presence on television, he began commentating on Raw on November 22.

At the end of December 2010, Punk left the commentary team after assaulting John Cena on December 20 episode of Raw and the December 21 episode of SmackDown with a chair. Punk later revealed that his motives for the attacks were that he had joined and assumed control of The Nexus. Punk then made each member of the group prove themselves worthy of a spot, with some instead choosing to join The Corre, which had been started by former Nexus leader Wade Barrett on SmackDown.

On January 30, 2011, Punk and The New Nexus cost Randy Orton his match with The Miz for the WWE Championship at the Royal Rumble as revenge for Orton prematurely ending Punk's first World Heavyweight Championship reign in 2008. In turn, Orton responded by taking out all of the New Nexus members by punting them in the head, leaving Punk alone as the sole surviving member of the group. This led to a match at WrestleMania XXVII on April 3 and a Last Man Standing match on May 1 at Extreme Rules, both of which Punk lost.

==== WWE Champion (2011–2013) ====
In June, after pinning WWE Champion John Cena on June 13 episode of Raw, Rey Mysterio at Capitol Punishment on June 19, and finally Alberto Del Rio in a number one contender's triple threat match (which also included Mysterio) all within one week, Punk revealed that his WWE contract was set to expire on July 17 at Money in the Bank and vowed to leave the company with the WWE Championship. On June 27 edition of Raw, Punk made arguably his most popular promo, a scathing, yet highly acclaimed on-air speech, often referred to as "the Pipe Bomb", concerning the way in which WWE is run and its owner Vince McMahon, as well as referencing other promotions, such as Ring of Honor and New Japan Pro-Wrestling.

John Cena, while you lay there, hopefully as uncomfortable as you possibly can be, I want you to listen to me. I want you to digest this, because before I leave in three weeks with your WWE Championship, I have a lot of things I wanna get off my chest.

I don't hate you, John. I don't even dislike you. I do like you, I like you a hell of a lot more than I like most people in the back. I hate this idea that you're the best – because you're not. I'm the best. I'm the best in the world. There's one thing you're better at than I am and that's kissing Vince McMahon's ass. You're as good at kissing Vince's ass as Hulk Hogan was. I don't know if you're as good as "Dwayne", though. He's a pretty good ass-kisser. Always was and still is. Oops – I'm breaking the fourth wall. I am the best wrestler in the world. I've been the best ever since day one when I walked into this company. And I've been vilified and hated since that day because Paul Heyman saw something in me that nobody else wanted to admit. Yeah that's right, I'm a Paul Heyman guy. You know who else was a Paul Heyman guy? Brock Lesnar. And he split, just like I'm splittin', but the biggest difference between me and Brock is that I'm going to leave with the WWE Championship.

I've grabbed so many of Vincent K. McMahon's imaginary brass rings that it's finally dawned on me that they're just that. They're completely imaginary. The only thing that's real is me. And the fact that day in and day out, for almost six years, I've proved to everybody in the world that I am the best on this microphone, in that ring, even on commentary. Nobody can touch me. And yet, no matter how many times I prove it, I'm not on your lovely little collectors' cups, I'm not on the cover of the program, I'm barely promoted, I don't get to be in movies, I'm certainly not on any crappy show on the USA Network, I'm not on the poster of WrestleMania, I'm not on the signature that's produced at the start of the show. I'm not on Conan O'Brien, I'm not on Jimmy Fallon, but the fact of the matter is I should be. And trust me, this isn't sour grapes, but the fact that "Dwayne" is in the main event of WrestleMania next year and I'm not, makes me sick!

Oh hey, let me get something straight. Those of you who are cheering me right now – you are just as big a part of me leaving as anything else, because you're the ones that are sipping out of those collector cups right now, you're the ones that buy those programs that my face isn't on the cover of, and then at five in the morning at the airport, you try to shove it in my face so that you can get an autograph and sell it on eBay, because you're too lazy to get a real job.

I'm leaving with the WWE Championship on July 17 and hell, who knows, maybe I'll go defend it in New Japan Pro Wrestling. Maybe I'll go back to Ring of Honor. Hey, Colt Cabana, how you doing? The reason I'm leaving is you people because after I'm gone you're still going to pour money into this company – I'm just a spoke on the wheel – the wheel's gonna keep turning and I understand that. But Vince McMahon's gonna make money despite himself. He's a millionaire who should be a billionaire. You know why he's not a billionaire? It's because he surrounds himself with glad-handing nonsensical douche bag yes-men like John Laurinaitis, who's gonna tell him everything that he wants to hear. And I'd like to think that maybe this company will be better after Vince McMahon is dead, but the fact is, it's gonna be taken over by his idiotic daughter and his doofus son-in-law and the rest of his stupid family.

Let me tell you a personal story about Vince McMahon. You know we do this whole bully campaign—[the microphone is turned off, Punk taps on it a few times, and then calls out without the microphone] I've been silenced!"

At Money in the Bank, Punk defeated Cena to win the WWE Championship. On July 21, Punk made a surprise appearance at a joint WWE–Mattel panel at San Diego Comic-Con, where he mocked new chief operating officer Triple H, and offered WWE Championship tournament finalist Rey Mysterio a match for the WWE Championship as long as it was in Punk's hometown of Chicago. Punk appeared at July 23's All American Wrestling show, showing respect to Gregory Iron, a wrestler with cerebral palsy. Mysterio won the WWE Championship tournament on July 25 episode of Raw only to lose it to Cena later that night. After Cena's victory, Punk, now a face, returned and upstaged Cena's celebration while also entering a title dispute. Triple H later upheld both Punk and Cena's claims to the WWE Championship as legitimate and scheduled the two to a match at SummerSlam on August 14 to decide the undisputed WWE Champion, with Triple H to serve as the special guest referee. At SummerSlam, Punk defeated Cena, but he lost the title minutes later to Alberto Del Rio, who had cashed in his Money in the Bank contract after Kevin Nash attacked Punk.

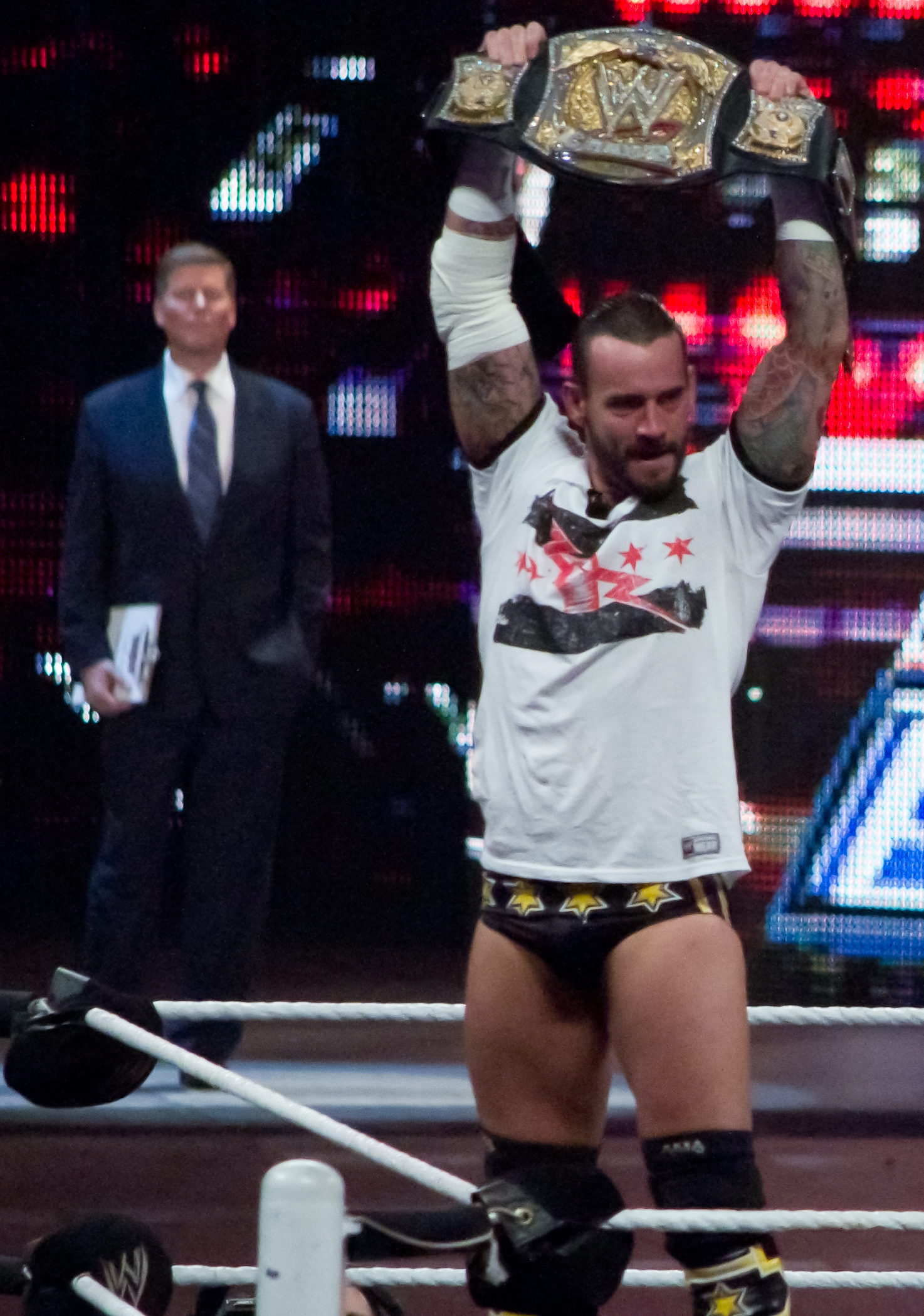
As WWE Champion, Punk (front) feuded with John Laurinaitis (background) for several months in 2011–2012.

The following months, Punk lost at Night of Champions on September 18 against Triple H, at Hell in a Cell on October 2 in a WWE Championship triple threat Hell in a Cell match, and at Vengeance on October 23 against The Miz and R-truth in a tag team match with Triple H as his partner. This helped transition Punk's anti-establishment voice from Triple H to John Laurinaitis, who, around this time, became the interim Raw general manager. Punk balked at Laurinaitis' promotion and verbally attacked him as a dull yes man. At Survivor Series on November 20, Punk defeated Del Rio to win his second WWE Championship. Punk went on to defend the title through the end of the year, retaining in a rematch with Del Rio on November 28 episode of Raw SuperShow, and then against both Del Rio and The Miz in a triple threat TLC match on December 18 at TLC: Tables, Ladders & Chairs. At the Royal Rumble on January 29, 2012, Punk successfully defended his title against Ziggler despite Laurinaitis acting as the outside enforcer.

Heading to WrestleMania, Punk started a feud with the returning Chris Jericho. Their rivalry continued through Elimination Chamber on February 19, when Punk retained the WWE Championship in the namesake structure, but while four competitors were eliminated, Jericho was unable to continue the match after being kicked out of the chamber by Punk Punk retained the title against Jericho at WrestleMania XXVIII and Extreme Rules. On May 20 at Over the Limit, Punk retained the title against Daniel Bryan. Shortly before Over the Limit, Bryan interfered in a non-title match between Punk and Kane to frame Punk for attacking Kane with a steel chair, starting a three-way rivalry. The storyline also included AJ Lee, who played the role of Bryan's ex-girfriend who turned her affections to both Punk and Kane. This feud culminated in a triple threat match on June 17 at No Way Out, where Punk managed to retain the title after AJ distracted Kane. On July 15 at Money in the Bank, Punk defeated Bryan in a no disqualification match with AJ as the special guest referee to retain the title and end the feud.

On July 23 at Raw 1000, after Punk retained the title against Money in the Bank winner John Cena, he turned heel when he attacked The Rock. At SummerSlam, Punk retained against Cena and Big Show. Punk also was joined by Paul Heyman as his manager. On September 16 at Night of Champions, Punk retained the WWE Championship after he fought Cena to a draw. He also retained the title at Hell in a Cell against Ryback, ending Ryback's thirty-eight match undefeated streak.

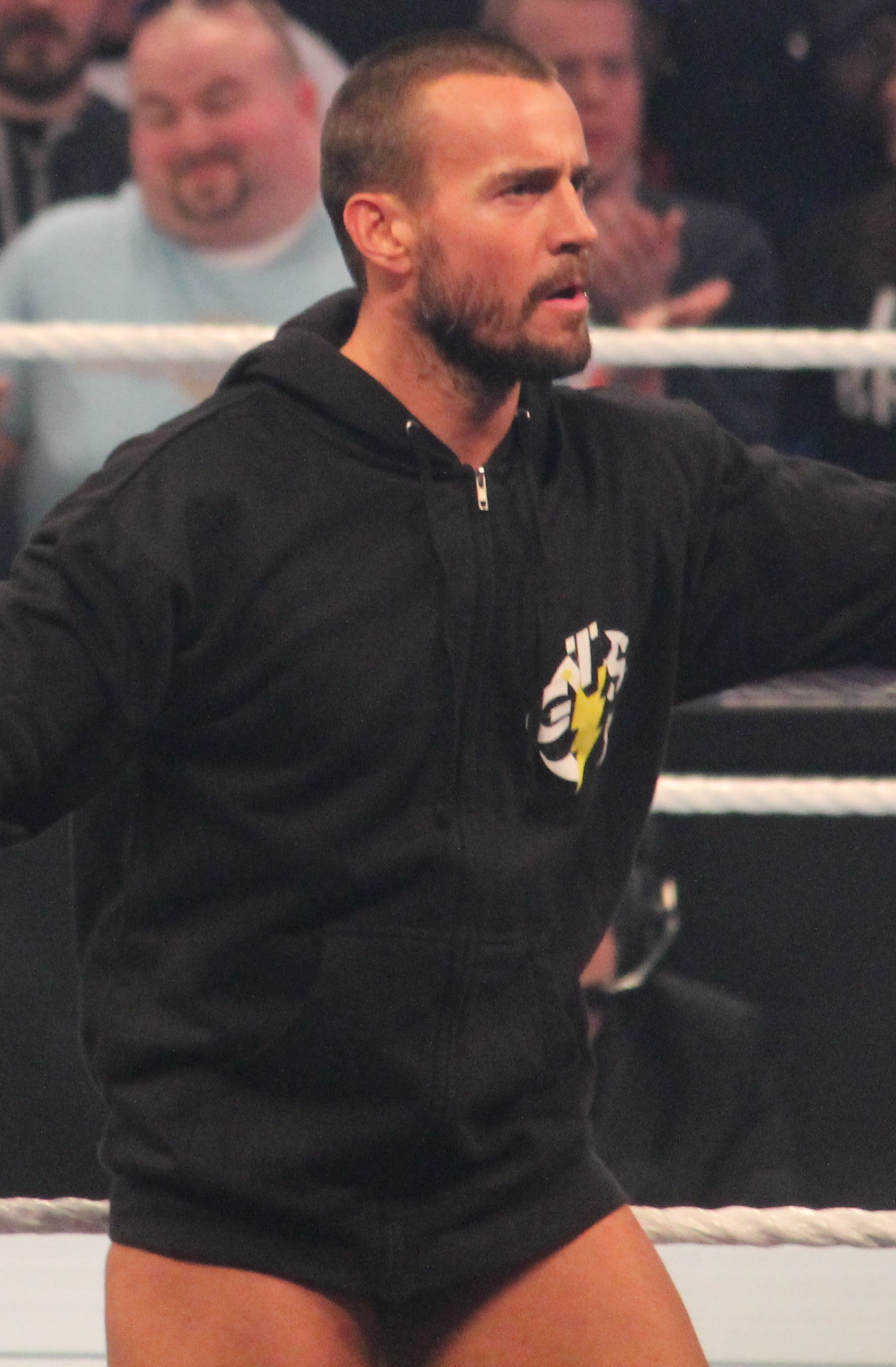
Punk at the 2013 Elimination Chamber

Att Survivor Series on November 18 in a Survivor Series match, Punk won a triple threat match against Cena and Ryback after an interference from the debuting faction The Shield (Dean Ambrose, Roman Reigns and Seth Rollins), officially hold the championship for one full year. On December 4, Punk underwent surgery to repair a partially torn meniscus, removing him from his scheduled title match against Ryback on December 16 at TLC: Tables, Ladders & Chairs. Despite his injury, Punk became the longest-reigning WWE Champion in the past 25 years on December 5, surpassing John Cena's 380-day reign. Punk returned to in-ring action on January 7, 2013, episode of Raw, retaining the WWE Championship against Ryback in a TLC match following interference from The Shield.

Punk's 434 days reign ended at Royal Rumble when he lost it to The Rock. WWE recognized this reign as the longest world championship reign in WWE of the "modern era" (after 1988) until Universal Champion Brock Lesnar broke that record in June 2018. Punk received a title rematch with The Rock on February 17 at Elimination Chamber, but Punk lost.

==== Final storylines (2013–2014) ====
On March 4 episode of Raw, Punk defeated Big Show, Randy Orton and Sheamus in a fatal four-way match to earn the right to face The Undertaker at WrestleMania 29 on April 7. After the real-life death of Paul Bearer, The Undertaker's former manager the next day, a somewhat controversial storyline involving Punk regularly spiting The Undertaker through displays of flippancy and disrespect towards Bearer's death began, including Punk stealing Bearer's trademark urn. At WrestleMania, Punk was defeated by The Undertaker. Punk then took a two-month hiatus away from WWE television to recover from injuries.

Punk returned at Payback on June 16, defeating Chris Jericho. Punk started a storyline where he told Heyman to no longer accompany him to his matches and was later attacked by Heyman's other client Brock Lesnar, thus turning Punk face once again. This led to a No Disqualification match between Punk and Lesnar at SummerSlam on August 18, which Punk lost. His feud with Heyman continued during the following months, facing his other clients Curtis Axel and Ryback. The feud ended at Hell in a Cell on October 27, where Punk defeated Heyman and Ryback in a two-on-one handicap Hell in a Cell match, with Punk pinning Ryback and after the match performing a "Go to Sleep" to Heyman on top of the cell.

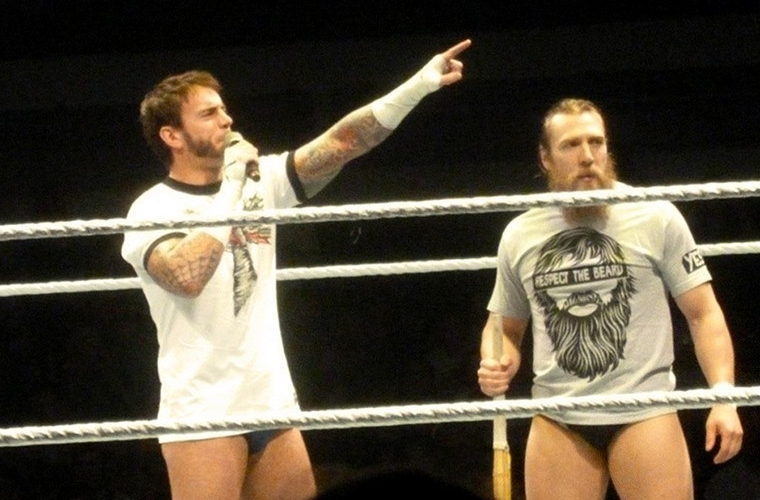
Punk (left) allied himself with Daniel Bryan heading into Survivor Series in 2013.

Punk moved on to a feud with The Wyatt Family (Bray Wyatt, Erick Rowan and Luke Harper), forming an alliance with Daniel Bryan, with the duo defeating Harper and Rowan in a tag team match on November 24 at Survivor Series. Punk then wrestled the three members of The Shield at TLC: Tables, Ladders & Chairs, a match Punk won. At the Royal Rumble, Punk entered number 1 and, near the end of the match, Kane, who was already eliminated earlier in the match by Punk, eliminated Punk from the outside and proceeded to perform a chokeslam on him through the announce table.

==== Initial retirement (2014) ====
I was sick and hurt and burnt out, and I walked. And I can do that because I'm an independent contractor.

— In a December 2014 interview, Punk explains why he left WWE earlier that year

Punk did not appear on January 27 episode of Raw, nor did he appear at the SmackDown taping on Tuesday despite being advertised for both events. By Wednesday, WWE.com stopped advertising Punk for future events. The Wrestling Observer reported that on Monday and prior to Raw, Punk had legitimately walked out after telling Vince McMahon and Triple H that he was "going home". On February 20 during a conference call to investors, McMahon said Punk was "taking a sabbatical". On March 3 episode of Raw, which took place in Punk's hometown of Chicago, WWE acknowledged his absence on television for the first time when the show started with Punk's entrance music playing, only for former manager Paul Heyman to walk out to a loud chorus of boos. WWE then proceeded to remove Punk from footage of their promotional videos. This lasted until the first half of July, where WWE used footage of Punk to promote the WWE Network. In an interview published in late May, Punk was asked how it felt "to be retired at 35" and replied that "it feels good". On July 15, WWE.com officially moved Punk from the active roster to the alumni section of their page without releasing a statement. On the same day, Punk thanked his fans without mentioning WWE. In late July, Punk said that he was "never ever" going to return to wrestling.

When Punk told [another] doctor that he wrestled with a staph infection for three months, Punk said [that] doctor told him: "You should be dead. You could have died".

— The Pro Wrestling Torch documents the Punk interview released in November 2014

On an episode of Colt Cabana's Art of Wrestling podcast released in November 2014, Punk finally broke his silence regarding his exit from WWE. In a detailed interview, Punk said that he was suspended for two months after walking out on WWE in January and that after the suspension ended, nobody from WWE contacted him. Punk also said WWE executives gave him a run-around when he reached out to them for unpaid royalties until he was ultimately handed his termination papers and was fired by WWE on his wedding day on June 13, 2014. The manner of firing was the last straw for Punk, stating that he would never return to WWE and that there would be no further working relationship between him and WWE following a legal settlement. The settlement included Punk giving WWE permission to sell his remaining merchandise.

Punk cited his health as the main reason he left WWE, describing that during his final months in WWE, he had been working through an untreated and potentially fatal MRSA infection (Punk later acknowledged on the witness stand that he was not diagnosed with an MRSA staph infection, but that a physician's assistant said he exhibited certain symptoms consistent with an ordinary staph infection), broken ribs, injured knees and multiple concussions, including one at the 2014 Royal Rumble, as well as having lost his appetite and ability to sleep well. Punk felt that WWE was pressuring and rushing him to wrestle before fully recovering. According to Punk, he found a lump on his back in November 2013, and it was diagnosed as a "fatty deposit" by Dr. Chris Amann, who refused to remove it despite Punk's repeated requests. The week after Punk left WWE, his wife April Mendez convinced him to get the lump checked by her doctor. The doctor told Punk that he could have died due to ignoring it for such a long time. Punk had the doctor evacuate the infection, describing it as the worst pain in his life, but said that once it was treated and he was on stronger medication, he was able to sleep better than he had in months.

Other sources of unhappiness Punk had with WWE were his failure to main event a WrestleMania (deeming his entire career to be a failure as a result), being paid less than the other wrestlers in the three most significant matches of WrestleMania 29, doing favors for Vince McMahon and not being owed back, being "creatively stifled", feeling that there were no long-term plans for wrestlers other than John Cena, as well as receiving less pay and not getting answers as to how the advent of the WWE Network would affect wrestlers' salaries. Lastly, Punk described having left with "zero passion" for wrestling and described himself at the time of the interview to be the happiest he had ever been in many years. Less than one week later, while being interviewed on The Steve Austin Show on the WWE Network, Vince McMahon apologized to Punk for the manner of his termination, which he regarded as an unfortunate coincidence due to a lack of communication within WWE. McMahon also said that he was open to working with Punk again. In a second Art of Wrestling podcast, Punk publicly rejected McMahon's apology, brushing it off as "insincere" and a "publicity stunt" as McMahon did not contact him directly to apologize and could have apologized much earlier.

=== Post-retirement appearances (2015, 2019–2020) ===
Punk's first known appearance at a professional wrestling event following his exit from WWE was at a Freelance Wrestling show on December 4, 2015, titled "Raw Power". Draped in a cloak and referred to by announcers as Kikutaro's "nameless mentor", Punk managed Kikutaro in a match against Darin Corbin and Dick Justice. He tossed around salt before the match but did not get involved in the match itself. On April 19, 2019, Punk appeared in a masked disguise at an event held by independent promotion MKE Wrestling, where he helped Ace Steel win a match by attacking his opponent with the GTS. While it was implied to be Punk by promotion owner Silas Young, nothing was confirmed by Punk.

On November 12, 2019, Punk made a surprise appearance on the Fox Sports 1 series WWE Backstage. He subsequently joined the program as a special contributor and analyst. Punk accepted the job because he would be under contract with Fox instead of WWE directly, and hoped it would help him find his way back into the wrestling business. Regarding an in-ring return, he was not interested but not opposed to the idea, noting it was "a bridge that is gonna have to be built." Production of WWE Backstage was halted due to the COVID-19 pandemic and subsequently suspended by Fox in June 2020, later being canceled as a series entirely by 2021.

=== All Elite Wrestling (2021–2023) ===
==== Initial debut and AEW World Champion (2021–2022) ====
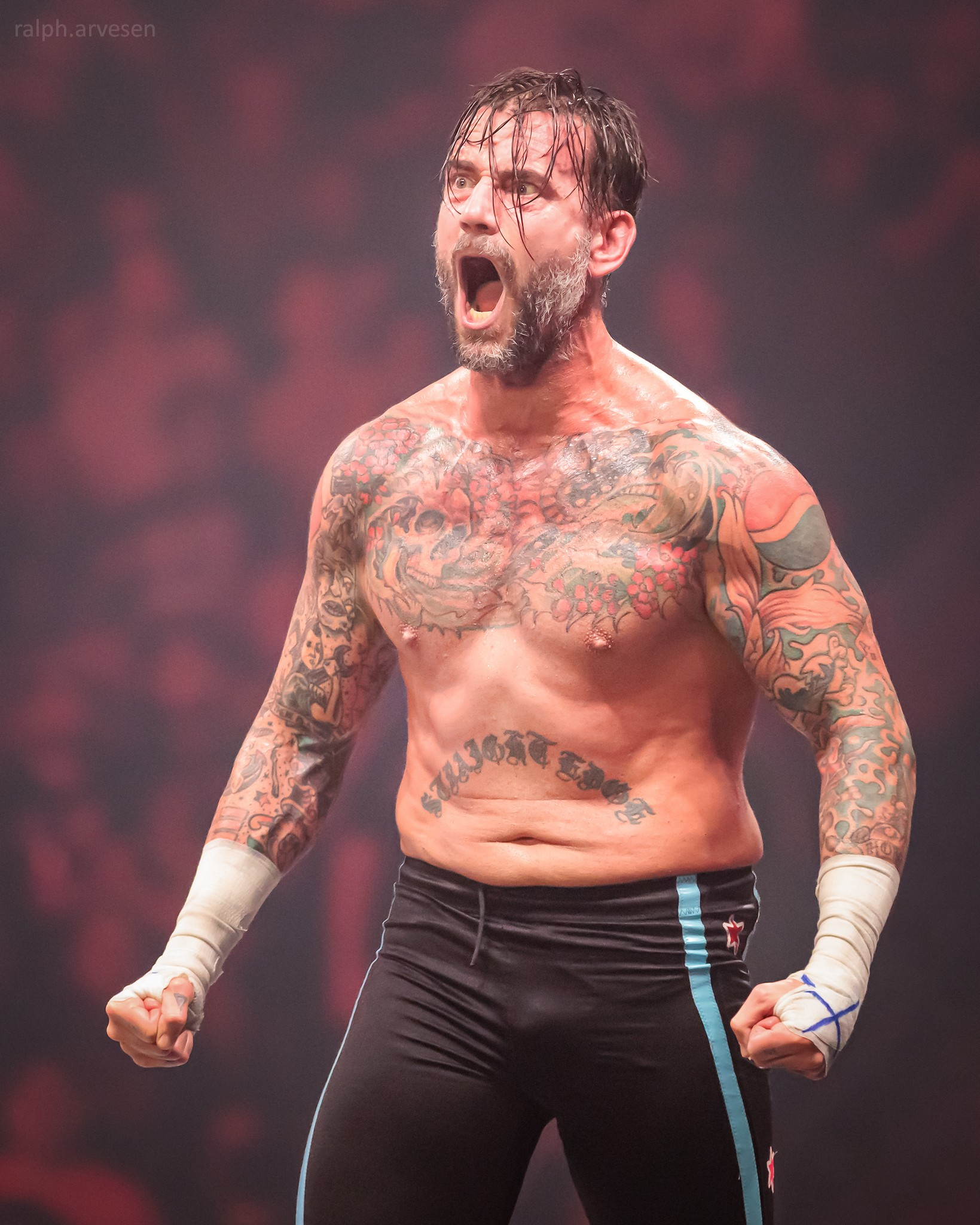
Punk in March 2022

On August 20, 2021, Punk made his debut for All Elite Wrestling (AEW) at The First Dance event on Rampage, challenging Darby Allin to a match at the All Out pay-per-view event. This marked Punk's official return to professional wrestling after a seven-year retirement. Wrestling journalist Dave Meltzer said, "Punk's appearance in his home city drew one of the most amazing audience reactions to a pro wrestler in U.S. history. The reaction was compared to Montreal's reaction to Hulk Hogan in 2002 shortly after his WWE return, or the reaction to Triple H in Madison Square Garden a few months before that upon his return from a torn quad." Punk won the match against Allin at All Out on September 5. Following a brief feud with Eddie Kingston, whom Punk defeated at Full Gear on November 13, Punk experienced his first loss in AEW to MJF in a singles match on February 2, 2022, episode of Dynamite after months of feuding between the two. Punk defeated MJF on March 6 at Revolution in a Dog Collar match.

At Double or Nothing on May 29, Punk defeated Adam Page to win the AEW World Championship. Five days after winning the title, Punk announced on June 3 episode of Rampage that he was taking a hiatus from competing to recover from a foot injury, but that he would remain champion. Jon Moxley was crowned as interim champion in Punk's place at AEW x NJPW: Forbidden Door on June 26. At the Quake by the Lake special episode of Dynamite on August 10, Punk made his return and confronted Moxley, igniting a title dispute. A match to determine the undisputed AEW World Champion took place on August 24 episode of Dynamite, which Moxley won quickly. After accepting Moxley's open challenge for anyone to face him on September 4 at All Out, Punk defeated Moxley at All Out to win the AEW World Championship for the second time.

==== Suspensions and departure (2022–2023) ====
"My relationship with Scott Colton ended long before I paid all of his bills. I have every receipt, I have every invoice, I have every email. I have the email where he says, and I quote; 'I agree to go our separate ways. I will get my own lawyer and you do not have to pay anymore.' That's an email that I have, and the only reason the public did not see it is because when I finally had to countersue him through discovery, we discovered he shared a bank account with his mother. That's a fact. And as soon as we discovered that fact and we subpoenaed old Marsha, he sent the email; 'Oh, can we please drop all this?'. Now, it's 2022, I haven't been friends with this guy since at least 2014, late 2013, and the fact that I have to sit up here because we have irresponsible people who call themselves EVPs and couldn't fucking manage a Target, and they spread lies and bullshit, and, and put into the media that I got somebody fired when I have fuck all to do with [Colton]. Want nothing to do with him. Do not care where he works, where he doesn't work, where he eats, where he sleeps, and the fact that I have to get up here and do this in 2022 is fucking embarrassing. And if y'all are at fault, fuck you. If you're not, I apologize. But, what did I ever do in this world to deserve an empty-headed fucking dumbfuck like "Hangman" Adam Page to go out on national television and fucking go in to business for himself, for what? What did I do, Dave? What did I ever do? Didn't do a goddamn thing."

— Punk shooting on Colt Cabana and The Elite ("Hangman" Adam Page and AEW executive vice presidents Kenny Omega and The Young Bucks (Matt Jackson and Nick Jackson)) during the All Out post-event media scrum on September 4, 2022

During the All Out post-event media scrum, Punk addressed rumors that he had attempted to get Colt Cabana fired from AEW, accused AEW's executive vice presidents and wrestlers Kenny Omega and The Young Bucks (Matt and Nick Jackson) of spreading those rumors and leaking them to wrestling media, and referenced a segment in which he says Page went "into business for himself" prior to their match in May. Omega and The Young Bucks, along with head of AEW legal, Megha Parekh, approached Punk about his comments backstage, which led to a legitimate altercation. Punk, Omega, and The Young Bucks all received consequent suspensions pending investigation. Later that week, the AEW World Championship was announced as having been vacated. Around the same time, Punk underwent surgery to repair his left triceps after tearing it during his match at All Out. On his conduct at the media scrum, Punk later said that he privately apologized to AEW CEO and president Tony Khan, while also stating that "didn't approach it in the right manner" and that he was "disappointed" and "hurt", as he had sensed that he had just suffered another injury.

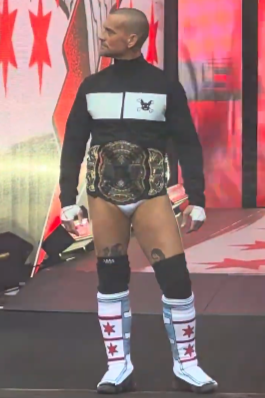
Punk making his entrance as the "Real World Champion" at All In in August 2023, in what would be his final AEW appearance

After a nine-month absence, Punk made his return to AEW on the premiere episode of Collision on June 17, 2023, teaming with FTR (Cash Wheeler and Dax Harwood) to defeat Samoa Joe, Jay White, and Juice Robinson in a six-man tag team match. That same month, he entered the men's Owen Hart Cup tournament, defeating Satoshi Kojima in the first round at Forbidden Door. Punk won over Joe in the semifinals and lost to Ricky Starks in the final round on July 15 after Starks grabbed the ropes for leverage to get the pin. On July 29 edition of Collision, Punk unveiled the AEW World Championship belt that he had won in September 2022, declaring himself the real world champion and stated that he still rightfully held the title since he was never defeated for it. He then spray-painted his signature "X" symbol over the belt. Punk successfully defended the "Real World Championship" against Starks on August 5 Collision episode, with Ricky "the Dragon" Steamboat serving as the special outside enforcer. At All In on August 27, he successfully defended the "Real World Championship" against Joe in what would be his final AEW match.

After All In, it was reported that Punk had been involved in a legitimate backstage altercation with Jack Perry regarding comments Perry made during his match earlier in the show, itself a reference to Punk denying Perry's request to use real glass in his segments on Collision. After an investigation into the altercation was conducted by AEW, Punk was terminated from his AEW contract for just cause on September 2.

Punk later contradicted Khan's claim of firing him for just cause, stating in an April 2024 interview on The MMA Hour with Ariel Helwani that he initially wanted to leave AEW entirely rather than have Collision be a show revolving around him and not the Elite, and that after the altercation with Perry, he told Khan to his face, "You're a fucking clown, I quit." Punk also further criticized AEW stating that it is "not a real business" and "not about making money". Punk also went on to claim that no one from AEW had spoken to him in six months after the altercation at All Out in September 2022, and that he was forced to pay for his own surgery and do recovery on his own. Footage of the backstage altercation with Perry was shown on April 10, 2024, episode of Dynamite as way to further the feud between The Young Bucks and FTR, with the latter being real-life friends with Punk.

=== Return to WWE (2023–present) ===
==== Feuds with Drew McIntyre and Seth Rollins (2023–2025) ====
At the conclusion of Survivor Series: WarGames in the Chicago metropolitan area on November 25, 2023, Punk made a surprise return to WWE in his first appearance in WWE since 2014 (discounting his appearances on Fox's WWE Backstage in 2019). According to reporters present at the event, his return was greeted by "one of the loudest pops of all time". He signed with the Raw brand on December 11 episode of WWE Raw, where he announced his entry into the Royal Rumble match. Punk's first matches back with WWE were against "Dirty" Dominik Mysterio, during the WWE Live Holiday Tour, first at Madison Square Garden in New York City on December 26, then at the Kia Forum in Inglewood, California on December 30, which were both won by Punk.

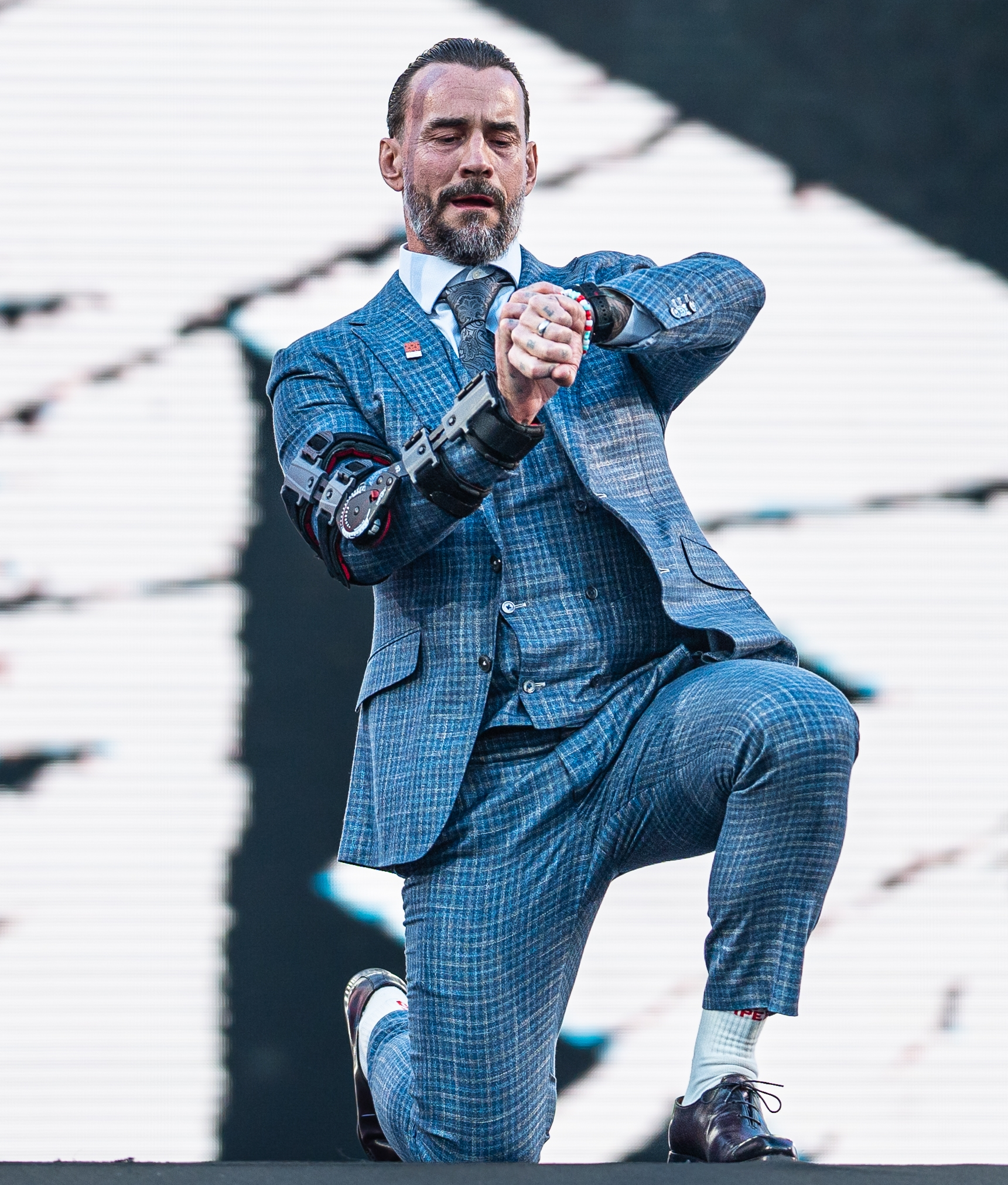
Punk at WrestleMania XL in April 2024

On January 27, 2024, at the Royal Rumble, Punk wrestled his first televised WWE match since 2014, entering at number 27 during the Royal Rumble match, in which he was the runner-up after being eliminated by Cody Rhodes. During the match, Punk tore his right triceps, rendering him unable to compete at WrestleMania XL, thus forcing the cancellation of a planned match between Punk and World Heavyweight Champion Seth "Freakin" Rollins at the event. The injury was later turned into a storyline between Punk and Drew McIntyre, with McIntyre continuously mocking Punk for causing his injury. Punk retaliated by attacking McIntyre after the latter won the World Heavyweight Championship at WrestleMania XL in April, allowing Damian Priest to successfully cash in his Money in the Bank contract, at Clash at the Castle: Scotland in McIntyre's home country in June, and at Money in the Bank in July, when McIntyre attempted to cash in after winning the eponymous ladder match. Punk and McIntyre then had a trilogy of matches, the first at SummerSlam with Rollins as the special guest referee where Punk lost, the second at Bash in Berlin where Punk won in a strap match, and the third and final match at Bad Blood, where Punk defeated McIntyre in a Hell in a Cell match, ending their nearly ten-month trilogy feud. This storyline received critical acclaim, winning Best Feud awards by Wrestling Observer Newsletter, ESPN, Pro Wrestling Illustrated, and Sports Illustrated; the Hell in a Cell match between them was also highly acclaimed, being rated five stars by Wrestling Observer Newsletter.

After a short hiatus, Punk made his return at the conclusion of the November 22 episode of SmackDown, as the fifth member of Roman Reigns' team at Survivor Series: WarGames alongside the returning Paul Heyman. At the event on November 30, Punk, Reigns, Sami Zayn, and The Usos defeated Bronson Reed and The Bloodline (Solo Sikoa, Jacob Fatu, Tama Tonga, and Tonga Loa) in a WarGames match. On the debut episode of Raw on Netflix, on January 6, 2025, Punk wrestled his first match on Raw in almost eleven years, where he defeated Seth Rollins.

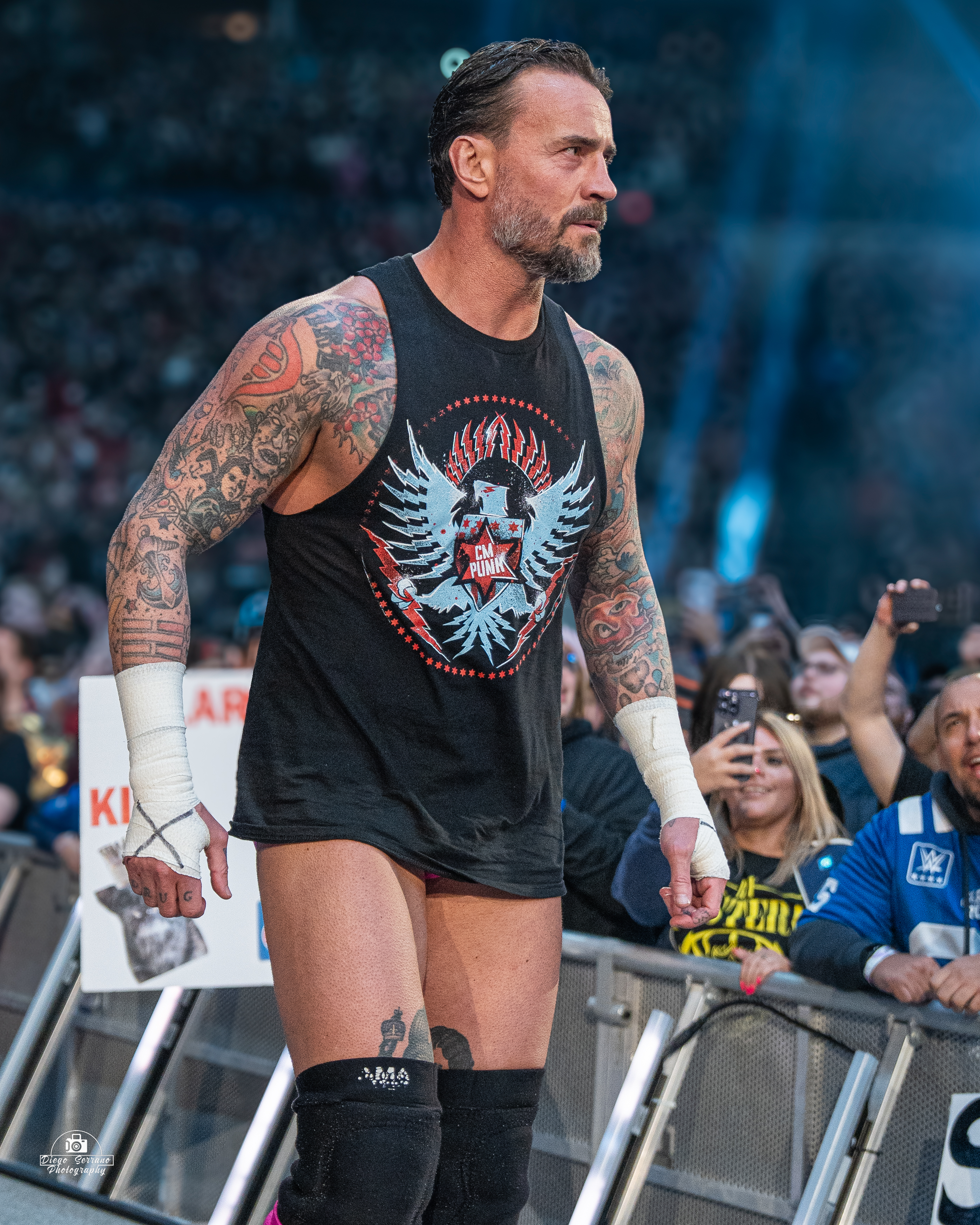
Punk at the Royal Rumble in February 2025

At the Royal Rumble on February 1, Punk entered the titular match at #24 and made it to the final four before being eliminated by Logan Paul and getting into an altercation with Rollins and Roman Reigns, both of whom he had eliminated. At Elimination Chamber: Toronto, he lost the Elimination Chamber match to John Cena after being attacked by an already eliminated Rollins. At WrestleMania 41, Punk wrestled in his first WrestleMania main event when he faced, along with Paul Heyman, Rollins and Reigns in a triple threat match. Rollins defeated Punk and Reigns following a double betrayal by Paul Heyman, who aligned himself with Rollins in the process.

After being taken out by Rollins and Bron Breakker on April 21 episode of Raw, Punk returned on May 5 episode of Raw, costing Rollins the World Heavyweight Championship. On June 9 episode of Raw, Punk confronted the now villainous Undisputed WWE Champion John Cena for a title match, which was scheduled for Night of Champions in Saudi Arabia on June 28, At the event, Punk failed to win the title from Cena after interference from Rollins.

==== World championship reigns (2025–present) ====
On July 14 episode of Raw, Punk won a gauntlet match for the right to challenge Gunther for the World Heavyweight Championship at SummerSlam. In the main event of Night 1 of SummerSlam on August 2, Punk defeated Gunther to win the title. However, he immediately lost the title to Seth Rollins, who cashed in his Money in the Bank briefcase, ending Punk's reign at only five minutes and ten seconds, marking the shortest reign in the title's history. At Clash in Paris on August 31, Punk failed to regain the title from Rollins in a fatal four-way match also involving Jey Uso and LA Knight after interference from Rollins' wife, Becky Lynch. At Wrestlepalooza on September 20, Punk teamed with his wife AJ Lee to defeat Rollins and Lynch in a mixed tag team match.

Punk defeated Jey Uso at Saturday Night's Main Event XLI on November 1 to win the vacant World Heavyweight Championship. After Punk was pinned by Bron Breakker at Survivor Series: WarGames during the WarGames match, he retained the title to Breakker at the Raw on Netflix Anniversary Show on January 5. On January 24 episode of Raw, he retained the championship against AJ Styles via disqualification after being attacked by Bálor during his defense. At Elimination Chamber on February 28 in his hometown of Chicago, Punk defeated Bálor in a rematch to retain the title. On April 19 at the main event of Night 2 of WrestleMania 42, Punk lost the title to Royal Rumble winner Roman Reigns, ending his second reign at 169 days.

After a two-month hiatus, Punk made a surprise return on July 6 episode of Raw in his hometown of Chicago where he defeated Sami Zayn to win his third WWE Championship (being referred to at the time as the Undisputed WWE Championship). Following his title win, Punk was transferred to the SmackDown brand. On July 10 episode of SmackDown, Punk started a feud with Cody Rhodes challenging him at SummerSlam for the title which was then made official. At Saturday Night's Main Event XLV on July 18, Punk and Rhodes defeated Gunther and Zayn for their match at SummerSlam to remain a singles match. At the event on Night 1, Punk successfully retained the title against Rhodes after interference from a returning Randy Orton. On August 21 episode of SmackDown, Punk defeated Kevin Owens to retain the title after interference from Zayn, who also attacked Punk after the match. On the September 11 edition of SmackDown, Punk lost the title back to Zayn ending his third reign at 67 days.

== Professional wrestling persona ==
Punk adopted his real-life following of the straight-edge movement as a major attribute of his professional wrestling character. The character utilizes different elements of Punk's personality and beliefs of the straight-edge movement dependent on his alignment. While portraying a crowd favorite, Punk's character tends to be that of his normal personality, largely indifferent to others who drink alcohol, smoke tobacco, partake in recreational drug use, or have promiscuous sexual behavior, but emphasizing the social discipline involved with personally abstaining from these behaviors. Conversely, his villainous personality tends to be one who is hardline or militant straight edge, exemplifying the elitist attitudes and superiority complexes – defined by Punk's common mantra during villainous-themed promos that because he is straight edge, he is "better than you". Punk performs the straight-edge symbol of crossing his arms in an X formation while having the letter X written on the back of his hands, usually drawn on his wrist tape. During his WWE career, Punk also incorporated a belligerently anti-establishment and anti-corporate attitude into his persona.

Originally, the initials CM in his ring name represented the phrase "Chick Magnet", the name of the tag team he was in as a backyard wrestler. However, Punk later changed CM into a pseudo-acronym, declaring that it has no meaning, although when asked since he has taken to making up meanings that fit the initials, going so far as to make up long stories to explain the origins that do not match the actual origin story. Since beginning this practice, Punk has stated that, among others, CM stands for "Chick Magnet", "Cookie Monster", "Crooked Moonsault", "Chuck Mosley", "Charles Montgomery", "Charles Manson", "Charlie Murphy", and "Chicago Made". During his entrance, Punk yells, "It's clobberin' time!", a reference to New York City hardcore punk band Sick of It All, who wrote a song with the same name and Marvel's fictional character The Thing. As his entrance theme, Punk uses the song "Cult of Personality" by Living Colour, with which he is often associated.

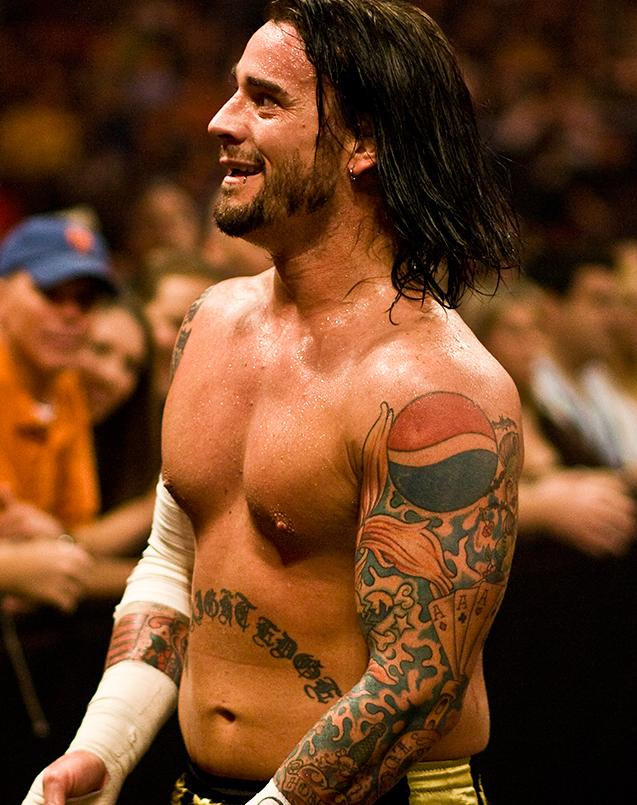
Punk in 2008; prominently visible are the Pepsi Globe tattoo on his left shoulder, the "luck is for losers" sleeve tattoo on his left arm, and the "straight edge" tattoo across his stomach

An integral part of Punk is the numerous tattoos that adorn his body, some of which have become symbols associated with Punk and mantras and declarations that have been integrated into his gimmick. The tattoos as a whole, due to their large quantity and variety, have also become an attribute identifiable to Punk. The most important of the individual tattoos in Punk's character – whether through association, symbol, or mantra – are the following:

- A Pepsi Globe logo on his left shoulder that inspired the names of two of his signature moves. It also became a symbol of Punk himself, who wore the logo on his ring gear in the independent circuit as well as a slightly modified Pepsi logo being used as part of his TitanTron entrance video. Punk, a keen Pepsi drinker, chose to receive a Pepsi tattoo to emphasize his straight edge beliefs. The tattoo is also a reference to former Minor Threat guitarist Brian Baker, who had a Coca-Cola tattoo and explained this by saying "I like Coca-Cola". When people inquire about Punk's Pepsi tattoo, he often replies "I like Pepsi" in a similar fashion.
- The words "Straight Edge" are spelled out on Punk's stomach. This is one of his oldest tattoos and he has referred to it as his identity.
- A sleeve tattoo on his left arm that reads "luck is for losers" and features numerous good luck symbols, including a rabbit's foot, four-leaf clover and a horseshoe. The tattoo also features four ace playing cards as a tribute to trainer Ace Steel.
- The phrase "No gimmicks needed" on the back of his left hand, a tribute to deceased wrestler Chris Candido.
- The words "Drug Free" across his knuckles ("Drug" on his right knuckles and "Free" on his left).
- His younger sister's jersey number (31) behind his left ear, surrounded by stars, each of which represents his siblings as a way to bond away from home.
- The Cobra Command logo (G.I. Joe's enemy) on his right shoulder. Punk is known for his love of comic books, considering them along with jazz and professional wrestling as three of the original arts that America has given to the world.

=== Legacy ===
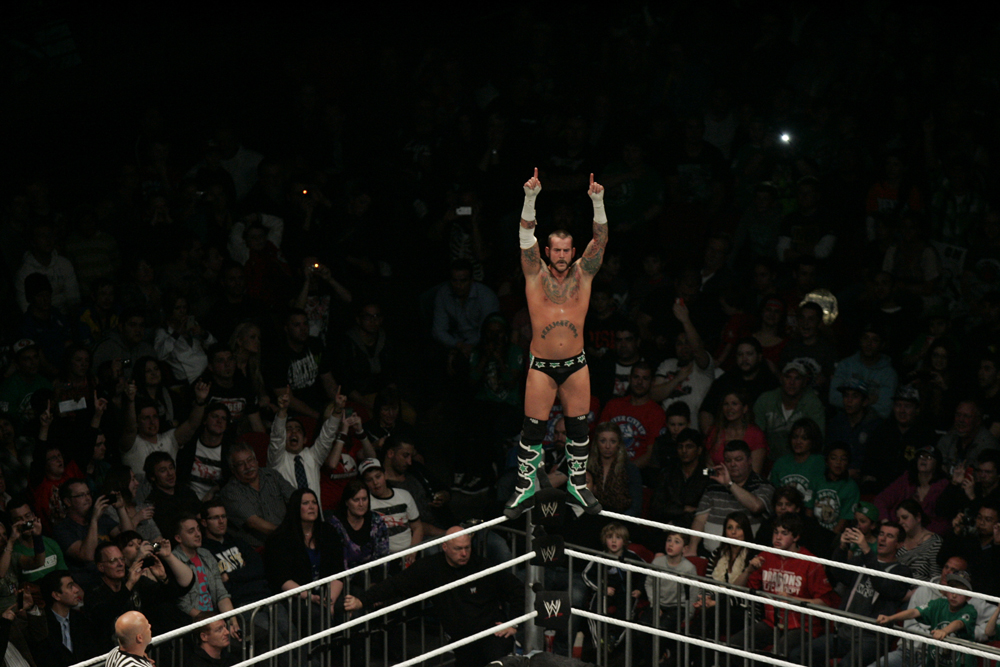
Punk about to perform his signature diving elbow drop, paying homage to Randy Savage.

Punk is regarded as one of the most influential performers of his generation. He is credited with being one of the first independent wrestlers to have a successful run in WWE, which in turn opened the door for other independent wrestlers to both join and succeed in the company. Several wrestlers such as Seth Rollins, Rhea Ripley, and Adam Cole have publicly cited Punk as an inspiration or influence on their careers.

Punk has been described as one of the 20 best speakers in wrestling history, with his in-ring promos drawing positive comparisons to WWE's adult-oriented Attitude Era. His "Pipe Bomb" soliloquy from June 2011 is considered one of the most important promos in the history of professional wrestling. Although much of his time as a top star in WWE was during its PG Era, Erik Beaston of Bleacher Report wrote that "Punk turned the company on its head for a few short years and gave fans a taste of what an alternative to the advertiser-obsessed promotion could look like."

== Mixed martial arts career ==
CM Punk
- Height: 6 ft 2 in (1.88 m)
- Weight: 170 lb (77 kg)
- Division: Welterweight
- Reach: 73 in (185 cm)
- Team: Roufusport
- Teachers: Head coach: Duke Roufus; Brazilian Jiu-Jitsu: Daniel Wanderley
- Rank: Blue belt in Brazilian Jiu-Jitsu under Daniel Wanderley

Mixed martial arts record
- Total: 2
- Wins: 0
- Losses: 1
- By submission: 1
- No contests: 1

Other information
- Mixed martial arts record from Sherdog

=== Ultimate Fighting Championship (2014–2021) ===
At UFC 181, on December 6, 2014, Punk announced that he had signed a multi-fight contract with Ultimate Fighting Championship (UFC). When asked if he would compete under his ring name or birth name, he told the Las Vegas Sun: "I've come this far with CM Punk. That's what people know. I'm trying to stick with that. I'm not shying away from it. I'm not ashamed of it." His UFC profile listed him as his ring name.

In January 2015, Punk began training under Duke Roufus at Roufusport MMA Academy. In June 2015, Punk moved to Milwaukee, Wisconsin to be closer to the Roufusport gym while still retaining his home in Chicago. Later, it was announced that Punk would compete in the welterweight division. In October 2015, Roufus announced that Punk had suffered a shoulder injury, delaying his UFC debut until the next calendar year. On February 6, 2016, it was announced that Punk would face Mickey Gall in his first professional mixed martial arts (MMA) contest, but he was diagnosed with a herniated disc and underwent surgery days later.

Punk's UFC and MMA debut against Mickey Gall took place on September 10, 2016, at UFC 203. The event was held at the Quicken Loans Arena in Cleveland, Ohio, the same venue where Punk left WWE and retired from professional wrestling. Punk was taken down immediately and lost via rear naked choke submission early in the first round. He was paid a disclosed $500,000 (equivalent to $670,757 in 2025).

Punk's second professional bout took place at UFC 225 on June 9, 2018, against Mike Jackson, in his hometown of Chicago. Punk, despite securing a takedown in the first round, lost the fight by unanimous decision. After the bout, UFC president Dana White said that both Punk and Jackson would probably not fight for the UFC again, and urged Punk to "call it a wrap". In 2019, Punk stated that he wasn't seriously considering a UFC return. Although he believed White would permit him a third fight, Punk said if he were to fight again it would be at a lower level, citing his 0–2 professional record. Three years after the bout, it was made public that the result was overturned to a no contest, returning each man's record back to 0–1, after Mike Jackson tested positive for marijuana.

Despite his inactivity and statements by White, Punk was never formally removed from the UFC roster, or released from his contract, and remained a part of the drug testing pool for the UFC until pulling out in December 2020. In August 2021, Punk notified the UFC he would be retiring from MMA after he returned to professional wrestling earlier that month. Punk ended his MMA run with a record of 0–1 (1 NC). Punk's MMA career has been widely panned by MMA fans and personalities.

=== Cage Fury Fighting Championships (2018) ===
On November 8, 2018, Punk signed with Cage Fury Fighting Championships (CFFC), a UFC affiliate, as a commentator. His first event was CFFC 71 on December 14 and it was streamed live on UFC Fight Pass.

== Other media ==
As an actor, Brooks starred in the 2019 horror film Girl on the Third Floor. Dennis Harvey of Variety and Michael Phillips of the Chicago Tribune respectively described his performance as "a fun star turn that easily carries most of the film" and "solid if a little unvarying". Brooks portrayed wrestler Ricky Rabies in the professional wrestling drama series Heels (2021–2023).

Brooks wrote the introduction for the hardcover edition of Marvel Comics' 2012 crossover event Avengers vs. X-Men and described the opportunity as a "geek dream come true". In 2013, Brooks wrote a foreword for his friend and ex-girlfriend Natalie Slater's cookbook Bake and Destroy: Good Food for Bad Vegans. In February 2015, Marvel Comics' Thor Annual No. 1, partly written by Brooks, was released. He cowrote "The Most Cursed", which appeared in Vertigo Comics' Strange Sports Stories No. 3 in May 2015. Brooks also cowrote Marvel Comics' Drax ongoing series. Brooks wrote a one-shot of Marvel's Master of Kung Fu, which was published in November 2017.

Brooks was the cover athlete for the 2012 video game WWE '13 and the 2026 video game WWE 2K26. Brooks appeared alongside his friend and Brazilian Jiu-Jitsu coach Rener Gracie in several episodes of the YouTube series Gracie Breakdown. He also worked with Nerdist Industries, including hosting the series Grammar Slam, where he explained grammatical mistakes in messages from professional wrestling fans and berated them. Brooks appeared as the Sports Grand Marshal of the nationally televised McDonald's Thanksgiving Parade in downtown Chicago in 2008 and 2012. He threw out the ceremonial first pitch at a Chicago Cubs game in September 2025.

== Personal life ==
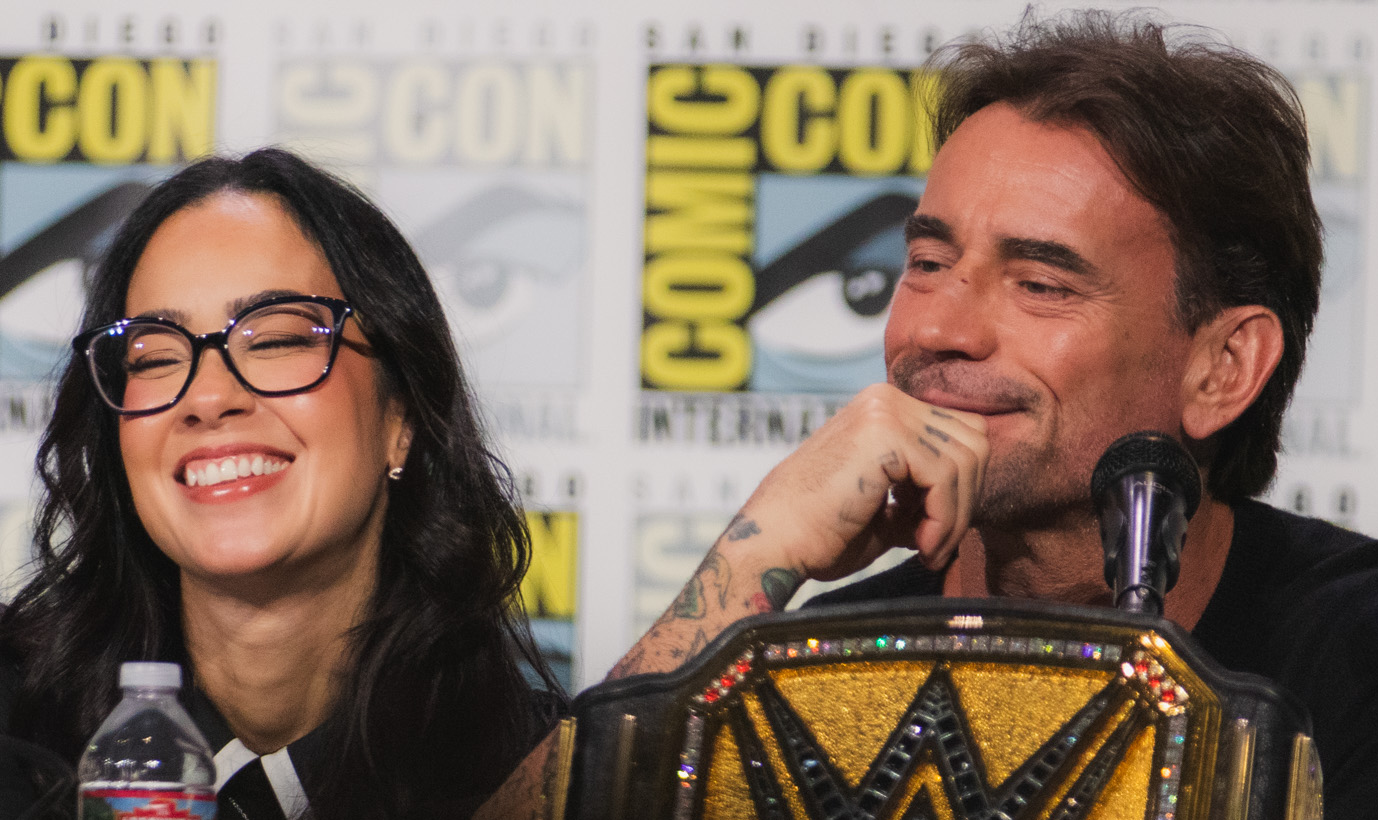
Brooks with his wife AJ Lee at San Diego Comic-Con in July 2026.

Brooks began dating fellow WWE wrestler April Mendez, better known as AJ Lee, in August 2013, and they married on June 13, 2014. They split their time between homes in Los Angeles and his native Chicago. They had a dog, Larry, who died in 2025. Brooks is a lifelong fan of various sports teams from his hometown, especially the Chicago Blackhawks and the Chicago Cubs. He is straight edge and an atheist. He also identifies as pro-choice, feminist, and a supporter of the Black Lives Matter movement, LGBTQ rights, and Palestine. Brooks is a fan of hardcore and punk music, he has stated that some of his favorite bands are Rancid, H2O, Madball and Against Me.

In February 2015, WWE doctor Christopher Amann filed a defamation lawsuit against Brooks and Scott Colton over Brooks' allegations of medical malpractice on an episode of Colton's podcast. Amann sought roughly $4,000,000 (equivalent to $5,433,000 in 2025) in compensation and an undisclosed amount in punitive damages. WWE issued a statement and video in support of Amann. The case went to trial in 2018, where a jury ruled in favor of Brooks and Colton. In August 2018, Colton filed a lawsuit against Brooks, alleging breach of contract and fraud due to Brooks' alleged agreement and later refusal to pay Colton's legal fees for the Amann suit. Colton sought $200,000 (equivalent to $256,427 in 2025) in damages and an additional $1 million (equivalent to $1,282,000 in 2025) in punitive damages. Brooks filed a counterclaim against Colton in June 2019, for $600,000 (equivalent to $755,564 in 2025) and additional fees. Both lawsuits were settled and dismissed in September 2019. According to PWInsider, the settlement involved no financial compensation.

== Filmography ==
Key
†	Denotes films that have not yet been released

=== Film ===
Film appearances
Year	Title	Role	Notes	Ref.
2013	Queens of the Ring	Himself		
2015	The Flintstones & WWE: Stone Age SmackDown!	CM Punkrock	Voice role	
2019	Girl on the Third Floor	Don Koch		
2019	Rabid	Billy		
2021	Jakob's Wife	Deputy Colton		
2024	Let's Start a Cult	Robbie		
2025	Night Patrol	Deputy		
2025	Zootopia 2	Zebro Zebrowski	Voice role	
2026	Guarding Stars †	Doghouse	Filming	

=== Television ===
Television appearances
Year	Title	Role	Notes	Ref.
2004	Monster Garage	Himself	Episode: "Box Truck Wrestling Car"	
2006	Ghost Hunters	Himself	Episode: "Live Halloween Special: Stanley Hotel"	
2011	Jimmy Kimmel Live!	Himself	1 episode	
2012	Late Night with Jimmy Fallon	Himself	1 episode	
2012–2014	Talking Dead	Himself	3 episodes	
2014–2015	Maron	Himself	2 episodes	
2016	The Evolution of Punk	Himself	Documentary mini-series	
2017	The Challenge: Champs vs. Pros	Himself	Reality competition	
2018	Ultimate Beastmaster	Himself	United States co-host; season 3	
2019–2020	WWE Backstage	Himself	5 episodes	
2021–2023	Heels	Ricky Rabies	Recurring; 6 episodes	
2022–2023	Mayans M.C.	Paul	Recurring (seasons 4–5); 4 episodes	
2025	WWE LFG	Himself	Guest mentor; 1 episode	
2025	Revival	Anthony "Tony" Check	Recurring role	
2026	R.J. Decker	Mike	1 episode	

=== Video games ===
Video game appearances
Year	Title	Notes	Ref.
2007	WWE SmackDown vs. Raw 2008	Video game debut	
2008	WWE SmackDown vs. Raw 2009		
2009	WWE SmackDown vs. Raw 2010		
2010	WWE SmackDown vs. Raw 2011		
2011	WWE All Stars		
2011	WWE '12		
2012	WWE WrestleFest	Downloadable content	
2012	WWE '13	Cover athlete	
2013	WWE 2K14		
2014	WWE 2K15		
2016	EA Sports UFC 2	MMA video game debut	
2018	EA Sports UFC 3		
2020	EA Sports UFC 4		
2023	AEW Fight Forever		
2024	WWE 2K24	Downloadable content	
2025	WWE 2K25		
2026	WWE 2K26	Cover athlete	

=== Music videos ===
Music video appearances
Year	Title	Artist	Ref.
2015	"The Next Storm"	Frank Turner	
2025	"Here Comes Santa Claus (Right Down Santa Claus Lane)"	Jill Schoelen	

== Luchas de Apuestas record ==
Winner (wager)	Loser (wager)	Location	Event	Date	Notes
Rey Mysterio (stable pledge)	CM Punk (hair)	Detroit, Michigan	Over the Limit	May 23, 2010	

== Mixed martial arts record ==
Professional record breakdown
2 matches	0 wins	1 loss
By submission	0	1
No contests	1	

Res.	Record	Opponent	Method	Event	Date	Round	Time	Location	Notes
NC	0–1 (1)	Mike Jackson	NC (overturned)	UFC 225	June 9, 2018	3	5:00	Chicago, Illinois, United States	Originally a unanimous decision win for Jackson; overturned after he tested positive for marijuana.
Loss	0–1	Mickey Gall	Submission (rear-naked choke)	UFC 203	September 10, 2016	1	2:14	Cleveland, Ohio, United States	

== Championships and accomplishments ==
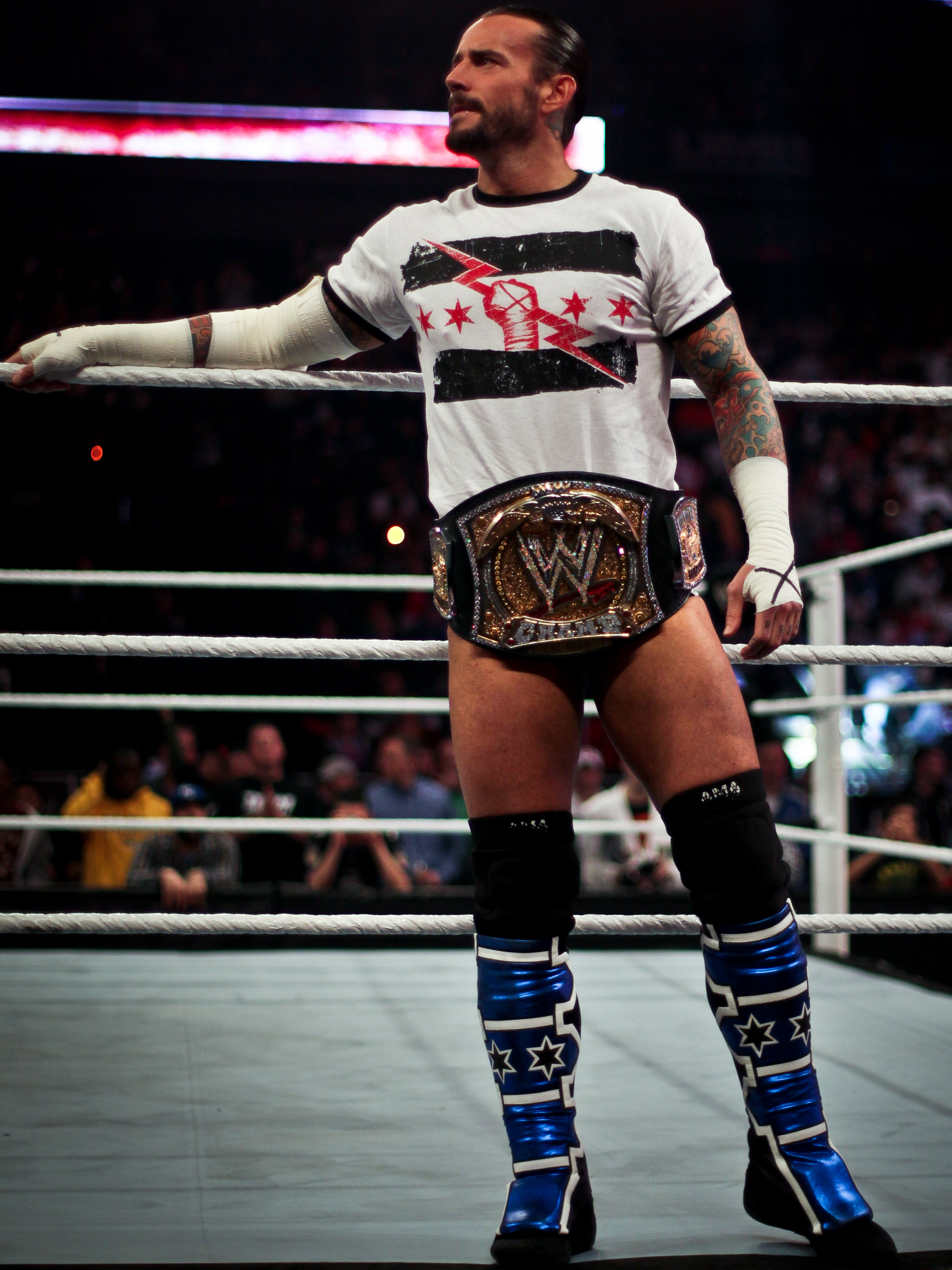
Punk is a three-time WWE Champion, with his second reign of 434 days being the seventh longest in the history of the title.

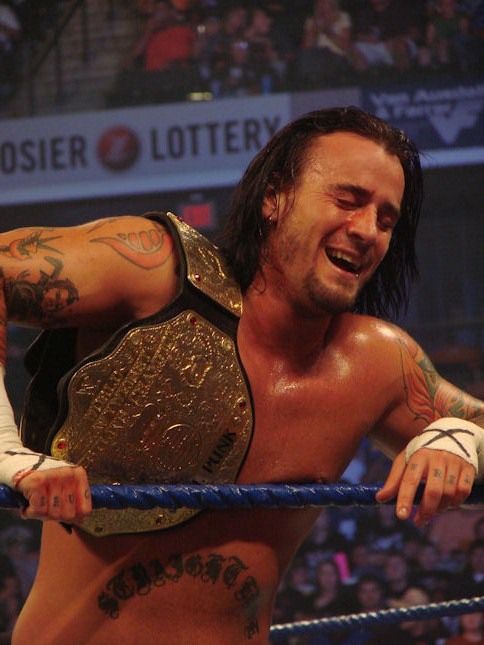
Punk won the 2002–2013 version of the World Heavyweight Championship three times

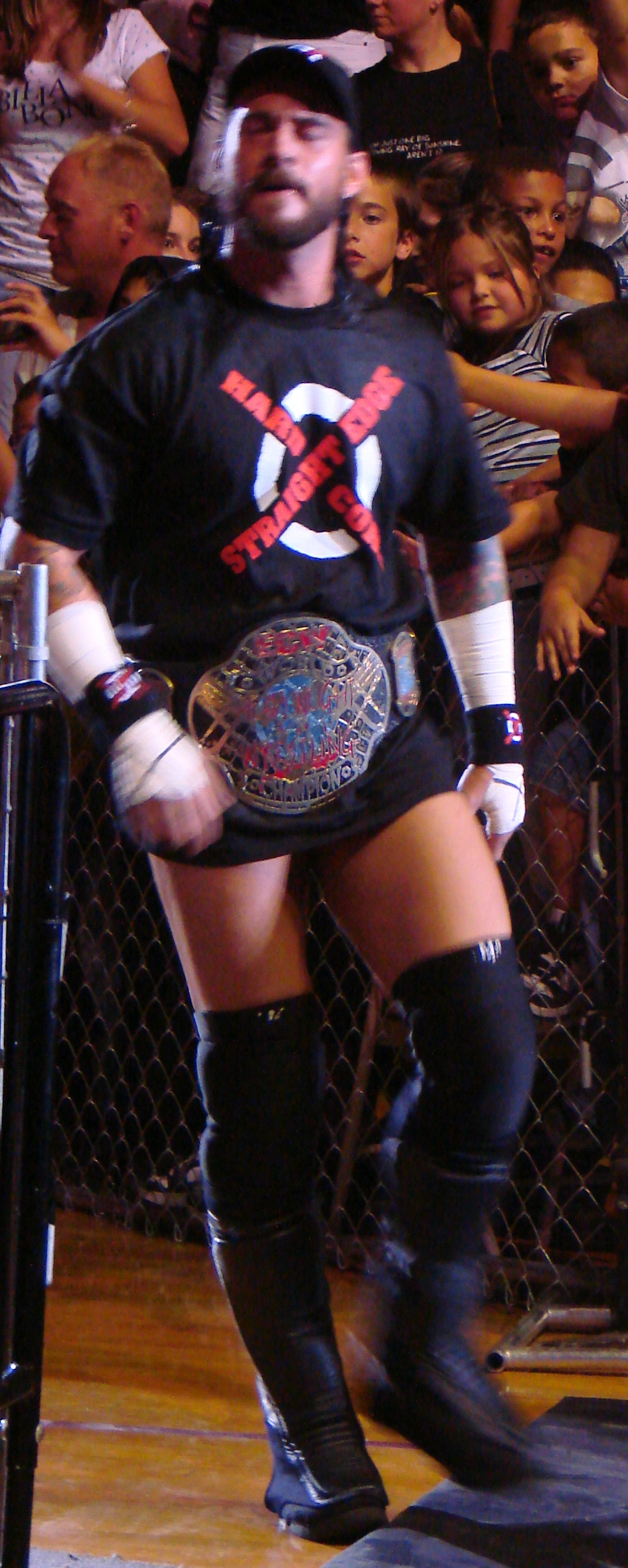
Punk's first title in WWE was the ECW Championship.

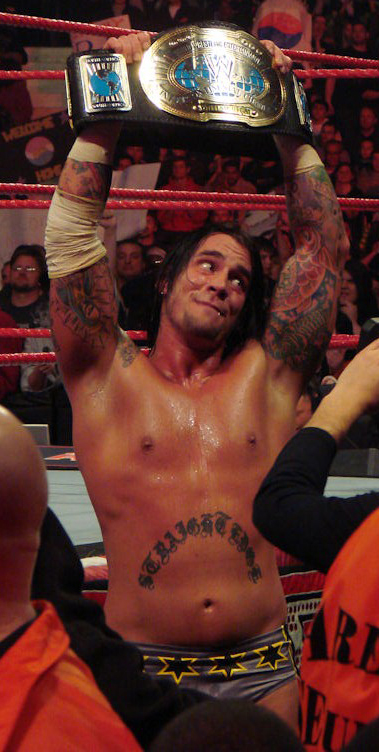
Punk is a one-time WWE Intercontinental Champion

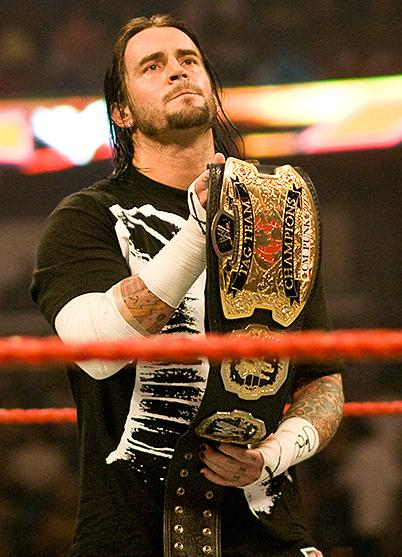
Punk is also a one-time World Tag Team Champion with Kofi Kingston.

- All Elite Wrestling
  - AEW World Championship (2 times)
  - "Real World Championship" (1 time, unrecognized)
  - AEW Awards (2 times)
    - Best Moment on the Mic (2022) – CM Punk returns
    - Best Mic Duel (2022) – MJF and CM Punk on Thanksgiving Eve
- The Baltimore Sun
  - Feud of the Year (2009) – vs. Jeff Hardy
- Cauliflower Alley Club
  - Iron Mike Mazurki Award (2023)
- ESPN
  - Best Feud/Storyline of the Year (2024) – vs. Drew McIntyre
  - Debut of the Year (2023)
- Independent Wrestling Association Mid-South
  - IWA Mid-South Heavyweight Championship (5 times)
  - IWA Mid-South Light Heavyweight Championship (2 times)
- International Wrestling Cartel
  - IWC World Heavyweight Championship (1 time)
- Lunatic Wrestling Federation
  - LWF Intercontinental Championship (2 times)
- Mid-American Wrestling
  - Mid-American Wrestling Heavyweight Championship (1 time)
- New York Post
  - Best Return/Debut of the Year (2023)
- NWA Cyberspace
  - NWA Cyberspace Tag Team Championship (1 time) – with Julio Dinero
- Ohio Valley Wrestling
  - OVW Heavyweight Championship (1 time)
  - OVW Southern Tag Team Championship (1 time) – with Seth Skyfire
  - OVW Television Championship (1 time)
- Pro Wrestling Illustrated
  - Comeback of the Year (2021)
  - Feud of the Year (2011) – vs. John Cena
  - Feud of the Year (2022) – vs. Maxwell Jacob Friedman
  - Feud of the Year (2024) – vs. Drew McIntyre
  - Feud of the Year (2025) – vs. Seth Rollins
  - Match of the Year (2011) – vs. John Cena at Money in the Bank
  - Most Hated Wrestler of the Year (2012)
  - Most Popular Wrestler of the Year (2011, 2021)
  - Wrestler of the Year (2011, 2012)
  - Ranked No. 1 of the top 500 singles wrestlers in the PWI 500 in 2012
- Revolution Championship Wrestling
  - RCW Championship (1 time)
- Revolver
  - Golden Gods Award for Most Metal Athlete (2012)
- Ring of Honor
  - ROH World Championship (1 time)
  - ROH Tag Team Championship (2 times) – with Colt Cabana
  - ROH Hall of Fame (Class of 2022)
- Sports Illustrated
  - Rivalry of the Year (2024) – vs. Drew McIntyre
  - Ranked No. 17 of the 20 Greatest WWE Wrestlers of All Time
- St. Paul Championship Wrestling / Steel Domain Wrestling
  - SPCW Northern States Light Heavyweight Championship (2 times)
- World Wrestling Entertainment / WWE
  - Undisputed WWE Championship (Note: In his first two reigns, the title was called the WWE Championship.) (3 times) (Note: Punk held the title concurrently with Rey Mysterio and John Cena during his first reign. After defeating Cena, Punk became the undisputed champion, but he was not recognized by WWE as having won the title a second time.)
  - World Heavyweight Championship (current version) (2 times)
  - World Heavyweight Championship (2002–2013 version) (3 times)
  - ECW World Heavyweight Championship (1 time)
  - WWE Intercontinental Championship (1 time)
  - World Tag Team Championship (1 time) – with Kofi Kingston
  - Money in the Bank (2008, 2009)
  - 19th Triple Crown Champion
  - Slammy Award (11 times)
    - Despicable Me (2010) – Harassing Rey Mysterio and his family
    - Extreme Moment of the Year (2013) – For exacting revenge on Paul Heyman at Hell in a Cell
    - Match of the Year (2025) – Hell in a Cell match vs. Drew McIntyre at Bad Blood (tied with Roman Reigns vs. Cody Rhodes at WrestleMania XL)
    - OMG Moment of the Year (2008) – Cashing in Money in the Bank to win the World Heavyweight Championship
    - OMG Moment of the Year (2024) – Returning to WWE at Survivor Series: WarGames
    - "Pipe Bomb" of the Year (2011)
    - Return of the Year (2024) – At Survivor Series: WarGames
    - Rivalry of the Year (2025) – vs. Drew McIntyre
    - Shocker of the Year (2009) – Forcing Jeff Hardy out of the WWE after steel cage match victory
    - Superstar of the Year (2011)
    - T-shirt of the Year (2011) – "Best in the World"
- WrestleCrap
  - Gooker Award (2023) – CM Punk in AEW (tied with Father James Mitchell doing drugs on PPV)
- Wrestling Observer Newsletter
  - Best Box Office Draw (2021)
  - Best Gimmick (2009, 2011)
  - Best on Interviews (2011, 2012)
  - Feud of the Year (2009) – vs. Jeff Hardy
  - Feud of the Year (2011) – vs. John Cena
  - Feud of the Year (2024) – vs. Drew McIntyre
  - Most Charismatic (2021)
  - Most Disgusting Promotional Tactic (2012) – Exploiting Jerry Lawler's legitimate heart attack
  - Most Disgusting Promotional Tactic (2013) – Exploiting the death of Paul Bearer
  - Pro Wrestling Match of the Year (2011) – vs. John Cena at Money in the Bank
  - Wrestling Observer Newsletter Hall of Fame (Class of 2025)
