= List of TNA World Champions =

Listing of professional wrestling champions for the Impact World Championship

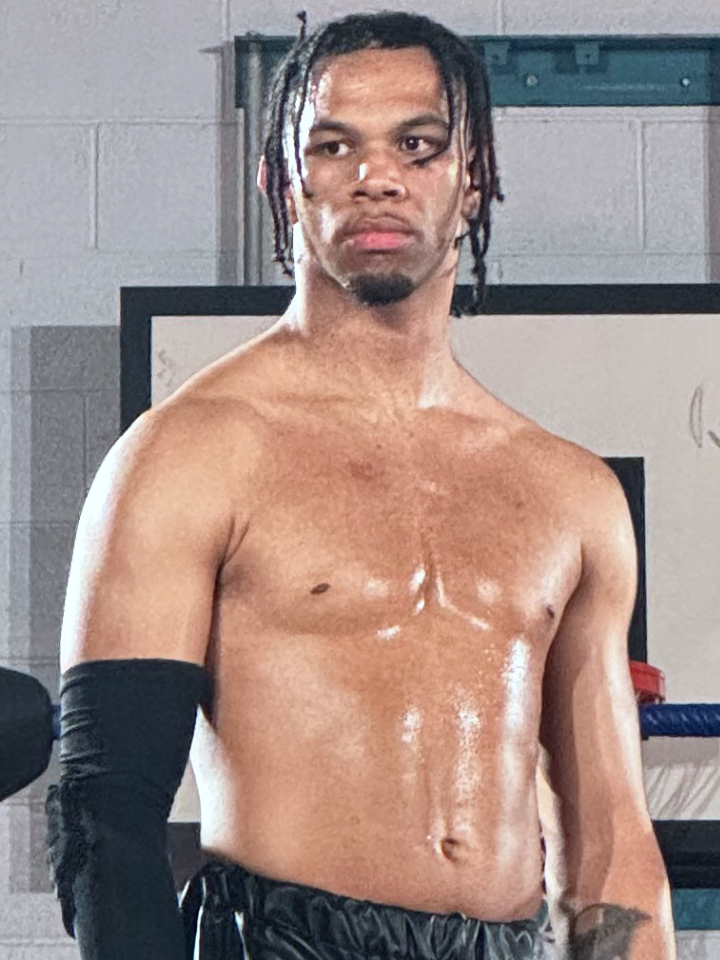
Current champion Leon Slater

The TNA World Championship is a professional wrestling world heavyweight championship owned by the promotion Total Nonstop Action Wrestling (TNA). From June 2002 to May 2007, TNA used the NWA World Heavyweight Championship as their primary championship as part of an agreement with the National Wrestling Alliance (NWA). On May 13, 2007, the NWA abruptly ended the arrangement and retrieved control of the NWA World Heavyweight Championship. On the same night, TNA were set to host their annual Sacrifice pay-per-view event, in which the NWA World Heavyweight Championship was to be defended by then-champion Christian Cage against Kurt Angle and Sting in a three-way match. Angle won the match and on the following episode of TNA's television program Impact! on May 17, was declared the new TNA World Heavyweight Champion. He was stripped of the championship later in the program, with Management Director Jim Cornette citing a problematic finish to the title match. The ownership of the championship was decided on June 17, 2007, at TNA's Slammiversary event in a King of the Mountain match involving Angle and Cage along with A.J. Styles, Chris Harris and Samoa Joe, which Angle won.

Despite the championship being primarily contested for by male wrestlers, it was once won by a woman, Tessa Blanchard. Being a professional wrestling championship, the title is won via a scripted ending to a match or awarded to a wrestler because of a storyline. Reigns that began on Impact Wrestling usually air on tape delay and as such are listed with the day the tapings occurred, rather than the air date. Angle holds the record for most reigns, with six. At 335 days, Josh Alexander's second reign is the longest in the title's history. Alexander's first reign holds the record for shortest reign in the title's history at only a few minutes. Overall, there have been 67 reigns shared among 40 wrestlers, with seven vacancies.

Leon Slater is the current champion in his first reign. He won the title by defeating Nic Nemeth in his Option C title opportunity at Bound for Glory on October 11, 2026, in Tampa, Florida.

== Title history ==
=== Names ===
Name	Years
TNA World Heavyweight Championship	May 13, 2007 – March 1, 2017
Impact Wrestling World Heavyweight Championship	March 2, 2017 – July 2, 2017
Unified GFW World Heavyweight Championship	July 2, 2017 - August 17, 2017
GFW Global Championship	August 17, 2017 - September 18, 2017
Impact Global Championship	September 18, 2017 - January 10, 2018
Impact World Championship	January 10, 2018 - March 13, 2021
Impact Unified World Championship	March 13, 2021 - March 16, 2021
Impact World Championship	March 16, 2021 - January 13, 2024
TNA World Championship	January 13, 2024 – Present

=== Reigns ===
For a list of world champions in TNA between 2002 and 2007, see the list of NWA World Heavyweight Champions.

As of November 8, 2026.

Key
No.	Overall reign number
Reign	Reign number for the specific champion
Days	Number of days held
+	Current reign is changing daily

No.	Champion	Championship change			Reign statistics		Notes	Ref.
No.	Champion	Date	Event	Location	Reign	Days	Notes	Ref.
Total Nonstop Action Wrestling (TNA)
1	Kurt Angle	May 13, 2007	Sacrifice	Orlando, FL	1	1	Defeated former NWA Champion Christian Cage and Sting in a three-way match. Due to National Wrestling Alliance's (NWA) agreement with TNA ending that night, NWA stripped Cage of the title earlier that day and Angle was crowned the inaugural TNA World Heavyweight Champion.	
—	Vacated	May 14, 2007	Impact!	Orlando, FL	—	—	Kurt Angle was stripped of the title due to a double-fall result in a three-way match at Sacrifice. Aired on tape delay on May 17.	
2	Kurt Angle	June 17, 2007	Slammiversary	Nashville, TN	2	119	This King of the Mountain match also featured A.J. Styles, Chris Harris, Christian Cage, and Samoa Joe. Angle's first reign and the vacancy were no longer recognized; thus, this is viewed as the start of the title's lineage. TNA unexplainably credited Angle's previous reign, giving loose recognition towards that reign.	
3	Sting	October 14, 2007	Bound for Glory	Duluth, GA	1	2		
4	Kurt Angle	October 16, 2007	Impact!	Orlando, FL	3	180	Aired on tape delay on October 25.	
5	Samoa Joe	April 13, 2008	Lockdown	Lowell, MA	1	182	This was a Six Sides of Steel Title vs. Career match.	
6	Sting	October 12, 2008	Bound for Glory IV	Hoffman Estates, IL	2	189	This was a no countout match.	
7	Mick Foley	April 19, 2009	Lockdown	Philadelphia, PA	1	63	This was a Six Sides of Steel match.	
8	Kurt Angle	June 21, 2009	Slammiversary	Auburn Hills, MI	4	91	This King of the Mountain match also featured A.J. Styles, Jeff Jarrett, and Samoa Joe.	
9	A.J. Styles	September 20, 2009	No Surrender	Orlando, FL	1	211	This five-way match also featured Hernandez, Matt Morgan, and Sting.	
10	Rob Van Dam	April 19, 2010	Impact!	Orlando, FL	1	113		
—	Vacated	August 10, 2010	Impact!	Orlando, FL	—	—	The title was vacated due to Rob Van Dam's storyline injury. Aired on tape delay on August 19.	
11	Jeff Hardy	October 10, 2010	Bound for Glory	Daytona Beach, FL	1	91	Defeated Kurt Angle and Mr. Anderson in a three-way tournament final to win the vacant title. Per the stipulation, Angle was forced to retire in kayfabe.	
12	Mr. Anderson	January 9, 2011	Genesis	Orlando, FL	1	35		
13	Jeff Hardy	February 13, 2011	Against All Odds	Orlando, FL	2	11	This was a ladder match.	
14	Sting	February 24, 2011	Impact!	Fayetteville, NC	3	108	Aired on tape delay on March 3. On the May 3 tapings of Impact, TNA announced their rebrand as Impact Wrestling (aired on tape delay on May 12).	
15	Mr. Anderson	June 12, 2011	Slammiversary IX	Orlando, FL	2	29		
16	Sting	July 11, 2011	Impact!	Orlando, FL	4	27	Aired on tape delay on July 14.	
17	Kurt Angle	August 7, 2011	Hardcore Justice	Orlando, FL	5	72		
18	James Storm	October 18, 2011	Impact!	Orlando, FL	1	8	Aired on tape delay on October 20.	
19	Bobby Roode	October 26, 2011	Impact!	Macon, GA	1	256	Aired on tape delay on November 3.	
20	Austin Aries	July 8, 2012	Destination X	Orlando, FL	1	98	Aries vacated the X Division Championship to invoke Option C for this match.	
21	Jeff Hardy	October 14, 2012	Bound for Glory	Phoenix, AZ	3	147		
22	Bully Ray	March 10, 2013	Lockdown	San Antonio, TX	1	130	This was a steel cage match.	
23	Chris Sabin	July 18, 2013	Impact: Destination X	Louisville, KY	1	28	Sabin vacated the X Division Championship to invoke Option C for this match.	
24	Bully Ray	August 15, 2013	Impact: Hardcore Justice	Norfolk, VA	2	66	This was a steel cage match.	
25	A.J. Styles	October 20, 2013	Bound for Glory	San Diego, CA	2	9	This was a no disqualification match.	
—	Vacated	October 29, 2013	—	—	—	—	TNA President Dixie Carter announced that A.J. Styles was stripped of the title due to a contract dispute. Styles continued to carry the title belt, proclaiming himself champion.	
26	Magnus	December 3, 2013	Impact: Final Resolution	Orlando, FL	1	128	Defeated Jeff Hardy in a Dixieland tournament final to win the vacant title. Aired on tape delay on December 19. On the January 9, 2014, episode of Impact Wrestling (taped December 6, 2013), A.J. Styles returned, claiming to be the legitimate champion and that he was never defeated for the title. Magnus defeated him later that night to become the undisputed champion.	
27	Eric Young	April 10, 2014	Impact!	Orlando, FL	1	70	Had Magnus been counted out or disqualified, he would have lost the title. Had anyone interfered, they would have been fired.	
28	Lashley	June 19, 2014	Impact!	Bethlehem, PA	1	91	Had anyone besides MVP or Kenny King interfered, they would have been fired.	
29	Bobby Roode	September 18, 2014	Impact!	Bethlehem, PA	2	111	Kurt Angle was the special guest referee. Aired on tape delay on October 29.	
30	Lashley	January 7, 2015	Impact!	New York, NY	2	24		
31	Kurt Angle	January 31, 2015	Impact!	London, England	6	145	Aired on tape delay on March 20.	
32	Ethan Carter III	June 25, 2015	Impact!	Orlando, FL	1	101	Aired on tape delay on July 1.	
33	Matt Hardy	October 4, 2015	Bound for Glory	Concord, NC	1	2	This three-way match also featured Drew Galloway with Jeff Hardy as the special guest referee.	
—	Vacated	October 6, 2015	—	—	—	—	The title was vacated due to a kayfabe legal injunction filed by Ethan Carter III.	
34	Ethan Carter III	January 5, 2016	Impact!	Bethlehem, PA	2	3	Defeated Matt Hardy in the TNA World Title Series final to win the vacant title.	
35	Matt Hardy	January 8, 2016	Impact!	Bethlehem, PA	2	67	This was a last man standing match. Had Hardy not won, he would have left TNA. Aired on tape delay on January 19.	
36	Drew Galloway	March 15, 2016	Impact!	Orlando, FL	1	89	This was Galloway's Feast or Fired world title opportunity.	
37	Lashley	June 12, 2016	Slammiversary	Orlando, FL	3	113	This was a knockout or tapout only match. On July 13, Lashley also won the TNA X Division Championship, defeating then-champion Eddie Edwards in a Steel Cage Title vs. Title match. On August 11, Lashley also won the TNA King of the Mountain Championship, defeating then-champion James Storm in a Title vs. Titles match. The following day, Lashley retired the King of the Mountain Championship and vacated the X Division Championship.	
38	Eddie Edwards	October 3, 2016	Impact!	Orlando, FL	1	97	Aired on tape delay on October 6.	
39	Lashley	January 8, 2017	Impact: Genesis	Orlando, FL	4	175	This was a 30-minute Iron Man match. Aired on tape delay on January 26. On March 2, the title was renamed the "Impact Wrestling World Heavyweight Championship", following the promotion's renaming.	
Global Force Wrestling (GFW)
40	Alberto El Patrón	July 2, 2017	Slammiversary XV	Orlando, FL	1	43	This was a unification match for the Impact Wrestling World Heavyweight Championship and the original GFW Global Championship. The title was renamed the "Unified GFW World Heavyweight Championship".	
—	Vacated	August 14, 2017	—	—	—	—	El Patrón was stripped of the title due to a legitimate suspension as a result of a domestic dispute with his then-girlfriend, WWE wrestler Paige.	
41	Eli Drake	August 17, 2017	Impact!	Orlando, FL	1	146	This was a 20-man Gauntlet for the Gold match. The title became the "GFW Global Championship" while retaining the title's history. On August 24, the title was renamed the "Impact Global Championship" (aired on tape delay on September 18).	
Impact Wrestling
42	Austin Aries	January 10, 2018	Impact!	Orlando, FL	2	102	Aired on tape delay on February 1. The title later became the "Impact World Championship".	
43	Pentagón Jr.	April 22, 2018	Redemption	Orlando, FL	1	2	This three-way match also featured Fénix.	
44	Austin Aries	April 24, 2018	Impact! Under Pressure	Orlando, FL	3	173	Aired on tape delay on May 31. Aries unified the title with the Impact Grand Championship.	
45	Johnny Impact	October 14, 2018	Bound for Glory	New York, NY	1	196		
46	Brian Cage	April 28, 2019	Rebellion	Toronto, Ontario, Canada	1	180	Lance Storm was the special guest referee.	
47	Sami Callihan	October 25, 2019	Impact!	Windsor, ON	1	79	This was a steel cage match. Aired on tape delay on October 29.	
48	Tessa Blanchard	January 12, 2020	Hard to Kill	Dallas, TX	1	165	Blanchard became the first woman to hold the championship.	
—	Vacated	June 25, 2020	—	—	—	—	After a period of inactivity during which Blanchard missed multiple tapings due to COVID-19-related travel restrictions, Impact Wrestling terminated her contract and stripped her of the title.	
49	Eddie Edwards	July 18, 2020	Slammiversary	Nashville, TN	2	28	This five-way elimination match also featured Ace Austin, Trey, Rich Swann, and Eric Young.	
50	Eric Young	August 15, 2020	Impact!	Nashville, TN	2	70	Aired on tape delay on September 1.	
51	Rich Swann	October 24, 2020	Bound for Glory	Nashville, TN	1	183	At Sacrifice on March 13, 2021, Swann defeated Moose to unify the TNA World Heavyweight Championship, which was officially sanctioned as a separate title, with the Impact World Championship. The TNA World Heavyweight Championship was deactivated while the Impact World Championship became briefly known as the Impact Unified World Championship before reverting to Impact World Championship.	
52	Kenny Omega	April 25, 2021	Rebellion	Nashville, TN	1	110	This was a Winner Takes All match that was also for Omega's AEW World Championship.	
53	Christian Cage	August 13, 2021	Rampage	Pittsburgh, PA	1	71	This was an All Elite Wrestling event.	
54	Josh Alexander	October 23, 2021	Bound for Glory	Sunrise Manor, NV	1	<1	Alexander vacated the X Division Championship to invoke Option C for this match.	
55	Moose	October 23, 2021	Bound for Glory	Sunrise Manor, NV	1	182	This was Moose's Call Your Shot Gauntlet title opportunity.	
56	Josh Alexander	April 23, 2022	Rebellion	Poughkeepsie, NY	2	335		
—	Vacated	March 24, 2023	Impact!	Windsor, Ontario, Canada	—	—	The title was vacated due to Josh Alexander's torn triceps injury. Aired on tape delay on April 6.	
57	Steve Maclin	April 16, 2023	Rebellion	Toronto, Ontario, Canada	1	54	Defeated Kushida to win the vacant title.	
58	Alex Shelley	June 9, 2023	Against All Odds	Columbus, OH	1	218	The company reverted to Total Nonstop Action Wrestling.	
Total Nonstop Action Wrestling (TNA)
59	Moose	January 13, 2024	Hard To Kill	Paradise, NV	2	189	This was Moose's Feast or Fired world title opportunity.	
60	Nic Nemeth	July 20, 2024	Slammiversary	Montreal, Quebec, Canada	1	183	This six-way elimination match also featured Josh Alexander, Steve Maclin, Joe Hendry, and Frankie Kazarian.	
61	Joe Hendry	January 19, 2025	Genesis	Garland, TX	1	126		
62	Trick Williams	May 25, 2025	NXT Battleground	Tampa, FL	1	140	This was a WWE NXT event.	
63	Mike Santana	October 12, 2025	Bound for Glory	Lowell, MA	1	32		
64	Frankie Kazarian	November 13, 2025	Impact!	Winter Park, FL	1	63	This was Kazarian's Call Your Shot Gauntlet title opportunity.	
65	Mike Santana	January 15, 2026	TNA Impact! premiere on AMC	Garland, TX	2	164		
66	Nic Nemeth	June 28, 2026	Slammiversary	Boston, MA	2	105	This was Nemeth's Call Your Shot title opportunity.	
67	Leon Slater	October 11, 2026	Bound for Glory	Tampa, FL	1	28+	This was Slater's Option C title opportunity.	

== Combined reigns ==
As of November 8, 2026.

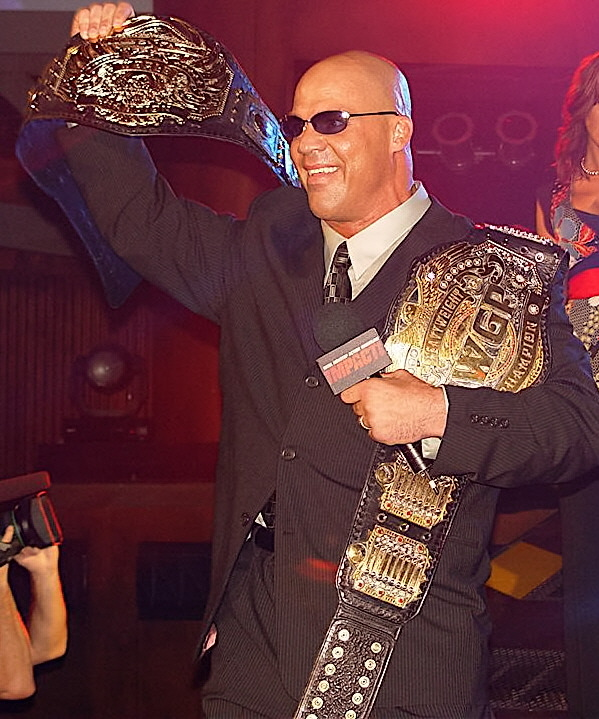
Inaugural and record six-time champion Kurt Angle

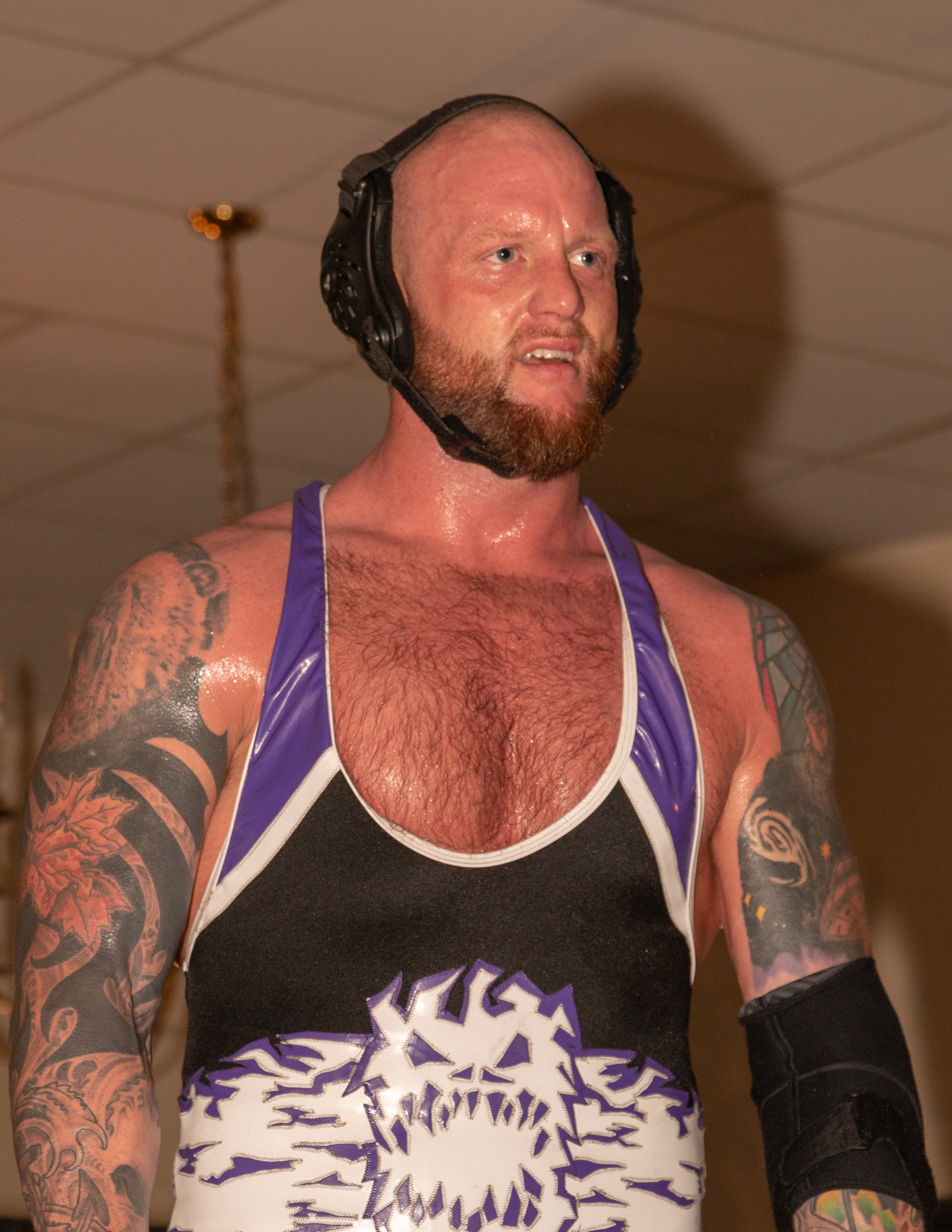
Two-time champion Josh Alexander holds both the shortest reign at 10 minutes and longest reign at 335 days in the championship's history.

†	Indicates the current champion

Rank	Wrestler	No. of reigns	Combined days
1	Kurt Angle	6	608
2	Lashley	4	403
3	Austin Aries	3	373
4	Moose	2	371
5	Bobby Roode	2	367
6	Josh Alexander	2	335
7	Sting	4	326
8	Nic Nemeth	2	288
9	Jeff Hardy	3	249
10	A.J. Styles	2	220
11	Alex Shelley	1	218
12	Bully Ray	2	196
12	Mike Santana	2	196
12	Johnny Impact	1	196
15	Rich Swann	1	183
16	Samoa Joe	1	182
17	Brian Cage	1	180
18	Tessa Blanchard	1	165
19	Eli Drake	1	146
20	Eric Young	2	140
20	Trick Williams	1	140
22	Magnus	1	128
23	Joe Hendry	1	126
24	Eddie Edwards	2	125
25	Rob Van Dam	1	113
26	Kenny Omega	1	110
27	EC3	2	104
28	Drew Galloway	1	89
29	Sami Callihan	1	79
30	Christian Cage	1	71
31	Matt Hardy	2	69
32	Mr. Anderson	2	64
33	Frankie Kazarian	1	63
33	Mick Foley	1	63
35	Steve Maclin	1	54
36	Alberto El Patrón	1	43
37	Leon Slater †	1	28+
38	Chris Sabin	1	28
39	James Storm	1	8
40	Pentagón Jr.	1	2

== See also ==
- List of current champions in TNA Wrestling
