= Slammiversary (2008) =

2008 Total Nonstop Action Wrestling pay-per-view event

- Promotional poster for the event featuring Booker T, Christian Cage, Rhino, Samoa Joe, and Tomko
- Promotion: Total Nonstop Action Wrestling
- Date: June 8, 2008
- City: Southaven, Mississippi
- Venue: DeSoto Civic Center
- Attendance: 2,000
- Tagline: "In a town where legends are made, one strives to reach immortality"

Pay-per-view chronology
| ← Previous; Sacrifice | Next → Victory Road |

Slammiversary chronology
| ← Previous; 2007 | Next → 2009 |

The 2008 Slammiversary was a professional wrestling pay-per-view (PPV) event produced by the Total Nonstop Action Wrestling (TNA) promotion that took place on June 8, 2008 at the DeSoto Civic Center in Southaven, Mississippi. It was the fourth event under the Slammiversary name and the sixth event in the 2008 TNA PPV schedule. Seven professional wrestling matches and one dark match were featured on the event's card, three of which were for championships. The event commemorated TNA's six year anniversary.

The main event was a King of the Mountain match for the TNA World Heavyweight Championship, in which then-champion Samoa Joe defended against Booker T, Christian Cage, Rhino, and Robert Roode. Joe won the match to retain the title. The card also featured a bout pitting A.J. Styles against Kurt Angle, which Styles won. The TNA World Tag Team Championship was defended by The Latin American Xchange (Hernandez and Homicide; LAX) against Team 3D (Brother Devon and Brother Ray) at the event. LAX was the victors in the contest to retain the championship. A Six Woman Tag Team match was won by the team of Gail Kim, ODB, and Roxxi over The Beautiful People (Angelina Love and Velvet Sky) and Moose on the undercard.

Slammiversary is remembered for Joe being the first to retain a championship in a King of the Mountain match. 20,000 was the reported figure of purchasers for the event by The Wrestling Observer Newsletter. Slammiversary had an attendance of 2,000 people. Jon Waldman of the professional wrestling section of the Canadian Online Explorer rated the show a 7 out of 10, which was lower than the 8 out of 10 given to the 2007 edition by Jason Clevett. After the event, an accident occurred which resulted in the death of one man and the injury of another.

== Production ==
=== Background ===
The fourth installment in the Slammiversary name was announced in January 2008 to take place on June 8. In March 2008, it was reported that Slammiversary would be held outside the TNA Impact! Zone in Orlando, Florida. In late-March 2008, Slammiversary was expected to be held in Tennessee. TNA issued a press release in April 2008 advertising Slammiversary on June 8 at the DeSoto Civic Center in Southaven, Mississippi, although TNA promoted the event as being held in the Memphis . It also announced that the annual King of the Mountain match would be held at the event. Tickets for Slammiverary went on sale on April 25. Slammiversary celebrates TNA's six year anniversary, after it formed on June 19, 2002. TNA created a section covering the event on their website. TNA released a poster to promote the event prior featuring the tagline "In a town where legends are made, one strives to reach immortality" and Booker T, Christian Cage, Rhino, Samoa Joe, and Tomko. Release the Flood by Dust for Life was used as the official theme for the show. Promotional material advertising the return of Abyss at the event was featured on TNA's television program TNA Impact!. The scripted wedding of Jay Lethal and SoCal Val was promoted for Slammiversary. This was announced on the May 15 episode of Impact!, when Lethal proposed and Val accepted in the storyline. American singer Ace Young was advertised take part in the segment on the May 22 episode of Impact!. On the May 29 episode of Impact!, Lethal asked Sonjay Dutt to be his best man, to which Dutt agreed. Lethal's groomsmen were announced on the June 5 episode as George Steele, Kamala, Koko B. Ware, and Jake Roberts.

=== Storylines ===
Slammiversary featured seven professional wrestling matches and one pre-show match that involved different wrestlers from pre-existing scripted feuds and storylines. Wrestlers portrayed villains, heroes, or less distinguishable characters in the scripted events that built tension and culminated in a wrestling match or series of matches.

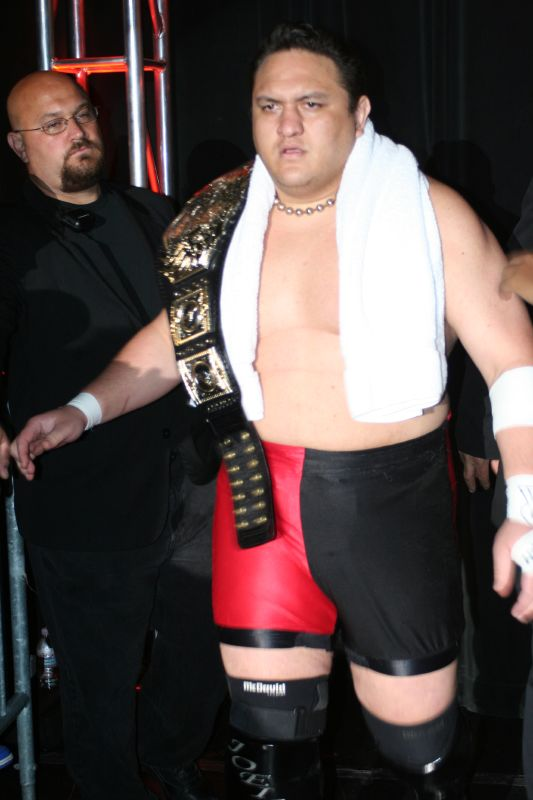
Samoa Joe (pictured) defended the TNA World Heavyweight Championship at Slammiversary.

The main event at Slammiversary was a King of the Mountain match for the TNA World Heavyweight Championship, in which then-champion Samoa Joe defended the title against four other competitors. On the May 15 episode of Impact!, Joe announced the encounter would take place at Slammiversary as well that an agreement had been made between Management Director Jim Cornette and himself on who would compete in the bout. The arrangement entailed that qualifying matches would take place leading to the event between four wrestlers he chose and four wrestlers Cornette chose. Cornette's four wrestlers were James Storm, Matt Morgan, Robert Roode, and Tomko, while Joe's four were A.J. Styles, Booker T, Christian Cage, and Rhino. The qualifying matches were held on the May 22 and May 29 episodes of Impact!. Roode defeated Morgan in the first qualifier, while Booker T defeated Styles in the second, both on the May 22 episode of Impact!. The last two qualification matches were held on the May 29 episode of Impact!, with Rhino defeating Storm and Cage defeating Tomko. Kevin Nash, who played Joe's mentor in the storyline, requested to be made the Special Guest Ringside Enforcer for the bout, which he was granted by Cornette on the May 29 episode of Impact!.

The predominant storyline heading into the event was the rivalry between A.J. Styles and Kurt Angle, both members of The Angle Alliance group. On the February 14 episode of Impact!, TNA held the scripted wedding of Angle's real-life wife Karen Angle and Styles despite Angle and Karen still being married on-screen. Afterwards, Karen and Angle separated in the storyline on the March 13 episode of Impact!. TNA continued to build the situation with Angle attempting to reconcile with Karen on the May 15 episode of Impact!. Karen refused Angle's request on the May 22 episode of Impact!, leading to Angle turning on and assaulting Styles later in the episode due to his jealousy of the affection Karen showed for Styles. On the May 29 episode of Impact!, Cornette announced Angle versus Styles for the event. Angle sustained a severe neck injury in early May with several TNA officials believing Angle would not recover in time to perform at the show. Angle was still in pain a few days prior to Slammiversary but was expected to perform normally despite some officials feeling it was too soon to compete.

The TNA World Tag Team Championship was defended at Slammiversary by then-champions The Latin American Xchange (Hernandez and Homicide; LAX) against Team 3D (Brother Devon and Brother Ray). At TNA's previous PPV event Sacrifice on May 11, LAX defeated Team 3D in the final round of the Deuces Wild Tag Team Tournament for the vacant TNA World Tag Team Championship. On the May 15 episode of Impact!, Team 3D attacked and was scripted to injure LAX's manager Héctor Guerrero, thus starting a rivalry between the two. Cornette announced a rematch from Sacrifice for the championship to take place at the show on the May 29 episode of Impact!.

TNA held a Six Woman Tag Team match pitting The Beautiful People (Angelina Love and Velvet Sky) and Mickie Knuckles against Gail Kim, ODB, and Roxxi at Slammiversary. This was the main storyline in TNA's women's division which started at Sacrifice where TNA held a Ten Woman TNA Knockouts Makeover Battle Royal to become number-one contender to the TNA Women's Knockout Championship. The rules of the contest involved the winner getting a championship match while the runner-up had her head shaven. Love cost Roxxi—then known as Roxxi Laveaux—the match, resulting in her head being shaven. Kim won the bout and went on to have her title opportunity on the May 15 episode of Impact!, which she lost after interference from Love. On the June 5 episode of Impact!, Knuckles made her TNA debut aligning with The Beautiful People in assaulting Kim, ODB, and Roxxi.

== Event ==
TNA held a match to warm–up the crowd known as a dark match prior to the show pitting The Motor City Machine Guns (Alex Shelley and Chris Sabin) against the team of Lance Hoyt and Johnny Devine. The Motor City Machine Guns won the encounter.

=== Miscellaneous ===
Slammiversary featured employees other than the wrestlers involved in the matches. Mike Tenay and Don West were the commentators for the telecast, Jeremy Borash and David Penzer were ring announcers for the event. Andrew Thomas, Earl Hebner, Rudy Charles, and Mark "Slick" Johnson participated as referees for the encounters. Lauren Thompson and Borash were used as interviewers during the event. Besides those who competed at the event, Abyss, Ace Young, Eric Young, George Steele, Héctor Guerrero, Jake Roberts, Jay Lethal, Johnny Devine, Kamala, Karen Angle, Koko B. Ware, Raisha Saeed, Rhaka Khan, Salinas, Scott Steiner, SoCal Val, Sonjay Dutt, and Tomko all appeared on camera, either in backstage or in ringside segments. The wedding of Lethal and Val took place after the second $25,000 Fan Challenge. The segment ended when Dutt proclaimed his love for Val in the storyline and attacked Lethal. Young, Steele, Roberts, Kamala, and Ware came to Lethal's defense before Roberts placed a snake on top of an unconscious Dutt to end the segment.

=== Preliminary matches ===
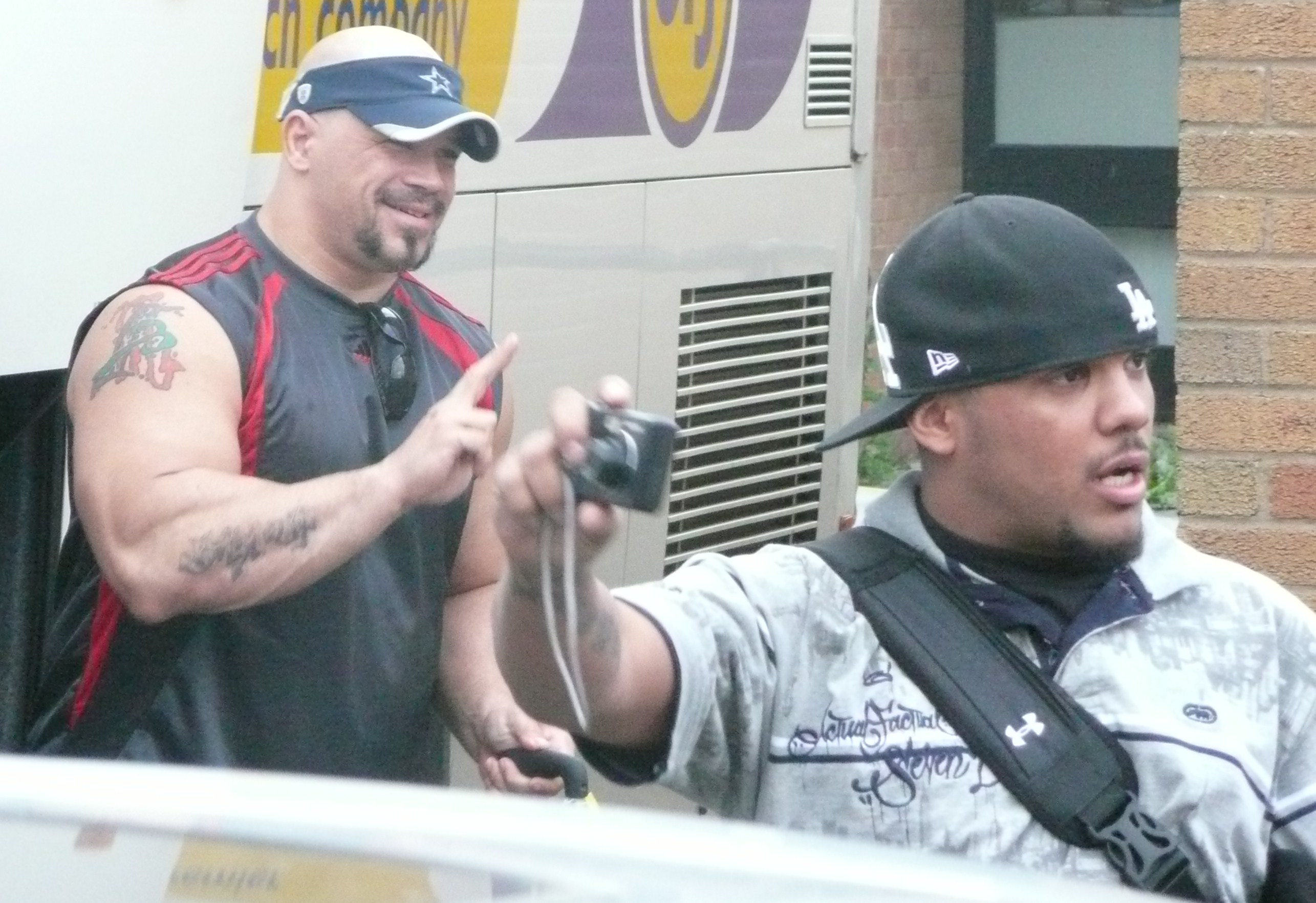
The Latin American Xchange (Hernandez [left] and Homicide [right]) defended the TNA World Tag Team Championship at Slammiversary.

The TNA X Division Championship was defended by then-champion Petey Williams against Kaz in the opening contest of the telecast. Williams was accompanied by Rhaka Khan and Scott Steiner. The duration of the bout was 15 minutes and 19 seconds. Williams wore a protective face mask due to a broken orbital bone. Khan and Steiner interfered in the bout several times. Kaz was legitimately busted open during the match after Williams bashed him in the face with a steel pipe. Williams won the encounter after performing his signature Canadian Destroyer maneuver by slamming Kaz head-first into the mat to retain the TNA X Division Championship. Abyss returned after this match by aiding Kaz who was being attacked by Khan, Steiner, and Williams.

The team of The Beautiful People and Mickie Knuckles—renamed Moose—fought the team of Gail Kim, ODB, and Roxxi in a Six Woman Tag Team match next. It lasted 10 minutes and 14 seconds. ODB won the bout for her team after running and slamming Moose against the mat back-first and following with the pin.

The TNA World Tag Team Championship was defended in the third match of the event by LAX against Team 3D. Héctor Guerrero and Salinas accompanied LAX to the ring. Salinas, Guerrero, and Team 3D's associate Johnny Devine all interfered in the encounter. Near the end when Team 3D were waiting to perform their signature 3D tag team maneuver on Hernandez, Homicide came up behind Devon and pinned him with a schoolboy pin at 15 minutes to retain the championship.

TNA held two $25,000 Fan Challenge segments next with then-TNA Women's Knockout Champion Awesome Kong and her manager Raisha Saeed offering fans in the crowd the chance to face Kong. Kong and Saeed then chose a willing participant and if they defeated Kong they won $25,000. The participants chosen for these segments were predetermined, with each planted in the crowd. The first encounter pitted Serena D against Kong, which Kong won after slamming Serena face-first into the mat with her signature Implant Buster maneuver at 2 minutes and 26 seconds. The second was between Josie Robinson and Kong, lasting 1 minute and 42 seconds. Kong won the bout after slamming Josie back-first into the mat with her signature Awesome Bomb maneuver.

=== Main event matches ===
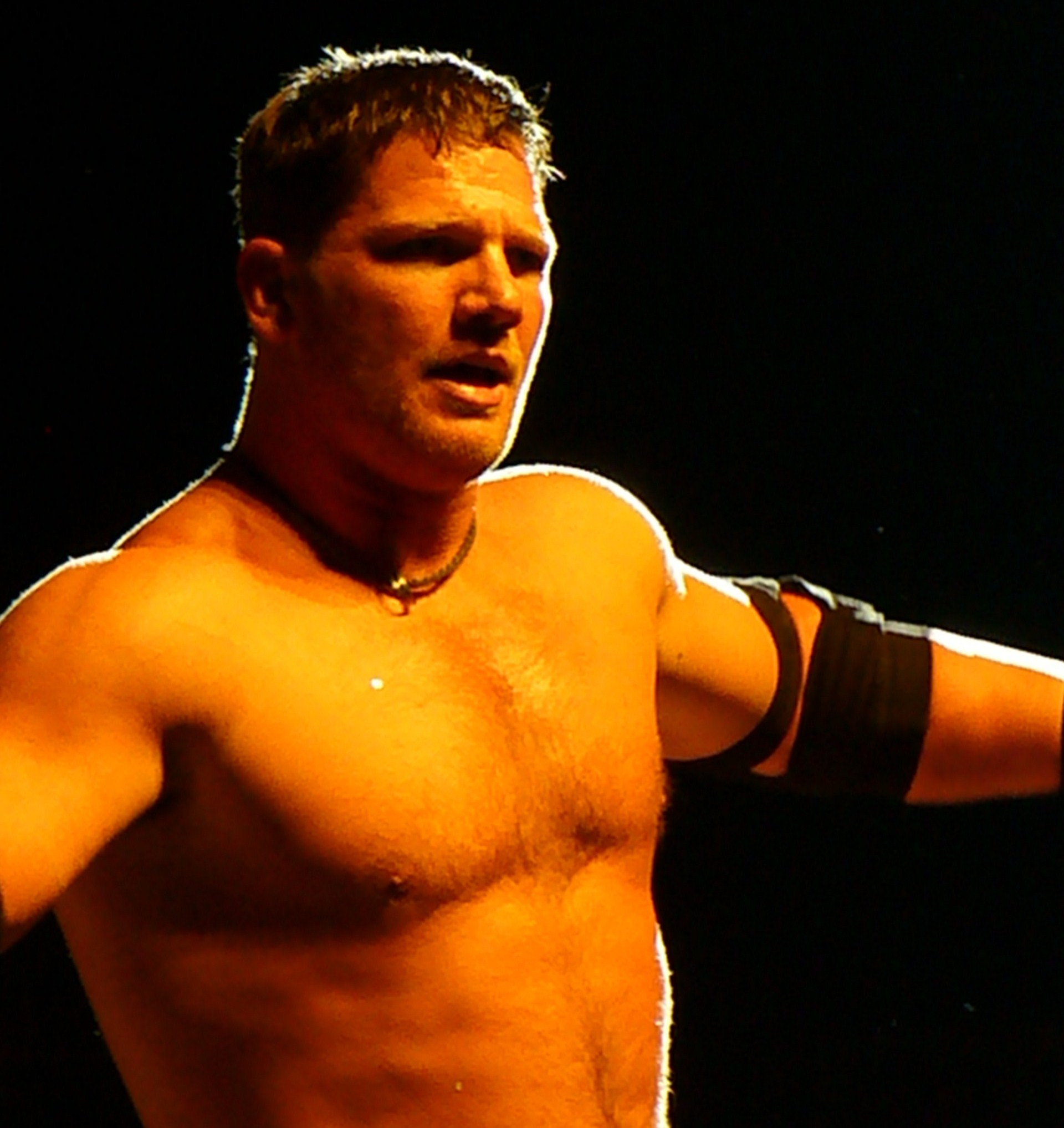
A.J. Styles (pictured) defeated Kurt Angle at Slammiversary.

A.J. Styles fought Kurt Angle in the sixth encounter of the show next. The match lasted 22 minutes and 44 seconds. Angle was accompanied by Tomko to the ring. The referee forced Tomko to head to the backstage area due to the referee believing he would interfere. Styles attempted to perform his signature Styles Clash maneuver on Angle, which Angle countered into his signature Ankle Lock submission hold. Styles escaped the hold, causing Angle to crash into the referee, knocking him out in the storyline. Karen Angle then ran down to the ringside area and attempted to hand Angle a steel chair. Once Angle grabbed the chair she refused to release, allowing Styles to grab Angle and perform the Styles Clash by slamming Angle face-first into the mat. Styles then followed with the pin attempt to win the contest. After the encounter, Angle and Tomko assaulted Styles.

The main event was a King of the Mountain match for the TNA World Heavyweight Championship with Kevin Nash as Special Guest Ringside Enforcer between then-champion Samoa Joe and the challengers Booker T, Christian Cage, Rhino, and Robert Roode. In a King of the Mountain match, the objective is to climb a ladder and hang the championship belt on a hook above the ring. In order to do so, a wrestler must first qualify by either pinning or making another wrestler submit in the match. A wrestler who is pinned or made to submit is this placed in a penalty box for two minutes. The match is fought under no disqualification rules. Booker T was the first to qualify by pinning Rhino after slamming him back-first into the mat with his signature Book End maneuver. Rhino was this placed in the penalty box. Roode was the next to qualify after bashing a ladder Cage held with a chair into him and following with a pin. Immediately afterwards, Rhino pinned Roode with a roll-up pin to qualify. Later, Joe held Booker T in his signature Coquina Clutch submission hold when Cage ascended a padded turnbuckle and jumped off onto Booker T and Joe. He followed by pinning Booker T to qualify and send Booker T to the penalty box. When Booker T was released from the box, he attacked Nash with the title belt and then attempted to hang it. Nash stopped him and then dropped Booker T back-first against the mat with his signature Jackknife Powerbomb maneuver. Joe was the last to qualify by pinning Roode after slamming him back and neck-first into the mat with his signature Muscle Buster maneuver. Joe then hung the title belt at 19 minutes and 49 seconds to win the competition.

== Reception ==
A total of 2,000 people attended Slammiversary, while The Wrestling Observer Newsletter reported that 20,000 people bought the event. Canadian Online Explorer writer Jon Waldman rated the entire event a 7 out of 10, which was lower than the 8 out of 10 given to the 2007 edition by Jason Clevett. The 7 out of 10 was the same rating given to the 2009 edition by Chris and Bryan Sokol. The previous PPV event Sacrifice and TNA's next PPV event Victory Road both received a 7 out of 10 by Chris Sokol and Bob Kapur, respectively. Compared to rival World Wrestling Entertainment's (WWE) One Night Stand PPV event on June 1, both performed equally, as One Night Stand received the same rating from Matt Mackinder.

Waldman felt that "TNA put on a strong PPV" that was in "large part to little gimmickery." Regarding the main event, Waldman gave it a 6 out of 10, while the World Tag Team Championship match received a 4 out of 10. He gave the Six Woman Tag Team match a 4.5 out of 10 and the A.J. Styles versus Kurt Angle bout a 9 out of 10. The X Division Championship contest was given a 7 out of 10.

Wade Keller of the Pro Wrestling Torch Newsletter reviewed the show. He felt the main event had "lots of action and drama," but that having to hang the belt on a hook does not make for a "particularly dramatic end to a match as it seems like someone hanging a plant in the corner" than "beating someone to win a fight." Keller said the World Tag Team Championship contest was a "solid tag match" with some "elaborate sequences" that were "well executed." Keller stated that the X Division Championship match was a "very good opener." Regarding the Styles and Angle bout, Keller commented that it was a "good match, but short of a classic must-see match in part because there were too many chinlocks mid-match from Angle that took the crowd out of it."

James Caldwell, also of the Pro Wrestling Torch Newsletter, posted a review of the show in which he felt the main event was a "slow, plodding match" with an "anticlimactic finish." Caldwell stated that the Styles versus Angle contest was a "fine spotlight singles match," but was a "bit underwhelming when the expectations were reasonably high for two of TNA's best wrestlers in a featured singles match." He went on to say that he felt it was "missing something" and that it "seemed like the match just never moved out of second gear. Caldwell felt the X Division Championship bout was a "very good opening match," which "could have been a featured match to sell a few additional PPV buys, but TNA didn't give the X Division any focus until the final show before the PPV." Caldwell stated the World Tag Team Championship was "just a slow, plodding tag match." Regarding the marriage segment during the show, Caldwell said "it was just a bad, bad, bad segment that died slowly and painfully in front of the live audience." Overall, Caldwell felt that "TNA showcased the X Division in the opening match," but needed more "athleticism on the show to balance the slow, plodding former WWE heavyweight wrestlers in the main event slots."

== Accident ==
A tragic accident following TNA's PPV event at the Desoto County Civic Center in Southaven, Mississippi, resulted in the death of an employee of a TNA independent production contractor.
The accident occurred following the conclusion of the event as technical crews worked to disassemble the TNA set.
Currently, TNA is working in cooperation with local authorities to investigate the details surrounding the accident.
TNA is deeply saddened by this tragedy.
Our thoughts and prayers are with the family in their time of loss.

— TNA Wrestling.com: taken from a report by Ariel Shnerer of Fight Network

After Slammiversary ended, crews began to disassemble the set used for the event. During this time, a man named Kevin "Angus" Sinex was removing a light array when the scaffolding he was positioned on collapsed, causing him to slam against the concrete floor below. He was rushed to the Baptist DeSoto Hospital in Southaven, Mississippi where he was pronounced deceased. Another worker named Paul Martin was also taken to the hospital due to his thumb being cut off in the incident. TNA released a statement regarding the incident the next day through their website. The June 12 episode of Impact! was dedicated to Sinex, with a banner at the beginning of the show stating "In memory Kevin Sinex (1963–2008)". A moment of silence was held prior to the Impact! tapings after Slammiversary in honor of Sinex.

== Aftermath ==
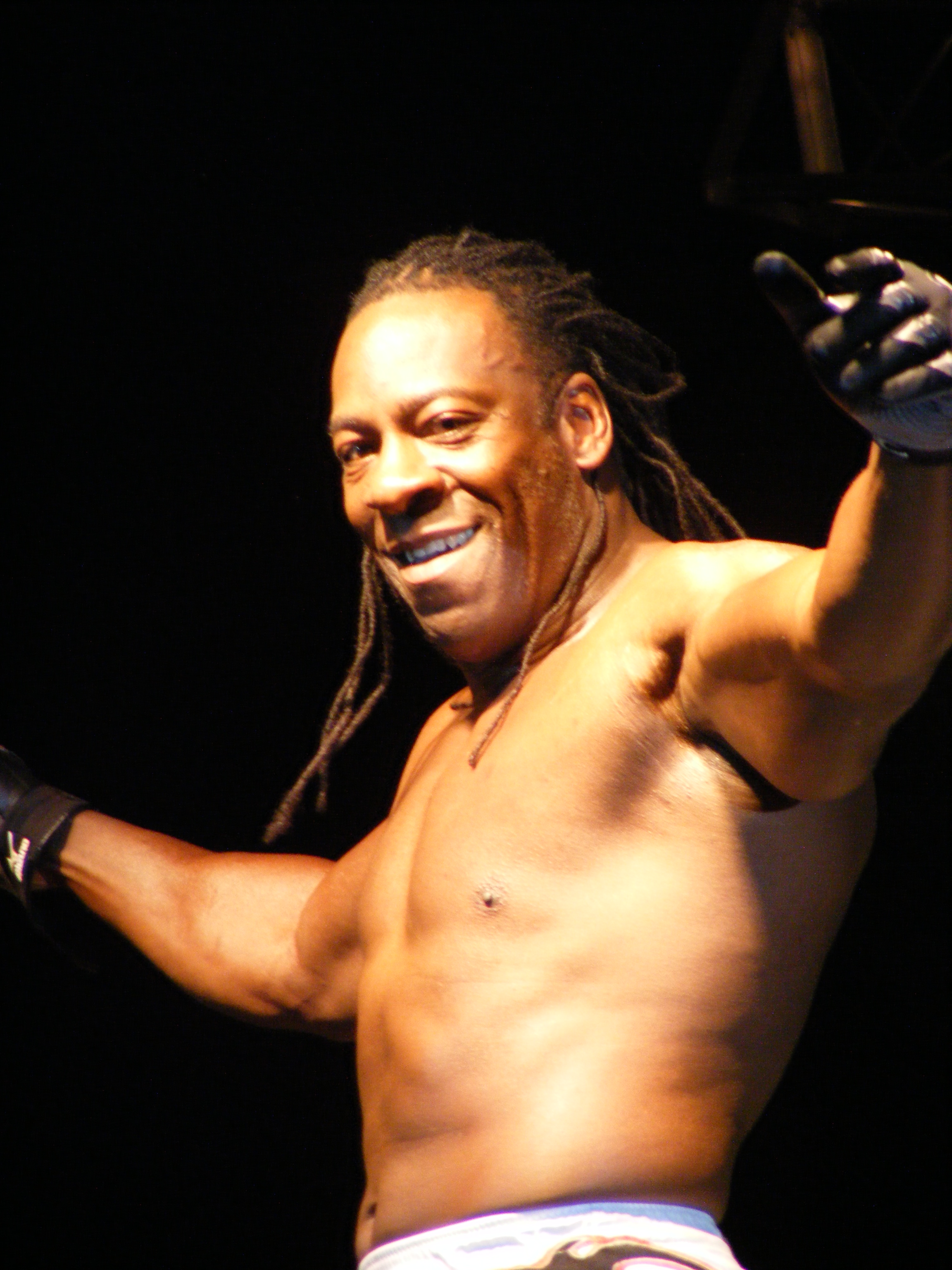
Booker T challenged Samoa Joe for the TNA World Heavyweight Championship at Victory Road.

Several wrestlers were concerned with Kurt Angle's health going into his Slammiversary match with A.J. Styles. Despite the concerns, Angle appeared to be out of it after the contest but was expected to be alright.

Samoa Joe and Booker T started a rivalry over the TNA World Heavyweight Championship following Slammiversary. On the June 12 episode of Impact!, Booker T claimed that Joe did not beat him at the event due to interference from Kevin Nash. This led to Nash stating that Joe could not beat Booker T in a one-on-one match later in the broadcast. After this segment, Joe announced that Booker T and he would face at Victory Road on July 13 for the title. On the July 10 episode of Impact!, Sting proclaimed that he did not know which of the two would win at Victory Road, but that he would be there to watch. At the event, Joe beat Booker T till he was bloody, causing several referees and security personnel to try to stop him to no avail. He was stopped when Sting interfered in the contest by bashing Joe with a baseball bat. Booker T then covered Joe for an unofficial pinfall victory that was counted by Booker T's legitimate wife Sharmell. The match result was ruled a no-contest, with Joe retaining the title.

A.J. Styles was joined by Christian Cage and Rhino in his feud with Kurt Angle, who was joined by Team 3D. Styles and Angle faced in a Lumberjack match on the June 12 episode of Impact!, which Angle won. Team 3D then injured both Cage and Rhino in the narrative, with Rhino being knocked out on the June 19 episode of Impact!, while on the June 26 episode of Impact! Cage was slammed through a glass table by Brother Ray. Rhino returned from injury on the July 3 episode of Impact!, challenging Team 3D and Angle to a Six Man Tag Team match at Victory Road, while teasing at adding Full Metal Mayhem rules to the bout. An online poll was held to determine the stipulation for the match, resulting in Full Metal Mayhem being chosen. The team of Angle and Team 3D were the victors at the event.

After Slammiversary, Kaz went on to captain Team TNA in the 2008 TNA World X Cup Tournament. He competed in a Four Way Ultimate X match at Victory Road as the final round of the tournament. He was unsuccessful in winning the match and gaining the appropriate points to win the tournament, thus causing Team TNA (Kaz, Alex Shelley, Chris Sabin, and Curry Man) to finish in second place, with Team Mexico (Averno, Rey Bucanero, Último Guerrero, and Volador Jr.) being the victors in point rankings.

LAX feuded with James Storm and Robert Roode over the TNA World Tag Team Championship after Slammiversary. Roode and Storm formed a team known as Beer Money Incorporated and challenged LAX for the title on the June 12 episode of Impact!. The match was originally won by Roode and Storm before being restarted due to interference. LAX won the restart to retain the championship. After the bout, Roode and Storm assaulted LAX and Héctor Guerrero. Management Director Jim Cornette scheduled a title defense at Victory Road between LAX and Roode and Storm under "Fan's Revenge" Lumberjack rules on the June 19 episode of Impact!. LAX were successful in defending the title at Victory Road.

In October 2017, with the launch of the Global Wrestling Network, the event became available to stream on demand.

== Results ==
| No. | Results | Stipulations | Times |
|---|---|---|---|
| 1^{D} | The Motor City Machine Guns (Alex Shelley and Chris Sabin) defeated Johnny Devine and Lance Hoyt | Tag team match | — |
| 2 | Petey Williams (c) (with Rhaka Khan and Scott Steiner) defeated Kaz | Singles match for the TNA X Division Championship | 15:19 |
| 3 | Gail Kim, ODB, and Roxxi defeated The Beautiful People (Angelina Love and Velvet Sky) and Moose | Six-woman tag team match | 10:14 |
| 4 | The Latin American Xchange (Hernandez and Homicide) (c) (with Héctor Guerrero and Salinas) defeated Team 3D (Brother Devon and Brother Ray) | Tag team match for the TNA World Tag Team Championship | 15:00 |
| 5 | Awesome Kong (with Raisha Saeed) defeated Serena Deeb | Singles match | 2:26 |
| 6 | Awesome Kong (with Raisha Saeed) defeated Josie Robinson | Singles match | 1:42 |
| 7 | A.J. Styles defeated Kurt Angle (with Tomko) | Singles match | 22:44 |
| 8 | Samoa Joe (c) defeated Booker T, Christian Cage, Rhino and Robert Roode^{1} | King of the Mountain match for the TNA World Heavyweight Championship with Kevin Nash as Special Guest Enforcer | 19:49 |
(c) / – the champion(s) heading into the match; D / – this was a dark match

King of the Mountain match

1.

| No. | Wrestler | Wrestler pinned or submitted | Notes |
|---|---|---|---|
| 1 | Booker T | Rhino | Booker T pinned Rhino after his signature Book End maneuver. |
| 2 | Robert Roode | Christian Cage | Roode pinned Cage after hitting a ladder Cage held with a chair into him. |
| 3 | Rhino | Robert Roode | Rhino pinned Roode with a roll-up pin |
| 4 | Christian Cage | Booker T | Cage pinned Booker T after an aerial splash onto Booker T and Samoa Joe while Joe held Booker T in his signature Coquina Clutch submission hold. |
| 5 | Samoa Joe | Robert Roode | Joe pinned Roode after his signature Muscle Buster maneuver. |
| Winner | Samoa Joe | N/A | Joe scaled a ladder and hung the TNA World Heavyweight Championship belt to win. |
