= TNA Sacrifice (2008) =

2008 Total Nonstop Action Wrestling pay-per-view event

Sacrifice (2008)
- Promotional poster featuring Kurt Angle, Christian Cage, Sting, and Samoa Joe
- Promotion: Total Nonstop Action Wrestling
- Date: May 11, 2008
- City: Orlando, Florida
- Venue: TNA Impact! Zone
- Attendance: 900
- Tagline: "Are You Willing To Give Up What Means The Most?"

Pay-per-view chronology
← Previous; Lockdown	Next → Slammiversary

Sacrifice chronology
← Previous; 2007	Next → 2009

The 2008 Sacrifice was a professional wrestling pay-per-view (PPV) event produced by the Total Nonstop Action Wrestling (TNA) promotion that took place on May 11, 2008 at the TNA Impact! Zone in Orlando, Florida. It was the fourth event in the Sacrifice chronology and fifth event in the 2008 TNA PPV schedule. Ten professional wrestling matches, two for championships, were featured on the card.

The main event was a Three Way match for the TNA World Heavyweight Championship between then-champion Samoa Joe and challengers Kaz and Scott Steiner. The match was initially promoted as Joe's defense of his title against Kurt Angle and Steiner. However, Angle sustained an injury before the match that removed him from the bout; he was replaced with Kaz. Joe won the match, retaining the championship. The Deuces Wild Tag Team Tournament for the vacant TNA World Tag Team Championship was also held at Sacrifice. The Latin American Xchange (Hernandez and Homicide) defeated Team 3D (Brother Devon and Brother Ray) in the Finals to win the tournament and the championship. TNA featured two matches on the undercard: the TNA Knockouts Makeover Battle Royal for a future TNA Women's Knockout Championship match, and the debut of the TNA TerrorDome to determine who would compete in a future TNA X Division Championship match and take Angle's place in the main event. Gail Kim won the TNA Knockouts Makeover Battle Royal and Kaz won the latter.

Sacrifice is noted for the Deuces Wild Tag Team Tournament and the debut of the TerrorDome, later renamed the Steel Asylum at TNA's Bound for Glory IV PPV event on October 12, 2008. The Wrestling Observer Newsletter reported 25,000 people purchased the PPV and 900 people attended. Chris Sokol of the professional wrestling section of the Canadian Online Explorer rated Sacrifice a seven out of ten, the same ranking he gave the 2007 event.

== Production ==
=== Background ===
In January 2008, TNA announced that the fourth installment in the Sacrifice chronology would take place on May 11. Two months later, Sacrifice was scheduled for the TNA Impact! Zone in Orlando, Florida. TNA created a section covering the event on their website and released a promotional poster featuring TNA wrestlers Christian Cage, Kurt Angle, Samoa Joe, and Sting, and the tagline "Are You Willing To Give Up What Means The Most?" On the May 1 episode of TNA's television program TNA Impact!, TNA announced it would introduce a new match type at Sacrifice, the TerrorDome.

=== Storylines ===
Sacrifice featured ten professional wrestling matches that involved wrestlers from pre-existing scripted feuds and storylines portraying villains, heroes, or less distinguishable characters; these scripted events built tension and culminated in a wrestling match or series of matches.

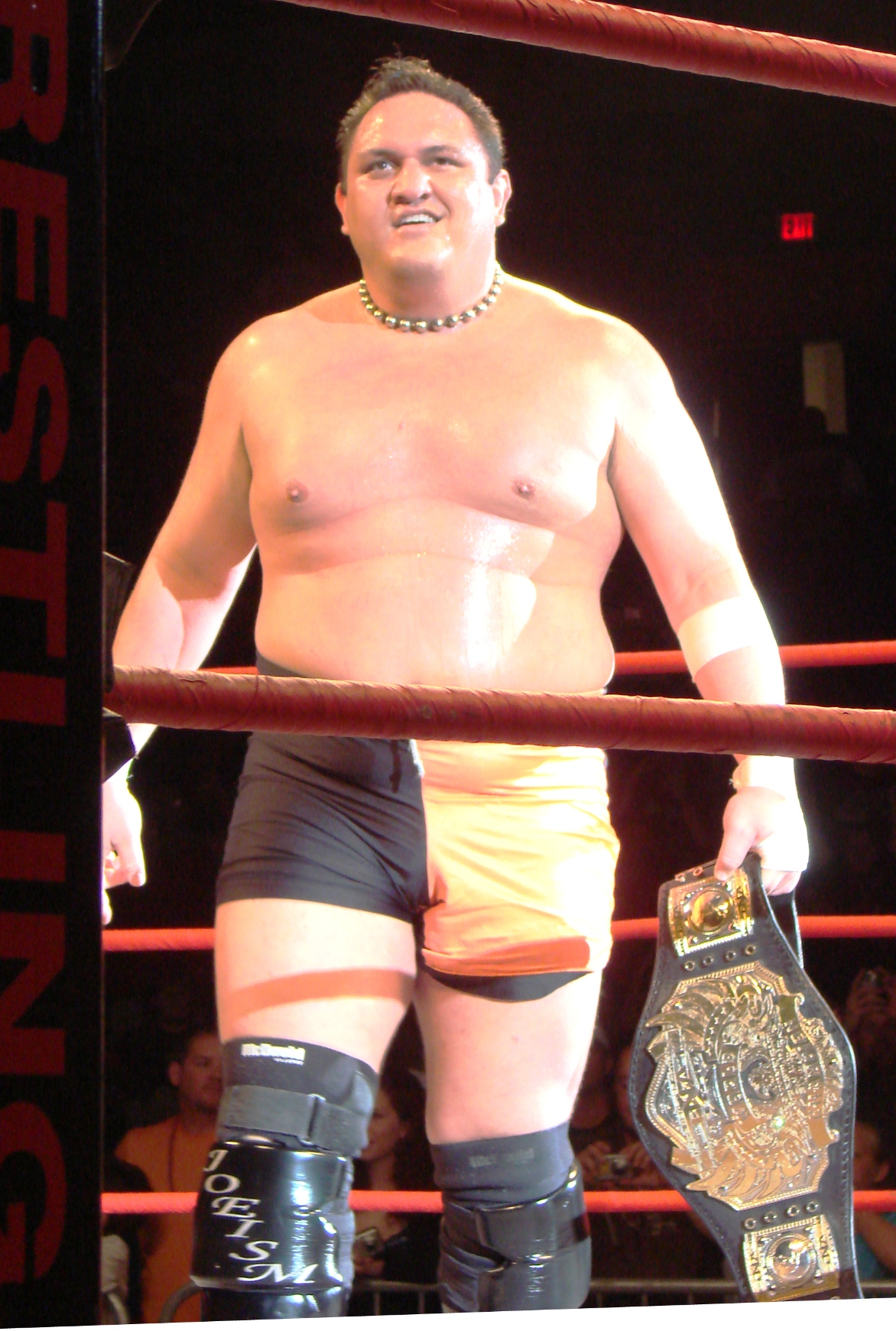
Samoa Joe (pictured) was the TNA World Heavyweight Champion before Sacrifice.

The main event at Sacrifice was a Three Way match for the TNA World Heavyweight Championship between then-champion Samoa Joe and challengers Kurt Angle and Scott Steiner. At TNA's previous PPV event Lockdown on April 13, Joe defeated Angle in a Six Sides of Steel Cage match to win the TNA World Heavyweight Championship. Prior to Lockdown on the April 3 episode of Impact!, Steiner announced that he would use his Feast or Fired TNA World Heavyweight Title shot at Sacrifice. Staying true to his word, on the April 17 episode of Impact!, Steiner challenged Joe to a title defense at Sacrifice. Angle and Joe fought in a rematch for the title on the April 24 episode of Impact!; Joe won after Steiner interfered. In response to Steiner's interference, Management Director Jim Cornette scheduled a Three Way match between Angle, Joe, and Steiner for the title at Sacrifice. On the May 1 episode of Impact!, Steiner would make his now-infamous "Scott Steiner math" promo by saying that Samoa Joe had "8 1/3% chance of winning" while Steiner had "141 2/3% chance of winning".

On the April 17 episode of Impact!, A.J. Styles and Tomko defended the TNA World Tag Team Championship in a Three Way match against the teams of Kaz and Eric Young and The Latin American Xchange (Hernandez and Homicide; LAX). During the match, Young switched to his "Super Eric" superhero character and pinned Styles to win the championship for his team. Styles and Tomko were then scripted to argue that Young and Super Eric were different people. In the storyline, Super Eric and Young refused to admit they were the same person, causing Cornette to strip Kaz and Young of the championship. On the April 24 episode of Impact!, Cornette set up the Deuces Wild Tag Team Tournament to crown new TNA World Tag Team Champions. The tournament consisted of eight established teams competing in four matches to qualify for the tournament. The four winning teams would then compete in a single-elimination tournament against eight wrestlers chosen by Cornette to be assigned as teams at Sacrifice. The first two teams to qualify were Team 3D (Brother Devon and Brother Ray) and the pairing of Christian Cage and Rhino on the April 24 episode of Impact!. LAX and the team of Styles and Super Eric were the last, qualifying on the May 1 episode of Impact!. Cornette also announced the eight wrestlers—known as the Egotistical Eight—who would be involved at Sacrifice on the May 1 episode of Impact!: Awesome Kong, B.G. James, Booker T, Kip James, Matt Morgan, James Storm, Robert Roode, and Sting. Two teams were announced on the May 8 episode of Impact!: Sting teamed with Storm and Kip aligned with Morgan.

The TNA Knockouts Makeover Battle Royal and the debut of the X Division TerrorDome were promoted as featured matches for the Sacrifice undercard. The TNA Knockouts Makeover Battle Royal was announced by Cornette on the April 24 episode of Impact!. The rules of the contest involved two stages: a standard battle royal in which competitors fought to eliminate wrestlers by throwing them over the top rope and a ladder match in which the final two wrestles fought to retrieve a contract that had been hung above the ring. An added stipulation to the bout was that the loser's head would be shaved and the winner would earn a TNA Women's Knockout Championship match. On the May 8 episode of Impact!, Gail Kim won a Ten-Woman Clippers on a Pole match that granted her immunity from having her head shaven if she lost at the event. During the April 24 episode of Impact!, TNA announced plans to introduce a new match type in the near future. The TerrorDome was announced on the May 1 episode of Impact!, and the participants were announced on the May 8 episode. The participants were Alex Shelley, Chris Sabin, Consequences Creed, Curry Man, Jay Lethal, Jimmy Rave, Johnny Devine, Kaz, Shark Boy, and Sonjay Dutt.

== Event ==
At the start of the program, Kurt Angle announced he received a legitimate neck injury wrestling overseas a few days prior to the show. He consequently removed himself from the main event at the order of his doctor.

=== Miscellaneous ===
Sacrifice featured employees other than the wrestlers involved in the matches. Mike Tenay and Don West were the primary commentators for the telecast; Frank Trigg provided guest commentary for the main event. Jeremy Borash (for the main event) and David Penzer served as ring announcers. Andrew Thomas, Earl Hebner, Rudy Charles, and Mark "Slick" Johnson participated as referees. Lauren Thompson and Borash conducted interviews during the show. In addition, Angle, Trigg, Kevin Nash, Rick Steiner, Jim Cornette, Petey Williams, Hector Guerrero, Raisha Saeed, and members of Samoa Joe's family appeared on camera in backstage or ringside segments. Joe's family performed a traditional Samoan fire dance during his ring entrance. Billy Corgan of The Smashing Pumpkins was also in attendance.

=== Preliminary matches ===
The first of four quarterfinal matches in the Deuces Wild Tag Team Tournament opened Sacrifice. It pitted James Storm, accompanied by Jackie Moore and Sting, against Team 3D (Brother Devon and Brother Ray). The match lasted eight minutes and fifty seconds. Near the end, Team 3D set up a table in the middle of the ring. Sting then turned on Storm and lifted him off the turnbuckle and slammed him through the table. Devon covered Storm for the win, thereby advancing himself and Brother Ray in the tournament.

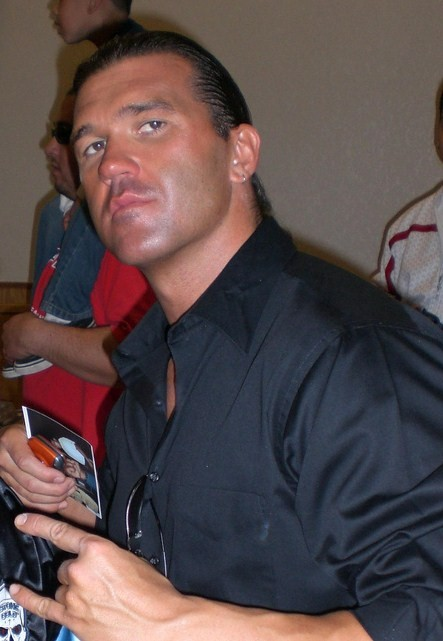
Kazarian (pictured) won the TerrorDome to become the number one contender at the TNA X Division Championship, taking Kurt Angle's place in the main event at Sacrifice.

The second quarterfinal match, Christian Cage and Rhino against Booker T and Robert Roode, lasted seven minutes and five seconds. Rhino won the match for his team by tackling Roode. Afterwards, Booker T attacked Cage and Rhino with a steel chair.

In the third quarterfinal match, Latin American Xchange (Hernandez and Homicide; LAX), accompanied by Hector Guerrero, fought the team of Kip James and Matt Morgan. The match ended after four minutes and twenty seconds when Morgan missed a bicycle kick on Hernandez, mistakenly hitting Kip in the face. Hernandez then performed a dropkick on Morgan and followed with the cover on Kip for the win.

The last quarterfinal match featured A.J. Styles and Super Eric against Awesome Kong and B.G. James. Super Eric picked up Kong and slammed her into B.G., who was lying on the ring mat. Later, Styles attempted to perform a move by jumping off the ropes, but legitimately tripped, falling face-first on the mat. Then B.G. lifted Styles to perform a suplex, which Styles countered into a small package pin attempt, resulting in a victory at five minutes and forty five seconds.

The fifth match was the debut of the TerrorDome and involved Alex Shelley, Chris Sabin, Consequences Creed, Curry Man, Jay Lethal, Jimmy Rave, Johnny Devine, Kaz, Shark Boy, and Sonjay Dutt. Before the match, Management Director Jim Cornette announced that the winner would take Kurt Angle's place in the main event, in addition to being the TNA X Division Championship number one contender. In this match, the ring was surrounded by a giant red steel barred cage with a domed roof. The wrestlers were to compete as they climbed up the side to a hole in the center of the ceiling; the first to escape the cage would win. While Devine was attempting to escape, Kaz intervened and caused Devine to fall from the ceiling into a group of wrestlers huddled in the center of the ring. Kaz then climbed out of the hole to win the contest at ten minutes and forty five seconds.

The semifinals of the Deuces Wild Tag Team Tournament followed, beginning with Team 3D pitted against Cage and Rhino in the sixth encounter. The bout lasted ten minutes. Before the contest, the TNA commentators announced that Booker T's attack on Cage and Rhino had caused them to have concussions in the storyline. During the contest, Team 3D associate Johnny Devine came to the ring and handed Ray a kendo stick without the referee's knowledge. Although Rhino tackled Devon and went for the cover, Devine entered the ring to distract the referee, allowing Ray to hit Rhino with the kendo stick and cover to win the contest for his team.

The last semifinal match between LAX, accompanied by Guerrero and Salinas, and Styles and Super Eric. During the bout, Hernandez lifted Super Eric and held him upside-down vertically for an extended period of time before slamming him back-first into the mat with a delayed vertical suplex. Later, Styles held Homicide in a small package pin attempt until Salinas distracted the referee, allowing Guerrero to enter the ring and readjust Styles and Homicide to make the pin in LAX's favor. Afterwards, the referee counted the pin, giving LAX the win at seven minutes and forty seconds, although Styles' shoulders were clearly not fully against the mat.

=== Main event matches ===
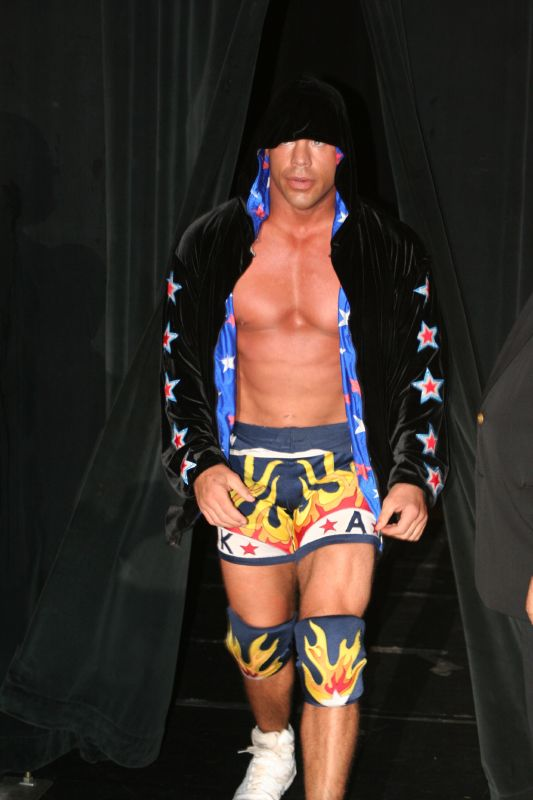
Kurt Angle (pictured) was originally promoted to take part in the main event at Sacrifice, but was injured prior to the event.

The first main event match was the TNA Knockouts Makeover Battle Royal, the winner of which would become the number one contender to the TNA Women's Knockout Championship. It involved Angelina Love, Christy Hemme, Gail Kim, Jackie Moore, ODB, Salinas, Rhaka Khan, Roxxi Laveaux, Traci Brooks, and Velvet Sky. This contest involved two stages; the first was a standard battle royal. After all but two wrestlers were eliminated, stage two, a ladder match, began. The winner of the ladder match would become the number one contender to the TNA Women's Knockout Championship; the loser would have her head shaved. The final four were Kim, Laveaux, Love, and ODB. The next eliminated was ODB, followed by Love; both were eliminated by Laveaux. Only Kim and Laveaux remained for the ladder match portion. Kim had won immunity on the May 8 episode of Impact!, so if Laveaux won the match, then Love's head would be shaven. Love and Sky interfered in the contest several times. During the bout, as Kim and Laveaux stood on the ladder, Kim flipped over Laveaux, grabbed her around the legs, and slammed her into the mat back-first with a powerbomb. Laveaux's head was legitimately cut open during this stage. Later, while Laxeaux climbed the ladder in an attempt to retrieve the contract, Love interfered by pushing the ladder over. Kim followed by climbing the ladder and grabbing the contract to win the encounter at ten minutes. Afterwards, Laveaux was forced to have her head shaven.

Next was the Deuces Wild Tag Team Tournament finals for the vacant TNA World Tag Team Championship between LAX, accompanied by Guerrero and Salinas, and Team 3D. The duration was eleven minutes and thirty seconds. Devine tried to interfere in the contest by setting up a table for Team 3D, but Guerrero stopped him and set up the table for himself outside the ring, placing Devine on top. Guerrero then climbed a padded turnbuckle and jumped onto Devine with a diving foot stomp, forcing him through the table. In the ring, Team 3D performed one of their signature tag team maneuvers, the 3D II, forcing Homicide into the mat and following with a cover, but the referee refused to count because Homicide was not the legal man in the contest. Hernandez then performed his signature Border Toss maneuver on Devon, slamming him into the mat from the top of a turnbuckle. Homicide followed with a splash from the top of a padded turnbuckle on Devon for the pinfall victory, winning the Deuces Wild Tag Team Tournament and the vacant TNA World Tag Team Championship.

The main event was a Three Way match for the TNA World Heavyweight Championship between then-champion Samoa Joe and challengers Kaz and Scott Steiner—Steiner was accompanied by Petey Williams and Rhaka Khan. At the beginning of the bout, Joe placed Kaz and Steiner in various holds and submission maneuvers. Steiner countered this by placing Joe in his signature Steiner Recliner submission maneuver, which Joe escaped by lifting him in the air on his shoulders. Kaz then jumped off of a turnbuckle and dropkicked Steiner. Later, Joe dove through the second rope onto Steiner. However, Steiner countered by hitting Joe in the head with a steel pipe while the referee was distracted by Khan. Near the end of the match, Kaz tried to perform his signature Flux Capacitor maneuver on Steiner from a turnbuckle, but Steiner countered by pushing him off to the ringside area. Joe then kicked Steiner in the head and then performed his signature Muscle Buster maneuver, driving Steiner neck- and back-first into the mat, at fourteen minutes and thirty seconds to win the contest and retain the TNA World Heavyweight Championship.

== Reception ==
The event was attended by 900 people and, according to The Wrestling Observer Newsletter, 25,000 people purchased the show on pay-per-view. Chris Sokol of the Canadian Online Explorer rated Sacrifice a seven out of ten; the same rating he gave to the 2007 Sacrifice event and higher than TNA's previous event, Lockdown, which he gave a six and a half out of ten. TNA's next PPV event, Slammiversary on June 8, received the same rating by Jon Waldman. Sokol felt that Sacrifice was a "decent PPV", and "interesting" overall and rated main event a seven and a half out of ten; he described it as a "solid match, with good wrestling". He rated the TerrorDome the highest, an eight out of ten, and the TNA Knockouts Makeover Battle Royal and The Latin American Xchange versus Kip James and Matt Morgan bout the lowest, a six out of ten. He rated the Finals of the Deuces Wild Tag Team Tournament a seven and a half out of ten, and said that it was "another solid match between these two teams". Sacrifice received a higher rating than rival World Wrestling Entertainment's Judgment Day PPV event, held on May 18, which Bob Kapur gave a six out of ten.

James Caldwell of the Pro Wrestling Torch gave the main event two and three-quarter stars out of five and the Tournament Final received two and a half stars out of five. He stated that the main event had "its moments" but "wasn't memorable". However, he described the Tournament Final as a "great story". Bryan Alvarez of Figure Four Weekly commented that the main event was a "good match" and the Tournament Final was a "pretty good match".

Sacrifice was released on DVD on July 15, 2008 by TNA Home Video.

== Aftermath ==
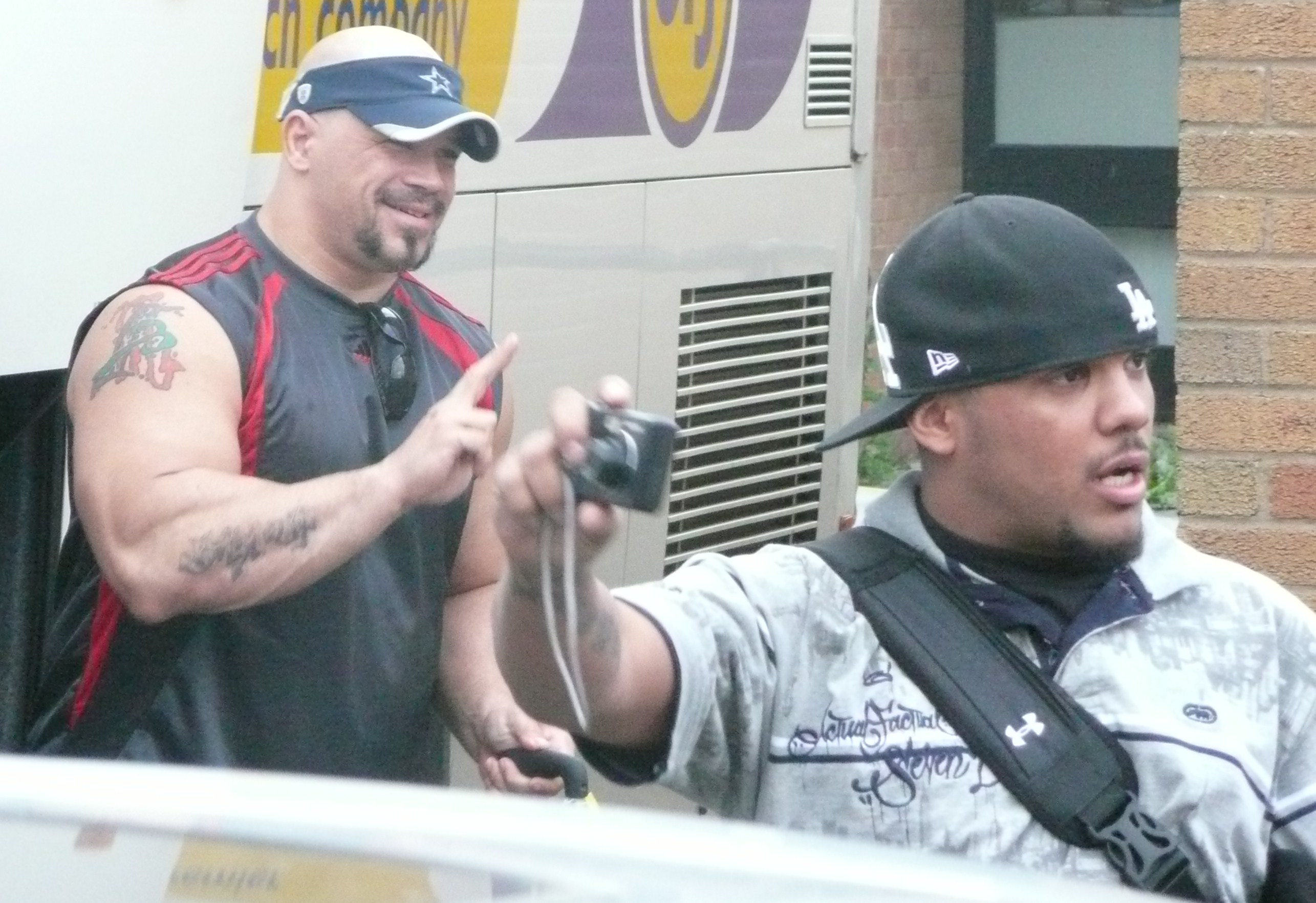
The Latin American Xchange (pictured) (Hernandez [left] and Homicide [right]) defended the TNA World Tag Team Championship against Team 3D (Brother Devon and Brother Ray) at Slammiversary.

The decision to remove Kurt Angle from the Sacrifice main event was not made until the day of the show. Angle was expected to be sidelined for at least one month, putting TNA's original plan, a match between him and A. J. Styles at Slammiversary, in jeopardy. Scott Steiner received an unspecified injury at Sacrifice.

Following Sacrifice, Samoa Joe defended the TNA World Heavyweight Championship against four other competitors in a King of the Mountain match at Slammiversary. The match was announced on the May 15 episode of Impact! by Joe. Booker T, Christian Cage, James Storm, Matt Morgan, Rhino, Robert Roode, Styles, and Tomko competed in qualification matches for the contest on the May 22 and May 29 Impact! episodes; Booker T, Cage, Rhino, and Roode qualified. Kevin Nash was named Special Guest Ringside Enforcer on the May 29 episode of Impact!. Joe retained the championship at Slammiversary.

The Latin American Xchange (Hernandez and Homicide) and Team 3D (Brother Devon and Brother Ray) began a rivalry after Sacrifice over the TNA World Tag Team Championship. On the May 15 episode of Impact!, Team 3D attacked LAX's manager Hector Guerrero. Management Director Jim Cornette announced a rematch for the title at Slammiversary between the two teams on the May 29 episode of Impact!. LAX were the victors in the contest at Slammiversary, retaining the championship.

On the May 22 episode of Impact!, Styles fought Booker T in a King of the Mountain qualifier. After the bout, Booker T, Team 3D, and Tomko assaulted Styles until Angle came to his defense. However, Angle soon turned on Styles, striking him with a steel chair and continuing the assault with Booker T, Team 3D, and Tomko. This set up a match between Styles and Angle at Slammiversary, announced by Cornette on the May 29 episode of Impact!. Styles defeated Angle at Slammiversary.

After Sacrifice, Roxxi Laveaux shortened her name to Roxxi. Gail Kim was given a TNA Women's Knockout Championship match against then-champion Awesome Kong on the May 15 episode of Impact!. Kim lost the bout after interference from Angelina Love. The team of Kim, ODB, and Roxxi defeated The Beautiful People (Angelina Love and Velvet Sky) and Moose in a Six Woman Tag Team match at Slammiversary.

The new number one contender to the TNA X Division Championship, Kaz, was given a title match against then-champion Petey Williams at Slammiversary. Kaz, however, lost the encounter. TNA later renamed the TerrorDome to the "Steel Asylum" when it was used on October 12, 2008 at their Bound for Glory IV PPV event.

In October 2017, with the launch of the Global Wrestling Network, the event became available to stream on demand.

== Results ==
No.	Results	Stipulations	Times
1	Team 3D (Brother Devon and Brother Ray) defeated James Storm and Sting (with Jackie Moore)	Deuces Wild Tag Team Tournament Quarterfinal match	8:50
2	Christian Cage and Rhino defeated Booker T and Robert Roode	Deuces Wild Tag Team Tournament Quarterfinal match	7:05
3	The Latin American Xchange (Hernandez and Homicide) (with Héctor Guerrero) defeated Kip James and Matt Morgan	Deuces Wild Tag Team Tournament Quarterfinal match	4:20
4	A.J. Styles and Super Eric defeated Awesome Kong and B.G. James (with Raisha Saeed)	Deuces Wild Tag Team Tournament Quarterfinal match	5:45
5	Kaz defeated Alex Shelley, Chris Sabin, Consequences Creed, Curry Man, Jay Lethal, Jimmy Rave, Johnny Devine, Shark Boy, and Sonjay Dutt	TerrorDome to determine the number one contender to the TNA X Division Championship and take Kurt Angle's place in the main event	10:45
6	Team 3D (Brother Devon and Brother Ray) defeated Christian Cage and Rhino	Deuces Wild Tag Team Tournament Semifinal match	10:00
7	The Latin American Xchange (Hernandez and Homicide) (with Héctor Guerrero and Salinas) defeated A.J. Styles and Super Eric	Deuces Wild Tag Team Tournament Semifinal match	7:40
8	Gail Kim defeated Angelina Love, Christy Hemme, Jackie Moore, ODB, Salinas, Rhaka Khan, Roxxi Laveaux, Traci Brooks, and Velvet Sky	Ten-woman TNA Knockouts Makeover Battle Royal to determine the #1 contender to the TNA Women's Knockout Championship	10:00
9	The Latin American Xchange (Hernandez and Homicide) (with Héctor Guerrero and Salinas) defeated Team 3D (Brother Devon and Brother Ray)	Deuces Wild Tag Team Tournament Final for the vacant TNA World Tag Team Championship	11:30
10	Samoa Joe (c) defeated Kaz and Scott Steiner (with Petey Williams and Rhaka Khan)	Three Way match for the TNA World Heavyweight Championship (This was Steiner's Feast or Fired World Title match)	14:30
(c) / – the champion(s) heading into the match

TNA Knockouts Makeover Battle Royal

Elimination No.	Eliminated	Eliminator
1	Salinas	Roxxi Laveaux
2	Velvet Sky	Traci Brooks
3	Traci Brooks	Angelina Love
4	Christy Hemme	Rhaka Khan
5	Rhaka Khan	Angelina Love, Jackie Moore and ODB
6	Jackie Moore	Angelina Love
7	ODB	Roxxi Laveaux
8	Angelina Love	Roxxi Laveaux

Deuces Wild Tag Team Tournament bracket

Quarterfinals (PPV – Sacrifice)
James Storm and Sting	8:50
Team 3D (Brother Devon and Brother Ray)	Pinfall
Booker T and Robert Roode	7:05
Christian Cage and Rhino	Pinfall
Kip James and Matt Morgan	4:20
The Latin American Xchange (Hernandez and Homicide)	Pinfall
A.J. Styles and Super Eric	Pinfall
Awesome Kong and B.G. James	5:45

Semifinals (PPV – Sacrifice)
Team 3D (Brother Devon and Brother Ray)	Pinfall
Christian Cage and Rhino	10:00
The Latin American Xchange (Hernandez and Homicide)	Pinfall
A.J. Styles and Super Eric	7:40

Finals (PPV – Sacrifice)
Team 3D (Brother Devon and Brother Ray)	11:30
The Latin American Xchange (Hernandez and Homicide)	Pinfall
