= Travis Tomko =

American professional wrestler (born 1976)

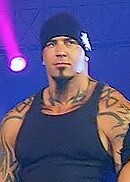
- Tomko in 2007

Personal information
- Born: Travis David Tomko; March 23, 1976 (age 50) Jacksonville, Florida, U.S.

Professional wrestling career
- Ring name(s): Arma; Tattoo; Tomahawk; Tomko; Travis Bain; Travis Bane; Travis Tomko; Tyson Tomko
- Billed height: 6 ft 6 in (198 cm)
- Billed weight: 275 lb (125 kg)
- Billed from: Jacksonville, Florida, U.S.
- Trained by: Jim Cornette; Nightmare Danny Davis; Hack Meyers; Ohio Valley Wrestling
- Debut: June 14, 2002
- Retired: February 22, 2016

Travis David Tomko (born March 23, 1976) is an American retired professional wrestler. He is best known for his appearances with World Wrestling Entertainment (WWE) from 2003 to 2006 under the ring name Tyson Tomko, with New Japan Pro-Wrestling (NJPW) from 2006 to 2008 under his real name, and with Total Nonstop Action Wrestling (TNA) between 2006 and 2010 under the mononymous name Tomko. Championships held by Tomko include the IWGP Tag Team Championship and TNA World Tag Team Championship.

== Professional wrestling career ==
=== World Wrestling Federation / World Wrestling Entertainment (2002–2006) ===
==== Ohio Valley Wrestling (2002–2003) ====
Tomko was signed to a World Wrestling Federation (WWF) developmental contract in April 2002 and assigned to Ohio Valley Wrestling (OVW) to sharpen his skills. While in OVW he was a member of the Disciples of Synn stable and along with stablemate Seven captured the OVW Southern Tag Team Championship, on March 5, 2003, though they lost them less than a month later to the Acolytes Protection Agency (APA).

==== Raw (2003–2006) ====
In July 2003, Tomko began working dark matches for the Raw brand. He made his television debut on the April 19, 2004, Raw, in Calgary, Alberta, Canada, interfering in a Christian versus Chris Jericho match on Christian's behalf and helping him pick up the win. His gimmick was that of "The Problem Solver", and acting as an "enforcer for hire" for Christian and his kayfabe girlfriend Trish Stratus in their feud with Chris Jericho. His singles matches were few and far between; his main goal was ensuring victory for his clients, usually by interfering. When Christian suffered a legit back injury, Tomko continued to stand by Stratus and aid her in gaining an advantage in feuds against Jericho, Victoria, and Steven Richards, among others. The duo occasionally paired together for mixed tag team matches. Upon Christian's return, Tomko immediately paired with him again, filling the same role as before. Following the on-screen split between Stratus and Christian (their dispute was seemingly over Tomko's services), Tomko remained Christian's enforcer. The duo also wrestled as a tag team on occasion, sometimes aligning themselves with Christian's former tag team partner and real-life friend Edge. In June 2005, Tomko, Christian, and Edge joined forces with Eric Bischoff in his crusade against Extreme Championship Wrestling (ECW).

Tomko and Christian were separated in June 2005 when Christian was drafted to SmackDown!. Now on his own, Tomko was pushed as a "monster heel", winning singles matches against many jobbers by (kayfabe) knock out after hitting a big boot to the back of the head. On Raw, he knocked out both World Tag Team Champions, The Hurricane and Rosey. His winning streak ended after he was pinned by John Cena on Raw two weeks in a row. Tomko then went on to form a tag team with Snitsky, however, they were not given much of a push.

On April 3, 2006, Tomko quit WWE on good terms. He then began to work in Japan.

=== New Japan Pro-Wrestling (2006–2008) ===
Tomko debuted in New Japan Pro-Wrestling (NJPW) on July 1, 2006, participating in an eight-man tag match which he won. A few days later, Tomko and Giant Bernard took part in a tournament to determine the interim IWGP Tag Team Champions and reached the finals before losing to Shiro Koshinaka and Togi Makabe. Tomko participated in a tournament for the vacant IWGP Heavyweight Championship, which had been vacated by Brock Lesnar, and lost in the first round to Yuji Nagata. He also participated in G1 Tag League 2006 in block B with Giant Bernard and reached the semi-final before losing to the eventual winners, Masahiro Chono and Shinsuke Nakamura.

At Wrestle Kingdom in Tokyo Dome, Tomko teamed up with D'Lo Brown and Buchanan to take on Tomohiro Ishii, Togi Makabe and Toru Yano, Makabe pinned Buchanan. Tomko lost to Togi Makabe in the first round of the New Japan Cup 2007. On March 11, 2007, Tomko and Giant Bernard defeated Manabu Nakanishi and Takao Omori to win the IWGP Tag Team Championship. Tomko and Bernard joined Masahiro Chono's BLACK faction and would eventually defect to RISE. The pair won G1 Tag League 2007 by defeating Hiroshi Tanahashi and Koji Kanemoto.

At Wrestle Kingdom in Tokyo Dome II, Tomko and Bernard defeated The Steiner Brothers. They lost the titles on February 2, 2008, to Great Bash Heel members Togi Makabe and Toru Yano. Tomko was released early in March 2008 after NJPW decided not to renew his contract. NJPW were struggling financially and could not afford to keep him going. They did however, re-sign his tag team partner Giant Bernard.

=== Total Nonstop Action Wrestling (2006–2008) ===
==== Christian's Coalition (2006–2007) ====
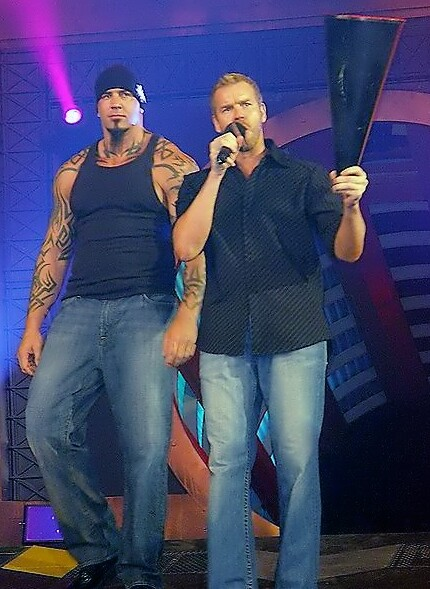
Tomko (left) with Christian Cage in August 2007.

On the November 23, 2006 episode of TNA Impact!, Tomko made his debut in a run-in during a NWA World Heavyweight Championship number one contender's match between Christian Cage and Sting, attacking Sting and siding with Cage, once again acting as Christian's enforcer. On the January 11, 2007 episode of Impact!, Tomko went one on one against NWA World Heavyweight Champion Abyss in a non-title match. To avoid interference, Jim Cornette locked Christian in a cage, and also had Kurt Angle at ringside. During the bout, Angle got into a brawl with Samoa Joe, leaving Cage to escape the cage and interfere in the match, causing a disqualification. On the March 1 edition of Impact! he beat Samoa Joe for a chance for an NWA title shot against Cage.

On the March 8 edition of Impact!, Christian's Coalition lost to Kurt Angle, Rhino and Samoa Joe by disqualification after interference from Abyss who Black Hole slammed Angle. At Destination X, while getting out of the limo onto the black and blue carpet, Christian Cage received a telegram from Tomko stating that Tomko was in Japan and would come back if Cage would give him a title shot. Once Tomko returned from Japan, Cage offered Tomko a spot on Team Cage at Lockdown, but Tomko said he would not choose a team until he got a title shot at the NWA World Heavyweight Championship. It ended up being that Jim Cornette came out and said that the main event on Impact! that night would be one member from Team Cage fighting one member from Team Angle. Whichever team member won, Tomko would go to the team the member was from. It would be Abyss from Team Cage fighting Kurt Angle from Team Angle. In the end, Kurt Angle won by pinfall, but after the match, Tomko signed on to Team Cage instead of Team Angle, making him the final member of Team Cage to fight Team Angle at Lockdown along with Abyss, A.J. Styles, Scott Steiner, and Christian Cage. A match was held to see who would go into the cage first. It would be a match between Samoa Joe and Styles, Jeff Jarrett interfered to become the fifth member of team Angle. Tomko entered that match as the third member, and was successful, until being gored through the cage door. In the end Jeff Jarrett hit Abyss with a guitar full of tacks, and Sting got the pin.

On the following episode of Impact!, Tomko took part in Team Cage's attack on Abyss for being a liability to the team's success after Abyss and Cage failed to win the NWA World Tag Team Championship from Team 3D. One week later, Tomko and Scott Steiner were given a tag team title shot of their own, but failed thanks to botched interference from The Latin American Xchange (LAX). At Sacrifice, Tomko and Steiner met LAX and 3D in a three-way match for the title, but failed again.

After this loss, Rick Steiner debuted in TNA and helped Scott attack Tomko. Tomko remained in what was from then on once again known as Christian's Coalition, once again focused on aiding Cage. Some friction did set in after Cage cost Tomko his May 31, 2007 King of the Mountain qualifying match by distracting him with a chair. Tomko had been placed in the match against fellow Coalition member A.J. Styles because original contestant Jeff Jarrett no-showed (due to his wife's death). Christian was able to convince Tomko to continue on as his ally, which later came in handy as Tomko would go on to do much of the brunt work in the Coalition's feud against the returned Abyss and Sting, though he would be twice pinned by Abyss at PPV's after taking a Black Hole Slam each time. However, the Coalition finally avenged these losses with another bloody beatdown of Abyss which also featured the laying-out of Sting on the July 26 Impact!.

On the PPV that followed, Hard Justice, Tomko, along with Styles and Christian, had taken part in a "Doomsday Chamber of Blood Match", which Abyss picked a week after winning the contract to make it. The match was a barbed-wire six sides of steel cage match in which the objective was to make an opponent bleed and pin that opponent. The Coalition was able to lock Sting out for a while, but after he appeared in the ring, Tomko would be the first man busted open. After a long match, Christian would escape the cage, and Styles was pinned by Abyss.

==== Teaming with Styles (2007) ====
At No Surrender he and Styles won a 10-tag team gauntlet match to win title shots at Bound For Glory. At Bound for Glory on October 14, A.J. Styles and Tomko won the TNA World Tag Team Championship from Team Pacman.

Styles and Tomko defeated LAX on the November 1 edition of Impact! to retain the TNA Tag Team title. Styles and Tomko's success led to some uncertainty within the Coalition, causing Tomko to ask Christian what the chain of command was. Christian said that when he wasn't around, it was Styles - disappointing Tomko. AJ would go on to make some foolish decisions without Tomko's advice or help, starting with a take-down match against Scott Steiner that night. The last major choice Styles made for the Coalition was to join forces with Kurt Angle, forming the Angle Alliance at Genesis by assisting Angle in retaining his TNA World Heavyweight Championship. This plan quickly fell apart, as Christian and Angles could not cooperate, leaving them to fight over Styles and Tomko. The tension between Christian and Kurt would make Styles doubt himself, and he'd often turn to Tomko for advice, which Tomko would not give, telling Styles that he got into this mess himself since he was the one in charge. Tomko's continued distancing of himself from both groups would lead him to separate from the Alliance two weeks before Final Resolution on an episode of Impact!, stating that from now on he works for Tomko. He and A.J. Styles defeated Kevin Nash and Samoa Joe to retain the TNA World Tag Team Championship at Final Resolution. When Styles interfered on behalf of Kurt Angle to help him retain the TNA World Heavyweight Championship against Christian Cage, staying with the Angle Alliance and turning his back on Cage, Tomko was not present with him, leaving both Christian and Angle, staying true to his word.

==== Kurt Angle's henchman (2008) ====
On the January 3 Impact! clarified Tomko's new outlook. While Styles worried about Christian's wrath in Kurt Angle's dressing room, Tomko explained to him that he's on his own. The following week, in an interview, Tomko said Styles got himself into the situation - matter of fact, he created it - and that Tomko knew it was no-win, generally stayed out of it, and now is making his own decisions. That same night, Tomko had his first singles match since becoming independent against Shark Boy, who in storyline was injured, and quickly defeated him. At Against All Odds Tomko cost Christian the world title, then reluctantly aligned with Kurt Angle, following Styles' example so they could stay partners - with no intention of being a team player to the point of becoming a lapdog again. He also became frustrated with Styles constant attraction to Karen Angle, claiming it's hurting the team's focus and even exploding on Styles on an episode of Impact!.

At the 2008 Lockdown PPV, Tomko was captain of his own team in the Lethal Lockdown match, though his team lost to Team Cage after Rhino pinned James Storm. The following episode of Impact, Styles and Tomko lost the TNA Tag Team Titles to Eric Young and Kaz in controversial fashion relating to Young's alter-ego of "Super Eric". This resulted in the titles being vacated and put on the line in a tournament at Sacrifice, which was won by The Latin American Xchange. Following the tournament, Tomko returned from a storyline injury suffered in Japan, and expressed unhappiness towards Styles for participating in the tournament with Super Eric, who was responsible for their title loss in the first place. Styles, in turn, expressed frustration over having to follow others for the past months and wanted to break out on his own. Following that, Tomko wished Styles the best of luck and officially disbanded their tag team.

Tomko continued to act as Kurt Angle's henchman, notably harassing Karen Angle on the debut of her interview segment Karen's Angle on the July 31 episode of Impact!. He was then scheduled to feud with Matt Morgan but the program was cut short when Tomko parted ways with TNA in late July 2008, with reports circulating that he was unhappy with management. His final television appearance was on the August 7 edition of Impact! in an 8-man gauntlet in which he was pinned by Samoa Joe.

Tomko had planned on working regularly for the Inoki Genome Federation in Japan but they cancelled many of their upcoming shows, opening up his schedule to appear one last time with TNA on a non-contractual basis. On the September 11, 2008, edition of Impact! he appeared as the third of three challengers to Samoa Joe as a part of Kevin Nash's challenge.

=== Hustle (2009) ===
Tomko debuted in June 2009 under a mask and the ring name Arma in the Japanese wrestling promotion Hustle, where he formed a villainous tag team called "Armageddon" with fellow former WWE star René Duprée, who served as his partner Geddon. This team would disband shortly thereafter when Geddon turned face and changed his ring name back to René Bonaparte. On July 30, 2009, Bonaparte defeated Arma in Tomko's final Hustle appearance.

=== Return to TNA Wrestling (2009–2010) ===
On the November 19, 2009, edition of Impact! Tomko officially returned to Total Nonstop Action Wrestling in an interview with Lauren, seemingly as a face. He made his in-ring return on the December 17 edition of Impact!, where he, A.J. Styles, Kurt Angle, Abyss and Bobby Lashley defeated Scott Steiner, Doug Williams, Brutus Magnus, Dr. Stevie and Raven. On the January 14 edition of Impact! Tomko turned heel as he was revealed as the man who had attacked Styles multiple times during the past three months, successfully scoring a match for Styles' TNA World Heavyweight Championship later that night as a result. However, Styles defeated him to retain the title. On the February 4 edition of Impact!, Tomko lost to Kurt Angle in an 8 Card Stud Tournament Qualifying match. On the March 4 edition of Impact!, Tomko lost to Jeff Jarrett. On the March 22 edition of Impact!, Tomko was defeated by Rob Terry in a match for the TNA Global Championship. He was seen in a group of heels Eric Bischoff had directed to remove Abyss' mask, and on the May 13 edition of Impact!, Tomko lost to Orlando Jordan via submission which turned out to be his last match in TNA. On August 19, 2010, Tomko's profile was placed in the alumni section on TNA's official website.

=== Independent circuit (2011–2016) ===
On September 4, 2013, Tomko made his debut in Ring Warriors, where he claimed to be the next Ring Warriors Grand Champion. The following week, Tomko defeated Michael Sain. On November 2, 2013, Tomko challenged Bruce Santee for the NWA FUW Bruiserweight Championship, but the match ended in no contest. On February 1, 2014, Tomko wrestled Francisco Ciatso at the USA PRO WRESTLING 20th Anniversary Show in Orlando, Florida. Tomko won by disqualification when Ciatso introduced a chair into the match. On January 21, 2016, Tomko made a tweet on Twitter that he his returning to the ring. Tomko faced Locke and QT Santee at FHW Wrestling in Palm Beach, Florida. on January 22, 2016. On February 13, 2016, Tomko faced Tommy Vandal at Independent Championship Wrestling in Miami, Florida. On February 22, 2016, Tomko faced James "The Kid" Sabin at Florida Hardcore Wrestling and ended up in a disqualification when Sabin hit the referee with the chair.

== Other media ==
Tomko appeared in the video games TNA iMPACT! and TNA iMPACT!: Cross The Line as a playable character, as well as having various WWE action figures produced by Jakks Pacific.

== Personal life ==
Prior to his wrestling debut, Tomko served as a bodyguard to nu metal band Limp Bizkit. He appeared in their 2000 music video for "My Generation."

In October 2011, Tomko was arrested in a Chili's bathroom for robbing a CVS Pharmacy of oxycodone.

Tomko owns a gym in Delray Beach, Florida, called Purlife Fitness Center, where ex-WWE wrestler Giovanni "Romeo" Roselli also works, an organic restaurant called PurLife Cafe, and a property investment company called Coastal Properties Investment Group (Coastal P.I.G.) in Florida Keys, Florida.

== Championships and accomplishments ==
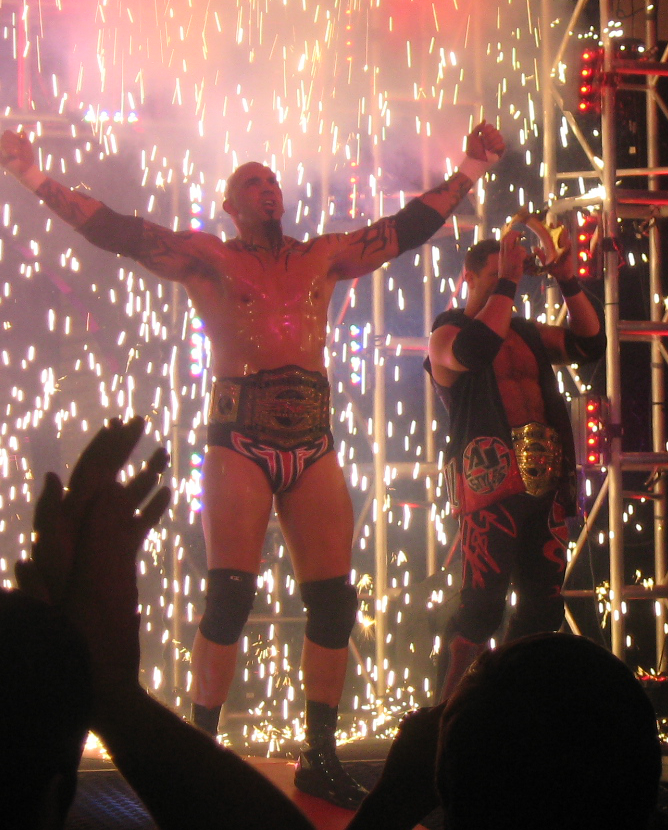
Tomko (left) with A.J. Styles as TNA World Tag Team Champions in March 2008.

- New Japan Pro-Wrestling
  - IWGP Tag Team Championship (1 time) – with Giant Bernard
  - G1 Tag League (2007) – with Giant Bernard
- Nikkan Sports
  - Best Tag Team Award (2007) with Giant Bernard
- Nu-Wrestling Evolution
  - NWE World Heavyweight Championship (1 time)
- Ohio Valley Wrestling
  - OVW Southern Tag Team Championship (1 time) – with Seven
- Pro Wrestling Illustrated
  - Ranked No. 25 of the top 500 wrestlers in the PWI 500 in 2008
- Total Nonstop Action Wrestling
  - TNA World Tag Team Championship (1 time) – with A.J. Styles
  - Gauntlet for the Gold (2007 – TNA World Tag Team Championship) – with A.J. Styles
- Wrestling Observer Newsletter
  - Worst Worked Match of the Year (2004) vs. Stevie Richards at Unforgiven
