= Slammiversary Seven =

2009 Total Nonstop Action Wrestling pay-per-view event

- Promotional poster featuring Jeff Jarrett
- Promotion: Total Nonstop Action Wrestling
- Date: June 21, 2009
- City: Auburn Hills, Michigan
- Venue: The Palace of Auburn Hills
- Attendance: 4,000

Pay-per-view chronology
| ← Previous; Sacrifice | Next → Victory Road |

Slammiversary chronology
| ← Previous; 2008 | Next → VIII |

Slammiversary Seven was a professional wrestling pay-per-view (PPV) event produced by Total Nonstop Action Wrestling (TNA), which took place on June 21, 2009 at The Palace of Auburn Hills in Auburn Hills, Michigan. It was the fifth event under the Slammiversary chronology and used to commemorate the seventh anniversary of the promotion. There were seven matches on the card.

The main event for the show was annually held King of the Mountain match (KOTM) for the TNA World Heavyweight Championship which saw Kurt Angle defeat Mick Foley, Jeff Jarrett, Samoa Joe, and A.J. Styles. For the first time, the undercard for the event also featured another KOTM for the TNA X Division Championship having champion Suicide retain over Consequences Creed, Jay Lethal, Chris Sabin, and Alex Shelley. Other matches featured include: Robert Roode and James Storm (known as Beer Money, Inc.) versus Team 3D for the TNA World Tag Team Championship, Angelina Love versus Tara for the TNA Women's Knockout Championship, Daniels wagering his position in the company against a returning Shane Douglas, Abyss and Taylor Wilde fighting Raven and Daffney in a Monster's Ball Mixed Tag Team match, and Sting versus Matt Morgan.

In October 2017, with the launch of the Global Wrestling Network, the event became available to stream on demand.

== Storylines ==
Slammiversary featured seven professional wrestling matches and one pre-show match that involved different wrestlers from pre-existing scripted feuds and storylines. Wrestlers portrayed villains, heroes, or less distinguishable characters in the scripted events that built tension and culminated in a wrestling match or series of matches.

The main rivalry heading into Slammiversary was the annually held King of the Mountain match (KOTM). The KOTM involves five competitors fighting to gain a pinfall or submission to be allowed to climb a ladder and hang a championship belt above the ring to win. Mick Foley was the first competitor in the match as he was the TNA World Heavyweight Champion heading into the show. On the May 28 edition of Impact!, TNA's primary television program, Foley announced that there would be a series of qualifying matches to determine the other four competitors starting that night. The first match saw Jeff Jarrett defeat Eric Young, then, later on the same edition of Impact, A.J. Styles defeated Daniels. The following week on Impact! Samoa Joe qualified for the match by defeating Kevin Nash. The final competitor was determined to be Kurt Angle the next week after defeating Sting.

Another rivalry involving the tag team division was between TNA World Tag Team Champions Team 3D (Brother Ray and Brother Devon) and Beer Money, Inc., Robert Roode and James Storm. At Sacrifice, Beer Money won the Team 3D Invitational Tag Team tournament by defeating The British Invasion (Brutus Magnus and Doug Williams) gaining a TNA World Tag Team Championship match.

The main rivalry from the X Division was between Suicide and the teams of Lethal Consequences (Jay Lethal and Consequences Creed) and The Motor City Machineguns (Chris Sabin and Alex Shelley). Following an assault from the tag teams, it was announced on the June 4 episode of TNA Impact!, that Suicide would defend the TNA X Division Championship, against all four of his attackers in a King of the Mountain match, marking the first time that the match-up has been used twice on the same card.

The main rivalry from the women's division was between TNA Women's Knockout Champion Angelina Love and Tara (formerly Victoria in WWE). On the May 28 episode of TNA Impact!, Love expressed her perceived dominance in the division, only for Tara to interfere in the proclamation, leading to a series of assaults until it was announced on the June 11 edition of Impact! that the title would be contested between the two.

During Daniels' match with Styles on the May 29 edition of Impact!, Shane Douglas, who was making his return with the company, interfered during the match, assaulting him with a chain, causing him to lose the match. The animosity would progress the following week with Douglas explaining his resentment towards Daniels due to the fact Daniels was given an opportunity to return rather than him. Daniels gave rebuttal of challenging Douglas for a match at Slammiversary with Daniels' contract with the company being held up and given to the winner. On the June 18 edition of Impact!, Douglas accepted.

Another feud being represented at Slammiversary was the conflict between Abyss and Dr. Stevie and his associates. For several months prior to the show, Abyss had been seeking storyline therapy from Stevie, only to have revealed Stevie's abusive treatments towards Abyss. After a match between Taylor Wilde and, an associate of Stevie, Daffney at Sacrifice, Abyss would assault his therapist, leading to Stevie, Daffney, and another associate in Raven, apprehending Abyss and Wilde leading to the announcement of an intergender tag team match pitting Abyss and Wilde against Raven and Daffney with a Monster's Ball stipulation.

== Event ==
Other on-screen personnel
| Role: | Name: |
|---|---|
| Commentator | Mike Tenay |
| Commentator | Don West |
| Interviewer | Jeremy Borash |
| Interviewer | Lauren Thompson |
| Ring announcer | Jeremy Borash |
| Ring announcer | David Penzer |
| Referee | Earl Hebner |
| Referee | Rudy Charles |
| Referee | Mark Johnson |
| Referee | Andrew Thomas |

=== Pre-show match ===
Prior to the show airing live on pay-per-view, a pre-show match that aired on TV and online had the team of Eric Young and Rhino against The British Invasion (Doug Williams and Brutus Magnus) in a tag team match was shown. Young would leave his partner by walking out on him during the match, leading to Williams and Magnus beating down on their lone opponent until Rhino's student, Jesse Neal, put himself in the match to fill the role of Rhino's partner. The team would be defeated by the Invasion after Neal was pinned by Magnus following a bearhug hold / diving European uppercut combination.

=== Preliminary matches ===
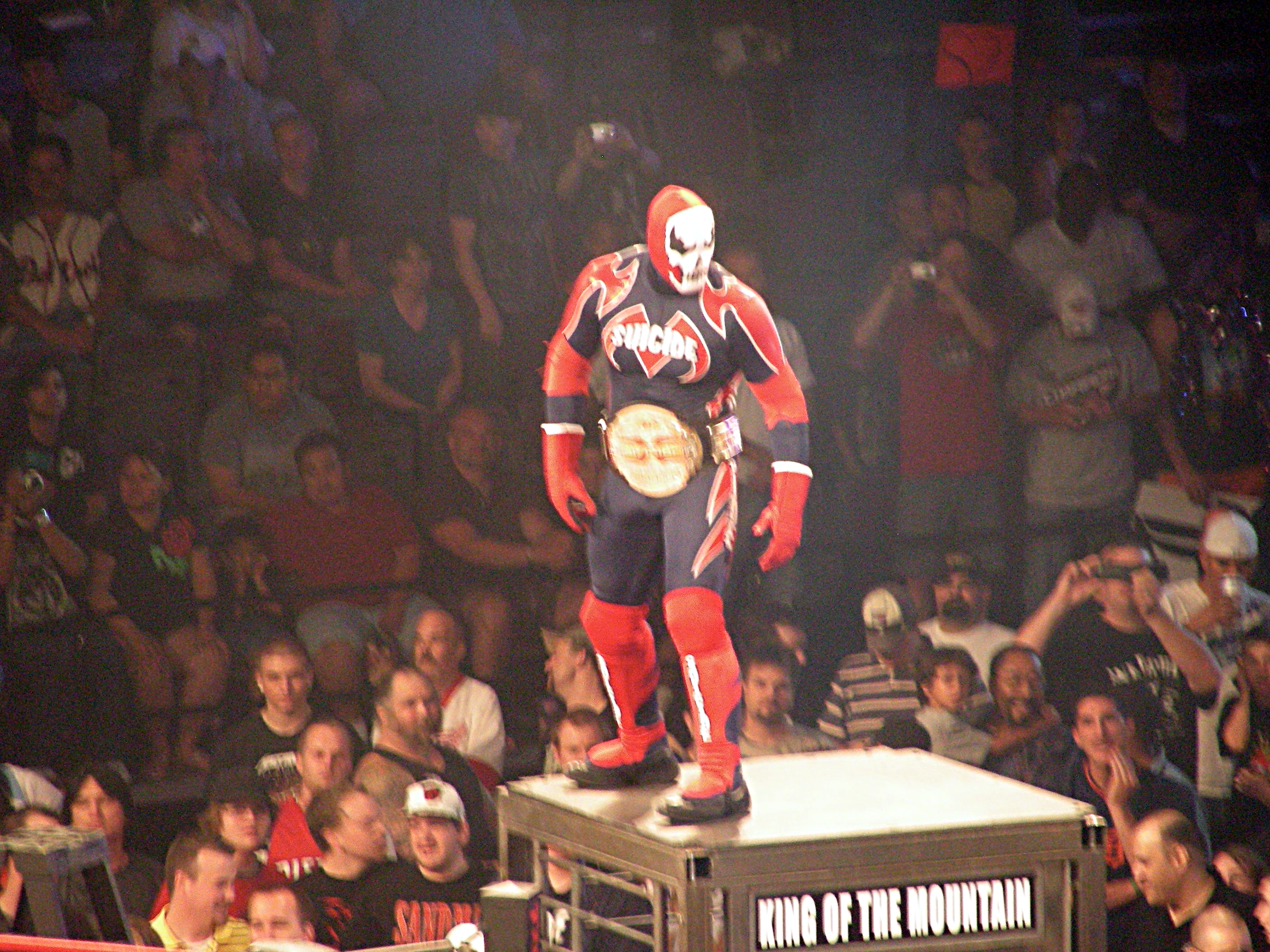
Suicide retained his TNA X Division Championship in the King of the Mountain match.

The show started with the King of the Mountain match for the TNA X Division Championship. The four challengers- Jay Lethal, Consequences Creed, Alex Shelley, and Chris Sabin -initially attacked the champion, Suicide, in order to gain the upper hand. When the ladder was introduced to be used as a weapon against him, Suicide knocked the ladder back, incapacitating his opponents, before pinning Lethal. As per match rules, Suicide was now eligible to win the match suspending the belt above the ring, and Lethal would have to spend time in the penalty box. Once all five men became eligible to win the match, Sabin grabbed the title to suspend it above the ring only to have Suicide head him off. This was followed by a plethora of spots before Suicide was able to obtain the belt himself, only to have Lethal push him off the ladder he was climbing, having him land on the penalty box. Shelley would then obtain the belt before Suicide would run and jump to his opponent climbing the ladder, applying a facelock and dropping Shelley down with a cutter before recovering, grabbing the title, and hanging it over the ring to win the match. Following was Daniels wrestling Douglas for his position in the company. The match started with both men getting quick assaults on each other until Douglas would slide out of the ring to recuperate as Daniels would ascend to the top rope, springboard off of it, and connect with a moonsault to his opponent on the floor of the arena. When the match returned to ring, Daniels would catch his opponent with a back heel trip and clothesline known as the STO before jumping to the top rope and connecting with another moonsault to get the pinfall victory.

Angelina Love would defend the TNA Women's Knockout Championship next against Tara. The match started with Tara beating down the champion; once Tara was about to win, Love's associate, Velvet Sky, would use hairspray to blind Tara before Love took her down with a facebuster, called Lights Out, to retain the title.

Abyss and Taylor Wilde's Monster's Ball match against Raven and Daffney started with Abyss attacking Daffney before throwing her onto Raven and Dr. Stevie, who was in their corner; this was followed by Wilde diving onto her three adversaries. The women would proceed to brawl their way to the entrance ramp, with Wilde performing another dive onto Daffney, as Abyss would retrieve a bag of thumbtacks, spilling its contents onto the mat. This would lead to the women returning to the ring for Wilde to throw her opponent onto them. The finish of the match came when Raven hit his opponent with a steel chair followed by a DDT, only to have Abyss recover and drop Raven onto the tacks with his finishing move, the Black Hole Slam, before pinning him.

Sting made a challenge to Matt Morgan, guaranteeing him a position in his contingency, The Main Event Mafia, if he were to win. The match was fought with both men exchanging strikes before Morgan would physically dominate his opponent. As Morgan went to tackle Sting in the corner, he was countered by Sting getting behind with a facelock, and driving his head to the mat with his Scorpion Death Drop before getting the pinfall victory.

=== Main event matches ===
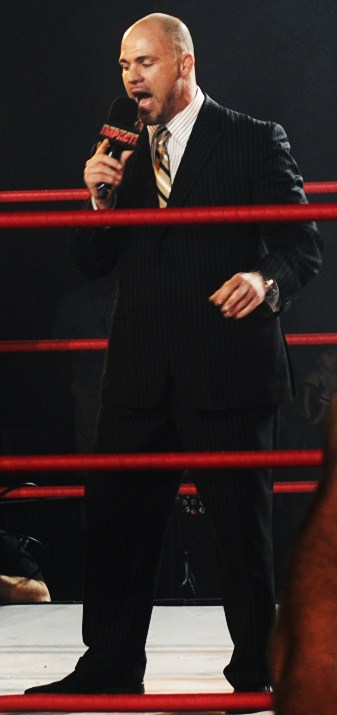
Kurt Angle won his fourth TNA World Heavyweight Championship in the King of the Mountain match.

The following match was the TNA World Tag Team Championship with Team 3D defending against Robert Roode and Beer Money, Inc. The match started with a ploy for Team 3D to use their signature weapon, a wooden table, until The British Invasion distracted the two teams. As the match progressed, the champions executed their finishing maneuver, the 3D, on Roode as The Invasion returned for one last distraction; with Devon distracted, Roode lifted his opponent onto the shoulders of Storm as they dropped them with their own signature move, the DWI, before getting the victory, winning the titles for a third time together.

The main event followed for the TNA World Heavyweight Championship. Before the match started, Samoa Joe would assault rival, Kurt Angle, sending him straight to the match's penalty box. Jeff Jarrett became the first person to qualify for winning the match officially by pinning Mick Foley, who, once out of the penalty box, was placed back in by Joe, who choked him unconscious with his rear naked choke. The match would feature a plethora of high spots including A.J. Styles springboarding off the top rope to execute a dropkick to Foley and Jarrett as they climbed a ladder. Foley and Styles eventually made their way to the top of the penalty box before the former threw off his opponent with a hip toss. The match ended following Styles preventing Angle from climbing the ladder to hang the belt before attempting the feat himself; Joe stopped him with a powerbomb off of the ladder. Joe made his attempt to win the match while Angle himself was climbing opposite of him. Just as he was about to hang the belt, he handed it to Angle, allowing him to win the match and the title.

== Aftermath ==
On the edition of Impact! following Slammiversary, the motives of the end of the TNA World Heavyweight Championship match came to light. Kurt Angle had paid Samoa Joe to fix the match in his favor, thus ensuring Angle's victory. Joe subsequently turned heel and joined The Main Event Mafia, and Angle announced that he had regained leadership of the group from Sting.

=== Reception ===
The show received generally positive reviews from many critics. Wade Keller of the online wrestling newsletter, Pro Wrestling Torch, expressed favorable comments for the show in the X Division King of the Mountain match, saying the competitors, "delivered supreme athleticism and creativity". Dave Meltzer, journalist of the Wrestling Observer Newsletter, gave a live match-by-match report of the show; he praised the show in general, specifically the TNA World Tag Team Championship, as well as feeling the Monster's Ball match was good for a "weapons match".

The common criticism from writers was that the wrestling on the show was merely above average and not really memorable. Wade Keller gave his opinion on the show by saying the main event will not be remembered and believed the swerve in the ending was way to have the match to be remembered.

== Results ==
| No. | Results | Stipulations | Times |
|---|---|---|---|
| 1^{P} | The British Invasion (Brutus Magnus and Doug Williams) (with Rob Terry) defeated Eric Young and Rhino | Tag team match | 08:20 |
| 2 | Suicide (c) defeated Alex Shelley, Chris Sabin, Consequences Creed and Jay Lethal | King of the Mountain match for the TNA X Division Championship | 23:46 |
| 3 | Daniels defeated Shane Douglas | Singles match Had Douglas won, he would have taken Daniels spot as a part it TNA. | 08:12 |
| 4 | Angelina Love (c) (with Madison Rayne and Velvet Sky) defeated Tara | Singles match for the TNA Women's Knockout Championship | 06:51 |
| 5 | Abyss and Taylor Wilde defeated Daffney and Raven (with Dr. Stevie) | Monster's Ball match | 14:07 |
| 6 | Sting defeated Matt Morgan | Singles match Had Morgan won, he would have been able to join the Main Event Mafia. | 08:59 |
| 7 | Beer Money, Inc. (James Storm and Robert Roode) defeated Team 3D (Brother Devon and Brother Ray) (c) | Tag team match for the TNA World Tag Team Championship | 16:55 |
| 8 | Kurt Angle defeated Mick Foley (c), A.J. Styles, Jeff Jarrett and Samoa Joe | King of the Mountain match for the TNA World Heavyweight Championship | 22:04 |
(c) / – the champion(s) heading into the match; P / – the match was broadcast on the pre-show

=== King of the Mountain match ===
| Qualification no. | Wrestler | Wrestler pinned or submitted | Method |
|---|---|---|---|
| 1 | Kurt Angle | Samoa Joe | Joe attacked Angle before the match and was disqualified and placed in the penalty box. |
| 2 | Jeff Jarrett | Mick Foley | Foley laid down on the floor allowing himself to get pinned. |
| 3 | Samoa Joe | Mick Foley | Passed-out after Joe used the Coquina Clutch. |
| 4 | Mick Foley | Kurt Angle | Pinned after a diving elbow drop from the top of the penalty box. |
| 5 | A.J. Styles | Mick Foley | Pinned after falling off a ladder. |
| Winner | Kurt Angle | | Hung the belt to win. |

=== X Division King of the Mountain match ===
| Qualification no. | Wrestler | Wrestler pinned or submitted | Method |
|---|---|---|---|
| 1 | Suicide | Jay Lethal | Pinned after a Suicide Solution. |
| 2 | Jay Lethal | Suicide | Pinned after a Lethal Combination to an unfolded steel chair. |
| 3 | Consequences Creed | Alex Shelley | Pinned after a combination of moves. |
| 4 | Alex Shelley | Chris Sabin | Sabin laid down on the mat allowing himself to get pinned. |
| 5 | Chris Sabin | Jay Lethal | Pinned after a tornado DDT. |
| Winner | Suicide | | Hung the belt to win. |
