= Slammiversary (2007) =

2007 Total Nonstop Action Wrestling pay-per-view event

- Promotional poster featuring Jeff Jarrett
- Promotion: Total Nonstop Action Wrestling
- Date: June 17, 2007
- City: Nashville, Tennessee
- Venue: Nashville Municipal Auditorium
- Attendance: 3,500
- Tagline: "Massacre in Music City!"

Pay-per-view chronology
| ← Previous; Sacrifice | Next → Victory Road |

Slammiversary chronology
| ← Previous; 2006 | Next → 2008 |

The 2007 Slammiversary (sometimes stylized as SlammiVersary) was a professional wrestling pay-per-view (PPV) event produced by Total Nonstop Action Wrestling, which took place on June 17, 2007, at the Nashville Municipal Auditorium in Nashville, Tennessee. It was the third event under the Slammiversary chronology and marked the fifth anniversary of the promotion. Ten professional wrestling matches were featured on the event's card.

Prior to the main event, Jeff Jarrett held a shoot interview where he discussed the recent death of his wife Jill, who died on May 23, 2007, of breast cancer. Jarrett discussed how she influenced the company during the "early days" followed by saying he doesn't know when or where he'll wrestle again. Jarrett then concluded by thanking the fans for their support on his and his wife's behalf. The fans responded by chanting Jill's name as well as "Thank you Jeff".

== Event ==
Other on-screen personnel
| Role: | Name: |
|---|---|
| Commentator | Mike Tenay |
| Commentator | Don West |
| Interviewer | Jeremy Borash |
| Ring announcer | Jeremy Borash |
| Ring announcer | David Penzer |
| Referee | Earl Hebner |
| Referee | Rudy Charles |
| Referee | Mark Johnson |
| Referee | Andrew Thomas |

== Results ==
| No. | Results | Stipulations | Times |
|---|---|---|---|
| 1 | Rhino and Senshi (with Hector Guerrero) defeated The Latin American Xchange (Homicide and Hernandez) (with Konnan) | Tag team match | 8:25 |
| 2 | Jay Lethal defeated Chris Sabin (c) | Singles match for the TNA X Division Championship | 8:52 |
| 3 | Frank Wycheck and Jerry Lynn (with Kyle Vanden Bosch) defeated James Storm and Ron Killings (with Jackie Moore) | Tag team match | 8:52 |
| 4 | Bob Backlund defeated Alex Shelley | Singles match | 3:46 |
| 5 | The Voodoo Kin Mafia (B.G. James and Kip James) defeated Basham and Damaja (with Christy Hemme) | Tag team match | 2:47 |
| 6 | Eric Young defeated Robert Roode (with Ms. Brooks) | Singles match | 9:09 |
| 7 | Team 3D (Brother Ray and Brother Devon) (c) defeated Rick Steiner and Road Warrior Animal | Tag team match for the TNA World Tag Team Championship | 6:39 |
| 8 | Sting defeated Christopher Daniels | Singles match | 6:33 |
| 9 | Abyss defeated Tomko | No Disqualification match | 13:54 |
| 10 | Kurt Angle defeated Samoa Joe, A.J. Styles, Christian Cage and Chris Harris | King of the Mountain match for the vacant TNA World Heavyweight Championship | 19:21 |
(c) / – the champion(s) heading into the match

=== King of the Mountain match statistics ===
| No. | Wrestler | Wrestler pinned or made to submit | Method |
|---|---|---|---|
| 1 | Chris Harris | A.J. Styles | Pinned after a Catatonic |
| 2 | Kurt Angle | Chris Harris | Pinned after an Olympic Slam off the top of the ladder |
| 3 | Christian Cage | Kurt Angle | Pinned after Joe choked Angle out with a Coquina Clutch |
| - | A.J. Styles | N/A | Never qualified |
| - | Samoa Joe | N/A | Never qualified |
| Winner | Kurt Angle | N/A | Angle scaled a ladder and hung the TNA World Heavyweight Championship belt to win. |

== Notes ==
Celebrity guests in attendance for Slammiversary 2007 included LeVar Woods, Zach Piller, Jason Matthews, Vanilla Ice, Rocket Ismail, Johnny Fairplay, Josh Haynes, Francesco Quinn, Michelle Deighton, Dan Clark, Kenny Bartram, Jake Bell, Dr. Justin Davis, Judge Adam Pate, Aaron Severns, Brian Canter, Chris Newman, Craig Newman and "Filthy" Rich Lawson. Nathan Nease was not in attendance.
