= TNA Sacrifice (2007) =

2007 Total Nonstop Action Wrestling pay-per-view event

Sacrifice (2007)
- DVD cover featuring Kurt Angle, Sting and Christian Cage
- Promotion: Total Nonstop Action Wrestling
- Date: May 13, 2007
- City: Orlando, Florida
- Venue: Impact Zone
- Attendance: 900
- Tagline: "Give Nothing... but Take All"

Pay-per-view chronology
← Previous; Lockdown	Next → Slammiversary

Sacrifice chronology
← Previous; 2006	Next → 2008

The 2007 Sacrifice was a professional wrestling pay-per-view event produced by Total Nonstop Action Wrestling (TNA), which took place on May 13, 2007 at the Impact Zone in Orlando, Florida. It was the third event under the Sacrifice chronology. Nine matches were featured on the event's card.

== Production ==
=== Background ===
On this morning, before the airing of the event, the Vice President of the National Wrestling Alliance (NWA) stripped Christian Cage of the NWA World Heavyweight Championship and Team 3D of the NWA World Tag Team Championships due to Cage's refusal to defend the NWA World Heavyweight Championship in various NWA territories. The NWA severed all ties with TNA, although the affected champions still had physical possession of the belts. The affected champions defended their titles at the event.

Other on-screen personnel
Role:	Name:
Commentator	Mike Tenay
Commentator	Don West
Interviewer	Jeremy Borash
Ring announcer	Jeremy Borash
Ring announcer	David Penzer
Referee	Earl Hebner
Referee	Rudy Charles
Referee	Mark Johnson
Referee	Andrew Thomas

=== Storylines ===
Nine matches were featured on the event's card. The event featured wrestlers from pre-existing scripted feuds and storylines. Wrestlers portrayed villains, heroes, or less distinguishable characters in the scripted events that built tension and culminated in a wrestling match or series of matches.

== Results ==
No.	Results	Stipulations	Times
1	Chris Sabin (c) defeated Jay Lethal and Sonjay Dutt	Three-Way match for the TNA X Division Championship	13:01
2	Robert Roode (with Ms. Brooks) defeated Jeff Jarrett	Singles match	11:22
3	Christopher Daniels defeated Rhino	Singles match	9:57
4	Basham and Damaja (with Christy Hemme) defeated Kip James	Handicap match	4:27
5	Chris Harris defeated James Storm	Texas Death match	17:12
6	Jerry Lynn defeated Tiger Mask, Alex Shelley and Senshi	X Division Four Corners match	10:45
7	Team 3D (Brother Ray and Brother Devon) (c) defeated Scott Steiner and Tomko and Latin American Xchange (Homicide and Hernandez)	Three-Way Dance for the NWA World Tag Team Championship	12:40
8	Samoa Joe defeated A.J. Styles	Singles match	12:40
9	Kurt Angle defeated Sting and Christian Cage	Three-Way match for the inaugural TNA World Heavyweight Championship (Note: Due to NWA Wrestling ending their business agreement with TNA Wrestling that exact day later that night Kurt Angle was crowned the inaugural TNA World Heavyweight Championship after winning the matchup.)	10:44
(c) / – the champion(s) heading into the match
