= King of the Mountain match =

Professional wrestling match type

The King of the Mountain match (Queen of the Mountain when female wrestlers are involved) is a professional wrestling match exclusive to Total Nonstop Action Wrestling.

== Match format ==
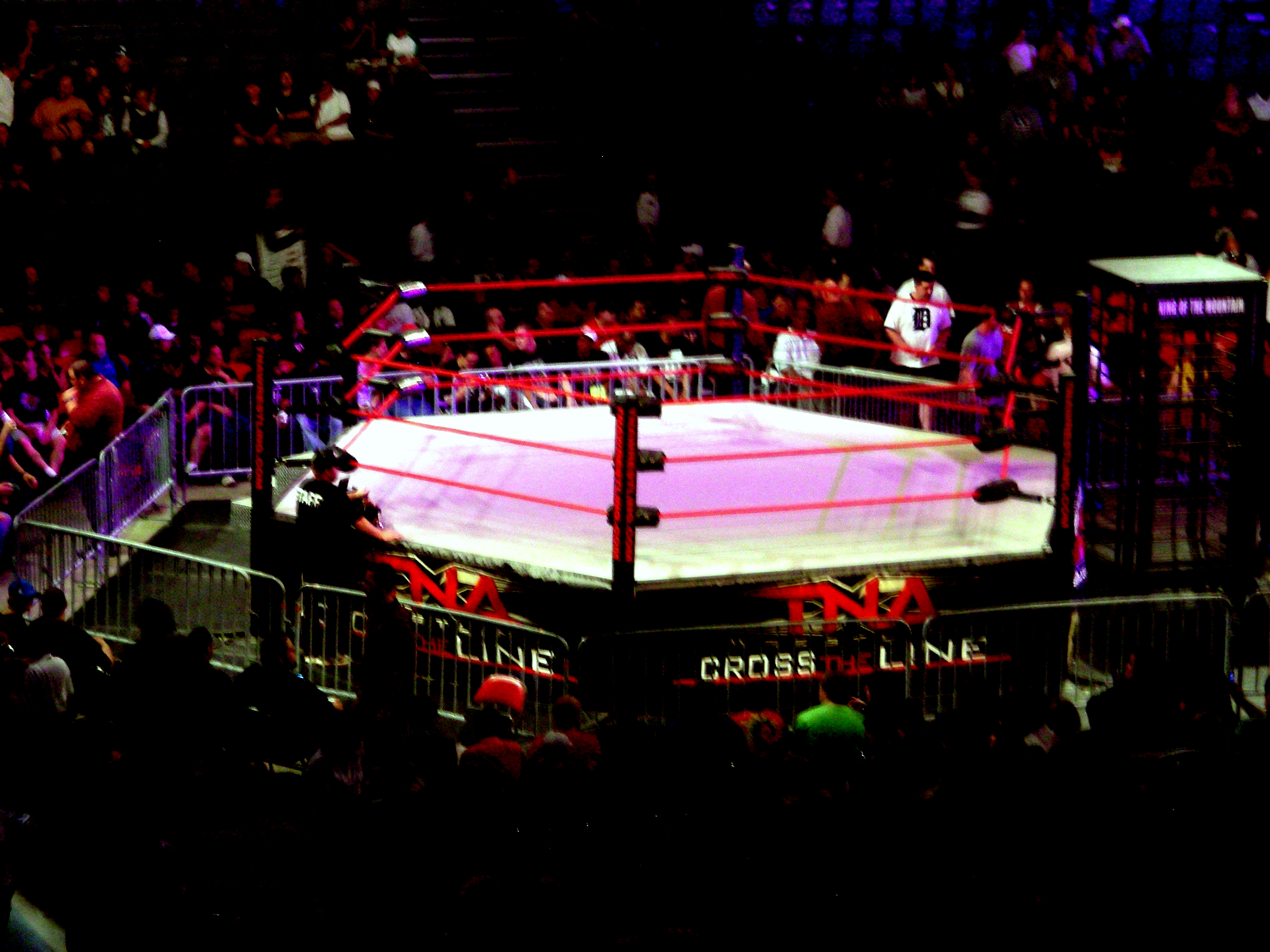
The TNA ring before a King of the Mountain match with the "penalty box" cage on the right.

The five competitors in the match start out as "ineligible" to win. In order to become "eligible", a wrestler must score a pinfall or submission on an opponent. The opponent who submits or is pinned is forced to spend two minutes in the "penalty box" cage. More than one wrestler can be in the cage. This often results in wrestlers fighting inside the cage or forming some sort of alliance.

Once "eligible", the wrestler may win the match by retrieving the match's prize (usually a championship belt) and hanging it on the hook suspended above the ring with the aid of ladders stationed outside the ring. An official maintains possession of the belt and circles the ring, staying out of the action as much as possible. When a wrestler wishes to hang the belt, he must retrieve it from the official. Once the belt is in play, any other wrestler who is eligible may attempt to steal the belt and hang it. Once the belt has been dropped and no wrestler is attempting to hang it, a referee returns the belt to the official.

These modified rules make King/Queen of the Mountain essentially a reverse ladder match, as the competitors attempt to hang the belt instead of retrieving it.

== Stats ==
As of 2016, Jeff Jarrett has won the most King of the Mountain matches with three, winning the NWA World Heavyweight Championship twice in the process. Also, Samoa Joe is the only wrestler to retain a world championship (The TNA World Heavyweight Championship), while Suicide, Eric Young and Bram are the only other wrestlers to retain a championship in the match (Suicide retained the X Division Championship while Eric Young and Bram retained the King of the Mountain Championship).

== Queen of the Mountain ==
At Slammiversary (2022), the first-ever Queen of the Mountain match took place, with Jordynne Grace defeating champion Tasha Steelz, along with Chelsea Green, Deonna Purrazzo and Mia Yim to win the Impact Knockouts Championship. Four-time Knockouts World Champion Mickie James was the match's enforcer.

== Match history ==
=== King of the Mountain ===
#	Winner	Opponents	Prize	Event	Date	Location	Ref
1	Jeff Jarrett	Ron Killings (c), A.J. Styles, Raven, and Chris Harris	NWA World Heavyweight Championship	Weekly PPV #100	June 2, 2004	Nashville, TN	
2	Raven	A.J. Styles (c), Monty Brown, Abyss, and Sean Waltman	NWA World Heavyweight Championship	Slammiversary	June 19, 2005	Orlando, FL	
3	Jeff Jarrett	Christian Cage (c), Abyss, Ron Killings, and Sting	NWA World Heavyweight Championship	Slammiversary	June 18, 2006	Orlando, FL	
4	Kurt Angle	A.J. Styles, Chris Harris, Christian Cage, and Samoa Joe	Inaugural TNA World Heavyweight Championship	Slammiversary	June 17, 2007	Nashville, TN	
5	Kaz	Chris Sabin, Curry Man, Jimmy Rave, and Johnny Devine	Future TNA World Heavyweight Championship match	TNA Impact!	May 27, 2008 (Aired June 5)	Orlando, FL	
6 (Note: Kevin Nash was the special enforcer.)	Samoa Joe (c)	Booker T, Christian Cage, Rhino, and Robert Roode	TNA World Heavyweight Championship	Slammiversary	June 8, 2008	Southaven, MS	
7	Suicide (c) (Note: This iteration of Suicide was played by Frankie Kazarian.)	Alex Shelley, Chris Sabin, Consequences Creed, and Jay Lethal	TNA X Division Championship	Slammiversary	June 21, 2009	Auburn Hills, MI	
8	Kurt Angle	Mick Foley (c), A.J. Styles, Jeff Jarrett, and Samoa Joe	TNA World Heavyweight Championship	Slammiversary	June 21, 2009	Auburn Hills, MI	
9	Jeff Jarrett	Bobby Roode, Eric Young, Drew Galloway, and Matt Hardy	Reactivated TNA King of the Mountain Championship	Slammiversary	June 28, 2015	Orlando, FL	
10	PJ Black	Chris Mordetzky, Eric Young, Lashley, and Robbie E	Vacant TNA King of the Mountain Championship	Impact Wrestling: TNA vs. GFW	July 27, 2015 (Aired August 12)	Orlando, FL	
11	Eric Young (c)	Big Damo, Bram, Jimmy Havoc, and Will Ospreay	TNA King of the Mountain Championship	Impact Wrestling	January 31, 2016 (Aired March 8)	Birmingham, England	
12	Bram (c)	Andrew Everett, Eddie Edwards, Eli Drake, and Jessie Godderz	TNA King of the Mountain Championship	Impact Wrestling	April 21, 2016 (Aired May 3)	Orlando, FL	

=== Queen of the Mountain ===
#	Winner	Opponents	Prize	Event	Date	Location	Ref
1	Jordynne Grace	Tasha Steelz (c), Chelsea Green, Deonna Purrazzo, and Mia Yim	Impact Knockouts World Championship	Slammiversary	June 19, 2022	Nashville, TN	

== See also ==
- Bound for Glory Series
- Feast or Fired
- TNA Turkey Bowl
