= Lauren Thompson =

American TV personality and model

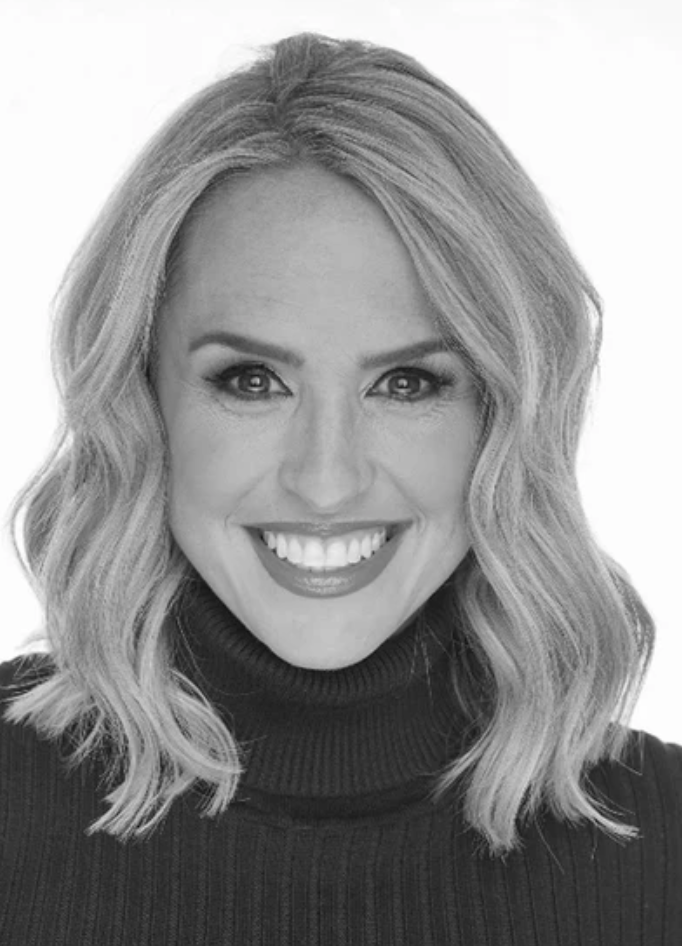
- Lauren Thompson portrait from 2023
- Born: Lauren Brooke Thompson; July 29, 1982 (age 44); Winter Park, Florida, U.S.
- Other name: Lauren
- Spouse: Richard (m. 2010)
- Children: 2

Lauren Thompson (born July 29, 1982) is an American television personality, print model and voiceover actor best known for her time on Golf Channel, as a co-host on "Morning Drive", (from 2010 to 2020) the channel's daily morning show as well as host of "Top Ten", the "College Sports Minute" and is currently a host for GolfNow (formerly "Destination Golf"). She is currently a host with VERSANT. She is also known for having worked for Total Nonstop Action Wrestling (TNA) as a backstage interviewer.

== Career ==
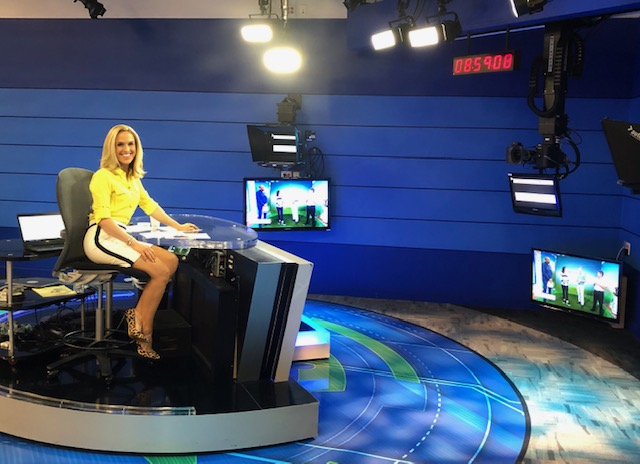
Lauren Brooke Frucci on the set of the Golf Channel's Morning Drive show

Thompson modeled, and served as a speaker, representing companies as spokesmodel. She has also voiced numerous commercials and documentaries. She has appeared in various television commercials, many television shows, and music videos. She has appeared in various television shows, and music videos. She appeared in the music video for Jason Aldean's song "Hicktown", and for Sevendust's song "Praise". Thompson has appeared at conventions across the United States and her management company (Fidelity Sports Group) handles her national shoots and MC bookings. She also has been on Southeastern Conference rivalries on SEC websites as host of the SEC Digital Network.

=== Total Nonstop Action Wrestling (2007–2009) ===
Thompson was hired by Total Nonstop Action Wrestling (TNA) as a backstage interviewer, along with Jeremy Borash, for TNA's flagship television program TNA Impact!, and for their monthly pay-per-view events.

On December 17, 2009, it was reported that Thompson was leaving TNA to focus on her job with the Golf Channel.

=== Golf Channel ===
Thompson joined Golf Channel as the host of Top Ten, an entertainment- style program covering notable moments in the game. She later hosted the network's golf travel program initially titled “Destination Golf”, which was subsequently associated with the GolfNow brand.

Later, Thompson joined the presenting team of Morning Drive, Golf Channel's daily news and discussion program. Her work included presenting news updates, interviewing guests and reporting from golf events. She remained with the program until Golf Channel relocated from Florida to Connecticut at the end of 2020.

In October 2016, Thompson began hosting “The Champion Within”, a sports program featuring interviews with athletes about their careers and personal experiences. The program aired on NBC as part of its The More You Know programming block.

In January 2021, Thompson joined GolfNow and Clubhouse Solutions, NBC Sports Group's digital golf businesses. Her work included hosting the Clubhouse Bulletin, a video newsletter for private golf clubs, and contributing to other digital golf productions.

== Personal life ==
On October 11, 2009, Thompson announced her engagement to long-time friend and fellow UCF student, Richard. They were married on January 23, 2010.

On July 29, 2013, during the last segment of the program Morning Drive, while being wished a happy 31st birthday by the other cast members, Thompson announced she was pregnant with her first child. The couple have two sons together, born in January 2014, and in July 2017.
