= Sting (wrestler) =

American retired professional wrestler (born 1959)

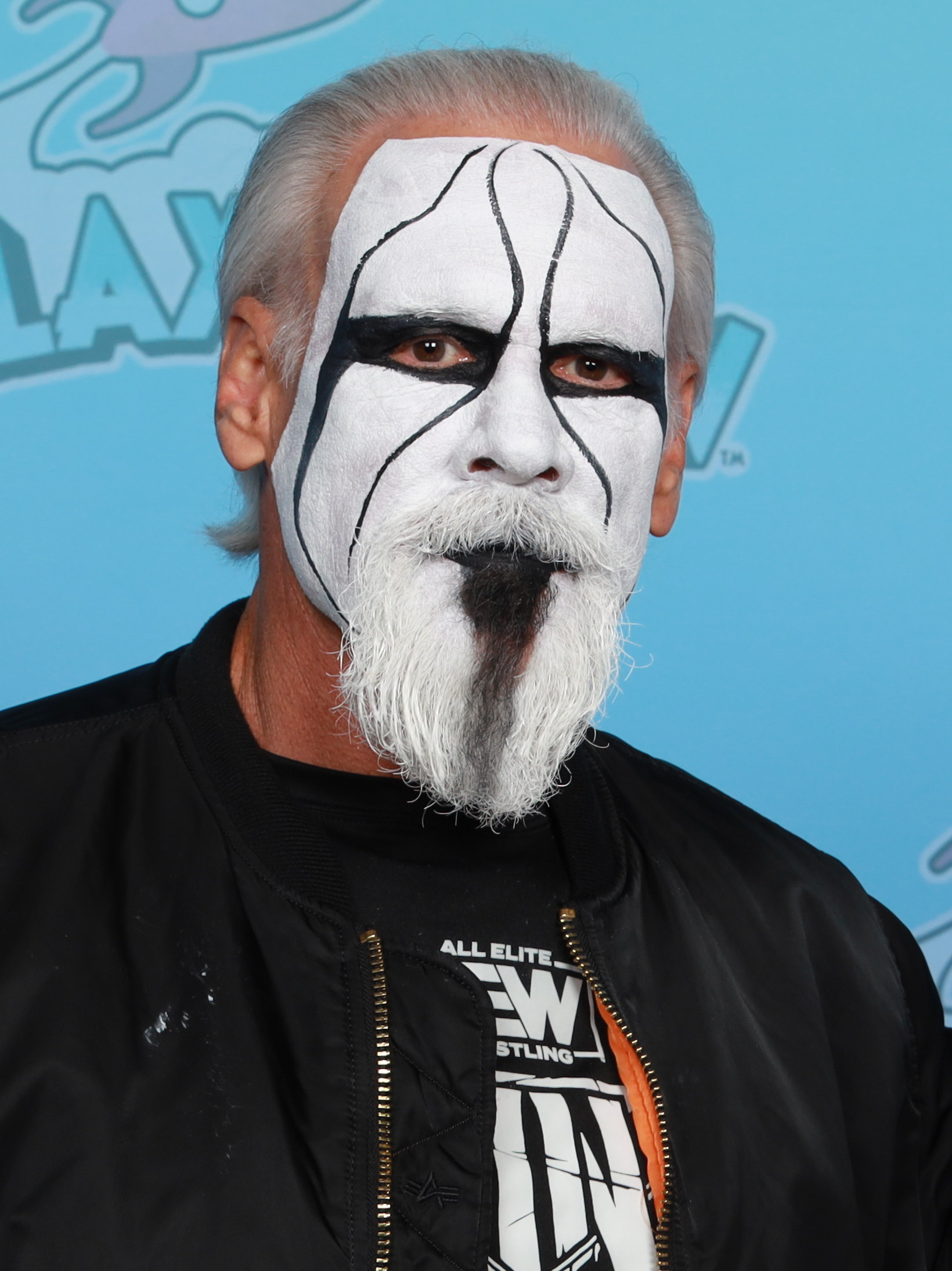
- Sting in 2025

Personal information
- Born: Steve Borden; March 20, 1959 (age 67) Omaha, Nebraska, U.S.
- Spouses: Sue Borden (m. 1986; div. 2010); Sabine Glenn (m. 2015)
- Children: 3, including Steven Borden

Professional wrestling career
- Ring name(s): Blade Runner Flash; Blade Runner Sting; Steve Borden; Sting
- Billed height: 6 ft 2 in (188 cm)
- Billed weight: 250 lb (113 kg)
- Billed from: Charlotte, North Carolina "Every Man's Nightmare"; Venice Beach, California
- Trained by: Red Bastien; Rick Bassman
- Debut: November 25, 1985
- Retired: March 3, 2024

Steve Borden (born March 20, 1959), better known by the ring name Sting, is an American retired professional wrestler. He is signed to All Elite Wrestling (AEW), with which he continues to make sporadic appearances since his retirement. Borden is best known for his lengthy runs in two major American professional wrestling promotions: World Championship Wrestling (WCW) from 1988 to 2001 and Total Nonstop Action Wrestling (TNA) from 2003 to 2014. Borden wore face-paint throughout his career, and in 1996, changed from the multi-colored paint of his "Surfer" persona to the monochromatic paint of the "Crow" gimmick.

Borden started his career in 1985 as Flash in the independent promotion All-California Championship Wrestling, in which he was in a tag team with Jim "Justice" Hellwig as members of the Power Team USA stable, before he and Hellwig joined the CWA as the Freedom Fighters. As Sting, he joined WCW in 1987 where he stayed until 2001. He became one of the mostfamous WCW wrestler, dubbed "The Franchise of WCW", where he won six times the WCW World Heavyweight Championship among other titles. Upon the WWF's acquisition of WCW in March 2001, Sting began to work with TNA in 2003. Over the following 11 years, he won the NWA World Heavyweight Championship on one further occasion and the TNA World Heavyweight Championship four times. Previously described by WWE as the greatest wrestler never to have performed for that promotion, Sting finally joined the company in 2014, where he retired after a botched move against Seth Rollins the next year. In late 2020, Borden signed with AEW, making his first appearance at Dynamite: Winter Is Coming, subsequently coming out of retirement, where he took the on-screen role of Darby Allin's mentor. Sting then had his official retirement match at Revolution on March 3, 2024, retiring both as an undefeated tag team with Allin and as AEW World Tag Team champion.

Borden headlined numerous pay-per-view events, including Starrcade three times (in 1989, 1990, and 1997) and Bound for Glory four times (in 2006, 2007, 2008, and 2009), the flagship events of WCW and TNA, respectively. Pro Wrestling Illustrated named him "Most Popular Wrestler of the Year" on four occasions, a record he shares with John Cena. He is part of the Wrestling Observer Newsletter, TNA and WWE Hall of Fame.

== Early life ==
Borden was born in Omaha, Nebraska, and raised in Southern California. He played football and basketball in high school and later embarked on a career in bodybuilding, once co-owning a Gold's Gym health club. Borden had no interest in professional wrestling and no television access to it within his home community, but decided to pursue a career in the industry after being taken to an "incredible" World Wrestling Federation (WWF) event in Los Angeles where he saw Hulk Hogan, The Iron Sheik, The British Bulldogs, André the Giant and others perform.

== Professional wrestling career ==
=== Continental Wrestling Association (1985–1986) ===
Borden, originally wrestling under the ring name Flash, teamed with Jim "Justice" Hellwig (who would later gain fame as The Ultimate Warrior in the WWF) as two members of Power Team USA in independent All-California Championship Wrestling. Power Team USA was a four-man unit also featuring Garland "Glory" Donahoe and Mark "Commando" Miller, plus manager Rick Bassman. Hellwig and Borden later moved to the Continental Wrestling Association (CWA), a wrestling company based in Memphis, Tennessee, and became known as the Freedom Fighters. Fans were slow to respond to the lumbering hulks, so the team turned heel under "coach" Buddy Wayne and soon afterwards manager Dutch Mantel. The Freedom Fighters left the CWA after an uneventful run, the highlight of which was an angle in which they broke the leg of veteran wrestler Phil Hickerson.

=== Universal Wrestling Federation (1986–1987) ===
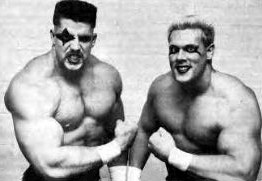
The Blade Runners in 1986: Rock (left, the future Ultimate Warrior) and Sting, both already wearing face paint.

The duo surfaced in the Universal Wrestling Federation (UWF), an organization run by Bill Watts and based in Alexandria, Louisiana, where they were known as the Blade Runners. Borden changed his ring name from Flash to Sting, while Hellwig became known as Rock. They soon joined Hotstuff & Hyatt International, a heel stable headed by "Hot Stuff" Eddie Gilbert and Missy Hyatt. Together with "Russian" wrestler Kostia Korchenko, the Blade Runners became henchmen in Gilbert's on-screen feud with Watts. Hellwig left the promotion in mid-1986, leaving Sting without a partner. Sting won the UWF World Tag Team Championship twice with Gilbert in 1986 and a third time with Rick Steiner in 1987.

Sting and Steiner lost their tag titles to the Lightning Express after Gilbert accidentally hit Sting with his boot during a title defence, leading to a falling out between the two (with Steiner siding with Gilbert). Shortly afterwards, following a match against Terry Taylor in mid-1987, Gilbert interfered on Taylor's behalf, costing Sting the match. Taylor and Gilbert then ganged up on Sting until Taylor's former tag partner Gentleman Chris Adams came to Sting's aid. Adams cleared the ring and then asked Sting if he was with him or against him in his feud with Taylor and Gilbert. Sting turned face by declaring his allegiance to Adams.

Behind the scenes, Gilbert endorsed Borden by telling a dirt sheet that Sting would be a megastar in the future. Later that year, Sting was tabbed to win the UWF Television Championship, then held by Gilbert, until Jim Crockett of the National Wrestling Alliance (NWA) bought the company from Watts. Crockett's booker, Dusty Rhodes, decided to put the Television title on Taylor to set up a feud between Taylor and NWA Television Champion Nikita Koloff to unify the two titles. Rhodes used then-unknown Shane Douglas as the transitional champion from Gilbert to Taylor because Rhodes did not want to diminish Sting's growing stardom with a brief title run.

=== Jim Crockett Promotions / World Championship Wrestling (1987–2001) ===
==== Rise to stardom (1987–1989) ====
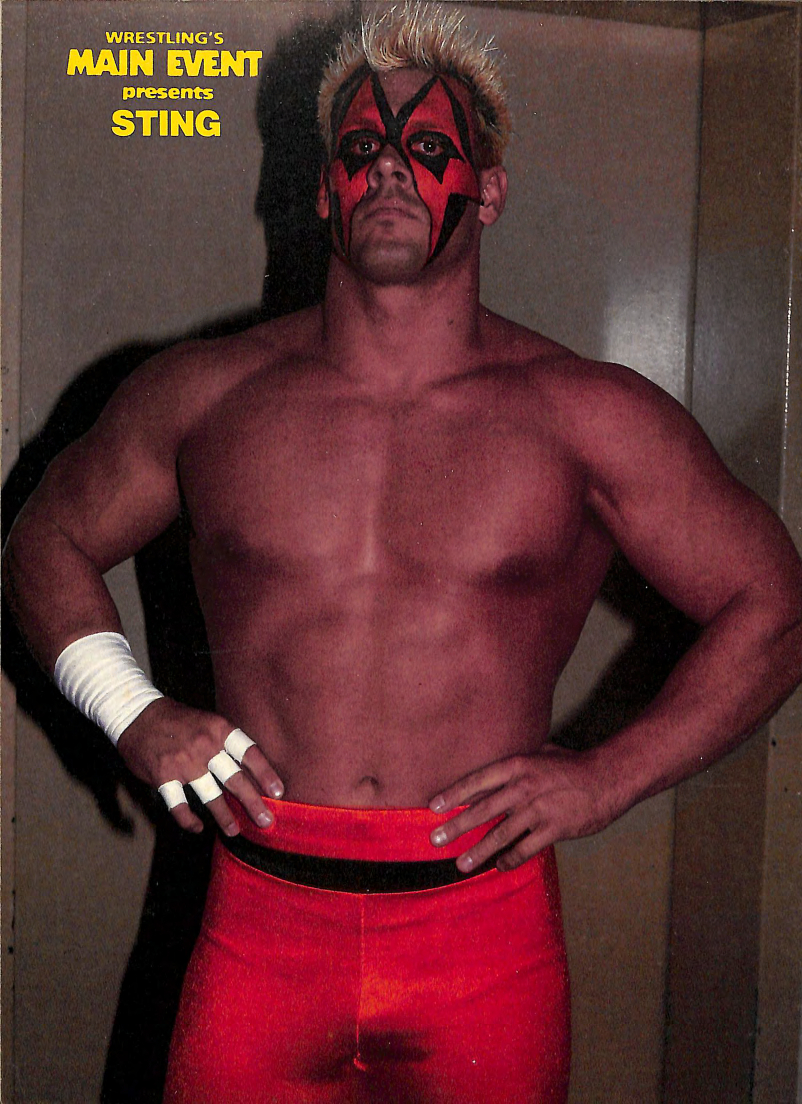
Sting in 1988

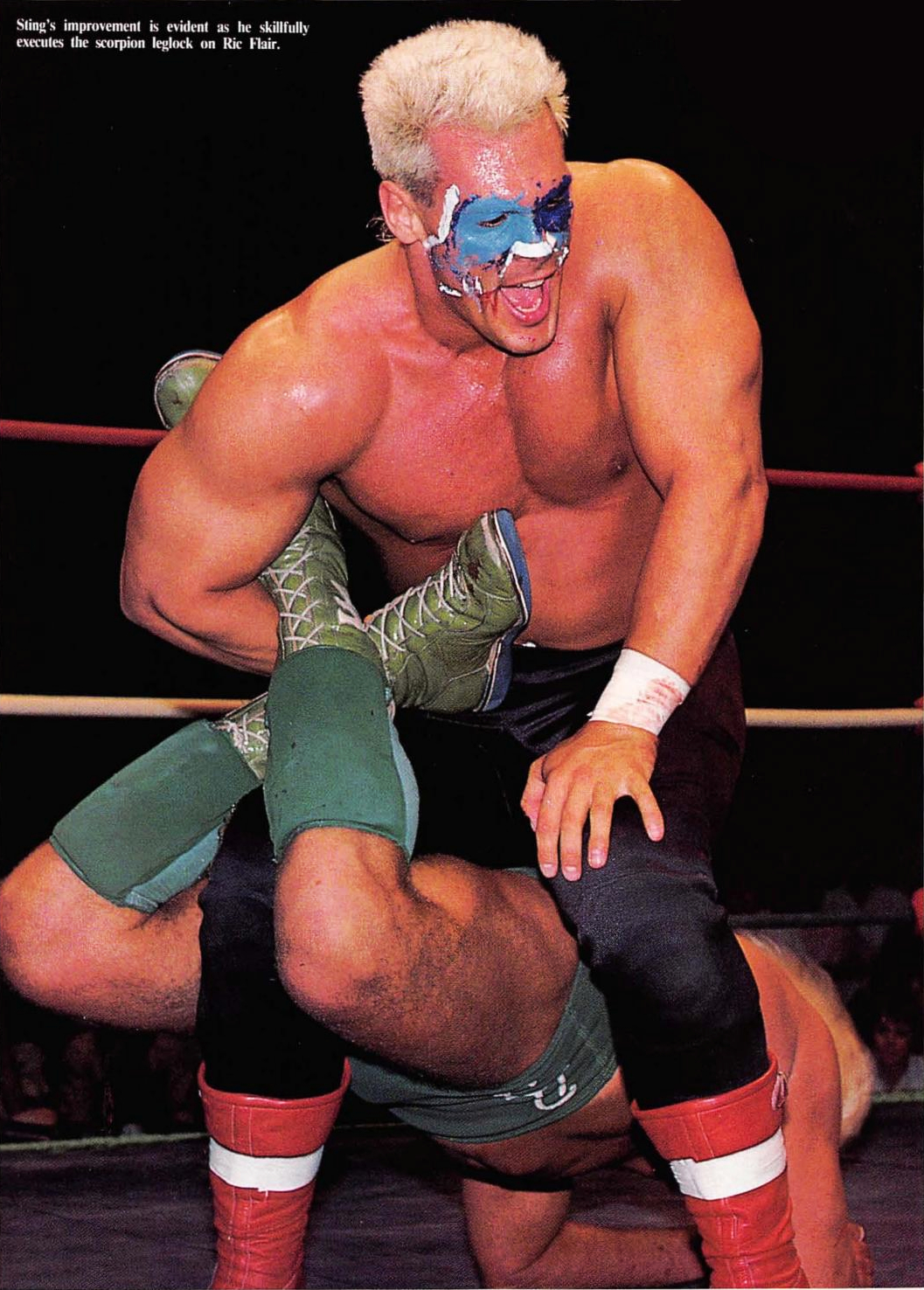
Sting applies the Scorpion Deathlock to Flair in 1988

Sometime after Sting's arrival to the NWA in July 1987, Dusty Rhodes used the opening bout of Crockett's first foray into pay-per-view, Starrcade '87: Chi-Town Heat, to showcase the young superstar. Sting partnered with Michael P.S. Hayes and Jimmy Garvin in a six-man tag team match against Gilbert, Steiner, and Larry Zbyszko that ended in a 15-minute time-limit draw.

Having established himself as a rising star, Sting was one of the few UWF alumni to be pushed in the NWA. At Clash of the Champions I in March 1988, Sting challenged Ric Flair for the NWA World Heavyweight Championship. The match ended in a draw after the 45-minute time limit expired and the ringside judges could not declare a winner. Sting lost to Flair in several non-televised rematches following the Clash and, later that year, battled other members of Flair's stable, the Four Horsemen. Sting teamed with Koloff at The Great American Bash in July 1988 to challenge Horsemen Tully Blanchard and Arn Anderson for the NWA World Tag Team Championship; Blanchard and Anderson retained the titles when the match ended in a 20-minute time-limit draw.

Rhodes continued to book Sting in title matches throughout the year against both NWA United States Champion Barry Windham and NWA Television Champion Mike Rotunda. In the fall of 1988, Sting was attacked by Hawk and Animal of the Road Warriors after a televised match. Rhodes, as booker, identified Sting as the face who was most over with the fans, despite knowing that turning the Road Warriors heel would be no easy task. Rhodes himself teamed with Sting to challenge the Road Warriors for the tag team championship at Starrcade '88 that December. Rhodes and Sting got the win by disqualification, allowing the Road Warriors to retain the titles.

Sting returned to singles matches in 1989, starting the year off by wrestling Flair to a one-hour draw in Atlanta's Omni on New Year's Day. He would also have his first experience in Japan with a brief tour in All Japan Pro Wrestling (AJPW), with his most notable match in AJPW against Dan Spivey at Nippon Budokan in June 1989. After a long push, Sting won his first title in the NWA when he defeated Rotundo for the NWA Television Championship at a live event in March. In mid-1989, The Great Muta challenged Sting at The Great American Bash. The match was booked with a classic, controversial Dusty finish even though Rhodes (the namesake of the technique) had been fired months earlier. Sting got the three-count and was announced as the winner, but a replay showed Muta's shoulder was up at the count of two. The NWA decided to declare the title vacant. Sting and Muta battled in many rematches for the vacant Television title, but they always ended in a disqualification, giving neither man the championship. Eventually, Muta won a No Disqualification match against Sting at a live event in September by using a blackjack to get the win and the title.

In the main event of that year's Great American Bash, Flair defended the NWA World Heavyweight Championship against Terry Funk, who was a member of Gary Hart's J-Tex Corporation. After Flair got the victory, he was attacked by Funk's stablemate, Muta. Sting came to the aid of his old rival Flair, and the two feuded with Muta and Funk for the rest of the summer and fall, culminating in a Thunderdome Cage match between the two teams, which Flair and Sting won, at Halloween Havoc '89. The alliance with Flair resulted in Sting joining the newly reformed and now-face Four Horsemen along with the Andersons, Arn and Ole (kayfabe cousins). Sting finished out the year by winning a four-man round-robin Iron Man tournament at Starrcade '89. In the final match of the night, Sting defeated Flair to accumulate the necessary points to win the tournament. The victory made Sting the number one contender for Flair's NWA World title, leading to tension within the Four Horsemen.

==== Feud with The Four Horsemen (1990–1991) ====
Sting was summarily dismissed from The Four Horsemen on February 6, 1990, at Clash of the Champions X: Texas Shootout after refusing to relinquish his title shot against Flair, thus restarting their rivalry. Later that evening, Borden experienced a legitimate knee injury while interfering in a steel cage match featuring the Horsemen. Borden's injury forced the bookers of World Championship Wrestling (WCW), the dominant promotion in the NWA, to find a new opponent for Flair for the forthcoming WrestleWar pay-per-view event.

Lex Luger was chosen to challenge Flair at WrestleWar. During the match between Flair and Luger, Sting came down to motivate Luger to come back and beat Flair. Before this, Sting and Luger had been at odds. When Luger was close to winning, Sting was attacked by Ole Anderson. Luger opted to save the already injured Sting and ended up losing the match by count-out while assisting his friend. Behind the scenes, WCW officials had wanted Flair to drop the title to Luger at WrestleWar, but Flair refused, saying he had promised Borden he would hold the title until Borden could return to the ring. Despite the injury, Sting was still utilized on television and pay-per-views when necessary.

At the Capital Combat event in May, Sting was accosted by the Four Horsemen and thrown into a metal cage at ringside. In a promotional crossover, Sting was rescued by his buddy RoboCop. After Borden's recovery, Sting finally defeated Flair for the NWA World Heavyweight Championship on July 7, 1990, at The Great American Bash. Sting went on to feud with title contenders Flair and Sid Vicious. Vicious appeared to defeat Sting in a title match at the 1990 Halloween Havoc, but the "Sting" that Vicious pinned was revealed to be an impostor played by Horseman Barry Windham. The real Sting appeared soon after and pinned Vicious to retain his title after the match was restarted.

During Sting's title run, a masked man known as The Black Scorpion would taunt and attack Sting on many occasions. This feud culminated in a final showdown between Sting and The Black Scorpion at Starrcade: Collision Course in December. The cage match ended with Sting pinning and unmasking the Scorpion, who turned out to be Flair in disguise.

==== WCW World Heavyweight Champion (1991–1993) ====
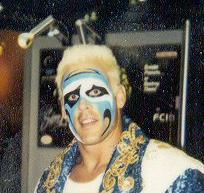
Sting in the early 1990s

Sting's first world championship reign ended January 11, 1991, when Flair defeated him in a rematch from Starrcade. In the same month, WCW seceded from the National Wrestling Alliance, in the process of recognizing a WCW World Heavyweight Championship and a WCW World Tag Team Championship. Sting then took part in what many consider to be the best match of 1991, teaming with Luger to face The Steiner Brothers at the SuperBrawl I pay-per-view for the world tag-team titles. The Steiners won by pinfall after Koloff, who had been feuding with Luger, interfered in the match by swinging a chain at Luger, but hitting Sting instead. Consequently, Sting feuded with Koloff throughout the summer of 1991. In August 1991, Sting defeated Steve Austin to win a tournament for the vacated WCW United States Heavyweight Championship. Sting held the title for 86 days before losing it to Rick Rude at Clash of the Champions XVII.

At Starrcade '91, Sting won the first-ever Battlebowl battle royal, for which he received a Battlebowl championship ring. Sting then became embroiled in a feud with the Dangerous Alliance, headed by manager Paul E. Dangerously. The stable targeted Sting because he was the so-called "franchise" of WCW, and the Alliance vowed to destroy both Sting and the promotion he was the face of. At the same time, Sting was being targeted by Luger, who had once again turned heel and, as WCW Champion, viewed Sting as a threat. Sting engaged in many matches with Dangerous Alliance members, especially Rude, who was the group's biggest star. It was during this feud that Sting won the first of his six WCW World Heavyweight Championships, defeating Luger on February 29, 1992, at SuperBrawl II. The feud ended when Sting formed Sting's Squadron, consisting of allies Ricky Steamboat, Dustin Rhodes, Windham, and Koloff, and defeated the Alliance (Rude, Austin, Arn Anderson, Zbyszko, and Bobby Eaton) in a WarGames match at WrestleWar in May 1992. Dave Meltzer awarded the match his highest rating of five stars.

Near the end of Sting's battles with the Dangerous Alliance, the seeds were sown for what became arguably one of the most famous feuds of Sting's career. Sting defended his WCW World title on April 12, 1992, at The Omni in Atlanta against the 450-pound Big Van Vader. During the match, Vader splashed Sting, cracking three of Sting's ribs and rupturing his spleen. Sting recovered and defended his title on July 12 against Vader at The Great American Bash, dropping the belt to Big Van Vader after missing a Stinger Splash, hitting his head on the ring post, and receiving a powerbomb. After beating Cactus Jack in a Falls Count Anywhere Match at Beach Blast and WCW newcomer Jake Roberts in a Coal Miner's Glove match at Halloween Havoc, Sting defeated Vader, who had lost the WCW World Heavyweight Championship in August, in the "King of Cable" tournament final at Starrcade.

The Sting-Vader feud continued into 1993, with Vader, who was again WCW World Heavyweight Champion, defeating Sting in a bloody Strap match at SuperBrawl III. Sting exacted revenge by beating Vader for the WCW World Heavyweight Championship on March 11 in London, England, but lost it back to Vader six days later in Dublin, Ireland. Sting then teamed with WCW newcomer Davey Boy Smith to beat the team of Vader and Vicious at Beach Blast in a match that was set up by a mini-movie in which an evil midget blew up Sting's boat. At the end of 1993, Sting was one of the first people to congratulate Flair, who had just returned from the World Wrestling Federation, after his WCW World Heavyweight Title victory over Vader at Starrcade.

==== WCW International World Heavyweight Champion (1994–1995) ====
Sting feuded with Vader and Rude through the first half of 1994. Sting won the WCW International World Heavyweight Championship from Rude in April. Rude recaptured the title on May 1 at Wrestling Dontaku 1994 in Japan, but the decision was reversed because Rude had allegedly hit Sting with the title belt during the match; this was to cover for a real-life back injury Rude sustained in the match that forced Rude into retirement. Sting refused to have the title handed to him, and instead defeated Vader for the vacant WCW International World Heavyweight Championship at Slamboree. Soon afterward, Flair defeated Sting in a title unification match at Clash of the Champions XXVII, turning heel in the final moments of the match when Sensuous Sherri turned on Sting and took Flair's side. Sting spent the second half of 1994 and most of 1995 teaming with WCW's newest signee, Hulk Hogan in his battles against Kevin Sullivan's Three Faces of Fear and its successor stable, The Dungeon of Doom.

At The Great American Bash 1995, Sting defeated Meng to win another tournament for the WCW United States Championship. Sting defeated Meng in a rematch for the title at Bash at the Beach 1995. Sting competed on the first-ever WCW Monday Nitro in a match where Flair defeated Sting by disqualification as a result of a run-in by Arn Anderson, who attacked Flair. At Fall Brawl, Sting teamed with Hogan, Luger, and Randy Savage to defeat the Dungeon of Doom, consisting of Kamala, Zodiac, Shark and Meng, in the event's WarGames match. In October 1995, Flair convinced Sting to team with him in a match against Anderson and Brian Pillman at Halloween Havoc. Anderson and Pillman had attacked Flair earlier in the night, rendering Flair unable to come out for the first part of the match. Sting fended off his opponents until Flair emerged. Later in the match, Flair turned on Sting and reformed the Four Horsemen with Anderson and Pillman, later adding Chris Benoit to fill out the group.

Sting defeated Flair on a subsequent Nitro with the Scorpion Deathlock, refusing to let go until Luger persuaded him to do so. Sting defeated Flair again at the World War 3 pay-per-view. Later in the night, Sting competed in the World War 3 battle royal for the WCW World Heavyweight Championship, which was won by Randy Savage. Sting's alliances with Hogan and Savage led the Horsemen to attack them as well. Sting's second U.S. title reign lasted until November 13, when he was defeated by Kensuke Sasaki in Japan. At Starrcade '94: Triple Threat, Sting defeated Sasaki, representing New Japan Pro-Wrestling, in a non-title match to win the "World Cup of Wrestling" for WCW. In the next match that night, Sting lost a triangle match involving Flair and Luger; Flair won by count-out to become number one contender for the WCW World Heavyweight Championship, which Flair won from Savage in the next match.

==== Feud with the New World Order (1996–1998) ====
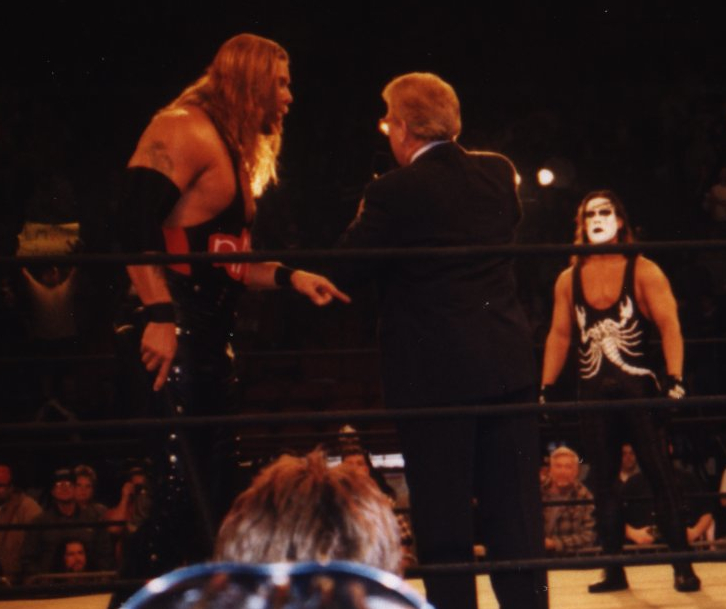
Sting (right) drastically changed his appearance in 1996 after the formation of the New World Order which included Kevin Nash (left).

Early in 1996, Sting's appearance started to change: he grew longer, darker hair, replacing his blond flattop haircut, and he often wore black tights with a multi-colored scorpion, although he occasionally wore his colorful ones and maintained his colorful face paint. Sting teamed with his old friend Luger, who had returned to WCW from WWF in September 1995, despite Luger's standing as a heel. The duo beat Harlem Heat for the WCW World Tag Team Championship on the January 22 episode of Nitro. The team often retained the championship as a result of Luger's cheating tactics, to which Sting remained oblivious. When Luger was temporarily unavailable for WCW Uncensored in March, Harlem Heat member Booker T teamed up with Sting to successfully prevent the titles from changing hands. Sting and Booker T developed a mutual respect that showed itself when Sting and Luger granted Harlem Heat a rematch. During the tag title run, Sting received a world title shot against The Giant at Slamboree in May, but lost after accidental interference from Luger. Harlem Heat eventually won the titles back on the June 24 episode of Nitro.

In the summer of 1996, Sting was the first WCW competitor to stand up to The Outsiders: Kevin Nash and Scott Hall, who had recently competed in the WWF, whose alliances and agenda were unclear, and who had been infiltrating and causing chaos at various WCW events. Sting teamed with Luger and Savage to defend WCW against Hall, Nash, and a mysterious third Outsider to be revealed at the Bash at the Beach. Hall and Nash started the bout without their third partner, but the WCW's temporary three-on-two advantage was short-lived: Luger left the match after he was accidentally injured by a mistimed Stinger Splash. The two-on-two match continued until Hulk Hogan, who had been a face character for nearly fifteen years, emerged at ringside. Hogan appeared ready to back up the WCW wrestlers, until he attacked Savage with his leg drop finisher in one of wrestling's most famous swerves. The match was ruled a no-contest, and Hall, Nash, and Hogan declared a new world order in professional wrestling. The name stuck, and Sting became one of WCW's stalwarts against the New World Order, or nWo for short.

As part of this, Sting and Luger went up to rivals and Four Horsemen members Ric Flair and Arn Anderson some time after Bash at the Beach and asked them to team with him, saying that they needed to put aside their personal differences for the greater good of WCW. Flair and Anderson agreed and the four wrestlers composed Team WCW for the annual WarGames match at Fall Brawl in September 1996. They would be facing the nWo's team of Hall, Nash, Hogan, and a fourth member yet to be determined. On the final Nitro prior to the event, however, the nWo played a trick on WCW claiming that Sting was joining their side. A vignette was shown where the nWo had a recording of Sting's voice playing in its limousine as Luger was being lured into the parking lot. Once he was there a man dressed as Sting, played by Jeff Farmer, attacked him and the crowd at home, as well as the live audience and commentators, were led to believe that Sting had joined up with the nWo and would be their fourth man against what was now a three-man WCW team. Sting, however, was not at that episode of Nitro, and showed up at Fall Brawl just as his teammates declared that they would face the nWo by themselves. Sting told Luger that he did not attack him, but Luger refused to believe him. Later, during the match, Sting entered as the fourth and final man for Team WCW, after the impostor Sting had entered for the nWo. Once in the ring, Sting immediately took out all four members of the nWo. He then stopped, turned to Luger, and angrily said to him, "Is that good enough for you right there? Is that proof enough?!?" Sting then gave Luger an obscene gesture and walked out of the match, leaving Team WCW at a four-on-three disadvantage, which they did not overcome. The next night on Nitro, Sting came out unannounced during the middle of the show with no music or entrance pyrotechnics. He entered the ring and, with his back turned to the camera side of the audience, launched into an angry tirade about what had transpired over the last week:

Declaring he would visit "from time to time", Sting threw the microphone down and left the ring. Days after the infamous promo, he was booked for shows in New Japan Pro-Wrestling, to take part in the Japan/U.S. Superstars Tournament, where he defeated Masahiro Chono in the first round, but was eliminated in the second round by Shiro Koshinaka. His last match of 1996 took place on September 23 at the Yokohama Arena, where he and Lex Luger teamed up to defeat Arn Anderson and Steven Regal. It would end up being his last tour of Japan. On the October 21 episode of Nitro, Sting returned for the first time since the night after Fall Brawl in a match where the impostor Sting was wrestling Mr. JL. Sting emerged wearing a trench coat and white face paint with black marks around his eyes. He went in the ring and attacked nWo Sting (who was still imitating Sting's old mannerisms at this point) with his new finisher, an inverted DDT dubbed the Scorpion Death Drop, two jumping elbow drops, a Stinger Splash and a Scorpion Deathlock while the rest of the nWo stood around ringside. Rather than intervene and save their stablemate, they simply stood by and watched. After Sting was done, the nWo came into the ring. Ted DiBiase, Scott Hall, and Kevin Nash made Sting an offer to join the nWo and get back at WCW for betraying him. Sting, after a slight pause, first called out the nWo Sting as a "cheap imitation," before telling the nWo, "the real Sting may or may not be in your price range," and then concluded by saying "the only thing that's for sure about Sting is nothing's for sure". With that, Sting left the ring and would not speak (on the microphone) on WCW programming again for over a year. A silent, almost ghostly Sting, carrying a baseball bat as a weapon, began appearing in the rafters at WCW events and began painting his entire face with black and white corpse paint. In retaliation, nWo Sting, who was still imitating Borden, began painting his face this way as well. Sting's new gimmick was directly inspired by the title character of the 1994 film The Crow starring Brandon Lee portraying the film character, and Borden credits Scott Hall for suggesting the idea of the "Crow" character. Sting still maintains the core aspects and aesthetic of his "Crow" persona to this day, occasionally with different designs and use of color integrated into the face paint.

In subsequent weeks, Sting frequently rappelled from the rafters or came up through the ring to attack unsuspecting nWo members, came to the aid of wrestlers who were once subjected to his loyalty test as they battled the nWo, and employed decoy "Stings" to play mind games with the nWo during the closing segments of Nitro. Sting's appearances to fight the nWo at the end of almost every Nitro helped WCW keep and widen its television ratings advantage over the WWF's Monday Night Raw throughout the summer. In the midst of all this, on-screen WCW commissioner J. J. Dillon tried many times to get Sting to return to wrestling by making contracts to fight various nWo members. Sting, however, did not accept any of the contracts, often tearing them up in Dillon's face. Finally, during an episode of Nitro, a confused and frustrated Dillon asked Sting who he wanted to face. Sting went out to ringside, picked up a fan's sign, and pointed out one name on it: Hogan. Eventually, Sting got his wish and he and Hogan finally met in December at Starrcade for the WCW World Heavyweight Championship. The finish of the match was supposed to echo the Montreal Screwjob finish that the WWF had used to double-cross Bret Hart just one month earlier at their annual Survivor Series event. Nick Patrick, the referee for the contest, was supposed to execute a fast count on Sting while Hart, whose signing with WCW was the linchpin for the Montreal Screwjob, would come out to protest the decision and, since he had already served as the guest referee for the match between Larry Zbyszko and Eric Bischoff earlier that evening, order the match to be restarted and Sting would emerge victorious by forcing Hogan to submit to the Scorpion Death Lock. However, Patrick did not do his part properly and instead counted the pin at normal speed, which added an unintentional level of controversy to the finish.

The next night on Nitro, Hogan protested the decision claiming that Patrick's decision should have been considered final and a rematch was granted. The match ran over Nitro's allotted time slot and the finish was aired later in the week on the inaugural episode of Thunder. Similar to the Starrcade result, two different referees declared both men as the winner. Later that night, Dillon vacated the WCW World Heavyweight Championship, forcing Sting to surrender the belt. Sting responded with his first words (on mic) since October 1996 when he told Dillon, "You've got no guts!" Sting turned to Hogan and said, "And you... You're a dead man!".

==== The Wolfpac (1998–1999) ====
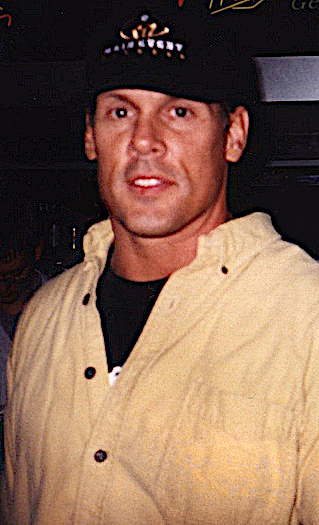
Borden after a taping of WCW Monday Nitro in 1998

As 1998 began, the nWo began to splinter. Sting recaptured the vacant WCW World Heavyweight Championship in February at SuperBrawl VIII with the help of Savage, who was beginning to split from the nWo. Sting went on to successfully defend the title against the likes of Hall, Nash, and Diamond Dallas Page (DDP). Like Savage, Nash began to pull away from the Hogan-dominated nWo, and Nash helped Savage beat Sting for the championship at Spring Stampede in April. Nash and Savage officially split from the original nWo on May 4, forming the face group nWo Wolfpac, while Hogan's heel faction became identified as nWo Hollywood. The two nWo factions vied for Sting's allegiance, with Sting's friends The Giant joining nWo Hollywood and Luger joining nWo Wolfpac. Sting seemed to have joined nWo Hollywood when he appeared wearing a black and white nWo shirt, but he soon tore off the shirt to reveal the red and black of the nWo Wolfpac. Sting began wearing red and black face paint and tights as a member of nWo Wolfpac.

Sting and The Giant won the WCW World Tag Team Championship at Slamboree in May when Hall turned on his teammate Nash. Sting and The Giant then split due to each man joining opposite sides of the nWo, and the team was forced to vacate the titles 18 days later. Sting then defeated The Giant at The Great American Bash in June to take control of the Tag Team titles and chose Nash as his partner. Throughout the summer, Sting and fellow nWo Wolfpac members Nash, Luger, and Konnan feuded with Hogan and nWo Hollywood. Sting also got involved in a feud with Bret Hart over their similar finishing holds, the Sharpshooter and the Scorpion Deathlock. Hart cost Sting and Nash the Tag titles by interfering in their match with Hall and The Giant on the July 20 Nitro. Sting and Hart squared off at Halloween Havoc, where Hart, the United States Champion, attacked Sting with a baseball bat, putting Sting out of action for several months. Ironically, Hart would eventually be pinned by Sting after he himself fell afoul of a baseball bat, wielded by Lex Luger, eleven months later.

Sting returned to Nitro in March 1999, sporting the black and white Crow-inspired attire he debuted in 1996 and began to participate in more mic work. By this time, the nWo storyline had faded, and Sting was not aligned with any of its factions. Sting competed in the main event of April's Spring Stampede, a Four Corners match for the World Championship, against Hogan, DDP, and champion Flair. Savage served as special guest referee and delivered a diving elbow drop to help DDP win the match and the title.

==== Final world title reigns (1999–2000) ====
Sting defeated Page on the April 26 episode of Nitro to win the WCW World Heavyweight Championship for the fifth time. Later that night, Sting defended the title in a four-way match featuring DDP, Goldberg, and a returning Nash. DDP pinned Nash, allowing DDP to win the title without directly beating Sting. Sting's 90-minute reign was only the second shortest WCW World Heavyweight Championship reign in WCW history. Sting lost to Rick Steiner in a Falls Count Anywhere match at The Great American Bash on June 13 after he was attacked by Steiner's three pet dogs backstage and Steiner forced the referee to prematurely declare himself the victor, claiming his dogs had pinned Sting for him.

Over the next several months, Sting feuded with Goldberg, Rick Steiner, Vicious, and Savage. Sting teamed with WCW World Heavyweight Champion Nash at the Bash at the Beach on July 11 to take on Vicious and Savage of Team Madness. Savage pinned Nash and won the World title as a result. Hogan returned from injury on July 12 as a face to win the WCW World Heavyweight Championship. Sting defeated Flair on the July 19 episode of Nitro to become the on-screen president of WCW. Later that night, Nash turned heel by attacking Hogan during a title defense against Vicious. Sting remained president for just one week and used his power to book a main event pitting Hogan and himself against Nash and Vicious. Sting vacated the presidency the following week because he only wanted Flair out of the position rather than wanting the power for himself. Along with Goldberg, Sting and Hogan feuded with Nash, Vicious and Rick Steiner for the next month.

Sting began to question Hogan's trustworthiness and credibility in the weeks leading up to Fall Brawl on September 12. At Fall Brawl, Luger brought a baseball bat to the ring and Sting used it to beat Hogan for his sixth and final WCW World Heavyweight Championship, turning heel for the first time in WCW. Sting's heel turn and subsequent attitude change did not resonate with the WCW fans. They still cheered Sting despite the fact he was supposed to be the villain (reminiscent of the Road Warriors' heel turn in late 1988). It was during this heel turn that Sting and Luger, with helpful interference from DDP, defeated supposed faces Hogan and Hart in a tag-match, Sting pinning Hart after Luger hit him with a bat. Then, at Halloween Havoc on October 24, Sting retained the WCW World Heavyweight Championship against Hogan after Hogan entered the ring in street clothes and lay down for Sting to pin him. After the match, Sting sounded his disdain of the result and issued an open challenge for later tonight. Later that night, Sting lost an unsanctioned match to Goldberg, who accepted his open challenge and then attacked referee Charles Robinson. Sting was stripped of the title the next night for attacking the official.

Sting entered the 32-man tournament that was set up to award the vacant WCW World Heavyweight Championship. Sting defeated Brian Knobs, Meng, and Luger to reach the semi-finals to be held at WCW Mayhem on November 21. At Mayhem, Sting lost to Hart, the eventual winner of the tournament, by disqualification after ostensibly "bungled" interference by Luger (in fact payback for Sting's quarterfinal win). On the November 1 episode of Nitro, Luger expressed a desire for them to win the WCW tag team titles, against Sting's desire to continue pursuing the WCW World title, which led to Luger- who was also pursuing the WCW World Heavyweight Championship in same tournament Sting was in- faking a knee injury and refusing to help Sting after Sting was attacked following a match the two had for the WCW Tag Team titles against Billy Kidman and Konnan. This led to a falling out with Luger, as well as his return to being a fan favorite, with Sting and Luger attacking each other the following week. Sting would then defeat Luger in a quarterfinal match on the November 15 episode of Nitro. At Mayhem, the fallout with Luger was completed when Luger attacked Sting in his match with Bret Hart. Initially, Sting lost to Hart, the eventual winner of the tournament, by disqualification after ostensibly "bungled" interference by Luger (in fact payback for Sting's quarterfinal win). However, Hart asked for an immediate rematch, which was granted, and won by submission to advance to the final. After the match, Sting shook hands with Hart in a sign of respect, turning face again. Sting sought revenge against Luger the next month at Starrcade on December 19. Sting won by disqualification when Luger and Miss Elizabeth assaulted Sting with a steel chair and baseball bat, putting Sting out of action for some time. Sting ended his feud with Luger by defeating him in a Lumberjacks with Casts match at Uncensored on March 19, 2000.

==== Last feuds and contract expiration (2000–2001) ====
On April 10, 2000, WCW officials Vince Russo and Eric Bischoff, in an attempt to save the fading company, rebooted all current storylines and declared all titles vacant. At Spring Stampede the following week, Sting advanced to the finals of the United States Championship tournament by defeating Booker T and Vampiro in the first two rounds. Vampiro then cost Sting the championship in the finals against Scott Steiner, leading to an intense feud between Sting and Vampiro. Sting pinned Vampiro at Slamboree on May 7, and Vampiro beat Sting in a Human Torch match at The Great American Bash on June 11; for the climax of the match, Borden switched with a stuntman, who was set on fire and thrown off the top of the frame of the stage's entrance video screen. At Bash at the Beach on July 9, he returned wearing another Sting mask as men wearing cloaks and Sting masks carried him in a casket, attacking Vampiro. At New Blood Rising, Sting defeated The Demon. At Fall Brawl, Sting defeated The Great Muta and Vampiro in a three-way match.

Sting went on to feud with Jeff Jarrett where he lost to him at Halloween Havoc. on the November 15 episode of WCW Thunder, Scott Steiner trapped Sting in a straitjacket and injured him in what was his final televised appearance until the final Nitro. At Millennium Final, Sting defeated Kevin Nash to win the WCW European Cup. Sting remained absent from WCW programming until the final episode of Nitro on March 26, 2001. By this point, WCW had been purchased by the World Wrestling Federation (WWF), and the final match in WCW history pitted Sting against his longtime rival Flair; the two had also competed on the first episode of Nitro on September 4, 1995. Sting defeated Flair and the two embraced at the end of the contest.

After the WWF chose not to buy out Sting's contract with AOL Time Warner, he rejected a buyout offer of 50 cents on the dollar from AOL Time Warner, instead waiting until his contract expired in March 2002 (he announced a short-lived retirement in February of that year). Borden then entered into contract negotiations with the WWF, but ultimately did not join the promotion.

=== World Wrestling All-Stars (2002–2003) ===
In November 2002, after over a year-and-a-half of hiatus, Borden toured Europe with the World Wrestling All-Stars (WWA) promotion throughout November and December. His first match in the WWA took place on November 28, 2002, in Dublin, Ireland, where he reunited with Lex Luger to defeat Buff Bagwell and Malice. At The Retribution on December 6, 2002, in Glasgow, Scotland, United Kingdom, Sting lost to Luger in a bout for the vacant WWA World Heavyweight Championship. Sting defeated Luger to claim the WWA World Heavyweight Championship in Zürich, Switzerland, on December 13.

Sting embarked on a second tour with WWA in May 2003, successfully defending his championship against Rick Steiner, Shane Douglas, and Disco Inferno. The WWA held its final show, The Reckoning, on May 25 in Auckland, New Zealand, where NWA World Heavyweight Champion Jeff Jarrett defeated Sting for the WWA World Heavyweight Championship, unifying the two championships.

=== NWA Total Nonstop Action / Total Nonstop Action Wrestling (2003–2014) ===
==== Sporadic appearances (2003–2004) ====
In 2003, Sting signed a contract committing him to four appearances with the NWA Total Nonstop Action (NWA/TNA) promotion. He debuted in TNA on the June 18, 2003 one-year anniversary show, teaming with Jeff Jarrett to defeat AJ Styles and Syxx-Pac. Following this, Borden engaged in a comprehensive series of sit down interviews with Mike Tenay, discussing his career and his faith. Sting returned to TNA on November 5, 2003, defeating Jarrett by disqualification in a match for the NWA World Heavyweight Championship. On November 12, Sting teamed with Styles to defeat Jarrett and Lex Luger. He made his final TNA appearance of 2003 on December 17, defeating Jarrett in a non-title match. On March 24, 2004, Borden was interviewed once again by Mike Tenay as part of the promotion for his direct-to-video biographical film, Sting: Moment of Truth, and on March 31, he returned to the company for one night only as the special guest enforcer for the main-event, a four-way match between Styles, Abyss, Raven, and Ron "The Truth" Killings, which Raven won.

Sting would wrestle in the independent circuit in 2004 and 2005, only competing in two matches. On July 21, 2004, Sting teamed up with The Great Muta defeating Diamond Dallas Page and Satoshi Kojima at HCW Battle Hawaii in Honolulu, Hawaii. Then on January 22, 2005, he defeated Billy Gunn at NWA Mid-Atlantic in Seoul, South Korea.

==== Feud with Jeff Jarrett (2005–2006) ====
On December 11, 2005, at Turning Point, as Jeff Jarrett stood in the ring celebrating his victory, the lights in the arena went out as images of a scorpion — Sting's signature symbol — appeared on the arena screens, along with the date "January 15, 2006". Spotlights then illuminated the ring, revealing a chair bearing Sting's signature trench coat, boots, and a black baseball bat in the center of the ring. His return to TNA was officially announced one minute after midnight on the January 1, 2006 episode of Impact!. On January 15 at Final Resolution, Sting and Christian Cage defeated NWA World Heavyweight Champion Jeff Jarrett and Monty Brown in a tag team match after Sting pinned Jarrett. On the January 28 episode of Impact!, Sting made his Spike TV debut and first appearance on national television in almost five years, announcing his retirement.

With Sting gone, the storyline continued with Jeff Jarrett and Eric Young worrying that Sting had not actually retired and sending Alex Shelley to California to videotape Sting at home. Sting eventually discovered Shelley filming, then walked up to Shelley's car and told him that he was going to show up at Destination X and confront Jeff Jarrett as Steve Borden. Clad in street clothes and without face paint, Borden returned on March 12 at Destination X, saving Christian Cage and Rhino as they were attacked by Jarrett's Army. He then placed Jarrett in the Scorpion Deathlock, but was attacked by the debuting Scott Steiner shortly thereafter. This led to a Lethal Lockdown match between Sting, AJ Styles, Ron Killings, and Rhino against Jarrett's Army. On April 23 at Lockdown, Sting's team won the match. Following Lockdown, Sting proceeded to seek out partners to help him defeat Jeff Jarrett and Scott Steiner for good. After bringing out Lex Luger, Buff Bagwell, and Rick Steiner as potential options, he settled on Samoa Joe. On May 14 at Sacrifice, Sting and Joe defeated Jarrett and Steiner after Joe pinned Jarrett with a Muscle Buster. Still having proven unsuccessful at putting Jarrett away, Sting defeated Scott Steiner by disqualification to earn a spot in the King of the Mountain match for the NWA World Heavyweight Championship at Slammiversary on June 18. However, due to a confrontation with Christian Cage during the match, Sting was distracted, allowing crooked referee Earl Hebner to knock over the ladder both were on, sending both men to the floor and allowing Jarrett to pick up the victory.

On July 16 at Victory Road, Sting won a fatal four-way match to earn a title shot at Jarrett's NWA World Heavyweight Championship. Sting received his title shot on August 13 at Hard Justice, but failed to capture the title after Christian Cage turned heel and hit Sting with Jarrett's guitar. Sting would have another match at Bound for Glory on October 22, putting his career on the line as an added stipulation. He went on to claim his second NWA World Heavyweight title when he made Jarrett submit to the Scorpion Deathlock, marking the first major championship title Sting had won since 1999. With that victory, Sting became the oldest NWA World Heavyweight Champion of the TNA era, as well as the only person to ever win the title both before and after the inception of TNA. This would also go on to make Sting the longest superstar to recapture his second NWA title from 1990 to 2006 (16 years).

Sting lost the title to Abyss on November 19 at Genesis by disqualification after pushing aside the referee and pushing Abyss into a stack of tables covered in barbed wire. In the weeks following Genesis, Sting's feud with Abyss continued and Christian Cage was involved, leading to a three-way match for the NWA World Heavyweight Championship on December 10 at Turning Point, where Abyss retained the title.

==== TNA World Heavyweight Champion (2007–2008) ====
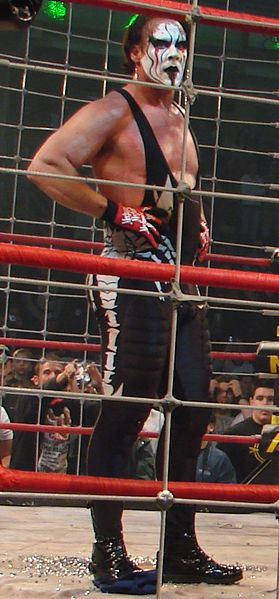
Sting at Lockdown in April 2007

Sting continued his feud with Abyss while trying to recapture the NWA World Heavyweight Championship, facing him at Final Resolution on January 14, 2007, Against All Odds on February 11 and Destination X on March 11 in a Last Rites match, but he never claimed the title. Also, Abyss and Sting were placed in different teams in the Lethal Lockdown match at Lockdown on April 15. Sting, with the help of Jeff Jarrett, pinned Abyss to win the match for his team and end their bitter rivalry.

At Sacrifice on May 13, a match between Sting, Kurt Angle and NWA World Heavyweight Champion Christian Cage was booked. However, on the day of Sacrifice, the National Wrestling Alliance (NWA), the owners of the NWA World Heavyweight and the NWA World Tag Team Championships, stripped Cage of the world title and Team 3D of the tag team titles. NWA Executive Director Robert K. Trobich stated the reason was that Cage refused to defend the NWA Title at NWA live events. At Sacrifice, Cage, still holding the physical NWA Championship belt, defended what was billed as the "World Heavyweight Championship" against Sting and Angle. Angle was the victor of said contest by making Sting submit, and was announced as the new "TNA World Heavyweight Champion". The Impact! following the event, the title was labelled as the "TNA World Heavyweight Championship", but the title was vacated. A tournament was then held for the title which culminated in a King of the Mountain match at Slammiversary on June 17. Sting lost his qualifying match with Samoa Joe after Christopher Daniels interfered. Sting instead faced Daniels at Slammiversary, which he ultimately won.

After his feud with Daniels, Sting began teaming up with his former enemy, Abyss, who had recently turned face. Together, the two went on to defeat AJ Styles and Tomko on July 15 at Victory Road. While trying to help Abyss win a match against Styles, Sting and Abyss were attacked by Christian's Coalition. Abyss was pulled under the ring and Sting was slammed into broken glass by Tomko, before Abyss emerged bleeding profusely, before being slammed into the broken glass and thumbtacks. The following week, Sting and Abyss got revenge by defeating Christian and Styles in a ladder match, in the process earning a contract that allowed them to pick the type of match between Abyss and Christian at Hard Justice on August 12. Sting's team won in a "Doomsday Chamber of Blood" match, with Abyss pinning Styles to become the number one contender for the TNA World Heavyweight Championship.

After that, Sting started a feud with the TNA World Heavyweight Champion Kurt Angle. First, on the August 30 episode of Impact! Sting defeated Styles, Christian Cage, and Samoa Joe in a four-way match to become the co-holder of the TNA World Tag Team Championship with Angle, but lost it 10 days later against Adam "Pacman" Jones and Ron Killings at No Surrender on September 9. However, he would lose the title back to Angle just eleven days later on Impact!, when Kevin Nash interfered on Angle's behalf. Sting would face Angle and Nash at Genesis on November 11, with the debutant Booker T as his mystery partner. As per the stipulation, whoever scored the pinfall in the match would win the TNA World Heavyweight Championship, which Angle won after pinning Sting to retain the TNA World Heavyweight Championship. This would be the final TNA appearance of Sting in 2007, as he would take some time off to be with his family.

Sting then made his official return on the March 27, 2008 live episode of Impact!. At Lockdown on April 13, he teamed with Team Cage (Christian Cage, Kevin Nash, Rhino, and Matt Morgan) and defeated Team Tomko (Tomko, AJ Styles, James Storm, and Team 3D). After the TNA World Tag Team Championship was vacated, Jim Cornette held a Deuces Wild Tag Team Tournament to determine the new champions. Four teams were already in the Sacrifice finals, while Cornette named eight wrestlers as the "Egotistical 8". Sting's partner was James Storm and on May 11 at Sacrifice on May 11, they came up short due to their inability to get along, and towards the end, Sting attacked Storm and walked out. Sting was not seen after that except in an interview which talked about his career and his eventual retirement.

On July 13 at Victory Road, Booker T faced Samoa Joe for the TNA World Heavyweight Championship. During the match, Sting tried to talk sense into Joe, as he was brutally beating Booker T, and was potentially heading towards a disqualification. Joe rebuked him, and Sting struck him with his trademark black baseball bat. Over the coming weeks, the feud between Joe and Booker T intensified, with episodes ending with either Booker T or Sharmell striking Samoa Joe with Sting's trademark bat as Impact! went off the air, leading to a question of whether or not Sting had turned on Samoa Joe and became a heel. Although still receiving a face reaction from the fans, Sting sided with Booker T. On August 10 at Hard Justice, Sting attacked Styles after he and Kurt Angle wrestled a Last Man Standing match.

==== Main Event Mafia (2008–2009) ====
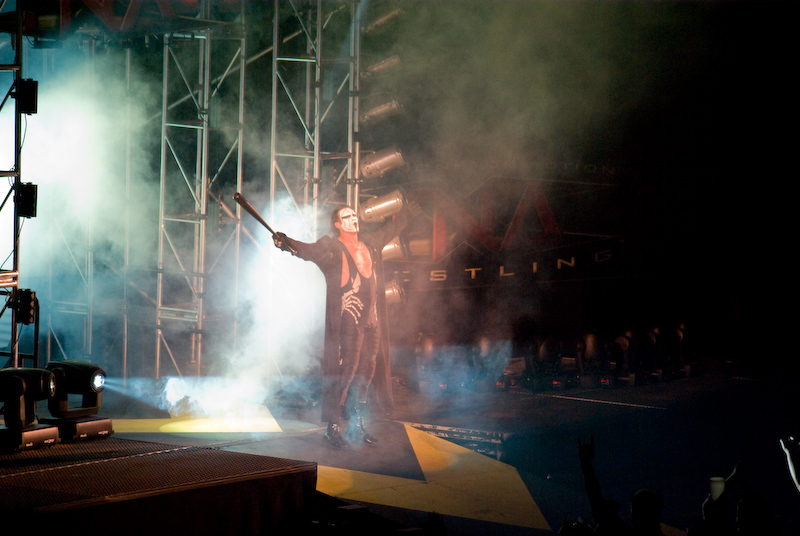
Sting at Bound for Glory IV

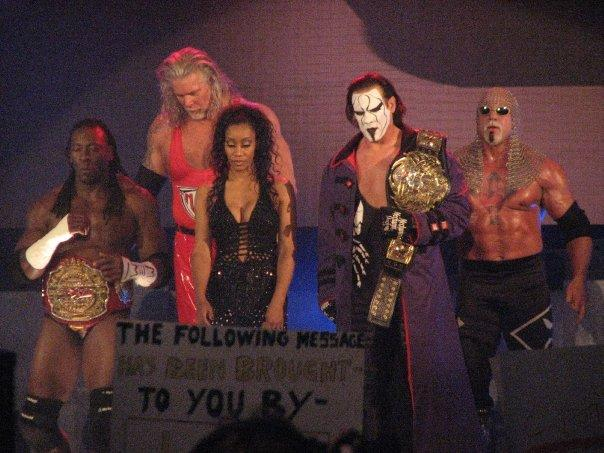
Sting with The Main Event Mafia

On October 12, 2008, at Bound for Glory IV, Sting defeated Samoa Joe to win the TNA World Heavyweight Championship after Kevin Nash returned and hit Joe with Sting's baseball bat. After Bound for Glory, Sting, along with Kurt Angle, Booker T, Kevin Nash and Scott Steiner created the Main Event Mafia, a stable formed by veterans and former World Champions. The faction feuded with younger wrestlers, dubbed the TNA Frontline. Sting defended the TNA World Heavyweight Championship against Frontline's AJ Styles at Turning Point on November 9 and Rhino on January 11, 2009, at Genesis. Sting also feuded with the leader of the Main Event Mafia, Kurt Angle. At Against All Odds on February 8, 2009, Sting defended the title against Angle, Brother Ray and Brother Devon. He then faced off with Angle in a singles match at Destination X on March 15. At Lockdown on April 19, Sting lost the TNA World Heavyweight Championship to Mick Foley inside the Six Sides of Steel, ending his reign at 189 days (his longest world title reign for any organization).

On May 24 at Sacrifice, Sting defeated Kurt Angle to become the new "godfather" of the Main Event Mafia. On June 21 at Slammiversary, Sting defeated Matt Morgan in a singles match, thus preventing Morgan from joining the Main Event Mafia. On the following episode of Impact!, Sting's fellow Main Event Mafia members attacked him, removing him from the group, and Kurt Angle reclaimed his role as "godfather". The following week, Sting took his revenge upon the Mafia, when he attacked every member of the group and stole Angle's world heavyweight championship belt, becoming a full-fledged face as a result. On July 19 at Victory Road, Sting was defeated by new Main Event Mafia member Samoa Joe in a singles match after the debuting Taz interfered on Joe's behalf.

On August 16, 2009, at Hard Justice, Sting unsuccessfully challenged Angle for the TNA World Heavyweight Championship in a triple threat match, which also included Matt Morgan. On September 20 at No Surrender, Sting lost a five-way match for the TNA World Heavyweight Championship that also included AJ Styles, Hernandez, Kurt Angle, and Matt Morgan. Instead of pinning Angle, he opted to attack Morgan, allowing Styles to pin Angle and become the new TNA World Heavyweight Champion. As a token of gratitude, Styles offered to give him a title shot at the following month's PPV Bound for Glory on October 18 in a match billed as possibly being Sting's retirement match. At Bound for Glory, Styles defeated Sting to retain his title, ending Sting's undefeated streak at Bound for Glory. After the match, Sting announced that he didn't know whether he would continue his career or not, saying that "the way you fans are reacting right now, makes me wanna stay forever!" At the end of the year, the match was voted the match of the year by the fans of TNA.

==== Feud with Immortal (2010–2011) ====
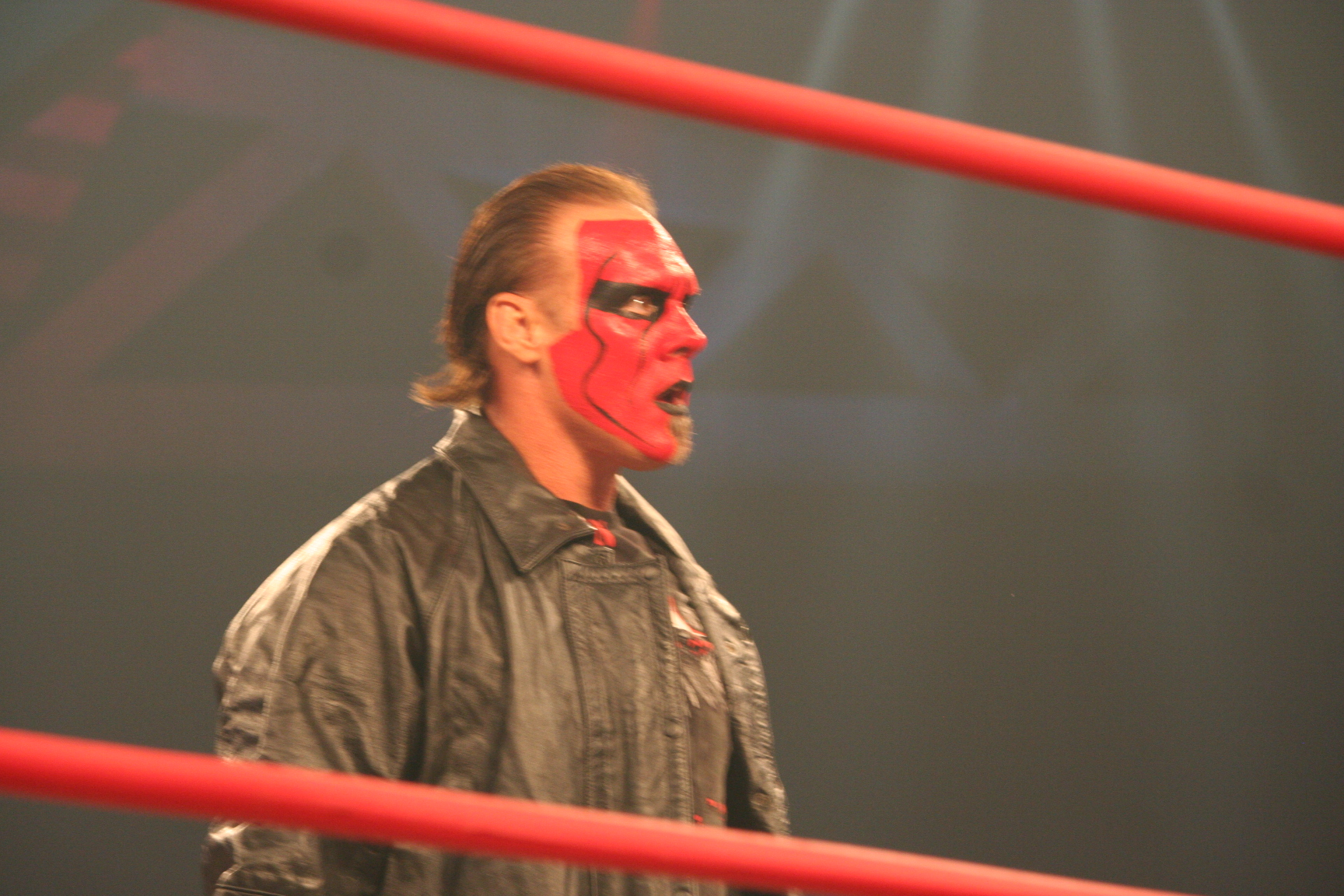
Sting with red face paint in July 2010

On the January 4, 2010, live-three-hour, Monday night episode of Impact!, Sting returned to the Impact! Zone appearing in the rafters of the arena. Sting reappeared two months later on the March 8 episode of Impact!, attacking Hulk Hogan and Abyss during a match against AJ Styles and Ric Flair, turning heel as a result. He was later defeated by the debuting Rob Van Dam. During the following months, Sting would join other heel wrestlers against face wrestlers like Van Dam, Jarrett or Hogan. At Lockdown on April 18, Team Flair (formed by Sting, Desmond Wolfe, Robert Roode and James Storm) were defeated by Team Hogan (Abyss, Jeff Jarrett, Rob Van Dam and Jeff Hardy). After defeating Jeff Jarrett at Sacrifice on May 16, Sting faced Rob Van Dam for the TNA World Heavyweight Championship at Slammiversary VIII on June 13. However, during the match, Jarrett made his return and cost Sting the title.

After assaulting Jarrett from behind on the June 24 episode of Impact!, TNA president Dixie Carter (storyline) suspended Sting for 30 days. When he returned, Sting changed his gimmick, wearing his nWo Wolfpac red face paint, and was paired with Kevin Nash. They would start a feud with Jeff Jarrett and Samoa Joe, facing them No Surrender on September 5 and Bound for Glory on October 10, where Sting, Nash and D'Angelo Dinero defeated Jarrett and Joe after Jarrett turned heel by leaving the ring and having Joe wrestle alone. At the end of Bound for Glory, it was revealed that Sting had been right about Hogan and Bischoff all along, as they turned heel along with Jarrett and Jeff Hardy as Abyss's "they". This consequentially turned Sting, Nash and Dinero back to being faces. On the October 14 episode of Impact!, Sting and Nash refused to join Hogan, Bischoff and their new group, Immortal. After the promo, they walked out on TNA, although Nash had legitimately left TNA. Borden took a hiatus from TNA television, as his contract had expired at the end of 2010.

Sting returned on the March 3, 2011 episode of Impact!, where he appeared as a surprise challenger and defeated Immortal's Jeff Hardy to win the TNA World Heavyweight Championship for the third time, debuting a new hybrid attire paying homage to his Surfer, Crow and Wolfpac attires. On March 13 at Victory Road, Sting successfully defended the title against Hardy in a No Disqualification rematch that lasted 90 seconds. According to word from backstage, the match was planned to last longer, but it was cut short after Hardy was deemed too intoxicated to wrestle. Sting was later heard agreeing with a fan's claim that the match was "bullshit". The following month at Lockdown on April 17, Sting successfully defended the title against Mr. Anderson and Rob Van Dam in a three-way steel cage match, against Van Dam at Sacrifice on May 15, and against Anderson at Slammiversary IX on June 12, where he lost the title following outside interference from Eric Bischoff.

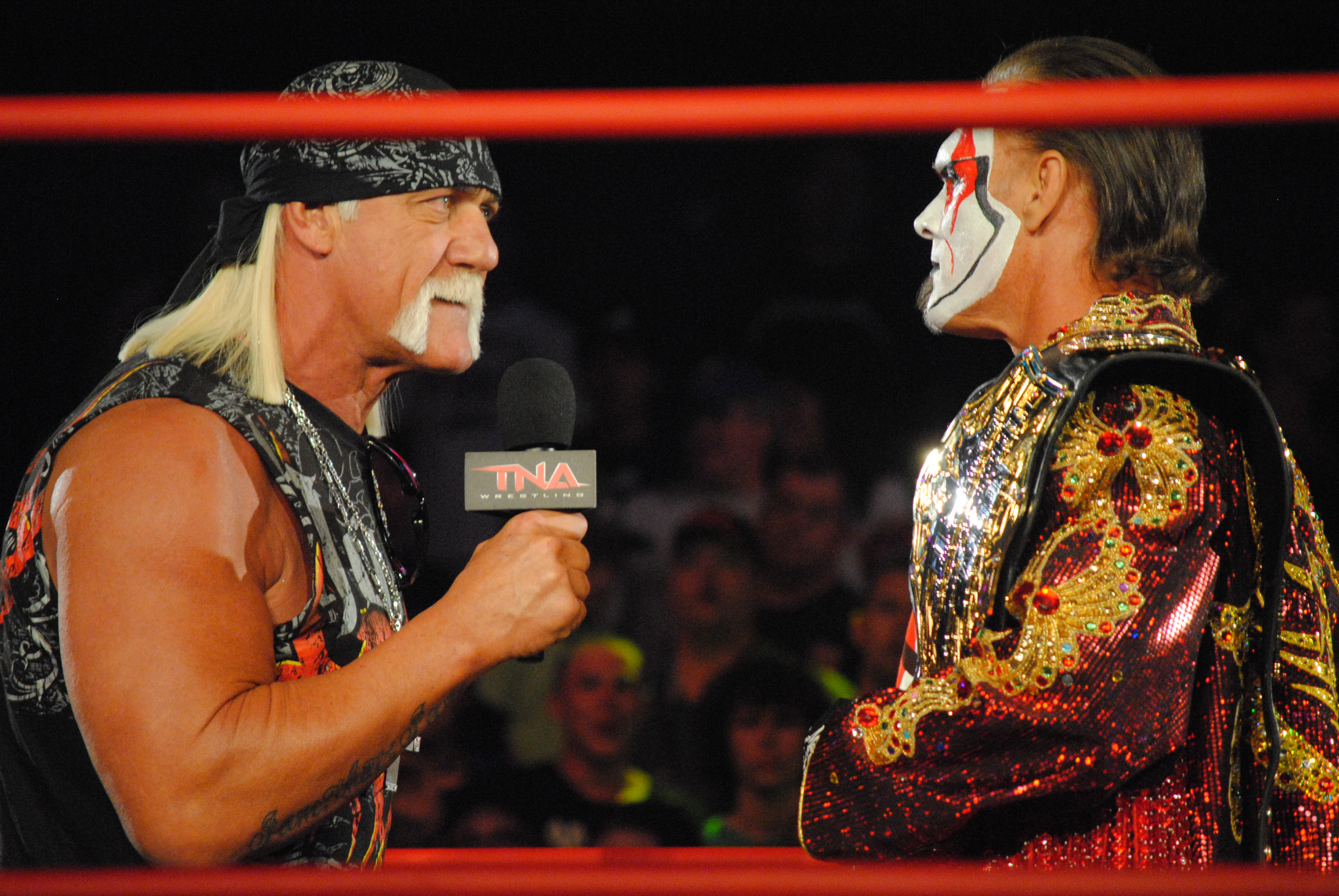
Hulk Hogan and Sting in 2011

Over the next few weeks, Sting began displaying a more maniacal character similar in look and style to Heath Ledger's portrayal of the Joker from the 2008 film The Dark Knight. On the July 14 episode of Impact Wrestling, Sting, now dubbed as the "Insane Icon", regained the TNA World Heavyweight Championship from Mr. Anderson after Fortune and Kurt Angle, disguised as his clown minions, attacked each member of Immortal, preventing them from interfering in the match. He would go on to lose the title to Kurt Angle on August 7 at Hardcore Justice, after Angle hit him with a chair that was brought to the ring by Hulk Hogan. Sting continued tormenting members of Immortal with his strange new personality, and on the August 18 episode of Impact Wrestling, his longtime rival Ric Flair made his return to TNA and challenged him to a match. Sting agreed to put his career on the line in the match in exchange for Flair promising to deliver him his long-awaited match with Hogan, should he be able to defeat him. On the September 1 episode of Impact Wrestling, Sting received a rematch against Angle for the TNA World Heavyweight Championship, but was defeated following interference from special enforcer Hulk Hogan and the rest of Immortal. On September 11 at No Surrender, Hogan once again cost Sting the TNA World Heavyweight Championship in a three-way match, which also included Mr. Anderson. On the September 15 episode of Impact Wrestling, Sting defeated longtime rival Ric Flair to earn the right to face Hogan at Bound for Glory on October 16. On the October 6 episode of Impact Wrestling, after being exposed for his false claim of retiring and his secret ridicule of the fans, a furious Hogan impulsively agreed to hand TNA back to Dixie Carter, should Sting manage to defeat him at Bound for Glory. At Bound for Glory, Sting defeated Hogan to bring Dixie Carter back to power. After the match, Hogan turned on Immortal and helped Sting overcome the odds in his battle with the stable. On the following episode of Impact Wrestling, Carter placed Sting in charge of the program. Sting returned to the ring on the December 22 and February 9, 2012, episode of Impact Wrestling, where he teamed up with Jeff Hardy to defeat TNA World Heavyweight Champion Bobby Roode and Bully Ray.

==== Final feuds and departure (2012–2014) ====
During the first months of 2012, Sting feuded with the TNA World Heavyweight Champion Bobby Roode. He was defeated by Roode at Victory Road on March 18 in a non-title No Holds Barred match, and at Slammiversary on June 10 in a title match. During this time, he also left the General Manager position in favor of Hulk Hogan, signed a new contract extension with TNA and was announced as the first inductee into the TNA Hall of Fame.

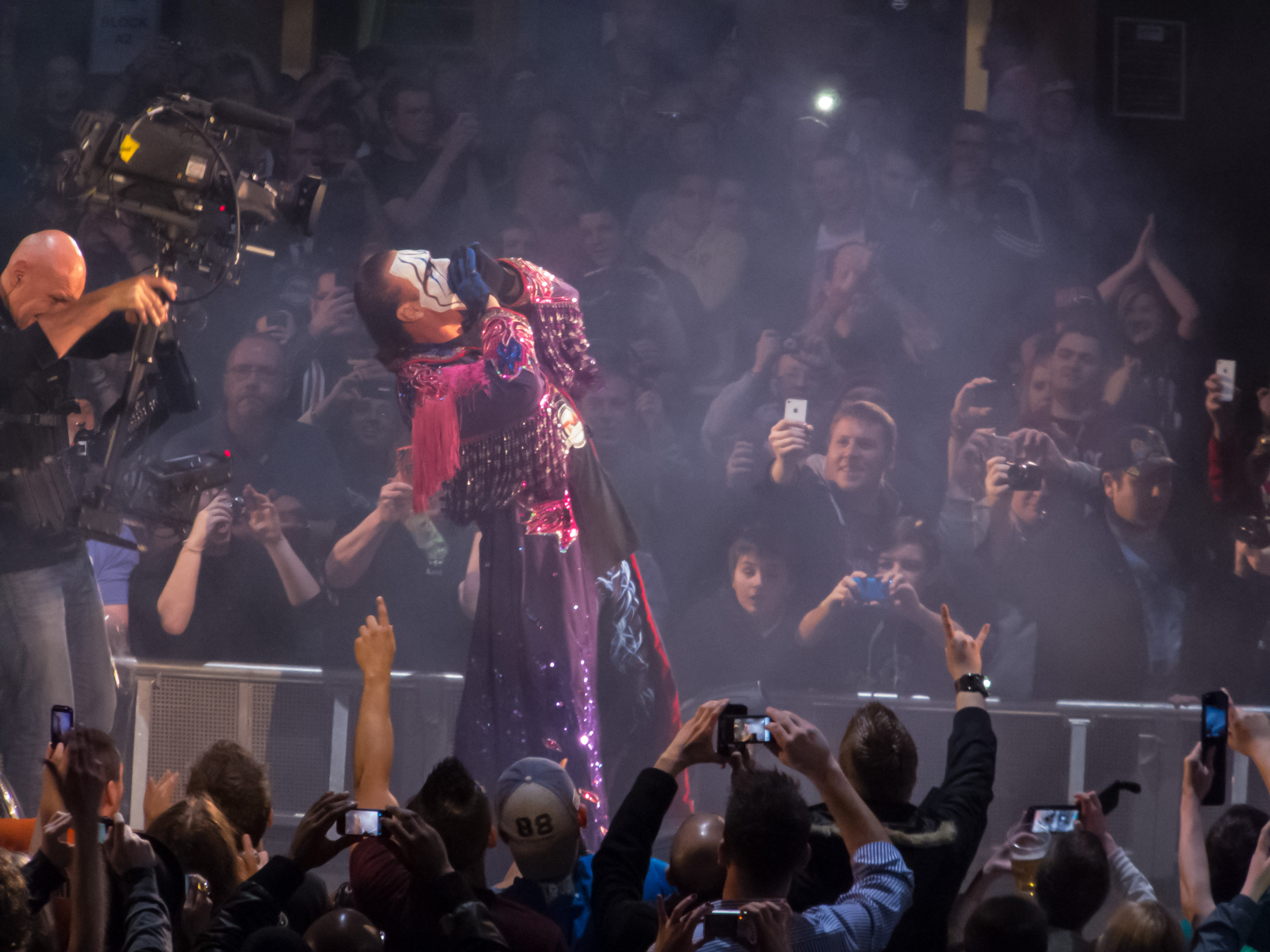
Sting in January 2013

His next feud was against a newly formed masked faction called "Aces & Eights", where he was appointed as the interim general manager after Hogan took a hiatus due to a back injury. The feud led to a match at Bound for Glory on October 14 alongside Bully Ray, where they were defeated by the Aces & Eights, following interference from a man who was afterwards unmasked as Ray's longtime partner, the returning Devon. As a result of their win, the Aces & Eights earned full access to TNA. On the following episode of Impact Wrestling, Sting defeated Devon via disqualification, following interference from the Aces & Eights. On the November 8 episode of Impact Wrestling, Sting was sidelined with a storyline injury, after being put through a table and beaten with a ball-peen hammer by DOC, a member of Aces & Eights.

Sting returned on the January 3, 2013, episode of Impact Wrestling, saving Kurt Angle and Samoa Joe from Aces & Eights before beating the group down with a baseball bat. Sting wrestled his return match the following week, defeating Aces & Eights member Mike Knox after he injured Kurt Angle. Three days later at Genesis, Sting gained his revenge on DOC by defeating him in a singles match. On the February 7 episode of Impact Wrestling, Sting teamed up with Bully Ray to defeat Devon and DOC in a Tables match. On March 10 at Lockdown, Team TNA, consisting of Sting, Eric Young, James Storm, Magnus, and Samoa Joe defeated Aces & Eights, consisting of Devon, DOC, Garett Bischoff, Mike Knox, and Mr. Anderson in a Lethal Lockdown match. After Bully Ray won the TNA World Heavyweight Championship and revealed himself as the president of Aces & Eights later that night, Hulk Hogan blamed Sting, as he had encouraged Hogan to give Ray the title shot, while also encouraging Hogan to support Ray's marriage with his daughter Brooke. Sting then proceeded to walk out on Hogan. Sting returned on the April 25 Impact Wrestling, saving Hogan from an attack by the Aces & Eights. The following week, Sting reconciled with Hogan and became the number one contender to the TNA World Heavyweight Championship later that night after defeating Matt Morgan. On June 2 at Slammiversary XI, Sting unsuccessfully challenged Bully Ray for the TNA World Heavyweight Championship in a No Holds Barred Match after an interference by Aces & Eights. Per stipulation, Sting would never get another title opportunity again.

On the June 13 episode of Impact Wrestling, Sting noted that nobody in the back helped him during his title match, but he would form a New Main Event Mafia to battle the Aces & Eights. In the following weeks, Sting would recruit Kurt Angle, Samoa Joe, Magnus, and Rampage Jackson as members of the New Main Event Mafia. Before Bound for Glory on October 20, MEM member Magnus complained to Sting because of his constant losses. Magnus was told by Sting he had Flair to put him on the map, but Magnus had nobody, so Sting challenged him to a match at Bound for Glory, seemingly as a way to pass the torch. At Bound for Glory, Sting was defeated by Magnus. On the October 31 episode of Impact Wrestling, Dixie Carter offered to lift the lifetime ban so Sting can get another World title opportunity again by entering him first in a Battle Royal Gauntlet match, which was won by Magnus as Sting attempted to eliminate Kazarian, and Magnus eliminated the both of them. Sting then disbanded The Main Event Mafia after Aces & Eights disbanded, and while other members began to chase their TNA World Heavyweight Championship dreams, Sting started a feud against Ethan Carter III and Dixie Carter after they began humiliating TNA Legends, like Curry Man and Earl Hebner at the behest of Carter. On the December 12 episode of Impact Wrestling, Carter was confronted by Sting, and was issued an ultimatum: either face Sting immediately, or enter the Feast or Fired match. Carter entered the Feast or Fired match, and grabbed one of the briefcases. On the December 19 episode of Impact Wrestling, the Feast or Fired briefcase revealed to contain a future TNA World Tag Team Championship match, and also led to the firing of Chavo Guerrero. On the January 16, 2014 episode of Impact Wrestling: Genesis, Sting lost a match to Ethan Carter III, due to interference from the TNA World Heavyweight Champion Magnus and subsequently challenged Magnus to a Title vs. Career match for the January 23 episode of Impact Wrestling: Genesis, which Sting lost, and his TNA contract was terminated as a result.

At Slammiversary, on June 19, 2022, Sting appeared in a video message to congratulate Impact Wrestling, which had changed its name from TNA in 2017, on their 20th anniversary.

=== WWE (2014–2020) ===
==== Pre-debut appearances (2014) ====
Veteran professional wrestling journalist Bill Apter chronicled Sting's career in a piece for WWE.com on February 19, 2014, wherein he stated that Sting's "best days may still be yet to come". He appeared in a WWE Network production on April 15, sharing a story of his former tag team partner Ultimate Warrior, who had recently died. This marked Sting's first non-archive appearance on a WWE-branded show. Sting was a prominent contributor to the documentary film Warrior: The Ultimate Legend, which premiered on the WWE Network on April 17. The following day, online retailer Zavvi announced the upcoming WWE Home Video DVD and Blu-ray release The Best of Sting. The three-disc set released on September 23. On July 14, Sting appeared in a vignette on Raw to promote the video game WWE 2K15, in which he was featured as a pre-order bonus character in both his 'Crow' and 'Surfer' (pre-1996) incarnations. That same day, WWE began selling official Sting merchandise. On July 24, Borden made his first public appearance for WWE, in full Sting garb, as a special surprise guest at San Diego Comic-Con. The event was held to announce WWE's upcoming line of Mattel action figures, in which the company's first-ever Sting figure would appear. Prior to that appearance, Sting gave his first interview with WWE.com, which was released later that day. On August 4, WWE announced Sting as a guest on the WWE 2K15 "Roster Reveal" panel, which took place on August 16 in Los Angeles.

==== Feud with The Authority (2014–2015) ====
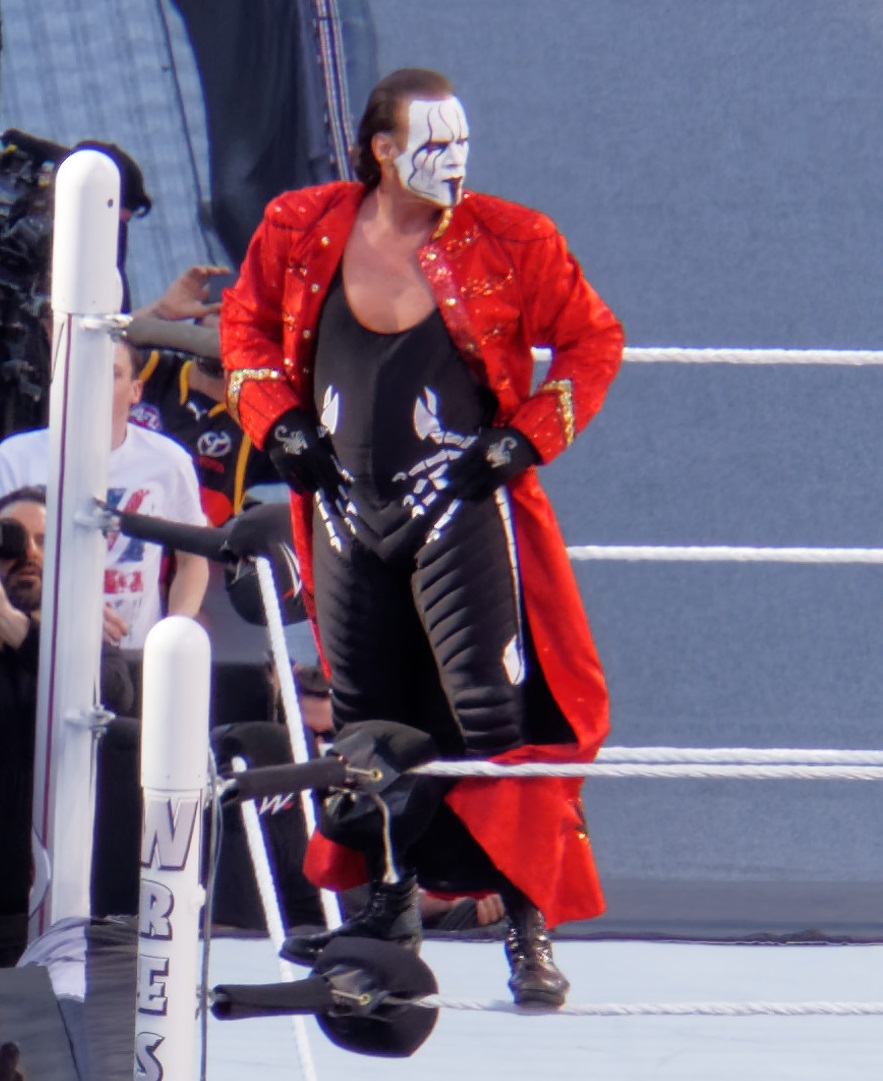
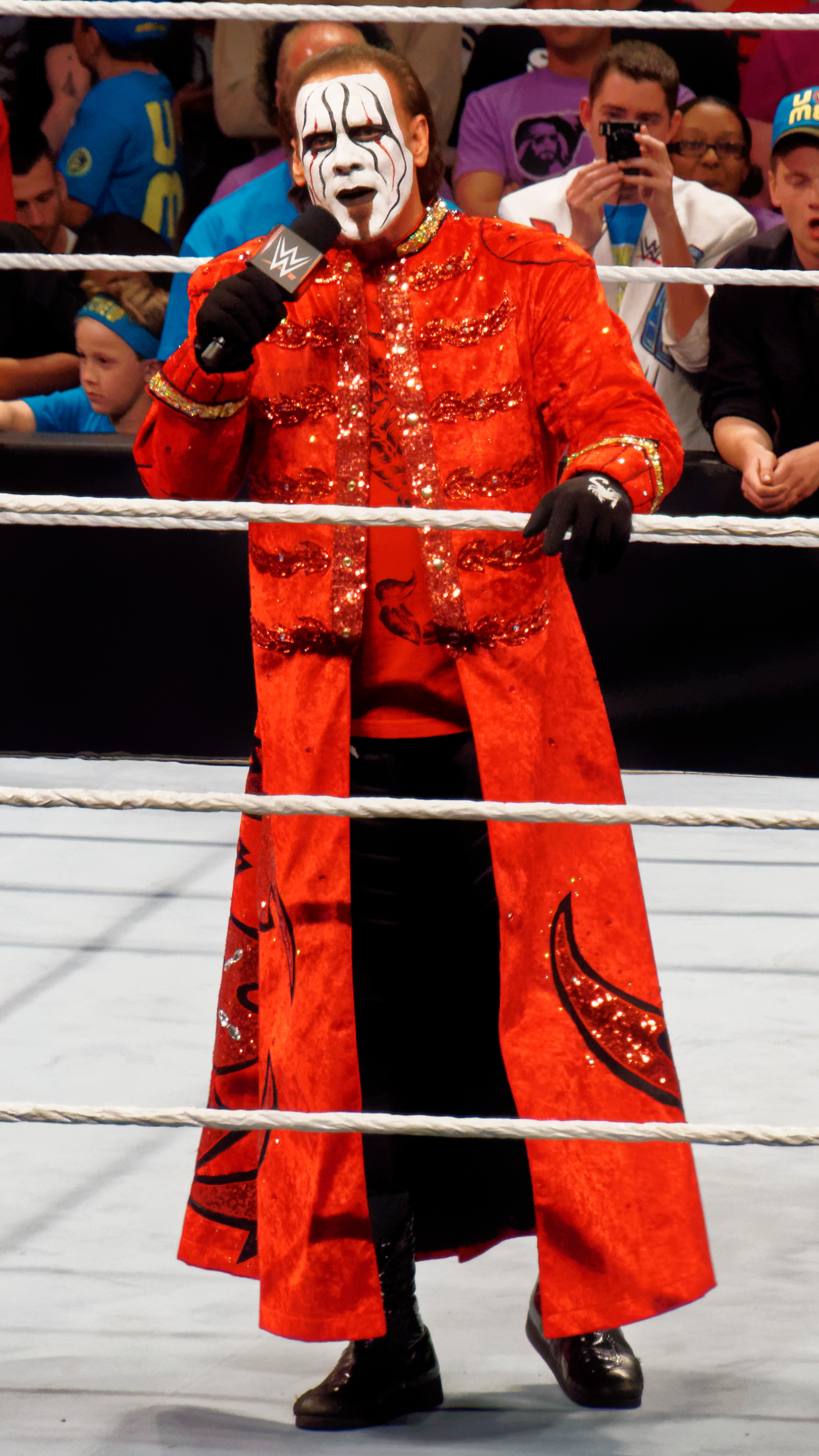
Sting in 2015: at WrestleMania 31 (left) and on the March 30 episode of Raw (right)

On November 23, during the main event of Survivor Series, Sting made his WWE debut by attacking Triple H with a Scorpion Death Drop and also costing Team Authority the match. Sting feuded with Triple H, leading to a match at WrestleMania 31, where he lost in a match involving interference from members of both D-Generation X (DX) and the New World Order (nWo).

Sting returned on the August 24 episode of Raw, challenging Seth Rollins for the WWE World Heavyweight Championship at Night of Champions. Sting defeated Big Show by disqualification in his first match on Raw, as a consequence of Rollins attacking Sting. That same night, a second match was booked with John Cena and Sting defeating Show and Rollins. At Night of Champions, Sting was defeated by Rollins and experienced a legit neck injury after a turnbuckle powerbomb. Sting later told Bill Apter that he does not blame Rollins for his injury, describing the incident as a "freak accident".

==== Hall of Fame and first retirement (2016–2020) ====
It was announced on the January 11, 2016, episode of Raw that Sting would be the first member of the WWE Hall of Fame Class of 2016. Sting ultimately reneged on having surgery; on March 22, he explained that he felt "completely normal" and had none of the side effects commonly associated with cervical spinal stenosis. On April 2, during his WWE Hall of Fame induction speech, Sting announced his first retirement from professional wrestling. He appeared at WrestleMania 32, alongside his fellow 2016 inductees, the following night.

In August 2016, Sting appeared on the WWE Network show Legends with JBL and talked about his career. He also stated that he had still not undergone surgery, which would definitively end his career, and he still held hope for a match with The Undertaker, claiming that such a match is his "unfinished business" in wrestling. However, the match would never happen as despite Sting pitching the idea for a cinematic match with The Undertaker, it was never approved, and The Undertaker himself officially retired in 2020.

On the February 25, 2019, episode of Raw, Sting made his first appearance on WWE television since 2016 for the 70th birthday celebration of Ric Flair, but Flair was attacked by Batista before he could make it to the ring. This would end up being Sting's final appearance for the company, other than interviews recorded for WWE Network.

In May 2020, it was reported that Sting was no longer under WWE contract. In October 2020, WWE stopped selling Sting merchandise and pulled his page from WWE Shop.

=== All Elite Wrestling (2020–present) ===
==== Teaming with Darby Allin (2020–2023) ====
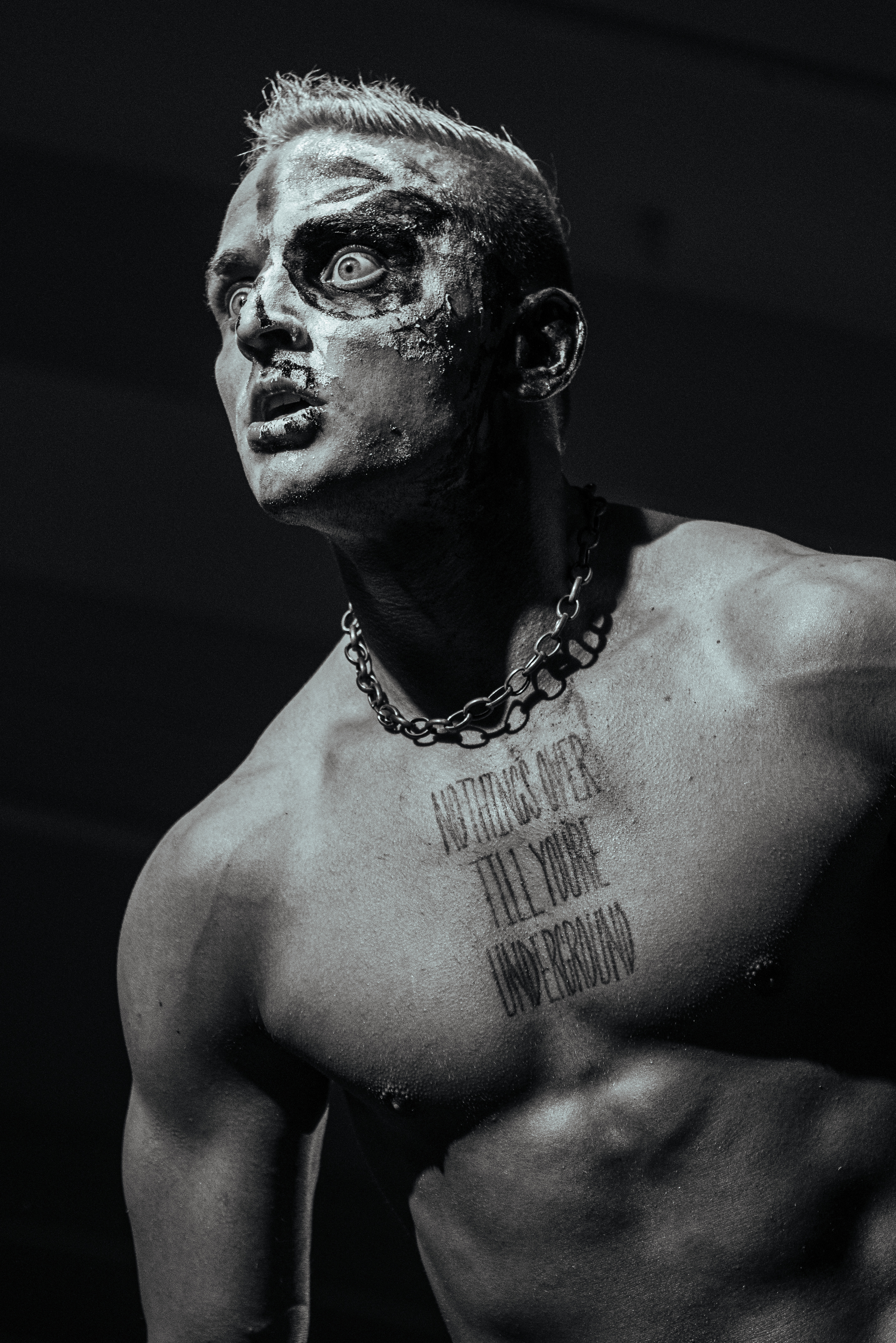
Throughout his time in AEW, Sting was paired with Darby Allin. On-screen, the two were portrayed as mentor and protégé. The team went undefeated, winning the AEW World Tag Team Championship once with Sting retiring as champion.

On December 2, 2020, Sting made his All Elite Wrestling (AEW) debut after a tag team match that pitted Cody Rhodes and Darby Allin against Powerhouse Hobbs and Ricky Starks at Dynamite: Winter Is Coming. This marked his first appearance on TNT since the final episode of Nitro in 2001. It was later announced that Sting had officially signed a multi-year contract with AEW.

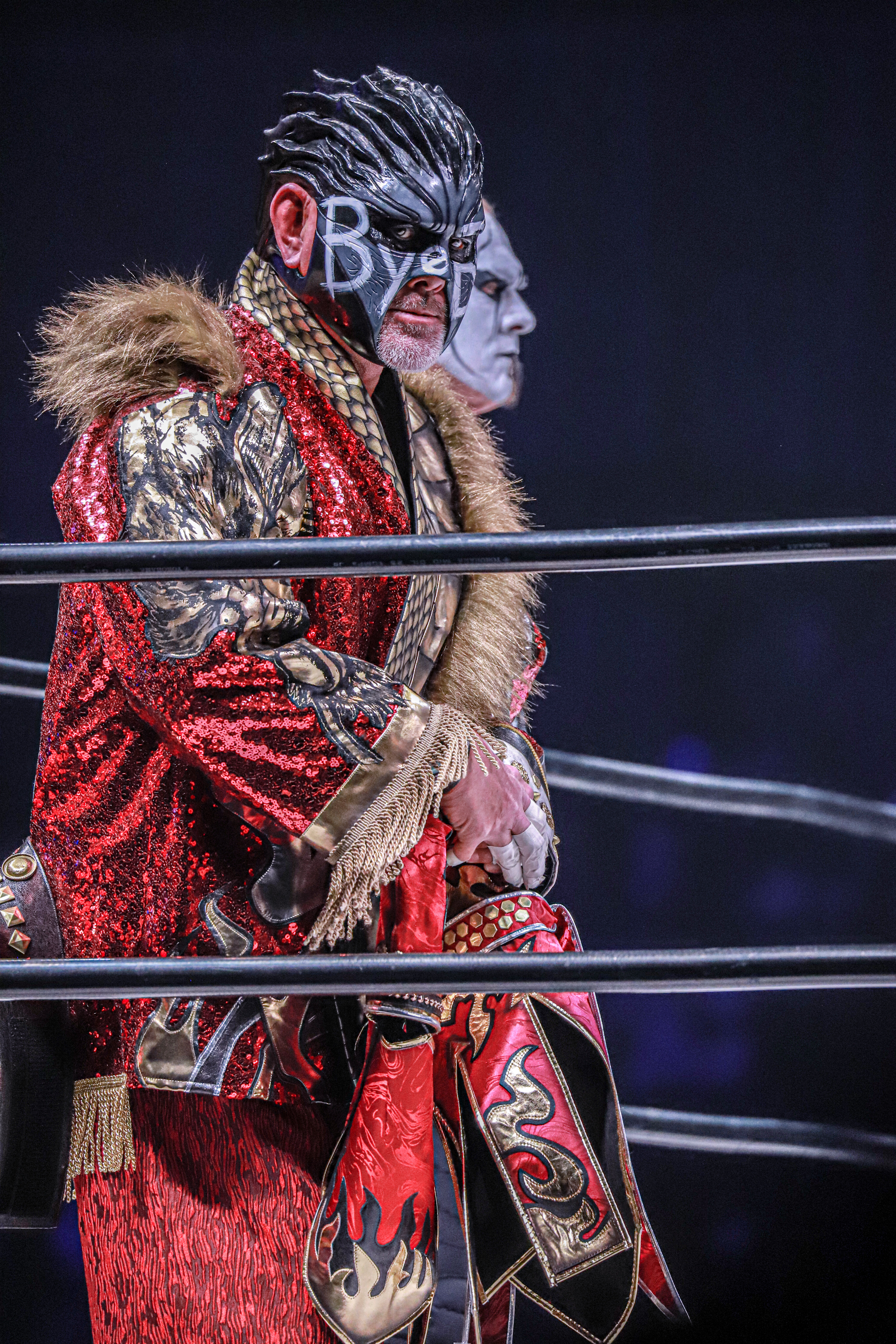
Sting standing behind the Great Muta in January 2023. Muta made the save on him and Darby Allin at Rampage: Grand Slam, owing to their appearance at The Great Muta Final "Bye-Bye"

Sting's first match with AEW took place at Revolution teaming with Darby Allin and defeating Team Taz (Brian Cage and Ricky Starks) in a Street Fight, which was pre-taped on location.

Sting and Allin kept working as a tag team. Sting had initially planned to only appear in cinematic matches for AEW, but Allin convinced him to compete in live events beginning with Double or Nothing, which was his first live match in front of a crowd since WWE Night of Champions in 2015. They also defeated the team of Scorpio Sky and Ethan Page at AEW's marquee event Double or Nothing. He also worked on multi-man tag team matches on special television episodes and PPVs, like Dynamite: Holiday Bash, Revolution, AEW x NJPW: Forbidden Door, and All Out. At Rampage: Grand Slam, Sting and Darby Allin defeated the House of Black (King and Matthews). During the Grand Slam match, Sting's long-time in-ring rival The Great Muta made a surprise appearance to rescue Sting from an attack by Matthews.

As result, Sting then took part in The Great Muta Final "Bye-Bye" on January 22, 2023, marking Sting's only Pro Wrestling Noah appearance where he teamed with Allin and Muta in Muta's final match. Sting, Allin, and Muta defeated Akira, Hakushi, and Naomichi Marufuji in a trios match.

At Forbidden Door on June 25, 2023, Sting, Allin, and Tetsuya Naito defeated the team of Chris Jericho, Sammy Guevara, and Minoru Suzuki.

In the summer of 2023, Sting and Allin entered into a feud with the Mogul Embassy stable, after Allin's longtime friend AR Fox turned heel, attacked Allin, and joined Allin's rival Swerve Strickland in the group on the July 26 Dynamite. Sting appeared as his "Joker" persona on the August 16 Dynamite in a segment featuring Mogul Embassy member Prince Nana. The next day, Sting and Allin made a surprise appearance at a World Wrestling Alliance 4 show in Atlanta to attack Fox. Sting, Allin, and Nick Wayne saved Fox from an attack by Strickland and Brian Cage on the August 23 Dynamite after Fox was fired from Mogul Embassy, and Allin and Fox reconciled. Sting (with his "Joker" persona) and Allin defeated Strickland and Christian Cage in a coffin match at All In on August 27, 2023.

In the fall of 2023, Sting and Allin feuded with Christian Cage and Luchasaurus. At WrestleDream on October 1, Wayne betrayed Sting and Allin and joined Cage's group. Sting and Allin were then attacked by Cage, Luchasaurus, and Wayne, but were saved by Adam Copeland in his AEW debut.

==== Final matches and second retirement (2023–2024) ====
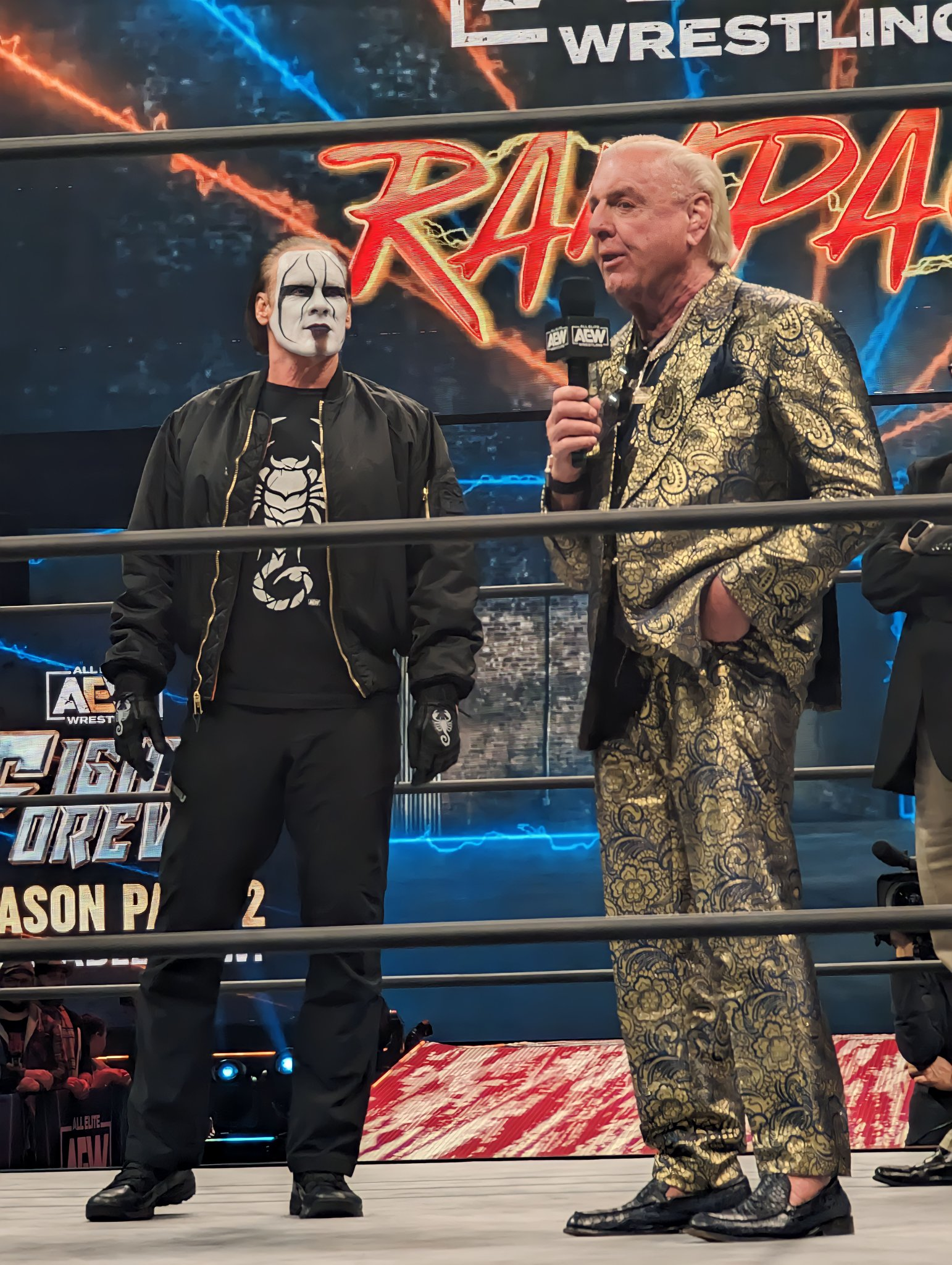
Sting (left) and Ric Flair (right) doing a promo in 2023

On the October 18, 2023, episode of Dynamite, Sting announced that he would be retiring from in-ring competition in 2024, with his final match to be held at Revolution on March 3 that year. On the October 25 episode of Dynamite, Sting's longtime NWA and WCW rival Ric Flair made his debut for AEW as a surprise gift from AEW co-owner and president Tony Khan, with Flair saying he would be in Sting's corner for his final match. Sting, Allin, and Copeland then defeated Cage, Wayne, and Luchasaurus in a six-man tag team match at Full Gear on November 18.

On the February 7, 2024, episode of Dynamite, Sting and Allin defeated Ricky Starks and Big Bill to win the AEW World Tag Team Championship. This marked Sting's first championship since his final run with the TNA World Heavyweight Championship in 2011. After winning the tag team title, Sting and Allin were attacked by The Young Bucks (now individually preferring to be called Matthew and Nicholas Jackson). The Young Bucks then became the number one contenders for the title, with Sting and Allin scheduled to defend the AEW World Tag Team Championship against them in a tornado tag team match at Revolution for Sting's retirement match.

Sting and Allin defeated The Young Bucks in Sting's final match at Revolution to retain their tag team titles. Sting won the match for his team after Matthew Jackson submitted to the Scorpion Death Lock. The Revolution event that included the match was held at the Greenboro Coliseum in Greensboro, North Carolina, where Sting had fought Flair to a 45-minute time-limit draw at Clash of the Champions I in 1988. The match featured Ricky Steamboat as guest timekeeper, and run-ins from Flair and Sting's sons Garrett and Steven Jr., who were dressed as their father's Surfer and Wolfpac personas. Several of Sting's former WCW and NWA colleagues attended the match, including Nikita Koloff, Lex Luger, Magnum T. A., and Diamond Dallas Page.

Sting retired with an undefeated record in AEW, having won all 29 matches he competed in for the promotion. As a result of Sting's retirement, the AEW World Tag Team Championship was vacated, ending he and Allin's reign at 25 days. At the post-show media scrum, Sting expressed interest in having talks about staying in AEW in a non-wrestling role but was not interested in becoming a manager or an agent.

==== Sporadic appearances (2024–present) ====
At All In on August 25, 2024, Sting made his first post-retirement appearance, where he saved Darby Allin from The Elite (Matthew Jackson, Nicholas Jackson, and Jack Perry). In October 2024, Sting announced that he had signed a new, multi-year, non-wrestling contract with AEW, giving the promotion the allowance to sell Sting merchandise, as well as allow Sting to make sporadic appearances at AEW events. Sting would continue to make several appearances for AEW: at WrestleDream on October 18, 2025, assisting Allin defeat Jon Moxley by taking out the Death Riders, at Dynamite: Spring BreakThru on April 15, 2026, to celebrate Allin winning the AEW World Championship, and on the May 6, 2026 episode of Dynamite, as part of the tribute segment to former WCW owner Ted Turner. On August 30, 2026, Sting made an appearance at All in alongside his son Steven Borden Jr.

== Legacy and influence ==
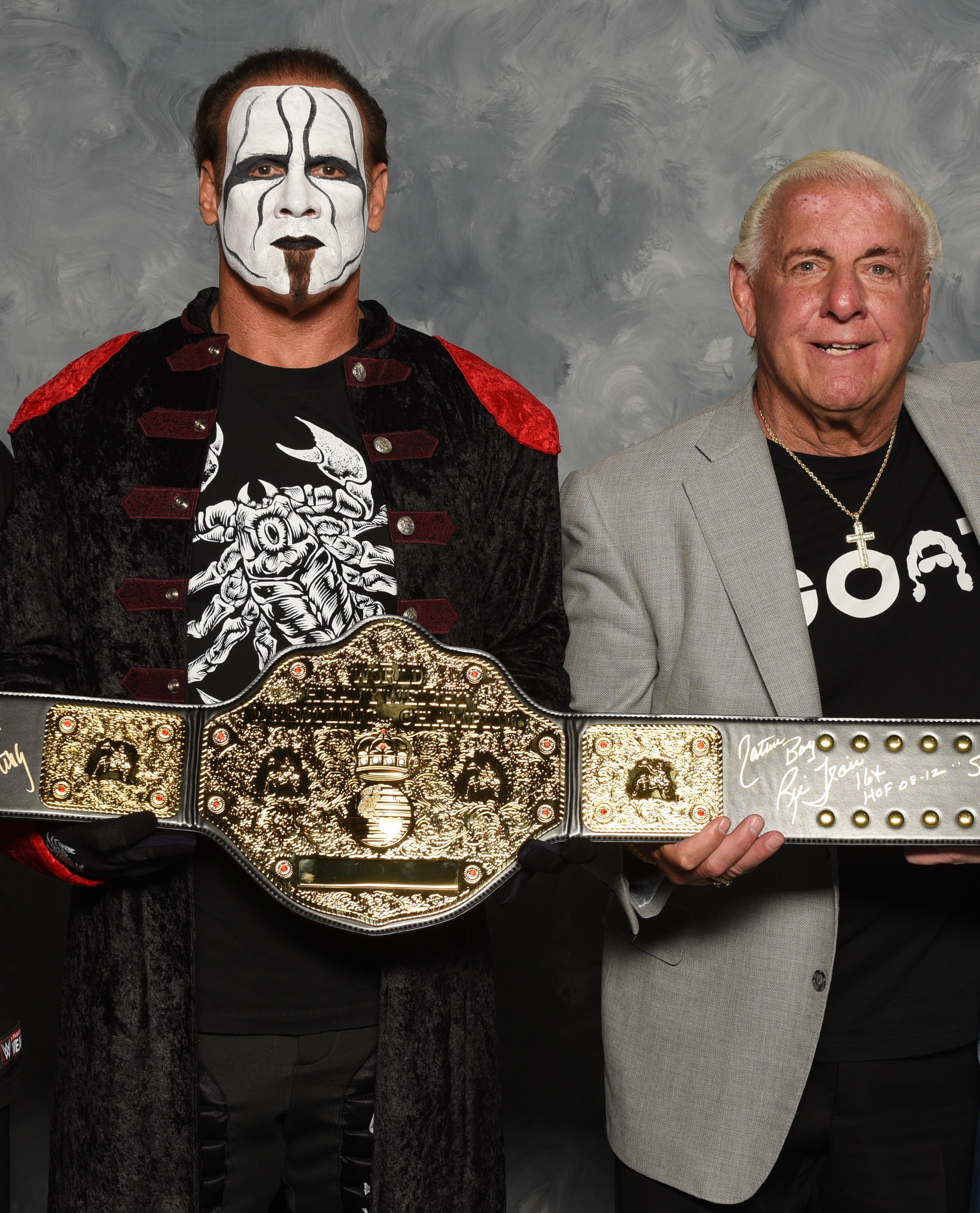
Sting with long time on-screen rival and real life friend Ric Flair

Sting is widely regarded as the greatest performer in WCW history. Former rival Hulk Hogan asserted that Sting should be mentioned in any conversation regarding the top 10 greatest pro wrestlers of all time; numerous outlets have placed him in such listings. (Note: See:) Digital Spy writer Mayer Nissim commended Sting's ability to constantly evolve his gimmick while fellow franchise players Hulk Hogan and John Cena largely failed to do so, in order to maintain spectator interest. Borden is known for his charity work, once regarding his involvement with the Make-A-Wish and Starlight Children's Foundations as his "most fulfilling activity". Prior to his signing with WWE, Sting's legacy was perpetuated by the organization. It hailed him as "one of sports-entertainment's elite", and ranked him at number one in listings of the greatest wrestlers to never perform in WWE, and the greatest stars in WCW history. In 2013, the company named Sting's WCW World Heavyweight Championship contest against Diamond Dallas Page, on April 26, 1999, as the greatest match ever aired on WCW's flagship Monday Nitro program. At Night of Champions 2013, WWE organized a viewer poll to determine the greatest United States Champion of all time: Sting, a two-time champion, beat out the other four contenders in a landslide victory with 53% of the overall vote. In regard to Sting's creative handling after he signed with WWE, PWInsider editor Dave Scherer wrote that "he really represented WCW so he was never going to get that [legend] treatment".

Sting was the inaugural inductee into the TNA Hall of Fame. TNA president Dixie Carter credits Sting with being the major wrestling superstar that TNA needed to establish itself. The company describes him as having had an "unparalleled career" and as being a legend who surpasses time.

Sting was regarded by colleagues in WCW as a professional and well-respected locker room leader. Prominent adversary Big Van Vader felt that Sting had unsurpassed athletic prowess within the business, and "ranks right up at the top" as an in-ring performer. Ric Flair called Sting his greatest opponent. Former rival Diamond Dallas Page, commenting on Sting's entry into WWE in 2014, said: "Everyone there grew up watching him... No one did it better than Sting, nobody".

John Cena mimicked Sting's hairstyle in his younger years and recalled, "he was my guy"; Seth Rollins would dress up as Sting in his youth. Tommy Dreamer told how he "wanted to be Sting"—a sentiment shared by Jeff Hardy. Cody Rhodes and Shelton Benjamin named him their favorite childhood wrestler, while Tyson Kidd professed to being "a huge Sting fan as a kid". He was also a prominent influence on industry veterans Kurt Angle, Bill Goldberg, Kane, A. J. Styles and Dustin Rhodes/Goldust. Bray Wyatt said that he "really would like to take on" Sting, adding: "I have to have [that] before I die; I don't care if it happens outside a Waffle House, somewhere."

Sting's comeback run with AEW was acclaimed by wrestling journalists, with some expressing surprise at his predilection for high-flying spots despite his age. Lauren Theisen of Defector observed, "In the two-dozen or so matches he performed in front of live fans for the company, Sting became something of a reincarnated daredevil, taking as many cues from [Darby] Allin's stuntshow fearlessness as the younger man was supposed to be taking from him." Justin Henry of Cultaholic compared Sting's work on 2021's Double or Nothing as similar to his championship match against Ric Flair at 1990's Great American Bash, in which he was also working following recovery from a serious injury. On Sting's participation in a match at 2022's Revolution, Sean Rueter of SB Nation wrote, "The man is 62 years old, and could just be living off a WWE Legends deal and autograph signings. But he's out here jumping off balconies onto Andrade El Idolo and crashing them both through three tables. I have no idea why The Man Called Sting continues to do this, but I assume it's because he loves it." Mike Piellucci of D Magazine wrote, "With everything Borden has accomplished since his return to television, the greatest is that he's escaped becoming a nostalgia act. He can deliver most of his trademark maneuvers, and his physique has held up better, longer, than arguably anyone before him. The Stinger Splash recalls Jordan's farewell tour with the Washington Wizards more than his soaring heyday with the Chicago Bulls, but it's still credible. Sting still has it." After Sting's retirement match, Rueter wrote, "A timeless, ageless wonder, Sting redefined what a final run in wrestling could look like. A career that closed with a bang, not a whimper."

=== Popularity ===
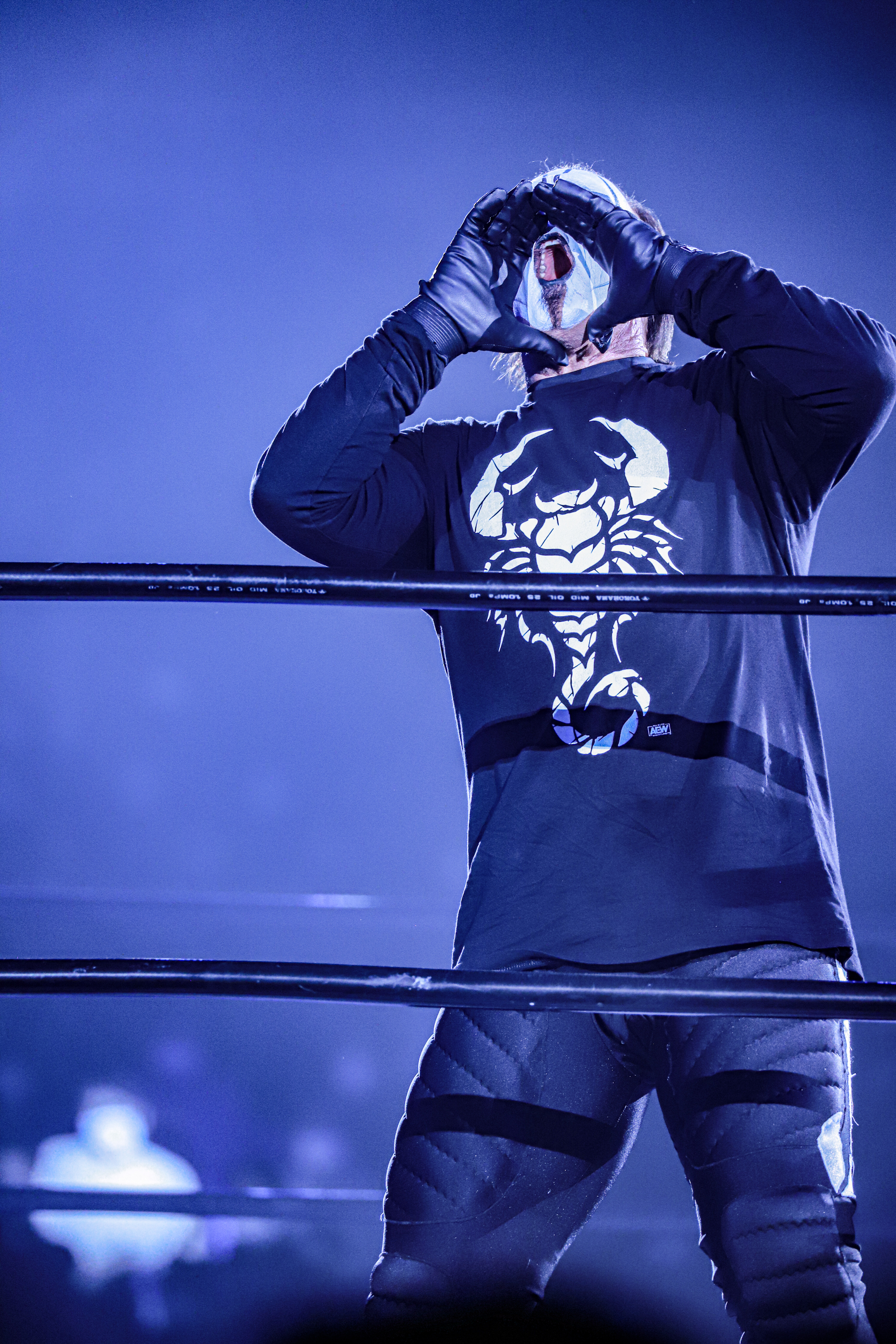
Sting performing his trademark war cry at The Great Muta Final "Bye-Bye", January 2023

Pro wrestling journalist Bill Apter wrote of Sting, "His colorful face paint, piercing war cry and signature Stinger Splash electrified fans both young and old... he boasted one of the largest and most loyal fanbases of any in-ring personality in history." A young Jeff Hardy was overwhelmed by the crowd reaction to Sting, on whom fans were "really hooked", and "reaching out to want to know, and want to support." Then-WCW colleague Ric Flair recalled, "When he flew out that door with that blonde hair and the paint, man, the chicks went crazy. The people went crazy." Former WCW and WWE announcer and current AEW announcer Jim Ross described Sting as "truly one of the great stars of the 90s in any organization". He was voted by Pro Wrestling Illustrated readers as "Most Popular Wrestler of the Year" four times (a record shared with John Cena), for the years 1991, 1992, 1994 and 1997. His young supporters were known as the "Little Stingers".

Former WCW booker Kevin Sullivan said of Sting's rivalry with Flair: "If I needed to draw a rating, Sting and Flair always drew. It was like [Muhammad] Ali and [Joe] Frazier". The Clash of the Champions I event in 1988, which aired opposite the WWF's WrestleMania IV and was headlined by Sting vs. Flair, generated a record-setting 5.6 rating on TBS. The pair also main-evented The Great American Bash 1990, which was the NWA's biggest pay-per-view success up to that point. Reflecting on Sting in the early 1990s, then-colleague Kevin Nash said: "There weren't many draws in WCW at that point, but he was one of them". Another of the company's bookers, Mike Graham, asserted that Sting was a television ratings success during the Monday Night War; he was highly profitable in 1997, being WCW's top merchandise seller (second only to the WWF's Steve Austin overall) and, versus Hollywood Hogan, headlining the biggest-grossing pay-per-view event in the company's history at Starrcade 1997. Sting went on to join the nWo Wolfpac stable, which dominated WCW's merchandise sales at events in mid 1998. Discussing Sting's entry into WWE in 2014, Kevin Nash said that he is "so valuable to the company as a trademark". On December 3, 2020, Pro Wrestling Tees owner Ryan Barkan stated that Sting's AEW t-shirt quickly broke the single day record for t-shirt sales.

On the other hand, Pro Wrestling Torch editor Wade Keller wrote that Sting was a "valuable player during Nitro's peak years", but not a "consistent draw for WCW". Keller said Sting coasted on "natural charisma and athletic ability", but also chided WCW, where Sting observed "incompetence and political decision-making", and "was never challenged to be better than he was because he didn't have much competition". Fin Martin of Power Slam also felt that Sting's box office successes in WCW were sporadic. Martin said Sting "did not grow into the [NWA] champion's role", but allowed that his prospects as franchise player were damaged by the "story lines and booking techniques" and the "list of contenders". Wrestling journalist Dave Meltzer claimed that Sting was not a formidable draw, although this assertion was disputed by Sting's former WCW colleague Steve Austin. Dave Scherer of PWInsider wrote that Sting "didn't draw huge", but is nevertheless an "all-time great".

Sting's AEW tag team partner Darby Allin said that Sting had transcended wrestling and had become part of popular culture; Allin remarked, "You may not know any of the stuff he's done, but you can see the face paint, and people will go, 'Yo, that's that wrestler guy.'" AEW founder and booker Tony Khan, a fan of Sting since the 1980s, called him a "real-life superhero."

=== Resistance to signing with WWE ===
Prior to his signing with WWE in 2014, Sting was widely considered the greatest wrestler never to perform for the company, although he had "really good conversations" with the promotion during his career. His loyalty to WCW, even in its dying days, has been noted. That organization was purchased by the WWF (now WWE) in 2001, and Sting's contract with its parent company AOL Time Warner expired in 2002, but he still refused to make the jump, alternately attributing this to the WWF's creative usage of former WCW talents and negative dealings with their attorneys. The company's onerous live schedule and the content of its programming were also factors. Sting has, however, downplayed rumors of a difficult relationship with WWE.

Rather than sign with the WWF in 2002, Sting performed for smaller promotions, becoming the centerpiece of TNA by the mid-2000s. His pre-WWE career included "dream" matches against former WWF stars Hulk Hogan and Bret Hart in WCW, as well as bouts opposite names such as Ric Flair, Randy Savage, Kurt Angle and Mick Foley. Sting often wrestled Steve Austin in WCW; he had positive negotiations with WWE in 2003, with his proposed debut angle being a confrontation with Austin at the conclusion of WrestleMania XIX.

He was also "very, very close" to making a deal with the company in 2011, which would potentially have involved a match against The Undertaker at WrestleMania XXVII. In early 2011, during a period where Sting had not re-signed with TNA, WWE teased a mystery wrestler to appear on Monday Night Raw on February 21, 2011, with vignettes labelled "2.21.11". This led to speculation that Sting had signed with WWE. Since this Raw was billed as the "Return of the Undertaker", it was believed that this was building a Sting vs. Undertaker match at WrestleMania XXVII. Although Sting wrestled Mark Calaway in his pre-Undertaker character, "Mean" Mark Callous, at untelevised WCW live events in 1990, WWE viewers clamored for a televised Sting vs. Undertaker match. Ultimately, Sting re-signed with TNA, and on the February 21, 2011 Raw, the Undertaker returned to begin a feud with Triple H. TNA then began airing similar vignettes labelled "3.3.11", building to Sting's real return on the March 3, 2011 episode of Impact!.

== Other media ==
Borden appeared in the music video for the song "Fire in the Hole" by Lȧȧz Rockit in 1989. He made his acting debut in the action-adventure show Super Force as an assassin. He starred in a pay-per-view only film titled The Real Reason (Men Commit Crimes) (1998). Borden was featured in a Sprite commercial in 1999. He also appeared in four episodes of the Hulk Hogan action-adventure series Thunder in Paradise as Adam "Hammerhead" McCall. Borden made a guest appearance on Walker, Texas Ranger as biker and drug dealer Grangus in the episode "Unsafe Speed". He also appeared in Ready to Rumble (2000) as Sting. In 2001, Sting appeared on an episode of R.L. Stine's show, "The Nightmare Room" in the episode titled "Tangled Web". He also appeared in the Christian film, The Encounter (2011) and was featured as the lead actor in the TV movie Shutterspeed (2000). He makes a cameo appearance as Sting on an episode of Upright Citizens Brigade. Borden played an outlaw biker in the film Revelation Road (2013). In 2017 he along with multiple other wrestlers made an appearance on the hidden camera show Walk the Prank.

His autobiography, Sting: Moment Of Truth, was released on December 1, 2004. In October 2015, WWE released a second Sting DVD titled Sting: Into the Light. The three-disc set features a behind-the-scenes documentary with Sting himself as he prepares to step into a WWE ring for the first time ever at WrestleMania 31.

=== Filmography ===
Television
Year	Title	Role	Note
1991-1992	Super Force	Hallor	3 episodes
1994	Thunder in Paradise	Adam McCall	4 episodes
1999	The Show of the Archiles	Sting	1 episode
2001	Walker Texas Ranger	Gangus	1 episode
2001	The Nightmare Room	Himself/Sting	1 episode
2017	Walk the Prank	Sting	1 episode

Film
Year	Title	Role	Note
1997	Liar Liar	Wrestler	Uncredited
1998	The Real Reason (men commit crimes)	Sparkie	
2000	Shutterspeed	Riley Davis	TV Movie
2000	Ready to Rumble	Sting	
2009	Everyday Life	AL	
2010	The Encounter	Nick	
2013	Revelation Road	Junkyard	
2013	Revelation Road: 2	Junkyard	

=== Video game appearances ===
Year	Title	Notes
1989	WCW: World Championship Wrestling	
1994	WCW Main Event	Cover athlete
1994	WCW SuperBrawl Wrestling	Cover athlete
1996	WCW vs. the World	Cover athlete
1997	Fire Pro Wrestling S: 6 Men Scramble	
1997	WCW vs. nWo: World Tour	
1997	Virtual Pro Wrestling 64	
1998	WCW Nitro	Cover athlete
1998	WCW/nWo Revenge	
1999	WCW/nWo Thunder	
1999	WCW Mayhem	
2000	WCW Backstage Assault	
2008	TNA Impact!	Cover athlete
2010	TNA Impact: Cross the Line	
2014	WWE SuperCard	
2014	WWE 2K15	Pre-Order bonus
2015	WWE Immortals	Mobile Game
2015	WWE 2K16	
2016	WWE 2K17	
2017	WWE Champions	Mobile Game
2017	WWE 2K18	
2018	WWE 2K19	
2019	WWE 2K20	
2020	WWE 2K Battlegrounds	
2023	AEW Fight Forever	Cover Athlete

== Personal life ==
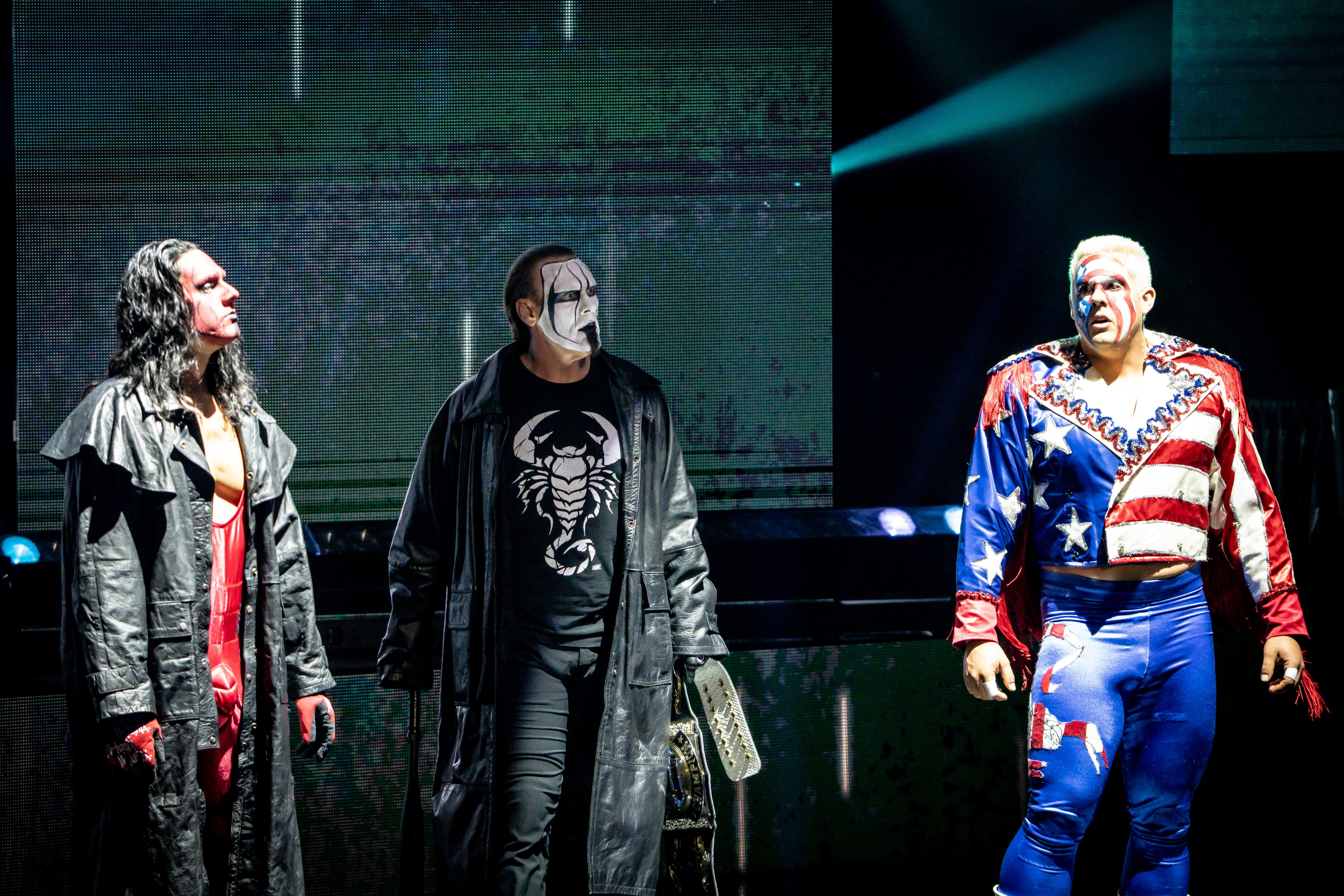
During his entrance for his final match in March 2024, Sting was accompanied by his two sons, Garrett and Steven. Garrett (right) portrayed the "Surfer Sting" era of his father's career, while Steven portrayed Sting's time in the nWo Wolfpac.

Borden was previously married to Sue Borden in 1986. They have two sons, Garrett Lee and Steven Jr. and a daughter named Gracie, who was born in 2000. Borden and Sue divorced in 2010 after 24 years of marriage. Borden married his second wife Sabine in 2015. In 2024, Steven had begun training to become a professional wrestler under Borden's final tag team partner and close friend Darby Allin, along with additional training from Adam "Edge" Copeland, Fred Rosser, and FTR (Cash Wheeler and Dax Harwood). Steven made his in-ring debut in 2025. Garrett would make his in-ring debut in 2026.

Borden was an admitted anabolic steroid user in the 1980s. He became a born-again Christian in August 1998 after confessing his adultery, and substance and alcohol abuse to his then-wife. His elder son Garrett attended Azusa Pacific University, where he played college football as a running back. Steven Jr. attended Kilgore College, where he played tight end; on December 19, 2012, he committed to attend the University of Kentucky. After the 2015 NFL draft, Steven Jr. was invited by the Kansas City Chiefs to try out for the team at their rookie mini-camp, but did not receive a contract offer.

Borden met the other famous performer called Sting, English musician Gordon "Sting" Sumner, in the early 1990s at one of the musician's concerts in Atlanta. Sumner called Borden wanting to meet him after the former saw his then-nine-year-old son's posters of the wrestler in his bedroom, to which Borden enthusiastically accepted.

In 1989, Borden and his longtime friend and fellow professional wrestler Lex Luger opened a gym, Main Event Fitness in Atlanta, Georgia.

== Championships and accomplishments ==
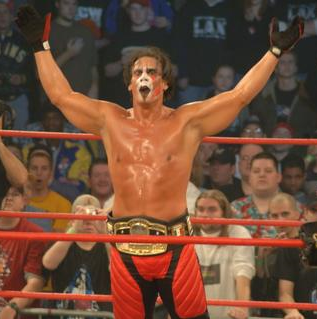
A two-time NWA World Heavyweight Champion, Sting had one reign each in WCW and TNA.

Sting with the Big Gold Belt, which represented five of his six WCW World Heavyweight Championship reigns and both of his WCW International World Heavyweight Championship reigns.

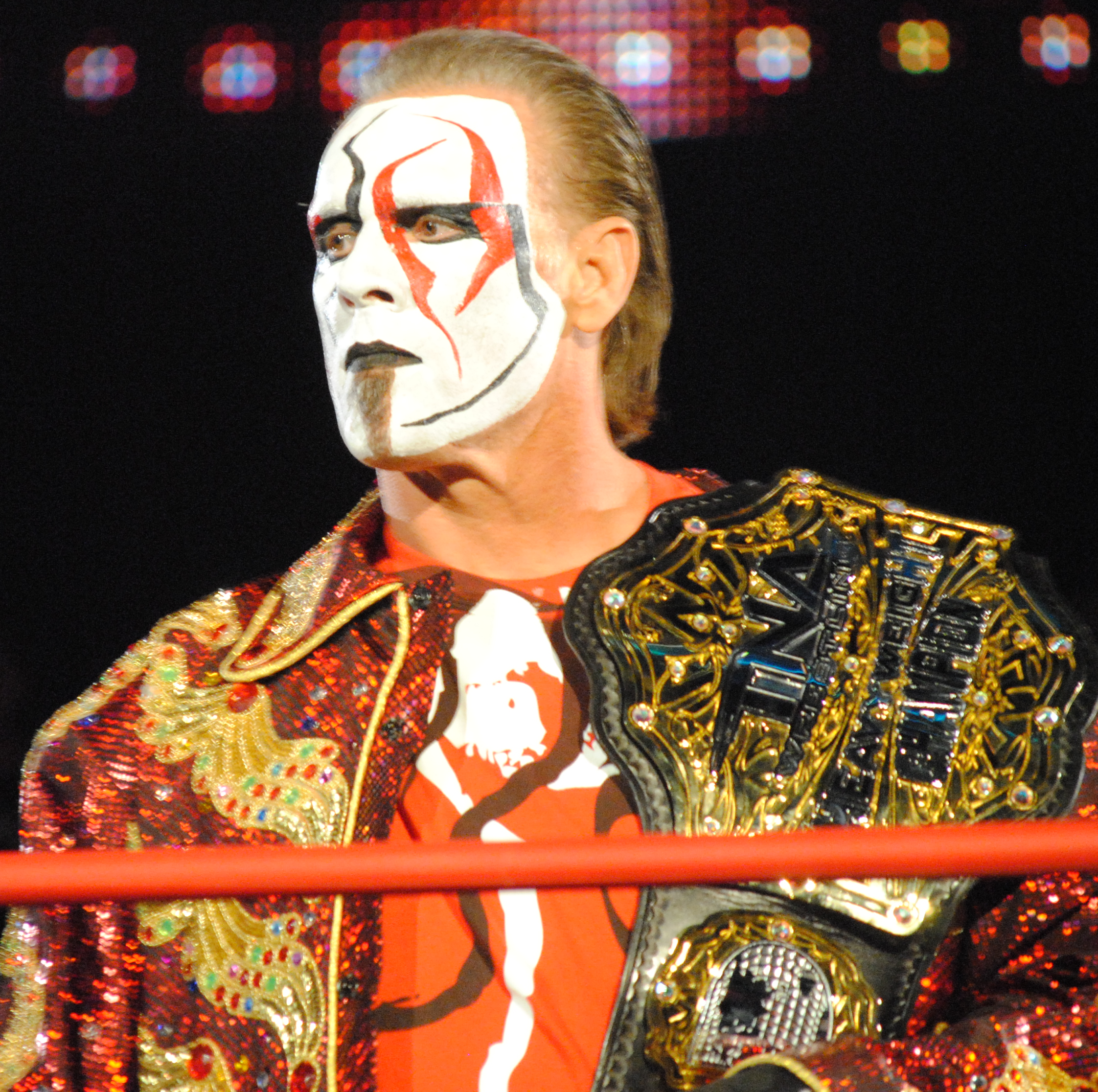
Sting's total of four reigns as TNA World Heavyweight Champion is tied for the second most all time.

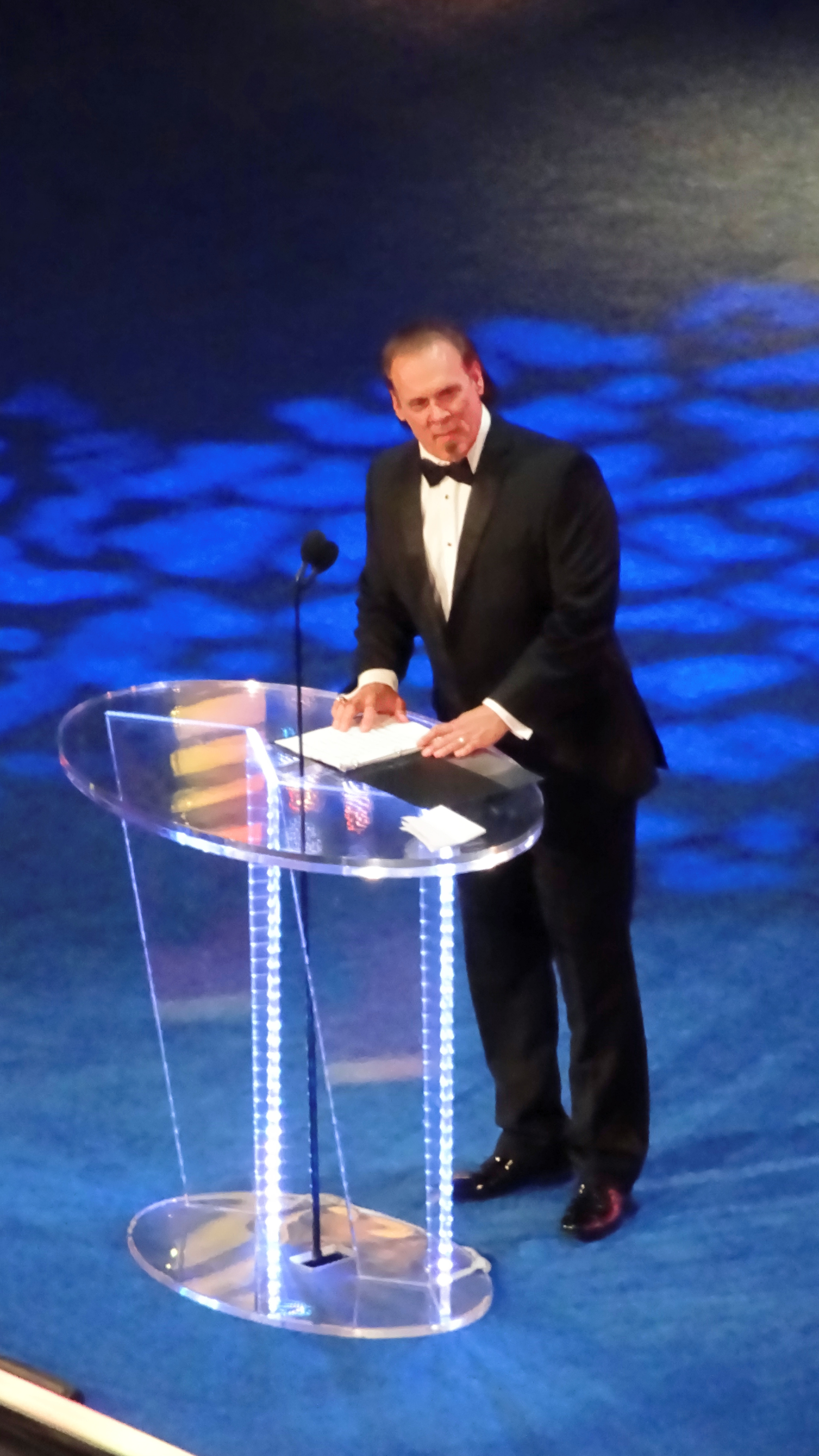
Sting was inducted into the WWE Hall of Fame in 2016.

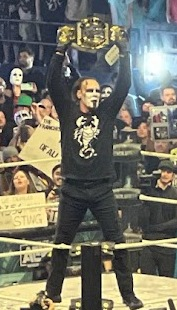
Sting's final championship reign was with the AEW World Tag Team Championship in 2024.

- All Elite Wrestling
  - AEW World Tag Team Championship (1 time) – with Darby Allin
  - AEW Dynamite Award (1 time)
    - "Biggest Surprise" (2021) – Debuting during the special "Winter Is Coming" episode of Dynamite on December 2, 2020
- Cauliflower Alley Club
  - Iron Mike Mazurki Award (2024)
- Jim Crockett Promotions / World Championship Wrestling
  - NWA World Heavyweight Championship (1 time)^{1}
  - WCW World Heavyweight Championship (6 times)
  - WCW International World Heavyweight Championship (2 times)
  - WCW United States Heavyweight Championship (2 times)
  - NWA World Television Championship (1 time)
  - WCW World Tag Team Championship (3 times) – with Lex Luger (1), The Giant (1), and Kevin Nash (1)
  - Battlebowl Battle Royal (1991)
  - European Cup (1994, 2000)
  - Iron Man Tournament (1989)
  - Jim Crockett, Sr. Memorial Cup (1988) – with Lex Luger
  - King of Cable Tournament (1992)
  - London Lethal Lottery Tag Team Tournament (2000) – with Scott Steiner
  - WCW United States Championship Tournament (1991)
  - WCW United States Championship Tournament (1995)
  - World Cup of Wrestling (1995) – with Randy Savage, Lex Luger, Johnny B. Badd, Eddie Guerrero, Chris Benoit, and Alex Wright
  - Third WCW Triple Crown Champion
- Nebraska Pro Wrestling Hall of Fame
  - Class of 2019
- NWA: Total Nonstop Action / Total Nonstop Action Wrestling
  - NWA World Heavyweight Championship (1 time)^{2}
  - TNA World Heavyweight Championship (4 times)
  - TNA World Tag Team Championship (1 time) – with Kurt Angle
  - TNA World Heavyweight Championship Tournament (First Bracket, 2009)
  - TNA Hall of Fame (2012)
  - TNA Year End Awards (3 times)
    - Most Inspirational Wrestler of the Year (2007)
    - Match of the Year (2007) vs. Kurt Angle at Bound for Glory, October 14, 2007
    - Match of the Year (2009) vs. A.J. Styles at Bound for Glory, October 18, 2009
- Pro Wrestling Illustrated
  - Comeback of the Year (2006, 2011, 2014)
  - Match of the Year (1991) with Lex Luger vs. the Steiner Brothers at SuperBrawl I
  - Most Improved Wrestler of the Year (1988)
  - Most Inspirational Wrestler of the Year (1990)
  - Most Popular Wrestler of the Year (1991, 1992, 1994, 1997)
  - Wrestler of the Year (1990)
  - Stanley Weston Award for Lifetime Achievement (2023)
  - Ranked No. 1 of the top 500 singles wrestlers in the PWI 500 in 1992
  - Ranked No. 15 of the top 500 singles wrestlers of the PWI Years in 2003
  - Ranked No. 52 of the top 100 tag teams of the PWI Years with Lex Luger in 2003
- Professional Wrestling Hall of Fame
  - Class of 2018
- Universal Wrestling Federation
  - UWF World Tag Team Championship (3 times) – with Eddie Gilbert (2) and Rick Steiner (1)
- World Wrestling All-Stars
  - WWA World Heavyweight Championship (1 time)
- Wrestling Observer Newsletter
  - Match of the Year (1988) vs. Ric Flair at Clash of the Champions I
  - Most Charismatic (1988, 1992)
  - Most Improved (1988)
  - Most Unimproved (1990)
  - Best Babyface (1992)
  - Worst Worked Match of the Year (1995) vs. Tony Palmore at Battle 7
  - Worst Worked Match of the Year (2011) vs. Jeff Hardy at Victory Road
  - Wrestling Observer Newsletter Hall of Fame (Class of 2016)
- WWE
  - WWE Hall of Fame (Class of 2016)
  - Slammy Award (2 times)
    - "This is Awesome" Moment of the Year (2014) – Debuting to help Team Cena defeat Team Authority at Survivor Series
    - "Surprise Return of the Year" (2015) – as Seth Rollins' statue, and attacks Rollins on Raw

^{1} Won while the NWA World Heavyweight Championship was defended in World Championship Wrestling when WCW was part of the National Wrestling Alliance. The same goes for any other NWA championship or honor won after November 1988.

^{2} Won while TNA obtained the sole rights to use the NWA World Heavyweight Championship through an agreement with the NWA.

== See also ==
- Sting and Lex Luger
- The Blade Runners
- The Four Horsemen
- The Main Event Mafia
- The Varsity Club
