= Designated player =

A designated player may refer to:

- Designated Player Rule, a Major League Soccer rule for players over the salary cap
- Designated player (NBA), a National Basketball Association exemption for contract extensions
- Designated player (softball), a softball batter

See also

- Designated hitter
- Franchise player
