= Franchise player =

Sports player a brand is built around

In professional sports, a franchise player is an athlete who is both the best player on their team and one that the team can build their "franchise" around for the foreseeable future.

== Overview ==
In the United States, outstanding players were referred to as "franchises" at least as far back as the 1950s. By the 1970s, the concept of a "franchise" player who single-handedly generates success was commonly understood in the sporting trade. The term franchise player was in widespread use by the early 1980s to describe both star rookies like John Elway and Kelvin Bryant and veterans like George Brett. While the term is primarily associated with North American sports, it is sometimes used in reference to athletes in sports outside the United States, such as rugby league.

== Untouchable ==
In other sports, such as association football and esports, the similar term "untouchable" is sometimes used to describe players who are considered unavailable for transfer or trade, either because their organization is unwilling to part with them or because the players themselves reject offers to leave. Examples include Jude Bellingham at Real Madrid, and Lee Sang-hyeok (Faker) at T1, the latter of whom famously rejected a blank check offer to play for a North American team.

== See also ==
- Designated player (disambiguation)
- Franchise tag
