= Homicide (wrestler) =

American professional wrestler (born 1977)

- Homicide in 2020

Personal information
- Born: Nelson Erazo; March 20, 1977 (age 49) Brooklyn, New York, U.S.
- Children: 2

Professional wrestling career
- Ring name(s): Homicide; The Latin Terror
- Billed height: 5 ft 10 in (178 cm)
- Billed weight: 220 lb (100 kg)
- Billed from: "Bed–Stuy Do-or-Die", Brooklyn, New York; Brooklyn, New York
- Trained by: Manny Fernandez
- Debut: March 5, 1994
- Retired: March 20, 2025

Nelson Erazo (born March 20, 1977) better known by the ring name Homicide, is an American retired professional wrestler best known for his tenures in Total Nonstop Action Wrestling (TNA) and Ring of Honor (ROH), including stints as part of the Latin American Xchange stable with Hernandez.

Homicide began his career in 1994, working for several independent promotions, most notably Jersey All Pro Wrestling. During the 2000s, he began working for ROH and TNA, holding championships including the ROH World Championship, ROH World Tag Team Championship, NWA World Tag Team Championship, TNA World Tag Team Championship, and TNA X Division Championship. He retired in 2025.

== Professional wrestling career ==
=== Early career (1994–1997) ===
A native of Brooklyn, Erazo was a wrestling fan from the age of five and decided that he wanted to become a wrestler at the age of fifteen. After amassing a series of athletic qualifications including American football and amateur wrestling, he was offered an athletic scholarship to the University of Miami, which he rejected, preferring to pursue "fast money". Erazo trained himself as a wrestler in a bodega, debuting on March 5, 1994. After wrestling for three years without any formal training, Erazo attended a professional wrestling school in New Jersey operated by Manny Fernandez.

Erazo worked on the independent circuit throughout the 1990s. In 1997, Erazo was part of faction called The Wrecking Crew in Bobby Lombardi's Long Island Wrestling Federation (LIWF). Then while on a year-long hiatus from wrestling, he operated a training school in Cypress Hills, Brooklyn known as "The Doghouse" along with Laithon and Lowlife Louie. The Doghouse produced approximately 22 graduates, including a number of ROH wrestlers, such as Low Ki. Erazo also formed a tag team called the Natural Born Sinners with Boogalou (which saw Boogalou wear a Leatherface mask and Homicide wear a Michael Myers mask).

=== Jersey All Pro Wrestling (1997–2012) ===
==== Nation of Immigration (1997–1999) ====
Homicide joined Jersey All Pro Wrestling on September 7, 1997, and quickly became a mainstay of the promotion. He formed a tag team with Kane D known as Nation of Immigration (N.O.I.), and on March 22, 1998, The N.O.I. defeated The Sickness and The Blood Angels in a three-way tag match for the JAPW Tag Team Championship in Newark, New Jersey. They lost the title to The Skin Head Express on May 20, but regained them on August 25, defeating Russ and Charlie Haas in a weapons match. Their second reign lasted until January 29, when they lost to D-Sex. Homicide would later hold the title twice more, with Don Montoya and with B-Boy.

==== Heavyweight Champion (1999–2005) ====
Homicide won the JAPW Heavyweight Championship for the first time on July 9, 1999, by defeating Don Montoya in Bayonne, New Jersey. He lost the title to Chino Martinez on August 29. His second reign began when the champion, Jason, vacated the title on November 18, 2000, by no-showing the event. Homicide defeated Jay Lover for the vacant title that same night in the ECW Arena in Philadelphia. He lost the title to one of his students, Low Ki, on July 7, 2001. Three more Heavyweight Championship reigns followed in 2001 and 2002, with Homicide firmly establishing himself as a dominant player in JAPW. Homicide's increasing commitments, including tours of Japan with Big Japan Pro Wrestling and Pro Wrestling Zero1, led to a decline in his involvement in JAPW after late-2002.

Dan Maff, another student of Homicide's, won the JAPW Heavyweight Championship on December 13, 2003. He held the title throughout 2004. In March 2005, however, Homicide and Maff had a legitimate falling-out, with Homicide announcing that Maff had betrayed him, and that he would refuse to work for any promotion which employed Maff. This effectively led to Maff being blacklisted from the professional wrestling indy circuit. As a result, the JAPW Heavyweight Championship was vacated. Jay Lethal had pursued the JAPW Heavyweight Championship for several months and was widely expected to be the next champion. The title was put on the line in a match between Lethal and an undisclosed opponent on March 26, 2005. The opponent was revealed to be the returning Homicide, who defeated Lethal for an unparalleled sixth JAPW Heavyweight Championship. His reign lasted until May 21, when Lethal finally won the belt in a four-way match. The following week, Homicide announced that he was temporarily leaving JAPW, but promised to go on a "murdering spree" and become a seven-time JAPW Heavyweight Champion when he returned.

==== Tag Team Champion (2005–2012) ====
Homicide at a JAPW show in 2008

On October 22, 2005, Homicide teamed with his long-term nemesis Teddy Hart to defeat the Backseat Boyz for the JAPW Tag Team Championship. Their reign lasted until November 12 of that year, when Kashmere and Acid regained the title. On June 9, 2007, Homicide and his Latin American Xchange partner Hernandez defeated Jay Lethal and Azrieal to win the JAPW Tag Team titles, which they would hold for over a year before dropping them to the Full Blooded Italians (Little Guido and Tracy Smothers) on November 15, 2008.

On October 27, 2007, Homicide made good on his word when he defeated Low Ki to win the JAPW Heavyweight Title for a record–setting seventh time. He would, however, lose the title back to Low Ki that same night when Teddy Hart attacked him during a tag team match between LAX and BLKOUT, where both the Heavyweight and the Tag Team titles were on the line.

On May 22, 2010, Homicide wrestled one of his biggest matches in JAPW, defeating Japanese legend Jushin Thunder Liger in the main event of the show.

Homicide returned to JAPW on April 14, 2012, when he and Eddie Kingston defeated Philly's Most Wanted (Blk Jeez and Joker) to win the vacant JAPW Tag Team Championship.

=== Ring of Honor (2002–2008) ===
==== Feud with Steve Corino (2002–2003) ====
Homicide at an ROH event

Homicide's first main independent exposure came in 2002 when he was recruited by the upstart Ring of Honor (ROH) promotion. He and Boogalou wrestled on the first ever ROH show, The Era of Honor Begins, on February 23, and were defeated by the Boogie Knights, by way of DQ. The Natural Born Sinners were a dominant tag team in ROH, beating The Carnage Crew at the July 27 Crowning a Champion event, and also won at the August 24 Honor Invades Boston event, defeating Tony Mamaluke and James Maritato.

After Boogalou suffered an injury and then jumped ship to Rob Black's Xtreme Pro Wrestling promotion, Homicide appeared alone at Glory by Honor. Responding to a challenge from The Backseat Boyz, he invited anyone in the locker room to be his partner. Steve Corino responded to his offer, and Corino and Homicide faced the Backseat Boys later that night. In the course of the match, Corino turned on Homicide after Homicide accidentally hit him, superkicking his partner and leaving the ring, enabling the Backseat Boyz to easily defeat Homicide.

Homicide and Corino would begin a four-year rivalry, with Corino criticizing Homicide's lifestyle and somewhat checkered past. The feud culminated in a match at the One Year Anniversary Show on February 8, 2003, in Queens, New York. Homicide was the hometown favorite, but lost to Corino following interference from The Group, Corino's entourage. After the match, Corino applied a cobra sleeper to Homicide, instigating a worked riot.

After regaining some momentum by defeating Christopher Daniels on the April 12 ROH event, The Epic Encounter, Homicide defeated CM Punk in a match for the number one contendership on April 26 at Retribution: Round Robin Challenge II. Homicide faced ROH World Champion Samoa Joe on May 31 at Do or Die, hoping not only to win the title, but to gain revenge on Joe for helping Corino defeat him in his hometown. Despite the support of his manager, Julius Smokes, and his close friend and former student, Low Ki, Homicide lost to Joe, after getting distracted by Smokes and Ki arguing outside the ring.

Homicide was undefeated in ROH throughout June and July, and on August 16, 2003, at Bitter Friends, Stiffer Enemies he defeated Corino in a rematch of their February encounter. After twenty minutes of fighting which saw both men bleeding and carrying injuries, Homicide trapped Corino in a modified STF, prompting Corino's corner man, Guillotine LaGrande, to throw in the towel, awarding the match to Homicide. In the course of the match, Corino suffered a legitimate ruptured eardrum, and permanently lost most of the hearing in his left ear following a stiff slap to the side of the head from Homicide. Following high-profile victories over Samoa Joe and B. J. Whitmer, Homicide faced Corino for a third time on November 29, 2003, at War of the Wire in a barbed wire match. This time Julius Smokes threw in the towel for Homicide after Corino throttled him with a length of barbed wire. Corino offered Homicide a handshake after the match, indicating that he finally respected Homicide, but Homicide refused to shake his hand.

==== The Rottweilers (2004) ====
Homicide faced A.J. Styles at The Battle Lines Are Drawn on January 10, 2004. After Styles was thrown from the ring, Homicide dove over the top rope in pursuit and landed in the third row of the audience, briefly knocking himself unconscious and injuring his shoulder and ribs. Styles quickly capitalized on Homicide's vulnerabilities, defeating him following a Styles Clash. After defeating CM Punk at The Last Stand, Homicide took a hiatus from Ring of Honor to "find himself", sending word through Julius Smokes that when he returned, he wanted a shot at Samoa Joe and the ROH Heavyweight Championship.

Homicide challenged Samoa Joe for the ROH World Championship once more at Reborn: Stage 1 on April 23. Homicide showed signs of anger and frustration throughout the match, and after he scored what appeared to be a three count with a roll-up, but what the referee of the match ruled only a two count, he turned into a villainous character by knocking him out. As the recovered Joe went to attack Homicide, the lights in the arena went out and in the darkness Homicide threw a fireball at Joe, which led to him getting disqualified in the match. After the match, Homicide attacked referees and wrestlers who came to the ring to aid the badly burned Joe, before being apprehended by the rest of the locker room. In subsequent weeks, Homicide defeated fan favorites Bryan Danielson and Spanky, cheating and threatening referees in both matches. Homicide faced Joe for the ROH Heavyweight Championship for a third time on May 22 at Generation Next, with Joe retaining in a match which saw him bleed for the first time in ROH. Homicide and Joe continued to feud throughout the summer of 2004, with Homicide recruiting a stable known as The Rottweilers (originally Low Ki, Ricky Reyes, Rocky Romero and Julius Smokes) to help him defeat Joe. Despite the best efforts of The Rottweilers, Joe defeated Homicide to retain his title in a fourth match on July 23 at Death Before Dishonor II: Night 1. The Rottweilers worked as a unit throughout the remainder of 2004, helping one another win matches.

==== Best of Five Series and feud with Jay Lethal (2005) ====
In January 2005, Homicide began a "best of five" series with American Dragon. Homicide was victorious in the first two matches, a submission match and a taped fist match, but lost the remaining three matches – a falls count anywhere match, a lumberjack match and a steel cage match at The Final Showdown on May 13, 2005.

Following his loss to American Dragon, Homicide and the Rottweilers began a feud with Jay Lethal. On May 7 at Manhattan Mayhem, Homicide and Low Ki teamed together to defeat Lethal and Samoa Joe. Lethal was stretchered from the arena wearing a neck brace, apparently badly injured. With Lethal injured, Homicide turned his attentions to James Gibson, whom he defeated on June 12 at The Future Is Now. After the match, The Rottweilers continued to attack Gibson until Lethal made his return and saved Gibson. This led to a match between Lethal and Homicide on July 9 at Escape from New York, which Homicide won. On July 23 at The Homecoming, Homicide and two fellow Rottweilers (Low Ki and Ricky Reyes) defeated Samoa Joe, James Gibson and Jay Lethal in a six-man tag match. Low Ki fought Lethal to a no contest on August 12 at Redemption, after Homicide came to ringside after the match to attack Lethal. His plan was foiled by Matt Hardy, who intercepted Homicide and then defeated him in a scheduled singles bout. On August 13 at Punk: The Final Chapter, Lethal and Samoa Joe defeated Homicide and Low Ki by disqualification after Homicide elbow-dropped the referee. From that point on, Lethal began feuding primarily with Low Ki.

==== Feud with Colt Cabana (2005–2006) ====
At Unforgettable on October 2 in Philadelphia, Pennsylvania, Homicide teamed with Japanese wrestler Kenta Kobashi to defeat Samoa Joe and his stablemate Low Ki. Homicide teamed with Low Ki on October 14 at Enter the Dragon in a match that saw him lose to Cabana and his old rival Steve Corino, newly returned to the promotion. He faced Cabana in a singles match at Vendetta on November 5 that ended in a no contest. On November 19 at A Night of Tribute, Homicide faced Cabana once again in a no disqualification rematch. Following interference from Julius Smokes and Grim Reefer, Homicide forced Cabana to submit by strangling him with a coat hanger.

On December 3 in New York City at Steel Cage Warfare, Homicide lost to Corino in a rematch from their feud of 2003. During the match, Homicide separated his shoulder, but opted not to have surgery. As a result of his injury, Homicide was unable to compete at the following show, Final Battle 2005. He did show up, however, but with the intent on killing Steve Corino. Following Corino's match, Homicide ran down to the ring and attacked him. Colt Cabana ran down to the ring to save Corino, only to have Homicide pour Drano down his throat.

On January 14, at ROH's Hell Freezes Over Homicide lost the Full Impact Pro Heavyweight Championship to Bryan Danielson in a three-way match which also included Roderick Strong, ending his reign of over 15 months. On February 25 at the Fourth Anniversary Show, Homicide defeated Cabana in a "Ghetto Fight". Homicide went on to defeat Cabana once again on March 31. On April 1, in a Chicago Street Fight, Cabana finally defeated Homicide. Following the match, Homicide and Cabana embraced, with Cabana having won Homicide's respect.

==== Ring of Homicide (2006) ====
Throughout mid-2006, Homicide resisted Combat Zone Wrestling's (CZW) invasion of Ring of Honor until May 13, 2006, when he defeated Necro Butcher after a wild brawl in Edison, New Jersey, which involved over 600 chairs being thrown into the ring by the fans. He also challenged Bryan Danielson for the ROH World Championship on June 3, but lost due to referee stoppage, prompting Homicide to attack referee Todd Sinclair. After defeating Chris Hero, the leader of the CZW invasion, on June 17, Homicide said he would quit Ring of Honor if he did not win the ROH World Championship by the end of the year. His frustration with Ring of Honor grew when he was counted-out during an ROH Pure Championship bout with Nigel McGuinness on June 24. On July 15, Homicide took part in a five-on-five Cage of Death match pitting members of the Ring of Honor roster against members of the CZW roster, winning the bout for his team by pinning Nate Webb. Following the match, Homicide told Ring of Honor commissioner Jim Cornette that he wished to be rewarded with a shot at the ROH World Championship, a match with Steve Corino and the re-instatement of Low Ki, who Cornette had suspended several months earlier. After Cornette granted the first two "wishes" but refused to bring back Low Ki, Homicide spat in his face, prompting Cornette and his bodyguard, Adam Pearce, to beat Homicide down. A match was scheduled for August 5 between Homicide and Pearce, which eventually turned into a tag team match involving Homicide, B. J. Whitmer, Steve Corino and Adam Pearce.

Homicide then began teaming with Samoa Joe against the Briscoes. His feud with Jim Cornette came to an abrupt end, when Cornette left Ring of Honor on November 4, 2006. On November 25, Homicide and Samoa Joe beat the Briscoes in a Street Fight, thus ending their feud.

Homicide then focused on facing Bryan Danielson for the ROH World Championship at Final Battle 2006. He stated that if he did not win the ROH World Title at Final Battle, he would leave ROH. On December 23, Homicide defeated Bryan Danielson in 29:12 to win the ROH title. Adam Pearce and Shane Hagadorn attacked Homicide at one point and it was stopped, but the ref refused to end it on a DQ. At another point, Danielson would not break on the ropes and again the ref refused to call a DQ. Danielson even managed to get his hand on the rope after a Cop Killa. Homicide finally won with a lariat.

==== World Champion; departure (2007) ====
Homicide defended successfully against Chris Hero and Samoa Joe on January 26 and 27, 2007. Homicide then successfully defended the championship against Jimmy Rave on February 16 in the same building where he won the belt, the Manhattan Center in New York City. The next evening, however, in Philadelphia at the Pennsylvania National Guard Armory, Homicide was defeated for the ROH World Championship by Takeshi Morishima, a Japanese professional wrestler visiting the United States. The two would compete against each other again at Fifth Year Festival: Chicago, when Homicide teamed with Samoa Joe to face Morishima and Nigel McGuinness.

On March 30, 2007, Homicide won a match against Christopher Daniels at All Star Extravaganza 3. After the match, Jim Cornette returned alongside Adam Pearce and Shane Hagadorn and they delivered a beating to Homicide until Colt Cabana and Delirious made the save. The next night, Homicide in a surprise match teamed with Colt Cabana for the first time to defeat Brent Albright and Adam Pearce at Supercard of Honor 2.

On May 2, 2007, Ring of Honor announced on their website that they had signed a Pay-per-view deal with G-Funk Sports & Entertainment. Following the announcement, Total Nonstop Action Wrestling pulled Homicide and Austin Aries, both under contracts with TNA, from all Ring of Honor shows. Homicide competed in what was to become his final match at Good Times, Great Memories held on April 28, a Four Corners Survival match against Brent Albright, B. J. Whitmer and Jimmy Rave. At Respect is Earned on May 12, the night ROH taped their first pay-per-view, Homicide returned to deliver a farewell speech in front of his hometown crowd of New York City.

==== Latin American Xchange (2008) ====
Homicide in 2008

Over a year later, Homicide returned to ROH as one-half of Latin American Xchange, replacing the Motor City Machine Guns who were originally booked. On October 24, 2008, in Danbury, Connecticut, Homicide and his partner Hernandez won a four-way, non-title Iron Team match against Kevin Steen and El Generico, Sweet 'n' Sour Inc.'s Chris Hero and Davey Richards and The Age of the Fall (Jimmy Jacobs and Tyler Black). The next night in Edison, New Jersey, they lost to The Briscoe Brothers.

=== International Wrestling Association (2003, 2009) ===
Homicide wrestled in Puerto Rico for Savio Vega and Miguel Pérez Jr.'s promotion, the International Wrestling Association (IWA), first in 2003 as a challenger to the IWA World Junior Heavyweight Championship, losing to titleholder Freddie "Blitz" Lozada. He subsequently returned in 2009, when LAX exchanged victories with Los Dueños de la Malicia, a tag team composed of Dennis Rivera and Noel Rodríguez, capturing the IWA World Tag Team Championship once.

=== Total Nonstop Action Wrestling (2005–2010) ===
==== Latin American Xchange (2005–2009) ====
Latin American Xchange: Homicide (left) and Hernandez in May 2008

Homicide debuted in Total Nonstop Action Wrestling (TNA) on December 31, 2005, helping Konnan and Apolo beat down Bob Armstrong. The trio, identified as The Latin American Xchange, then challenged Konnan's rivals, B.G. James and Kip James. At Final Resolution on January 15, Konnan and Homicide defeated The Naturals. At Against All Odds on February 12, Homicide and new LAX member Machete lost to The James Gang. At Destination X on March 12, the LAX were once again defeated by the James Gang in a rematch.

On July 20, 2006, Homicide and his new LAX tag team partner, Hernandez, became involved in a feud with A.J. Styles and Christopher Daniels for the NWA World Tag Team Championship. On the episode of Impact! aired on August 24, 2006, Homicide and Hernandez defeated Styles and Daniels in a border brawl to win the NWA World Tag Team Championship. On September 24, 2006, at No Surrender, Homicide and Hernandez lost the NWA World Tag Team Championship back to Styles and Daniels in an Ultimate X match. He and Hernandez regained the title from Styles and Daniels in a Six Sides of Steel match at Bound for Glory after he hit Styles with Da Gringo Killa. On November 19, 2006, LAX defeated America's Most Wanted (AMW) to retain the NWA World Tag Title at Genesis. On December 10, 2006, LAX defeated AMW in a non-title flag match at Turning Point.

LAX went on to defend the tag title against Team 3D at Final Resolution, without Konnan at ringside – who was beaten down by Team 3D (in a kayfabe angle to explain Konnan's absence for surgery) – and retained after Brother Runt, dressed like Santa Claus and apparently drunk, gave a diving headbutt to Homicide, and caused Team 3D to be disqualified. On February 27 edition of Impact!, LAX attacked Johnny Rodz as they were in New York. This was done in retaliation to the attack on Konnan, as was the attack on Brother Ray's uncle a few weeks previous. Johnny Rodz was the man who trained Brother Devon to be a wrestler. Team 3D, in retaliation to that, then made a challenge to LAX, offering to face them at Destination X in a Ghetto Brawl. LAX accepted the offer and defeated Team 3D at the event. LAX later challenged Team 3D to an electrified steel-cage match at Lockdown, at which LAX lost the NWA World Tag Team Championship to Team 3D. With the release of Konnan and Hernandez on a hiatus, Homicide took part in the X-Division Gauntlet at Victory Road but was eliminated by Christopher Daniels.

On the July 26, 2007 episode of Impact!, LAX defeated The Motor City Machine Guns and then come back to the ring to help the Steiner Brothers when VKM and Team 3D started to choke them with the Puerto Rican flag, turning face in the process along with the Steiner Brothers. LAX and VKM faced each other in a tag match at Hard Justice, which LAX won. At TNA's biggest show of the year Bound for Glory, LAX defeated Triple X in an Ultimate X match giving them a shot at the TNA World Tag Team Championship. They got their shot on Impact!, where they lost to A.J. Styles and Tomko.

Latin American Xchange - Homicide (left) and Hernandez - making their entrance at Bound for Glory IV in October 2008

At Destination X in March 2008, LAX got back in the title picture by defeating the Motor City Machine Guns and the Rock 'n Rave Infection (Lance Hoyt and Jimmy Rave) in a number one contender's match. At Sacrifice, LAX won the vacant TNA World Tag Team Championship after defeating Team 3D in the finals of the "Deuces Wild Tag Team Championship Tournament". Homicide and Hernandez then moved into a feud with Beer Money Inc. (James Storm and Robert Roode), first defeating Beer Money in a Fans Revenge Lumberjack match at TNA's Victory Road pay-per-view. A rematch however, took place at the August pay per view, Hard Justice where they lost their tag title to Beer Money Inc. and Erazo was (kayfabe) injured in the process. He made a return by beating on Beer Money with his eye still patched up after Beer Money's match against Shark Boy and Super Eric. At Final Resolution in the Feast or Fired match, Homicide won the briefcase containing a TNA X Division Championship shot, only to have it stolen by The British Invasion of Brutus Magnus, Doug Williams and Rob Terry on the April 30 episode of Impact!. On the July 9, 2009, episode of Impact!, Homicide defeated Williams in a ladder match to win back the briefcase containing the number one contender's contract for the TNA X Division Championship.

On the July 16 episode of Impact!, Homicide cashed in the briefcase on Suicide to win the X Division Championship, winning his first singles title in TNA. At Hard Justice Homicide lost the title to Samoa Joe.

==== World Elite (2009–2010) ====
Homicide in a match against Amazing Red in October 2009

On the September 10, 2009, edition of Impact!, Homicide turned heel by attacking Hernandez and joining World Elite (Eric Young, Sheik Abdul Bashir, Kiyoshi and the British Invasion), thus signaling the end of the Latin American Xchange. Afterwards Homicide's character became an uncontrollable loose cannon, attacking anyone from his opponents to announcers and referees after his matches, rarely being seen with the other members of World Elite. On the October 22 edition of Impact! Homicide defeated the X Division Champion Amazing Red to earn himself a return match for the title at Turning Point. At the Pay-Per-View Red defeated Homicide to retain his title. On the January 4, 2010, live, three-hour, Monday night edition of Impact! Homicide competed in an eight-man Steel Asylum match, which ended in a no contest, after he attacked his opponents, including his World Elite partner Kiyoshi, with a baton. After the match Homicide also attacked Jeff Hardy, who made his return to the company after a four-year absence, but ended up being laid out after a chair shot and the Twist of Fate. This event would also mark the last time World Elite was mentioned on TNA television.

After spending the next couple of months wrestling mainly on Xplosion, Homicide returned to Impact! on March 22, 2010, showing signs of a face turn when he came out to check on his former partner Hernandez, who was being helped by medics after he had been laid out by his new World Tag Team Championship partner Matt Morgan. At Lockdown Homicide defeated Brian Kendrick, Alex Shelley and Chris Sabin in a four-way Xscape match to earn the right to challenge for the vacant X Division Championship in a three-way match against Kazarian and Shannon Moore, later in the night. In the match for the title, Homicide was pinned by Kazarian. On the June 24 edition of Impact! Homicide turned face by attacking Matt Morgan, when he was calling out Hernandez, who was not present at the building. Morgan ended up kicking Homicide's head into the ring post, just like he did with Hernandez three months prior. In July Erazo was sidelined with a groin injury, which he tried to rehab without having to go through surgery. Erazo, who had been requesting for a release from TNA for over a year, was finally released from his contract on August 19, 2010.

=== Various promotions (2010–2014) ===
On September 10, 2010, Homicide returned to Combat Zone Wrestling, where he announced that his return match for the company would take place on October 9, when he would face Sami Callihan. The following day he appeared for Evolve, confronting Johnny Gargano and Jon Moxley. On October 9 Homicide defeated Sami Callihan in the main event of CZW's It's Always Bloody in Philadelphia. On November 20 Homicide made his in-ring debut for Evolve, losing to Jon Moxley via controversial referee stoppage. The following day Homicide made his debut for Chikara, losing to Eddie Kingston in the main event of the evening. On December 11, 2010, at the Cage of Death XII pay-per-view, Homicide challenged Jon Moxley for the CZW World Heavyweight Championship, but was unsuccessful in dethroning the defending champion. On December 19 Homicide unsuccessfully challenged Slyck Wagner Brown for the 2CW Heavyweight Championship at a Squared Circle Wrestling event. In February 2011, Homicide travelled to Perth, Western Australia to compete at New Horizon Pro Wrestling's Battle of Honor event on February 11. He defeated Tama Williams in the main event to win the NHPW Art of Fighting Championship.

In 2011, it was revealed that Homicide had signed a contract to take part in a new hiphop/pro wrestling collaboration, the Urban Wrestling Federation, with tapings of the first three one-hour pay-per-views taking place on June 3. In the main event of the first PPV, First Blood, Homicide defeated Eddie Kingston to advance to the finals of the tournament to determine the first ever UWF Champion. In the main event of the third pay-per-view Street King, a four-way elimination match for the UWF Championship, Homicide managed to eliminate Bestia, before being eliminated himself by Ricky Reyes. Eventually, Rasche Brown went on to become the inaugural champion.

On June 29, 2012, Homicide took part in Extreme Rising promotion's first event in Corona, New York, defeating Devon Storm. On November 17 at Remember November, Homicide was defeated by Rhino in the first round of the Extreme Rising World Championship tournament. On June 23, 2013, Homicide and Eddie Kingston were defeated by the Steiner Brothers at a House of Hardcore event. On November 9, Homicide and Kingston were defeated by Devon and Matt Hardy at House of Hardcore 3. On September 19, 2014, Homicide returned to Chikara, when he, Hernandez and Chavo Guerrero Jr., representing LAX, took part in the 2014 King of Trios. They were eliminated from the tournament in the first round by the Golden Trio (Dasher Hatfield, Icarus and Mark Angelosetti).

=== Ring of Honor (2010–2013) ===
On September 11, 2010, Homicide made his return to Ring of Honor at the live Glory By Honor IX pay-per-view, where he confronted Roderick Strong, who had just defeated Tyler Black for the ROH World Championship. On October 1 Homicide wrestled his first match since his release from TNA, defeating Tony Kozina at a Ring of Honor Wrestling taping. On December 18 Homicide made his ROH pay-per-view debut at Final Battle 2010, where he defeated ROH World Television Champion Christopher Daniels in a non–title match to earn a shot at the ROH World Championship at the following pay-per-view. Homicide received his shot at the ROH World Championship on February 26, 2011, at 9th Anniversary Show, but was unable to regain the title from Roderick Strong in a No Holds Barred match. On March 19, 2011 at Manhattan Mayhem IV, the Latin American Xchange wrestled their first match together in 19 months, when they faced the ROH World Tag Team Champions, The Kings of Wrestling (Chris Hero and Claudio Castagnoli) in a losing effort. Homicide then began feuding with The Embassy, suffering an upset loss against Tommaso Ciampa on April 2 at Honor Takes Center Stage, albeit following outside interference from Princess Mia. After the match Homicide threw a steel chair at the Embassy's barrister R.D. Evans. Homicide faced Ciampa in a rematch on May 6, but was defeated again following outside interference from Mia and a brass knuckles shot from Ciampa. Afterwards, Homicide took out his frustrations on Embassy member Ernesto Osiris. Following the event, R.D. Evans filed a storyline lawsuit against Homicide, accusing him of attempted murder, assault and battery, attempted sexual assault and battery, sexual harassment and intentional infliction of emotional distress. On June 26 at Best in the World 2011, Homicide defeated Embassy's newest member Rhino in a Street Fight. The event marked Homicide's final appearance for ROH as he had signed an exclusive contract with the Urban Wrestling Federation.

Homicide returned to ROH on September 17, 2011 at the Death Before Dishonor IX internet pay-per-view, as his UWF contract prohibited him only from working television shows and regular pay-per-views. At the event, Homicide teamed with fellow TNA alum and ROH World Television Champion Jay Lethal in a tag team match, where they were defeated by Embassy representatives Rhino and Tommaso Ciampa, when Ciampa pinned Homicide. Homicide's next ROH appearance took place on March 4, 2012, at the ROH 10th Anniversary Show, where he was defeated by Mike Bennett. At the May 18 tapings of Ring of Honor Wrestling, Homicide returned to ROH, saving Eddie Edwards from Mike Bennett and "Brutal" Bob Evans, before turning on him and laying him out with Da Cop Killa. On June 24 at Best in the World 2012: Hostage Crisis, Homicide defeated Edwards in a singles match. As a result, Homicide was granted a shot at the ROH World Championship, but was defeated by the defending champion, Kevin Steen, on August 3.

On August 17, 2013, Homicide returned to ROH, forming a new tag team with Eddie Kingston. In their return match, the two defeated Marshall Law (Q.T. Marshall and R.D. Evans). Following the main event of the evening, Homicide and Kingston attacked new ROH World Tag Team Champions, reDRagon (Bobby Fish and Kyle O'Reilly), before announcing their intention of taking down "corporate ROH" and revealing their team name as "Outlaw Inc.". Homicide and Kingston, however, claimed that they had come to ROH to help Match Maker Nigel McGuinness and take out those they felt were bad for the promotion. As part of the gimmick, Homicide and Kingston wore suits and followed the Code of Honor. After defeating The American Wolves (Davey Richards and Eddie Edwards) on November 16, Outlaw Inc. were named the next challengers for the ROH World Tag Team Championship. Outlaw Inc. received their title shot on December 14 at Final Battle 2013, but were defeated by reDRagon. Post-match, Homicide announced that they were no longer going to play by ROH's rules.

=== Dragon Gate USA (2010–2011) ===
On October 29 at the Bushido: Code of the Warrior pay-per-view, Homicide made his debut for Dragon Gate USA, in a match, where he, representing the World–1 stable, defeated Rich Swann. Afterwards, Homicide was attacked backstage by Jon Moxley, a member of the rival Kamikaze USA stable. At the following day's tapings of Freedom Fight 2010, Homicide and his World–1 stable mate BxB Hulk defeated Kamikaze USA's Jon Moxley and Akira Tozawa in a tag team match. After the match both Homicide and Hulk were laid out by Kamikaze USA. On January 30, 2011, at United: Finale Homicide faced Moxley in a No Rules match. Homicide dominated the match, before suddenly allowing Moxley to pin himself for the win. After the match Homicide explained that he did not care about winning or losing and continued to attack Moxley, before he was saved by Akira Tozawa.

=== New Japan Pro-Wrestling (2011) ===
On May 13, Homicide made his debut for New Japan Pro-Wrestling, during the NJPW Invasion Tour 2011, the promotion's first tour of the United States, teaming with Low Ki in a tag team match, where they defeated Jushin Thunder Liger and Tiger Mask. At the following day's event, Homicide teamed with Davey Richards and Rhino in a six-man tag team match, where they defeated Kazuchika Okada, Ryusuke Taguchi and Togi Makabe. On the third and final day of the tour in Philadelphia, Homicide and Low Ki, known collectively as the Strong Style Thugz, unsuccessfully challenged Apollo 55 (Prince Devitt and Ryusuke Taguchi) for the IWGP Junior Heavyweight Tag Team Championship.

=== Total Nonstop Action Wrestling (2013–2015, 2017–2018)) ===
==== Beat Down Clan (2013–2015) ====
Homicide (top) and Dasher Hatfield in September 2014

On March 17, 2013, Homicide returned to TNA to take part in the tapings of the 10 Reunion One Night Only pay-per-view, teaming with Hernandez in a three-way tag team match, where they were defeated by Team 3D and which also included Bad Influence (Christopher Daniels and Kazarian). Two days later, LAX defeated The Disciples of the New Church (Sinn and Slash) at the tapings of the Hardcore Justice 2 pay-per-view. Homicide made another return to TNA on July 18 to take part in the Destination X episode of Impact Wrestling. Entering a tournament to determine the new X Division Champion, he was defeated by Sonjay Dutt in a first round three-way match, which also included Petey Williams. Homicide returned to TNA on June 26, 2014, to take part in the tapings of Destination X, losing to Samoa Joe in a three-way match, which also included Tigre Uno. Following the taping, it was reported that Homicide was back in TNA full-time going forward.

On the April 10, 2015, episode of Impact Wrestling, Homicide returned to attacking The Rising and joining the Beat Down Clan, most likely to replace Samoa Joe who had left the company. The following week on Impact Wrestling, Homicide was assigned by MVP to attack Kurt Angle, which led to a backstage brawl spilling into the ring which caused both The BDC and The Rising to get involved. Then Homicide suffered a shoulder injury. During his injury, The Beat Down Clan was dissolved on July 15, 2015. Homicide's profile on the Impactwrestling.com roster page was moved to the alumni section on July 24, confirming his departure from the company.

==== Latin American Xchange (2017–2018) ====
On March 16, 2017, episode of Impact, Homicide returned with Konnan, reforming the Latin American Xchange (LAX) alongside newcomers Ortiz, Santana, and Diamante. On the July 5, 2018, episode of Impact, he turned on LAX by forming an alliance with King and his former tag team partner Hernandez, turning heel in the process. They later became known as The OGz. At the Bound for Glory on October 14, The OGz lost to LAX in a Concrete Jungle Death match. After several months, Homicide was moved to alumni section of the website.

=== Late career (2018–2025) ===
Homicide (left) and Rocky Romero in April 2023

Homicide debuted for the National Wrestling Alliance (NWA) at their television tapings on September 30 for NWA Power. At the tapings he formed an alliance with Eddie Kingston. At the pay-per-view Crockett Cup event, Homicide defeated Austin Aries, Colby Corino, and Darius Lockhart to become the NWA World Junior Heavyweight Championship. He lost the title on November 12, 2022 at NWA Hard Times 3 to Kerry Morton, ending his reign at 237 days.

On March 26, 2021, at ROH 19th Anniversary Show, Homicide made a Ring of Honor return, in a new faction called Violence Unlimited consisting of Tony Deppen, Brody King, and Chris Dickinson as they attacked La Faccion Ingobernable.

On September 24, 2021, Homicide made his All Elite Wrestling debut at Rampage: Grand Slam, coming to the rescue of Jon Moxley and Eddie Kingston during their Lights Out match against Minoru Suzuki and Lance Archer.

Homicide made a return to New Japan Pro-Wrestling on the May 15, 2022 episode of NJPW Strong, losing to Will Ospreay. In October 2022, Homicide would start a feud with Tom Lawlor, which ended at Battle in the Valley, in a Filthy Rules Fight, which Homicide lost. In 2023 at NJPW Independence Day, he would team up with Jon Moxley to face Jun Kasai and El Desperado at Korakuen Hall in a Doomsday No Disqualification match which the pair lost. He would make his final New Japan Pro Wrestling appearance in 2024 at Windy City Riot as a surprise entrant in the Riot Rules match supporting Eddie Kingston against the Bullet Club.

On March 20, 2025, Erazo announced we would have to retire from professional wrestling due to a cyst on his brain. This cyst had been present for months at the time of writing, and was beginning to affect his speech and his vision. He announced his final match would be that night, a tag team match against Santana and Afa Jr., teaming with Bull James.

== Personal life ==
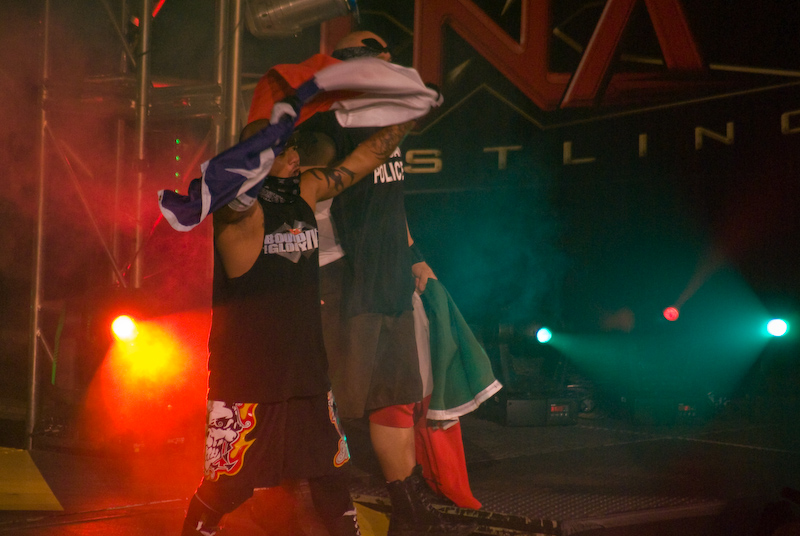
Erazo hoisting the flag of Puerto Rico

Erazo is a member of the large Puerto Rican community in New York, colloquially known as "Nuyoricans". He initially wrestled as The Latin Terror, a reference to his Latin American ethnicity. However, Erazo grew bored with the gimmick in 1995 and decided to create a new character based on his own past. He had been a gang member as a youth, and he incorporated this into the Homicide character, taking his ring name from an episode of America's Most Wanted where a man was arrested for the crime of homicide. Erazo has subsequently stated that he represents both "New York and Puerto Rico", frequently implementing the flag of Puerto Rico into his wrestling apparel and often carrying one to the ring. Outside of professional wrestling, Erazo was married in 1994 and is the father of two children, a son and a daughter.

== Championships and accomplishments ==
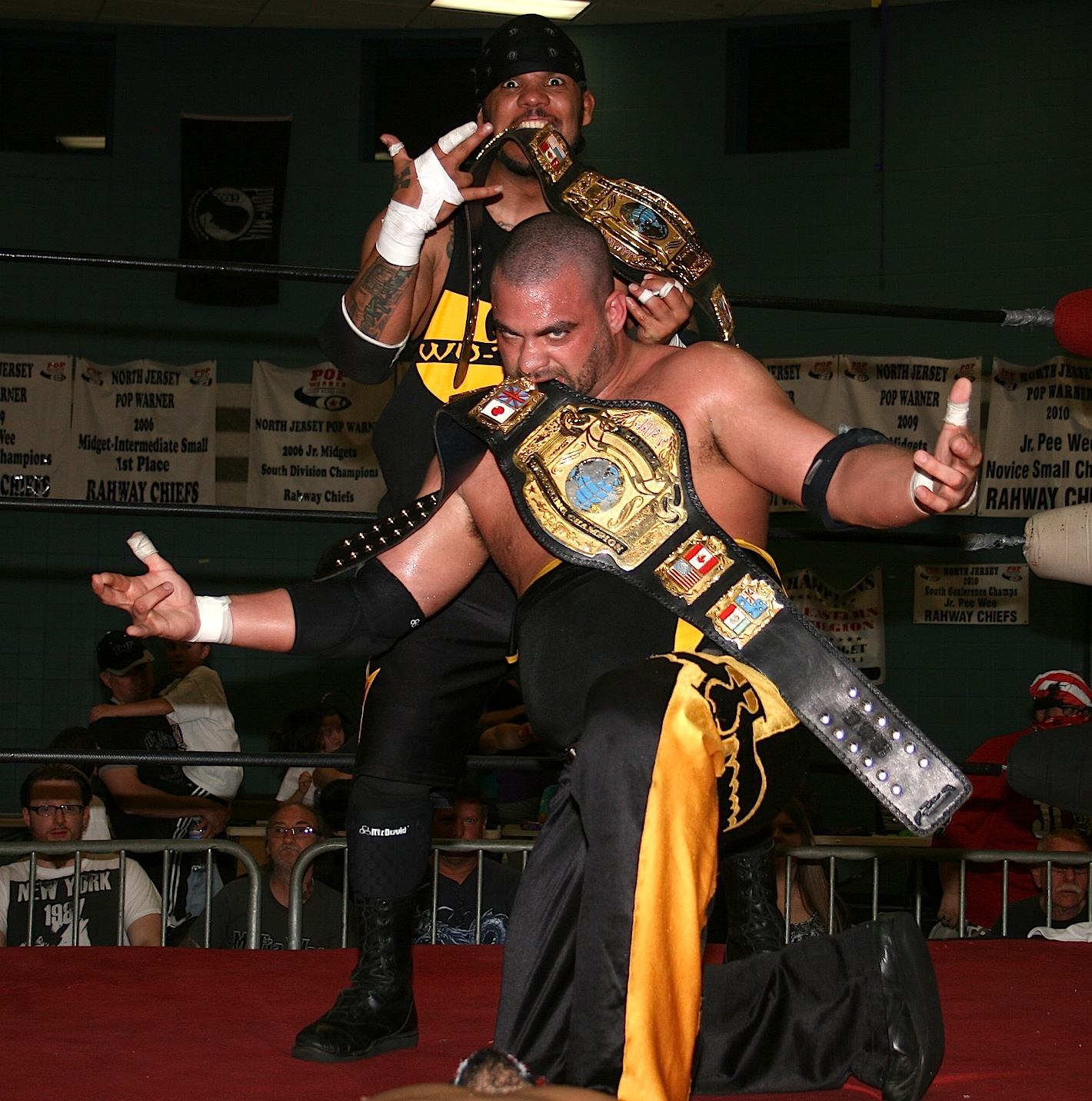
Homicide and Eddie Kingston as the JAPW Tag Team Champions in April 2012

Homicide as one-half of the TNA World Tag Team Champions in September 2008

- AAA
  - Tag Team Tournament (2006) – with Low Ki, AJ Styles and Samoa Joe
- Assault Championship Wrestling
  - ACW Great American Championship (1 time)
- Big Japan Pro Wrestling
  - BJW Junior Heavyweight Championship (1 time)
- Catalyst Wrestling
  - Catalyst Wrestling Heavyweight Championship (1 time)
- Doghouse Championship Wrestling
  - DCW Heavyweight Championship (1 time)
  - DCW Tag Team Championship (1 time) – with Grim Reefer
- Eastern Pro Wrestling
  - EPW Cruiserweight Championship (1 time)
- Full Impact Pro
  - FIP Heavyweight Championship (1 time, inaugural)
  - FIP Heavyweight Championship Tournament (2004)
- Impact Championship Wrestling
  - ICW Heavyweight Championship (1 time)
  - ICW Tag Team Championship (1 time) – with Boogalou
- Indie Wrestling Hall of Fame
  - Class of 2022
- International Wrestling Association
  - IWA World Tag Team Championship (1 time) – with Hernandez
  - IWA World Junior Heavyweight Championship (1 time)
- Independent Wrestling Association Mid-South
  - IWA Mid-South Tag Team Championship (1 time) – with Eddie Kingston
- International Wrestling Union
  - IWU Georgia Championship (3 times)
- Jersey All Pro Wrestling
  - JAPW Heavyweight Championship (7 times)
  - JAPW Tag Team Championship (7 times, final) – with Kane D (2), Don Montoya (1), B-Boy (1), Teddy Hart (1), Hernandez (1) and Eddie Kingston (1)
  - JAPW Hall of Fame (2016)
- Jersey Championship Wrestling
  - JCW Championship (1 time)
- Long Island Wrestling Federation
  - LIWF Heavyweight Championship (1 time)
  - LIWF Lightweight Championship (1 time)
  - LIWF New Jersey Championship (1 time)
- National Wrestling Alliance
  - NWA World Junior Heavyweight Championship (1 time)
- New Horizon Pro Wrestling
  - Global Conflict Shield Tournament (2011)
  - NHPW Art of Fighting Championship (1 time)
- Outlaw Wrestling
  - Outlaw Wrestling Championship (3 times, inaugural)
  - Outlaw Wrestling Title Tournament (2021)
- Pro Wrestling Guerrilla
  - PWG Tag Team Championship (1 time) – with B-Boy
  - Tango & Cash Invitational (2004) – with B-Boy
- Pro Wrestling Illustrated
  - Ranked No. 54 of the top 500 singles wrestlers in the PWI 500 in 2007
- Pro Wrestling Unplugged
  - PWU Heavyweight Championship (1 time)
- Ring of Honor
  - ROH World Championship (1 time)
  - ROH World Tag Team Championship (1 time) – with Chris Dickinson
  - Trios Tournament (2005) – with Ricky Reyes and Rocky Romero
  - #1 Contenders Trophy (2003)
- River City Wrestling (San Antonio)
  - RCW Legends Championship (1 time)
  - RCW Tag Team Championship (1 time) – with Hernandez
- Midwest American Stampade of Wrestling
  - MAS Cruiserweight Championship (1 time)
- Super Powers of Wrestling
  - SPO Heavyweight Championship (1 time)
- World Xtreme Wrestling
  - WXW Samoan Cup Tag Team Tournament (2004) – with Boogalou
- Total Nonstop Action Wrestling
  - NWA World Tag Team Championship (2 times) – with Hernandez
  - TNA World Tag Team Championship (1 time) – with Hernandez
  - TNA X Division Championship (1 time)
  - Deuces Wild Tag Team Tournament (2008) – with Hernandez
  - Feast or Fired (2008 – X Division Championship contract)
  - TNA Year End Award (1 time)
    - Match of the Year (2006) with Hernandez vs. A.J. Styles and Christopher Daniels at TNA Surrender on September 24, 2006
- USA Pro Wrestling / USA Xtreme Wrestling
  - USA Pro Heavyweight Championship (1 time)
  - USA Pro United States Championship (1 time)
  - UXW Xtreme Championship (2 times)
- VIP Wrestling
  - VIP Heavyweight Championship (1 time)
- Wrestling of Mid-Future
  - WMF All Borough Championship (3 times)
- Warriors of Wrestling
  - WOW No Limits Championship (1 time)
- Wrestling Observer Newsletter
  - Best Gimmick (2006) with Hernandez as The Latin American Xchange
  - Tag Team of the Year (2006) with Hernandez as The Latin American Xchange
