= Hard Justice (2008) =

2008 Total Nonstop Action Wrestling pay-per-view event

- Promotional poster for the event featuring The Latin American Xchange (Hernandez and Homicide) (left) and Samoa Joe (right)
- Promotion: Total Nonstop Action Wrestling (TNA)
- Date: August 10, 2008
- City: Trenton, New Jersey
- Venue: Sovereign Bank Arena
- Attendance: 3,500

Pay-per-view chronology
← Previous; Victory Road	Next → No Surrender

Hard Justice chronology
← Previous; 2007	Next → 2009

The 2008 Hard Justice was a professional wrestling pay-per-view (PPV) event produced by the Total Nonstop Action Wrestling (TNA) promotion that took place on August 10, 2008 at the Sovereign Bank Arena in Trenton, New Jersey. It was the fourth event under the Hard Justice name and the eighth event in the 2008 TNA PPV schedule. Seven professional wrestling matches were featured on the event's card, three of which were for championships.

The main event was a Six Sides of Steel Weapons match for the TNA World Heavyweight Championship, in which the champion Samoa Joe defeated the challenger Booker T to retain the title. Another heavily promoted bout was a Last Man Standing match between Kurt Angle and A.J. Styles, which the latter won. The card also featured a match for the TNA World Tag Team Championship, which saw Beer Money, Inc. (James Storm and Robert Roode) defeat The Latin American Xchange (Hernandez and Homicide) to become the new champions. A New Jersey Street Fight was also held pitting the team of Christian Cage and Rhino against Team 3D (Brother Devon and Brother Ray). Cage and Rhino were the victors in the contest.

Hard Justice featured the start of a storyline between veteran wrestlers and younger wrestlers in TNA along with marking the beginning of Jeff Jarrett's return to active competition. 35,000 was the reported figure of purchasers for the event by The Wrestling Observer Newsletter. Hard Justice had a reported attendance between 2,300 and 3,500 people. Canadian Online Explorer writer John Pollock reviewed the show and felt it featured the "usual assortment of wacky finishes and outside interference" but that "all in all it was a solid show." Wade Keller and James Caldwell of the Pro Wrestling Torch Newsletter both reviewed the event, praising the Last Man Standing match saying it was a "superb" and "epic match."

In October 2017, with the launch of the Global Wrestling Network, the event became available to stream on demand.

== Production ==
=== Background ===
The fourth installment under the Hard Justice name was announced in January 2008 with an August 10th date attached. In May, TNA hoped to host a PPV event in the Northeastern United States sometime before the end of the year. Hard Justice was the PPV under consideration. TNA issued a press release in late-June revealing that Hard Justice would be held at the Sovereign Bank Arena in Trenton, New Jersey. Tickets for the show went on-sale on June 27. TNA released a poster to promote the event featuring The Latin American Xchange (Hernandez and Homicide; LAX) and Samoa Joe; the poster also promoted a musical appearance by rap artists Filthee, Grandmaster Caz, and Ice-T. The official theme for the show was "AyAyAya" by Filthee.

=== Storylines ===
Hard Justice featured seven professional wrestling matches that involved different wrestlers from pre-existing scripted feuds and storylines. Wrestlers portrayed villains, heroes, or less distinguishable characters in the scripted events that built tension and culminated in a wrestling match or series of matches.

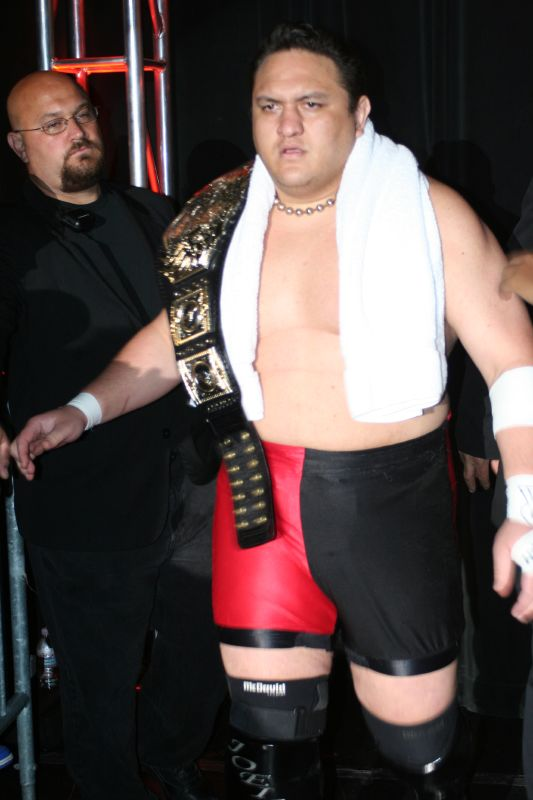
Samoa Joe (pictured) defended the TNA World Heavyweight Championship at Hard Justice.

The main event at Hard Justice was a Six Sides of Steel Weapons match for the TNA World Heavyweight Championship between the champion Samoa Joe and the challenger Booker T. Joe and Booker T previously fought at TNA's Slammiversary PPV event on June 8 in a King of the Mountain match for the title, which Joe won to remain champion. The duo also fought at TNA's previous PPV event Victory Road on July 13, which ended in a no contest after interference from Sting allowed Booker T to gain an unofficial pinfall counted by his legitimate wife Sharmell instead of an official referee. On the July 17 episode of TNA's television program TNA Impact!, Booker T proclaimed that he was the new TNA World Heavyweight Champion before Management Director Jim Cornette announced that Booker T did not win the match and that Joe was still the TNA World Heavyweight Champion, despite Booker T having taken possession of the title belt. Cornette then scheduled a rematch between the two for the title at Hard Justice; Joe did not retrieve physical possession of the title belt after this, instead chose to reclaim the physical belt after he beat Booker T at the event. On the July 24 episode of Impact!, Joe and Booker T made the contest a Six Sides of Steel Weapons match.

The predominant storyline heading into the event was the rivalry between A.J. Styles and Kurt Angle, both members of The Angle Alliance. On the February 14 episode of Impact!, TNA held the scripted wedding of Angle's real-life wife Karen Angle and Styles despite Angle and Karen still being married on-screen. Afterwards, Karen and Angle separated in the storyline on the March 13 episode of Impact!. TNA continued to build the situation with Angle attempting to reconcile with Karen on the May 15 episode of Impact!; TNA began to phase out the marriage between Styles and Karen also. Karen refused Angle's request on the May 22 episode of Impact!, leading to Angle turning on and assaulting Styles later in the episode due to his jealousy of the affection Karen showed for Styles. This led to a match between the two at Slammiversary which Styles won after a distraction by Karen. The two faced in a Lumberjack match on the June 12 episode of Impact!, which Angle won before it ended in a brawl between Styles, Angle, Tomko, Christian Cage, Rhino, Abyss, and Team 3D (Brother Devon and Brother Ray). Afterwards, Team 3D and the team of Cage and Rhino became involved in the feud with Team 3D joining Angle, while Cage and Rhino sided with Styles. The two teams then fought in a Full Metal Mayhem at Victory Road, which the team of Angle and Team 3D won. The teams fought again on the July 24 episode of Impact!, this time in a Six Man Tag Team Elimination Tables match, which Angle and Team 3D also won. On the July 31 episode of Impact!, while Styles stood in a ring surrounded by a steel cage, Angle attacked Styles from behind and slammed him back-first into the mat, rendering him unconscious. As a result of this action, Styles challenged Angle to a Last Man Standing match at Hard Justice; Angle accepted the challenge.

The TNA World Tag Team Championship was defended at Hard Justice by LAX against Beer Money, Inc. (James Storm and Robert Roode). On the June 12 episode of Impact!, Roode and Storm teamed to face LAX for the World Tag Team Championship. The match was originally won by Roode and Storm before being restarted due to interference. LAX won the restart to retain the championship. After the bout, Roode and Storm assaulted LAX and their manager Héctor Guerrero. Management Director Jim Cornette scheduled a title defense at Victory Road between LAX and Roode and Storm under "Fan's Revenge" Lumberjack rules on the June 19 episode of Impact!. At Victory Road, LAX defeated the newly renamed Beer Money Incorporated to retain the World Tag Team Championship. On the July 17 episode of Impact!, Roode and Storm began assaulting various wrestlers, crew members, and fans in retaliation for their loss at Victory Road. Later in the program, Roode and Storm once again attacked Guerrero, prompting LAX to come to his rescue. On the July 31 episode of Impact!, Roode and Storm defeated the team of Christian Cage and Rhino for a World Tag Team Championship match at Hard Justice. On the August 7 episode of Impact!, the team of Cage, Rhino, and LAX fought the team of Roode, Storm, and Team 3D in an Eight Man Tag Team match, which the latter lost. After the contest, Roode and Storm slammed Homicide through a glass table, injuring his right eye in the storyline.

Team 3D fought the team of Christian Cage and Rhino in a New Jersey Street Fight at Hard Justice. This match was a break-off from the rivalry between A.J. Styles and Kurt Angle. After Team 3D, Cage, and Rhino became involved in the rivalry, Team 3D injured both Cage and Rhino in the narrative leading into Victory Road. Rhino was knocked out on the June 19 episode of Impact!, while on the June 26 episode of Impact! Cage was slammed through a glass table by Brother Ray. After the match at Victory Road and a Six Man Tag Team Elimination Tables match on Impact!, Team 3D cost Cage and Rhino a shot at the World Tag Team Championship on the July 31 episode of Impact!. Afterwards, Cage challenged Team 3D to a New Jersey Street Fight at Hard Justice, which Team 3D accepted.

== Event ==
The telecast began with a live performance of the event theme song "AyAyAya" by Filthee along with Grandmaster Caz and Melle Mel. Ice-T was advertised to perform but was absent with no reason given and was replaced by Mel. It later came to light that Ice-T was unable to attend as a result of "travel problems."

=== Miscellaneous ===
Hard Justice featured employees other than the wrestlers involved in the matches. Mike Tenay and Don West were the commentators for the telecast. Jeremy Borash and David Penzer were ring announcers for the event. Andrew Thomas, Earl Hebner, Rudy Charles, Mark "Slick" Johnson, and Traci Brooks participated as referees for the encounters. Lauren Thompson and Borash were used as interviewers during the event. Besides employees who appeared in a wrestling role, Rhaka Khan, Sheik Abdul Bashir, Raisha Saeed, Jacqueline, Héctor Guerrero, Salinas, Johnny Devine, Abyss, Sting, and Kevin Nash all appeared on camera, either in backstage or in ringside segments.

=== Preliminary matches ===
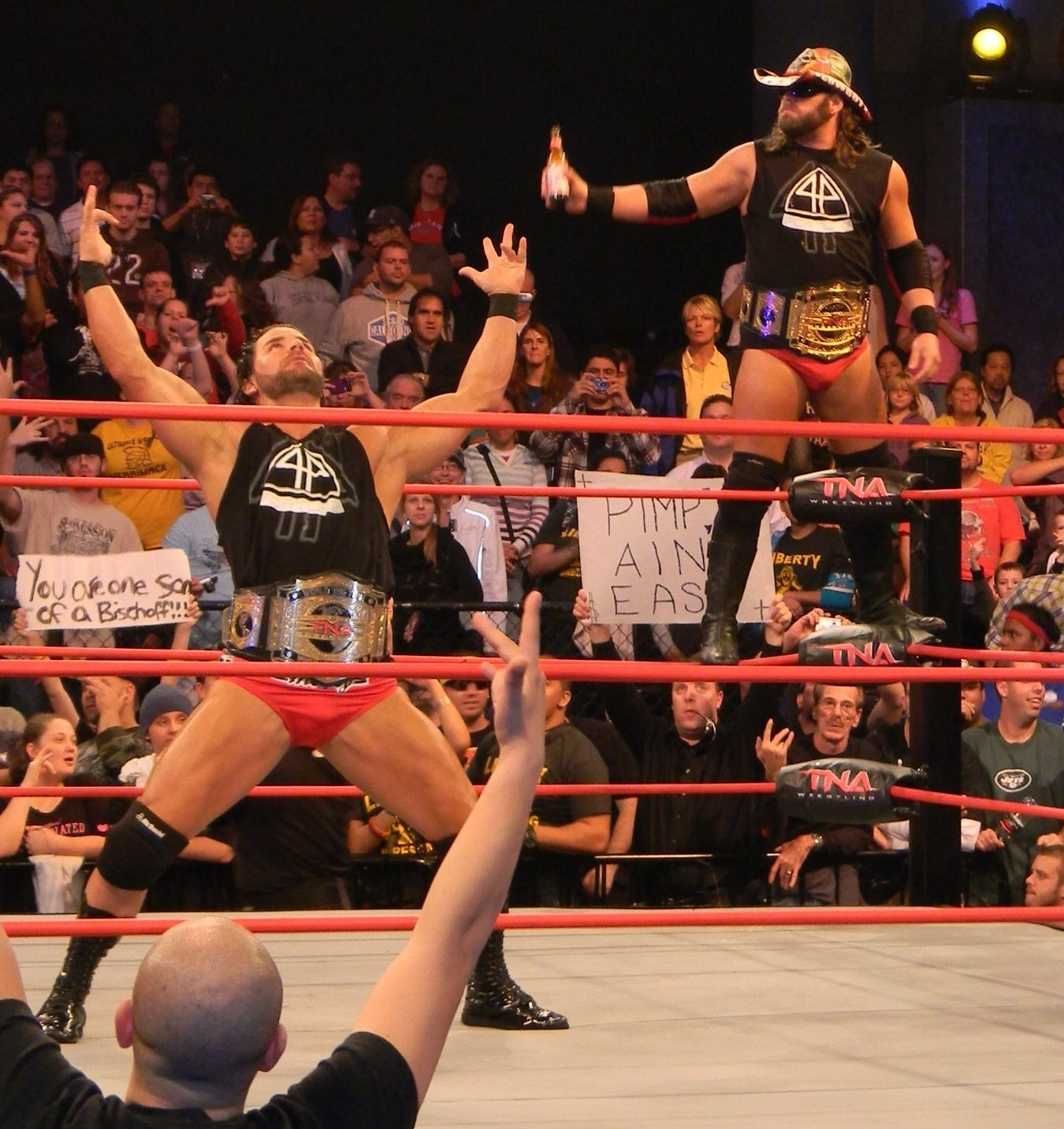
Beer Money, Inc. (James Storm [right] and Robert Roode [left]; pictured) won the TNA World Tag Team Championship (pictured) at Hard Justice.

The opening bout was for the TNA X Division Championship between the champion Petey Williams and the challenger Consequences Creed. The duration of the match was 12 minutes and 30 seconds. Williams was accompanied to the ring by Rhaka Khan, who interfered in the contest trying to aid Williams to no avail. Near the end of the match, Sheik Abdul Bashir walked out to the ring and bashed Creed across the back with a steel chair, which allowed Williams to force Creed's head into the mat with his signature Canadian Destroyer maneuver. Williams followed with the pin to win the match and retain the TNA X Division Championship. After the bout, Bashir continued to attack Creed.

The second contest of the show was a Six Woman Tag Team match pitting the team of Gail Kim, ODB, and Taylor Wilde against the team of Awesome Kong and The Beautiful People (Angelina Love and Velvet Sky). Kong was accompanied to the ring by Raisha Saeed. Wilde won the match for her team with a pinning maneuver on Love at 11 minutes and 27 seconds.

The TNA World Tag Team Championship was defended by LAX against Beer Money, Inc. in the next encounter. Jacqueline accompanied Beer Money to the ring, while Salinas and Héctor Guerrero accompanied LAX. The duration of the encounter was 14 minutes and 15 seconds. Filthee, Grandmaster Caz, and Melle Mel performed LAX's theme during their entrance. Near the end of the contest, Jacqueline and Salinas both interfered in the match. This led to Roode smacking Homicide in his injured right eye with a beer bottle while the referee was not looking. Storm then gained the pinfall to win the TNA World Tag Team Championship for his team.

TNA held a Black Tie Brawl and Chain match between Jay Lethal and Sonjay Dutt, which lasted 11 minutes and 14 seconds. In this match, both competitors were tied together via a chain and dressed in tuxedos. The only way to win was to strip their opponent of the tuxedo and either make them submit or pin them afterwards. Lethal won the encounter after jumping off of a turnbuckle to drive his elbow into Dutt's chest and followed with the pin.

=== Main event matches ===
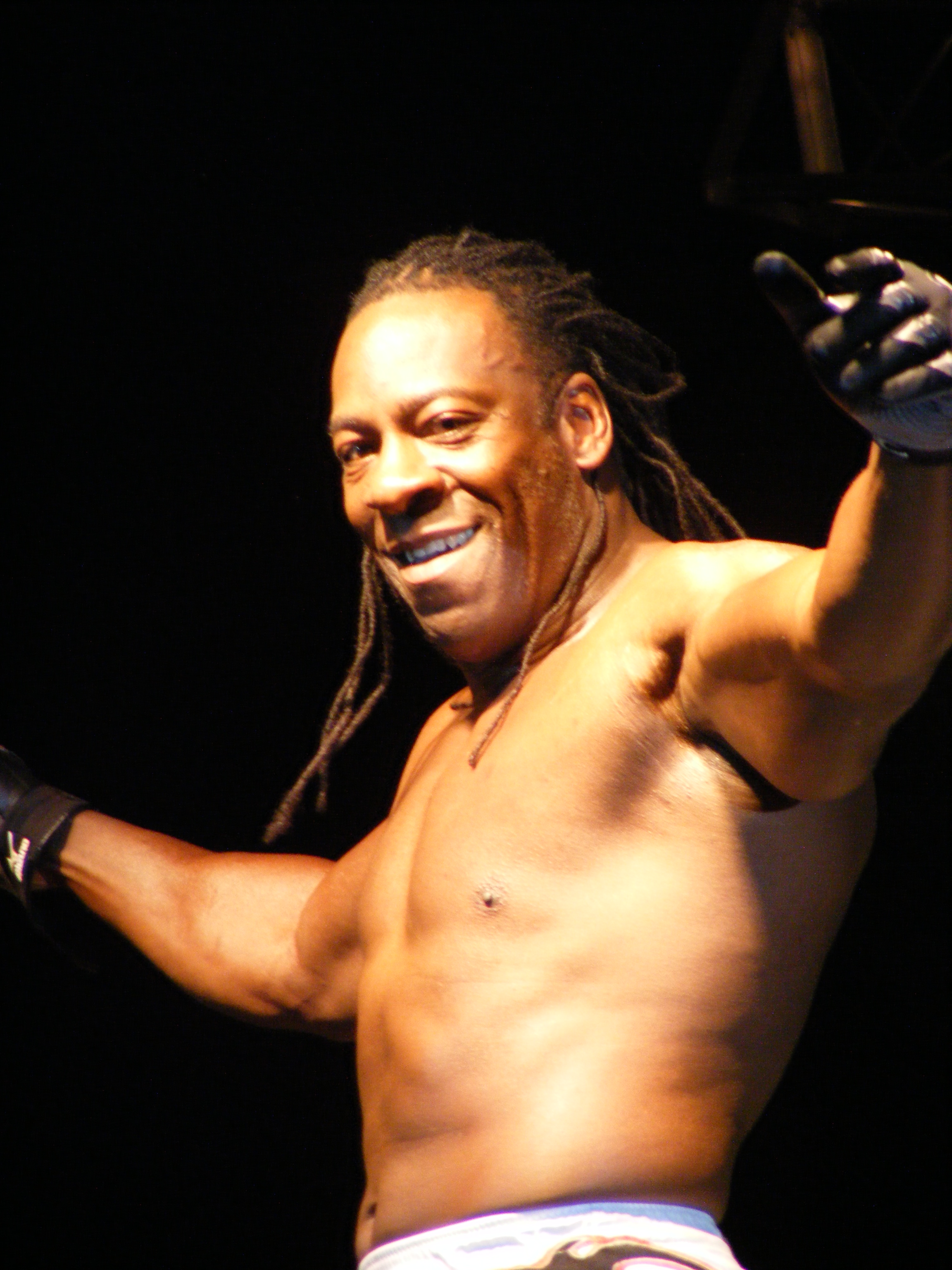
Booker T (pictured) challenged Samoa Joe for the TNA World Heavyweight Championship at Hard Justice.

The fifth match on the card was a New Jersey Street Fight pitting the team of Christian Cage and Rhino against Team 3D (Brother Devon and Brother Ray). In this match, weapons were legal to use and there were no count-outs or disqualifications. Early in the match, both teams fought throughout the crowd, at which time they both used weapons against each other. The match ended when Cage performed a frog splash aerial maneuver onto Ray from atop a ladder, followed up by Rhino performing his signature Gore maneuver into Ray against a table placed up in the ring corner. Rhino then pinned Ray to win the contest at 15 minutes and 22 seconds. After the match, Team 3D's associate Johnny Devine came out to help attack Cage and Rhino, however, Abyss came to their rescue and slammed Devine back-first onto the mat with his trademark Black Hole Slam maneuver while Team 3D made their retreat.

A.J. Styles fought Kurt Angle in a Last Man Standing match next. In a Last Man Standing match, there are no disqualifications or count outs, instead to win the match the competitor has to force their opponent to not be able to reach a standing position by the count of 10. However, this match was only promoted as a Last Man Standing match, instead it was held under Texas Death match rules where a wrestler must pin or submit their opponent and then have them fail to respond to a count of 10. Styles got the first fall of the night, when he forced Angle to tap out to Angle's own signature submission maneuver the Ankle lock. Angle made it to his feet before the count concluded. Angle gained a pinfall later on in the match after slamming Styles off the top of a padded turnbuckle with a suplex. Before Styles could reach his feet to beat the count, Angle slammed Styles onto the mat back-first with his signature Olympic slam maneuver and gained another pinfall to start the count over. Styles beat that count as well, with Angle trying for the Olympic Slam again before Styles' countered it into his signature Styles' Clash maneuver and pinned Angle. After Angle reached his feet, Styles and Angle fought up a padded turnbuckle with Styles gaining the advantage. At this time, Styles grabbed Angle by the neck and fell backwards from the turnbuckle and drove Angle head-first into the mat. Angle failed to reach the 10 count afterwards, with Styles being declared the winner of the contest at 24 minutes and 50 seconds. Following the encounter, the referee called for medical attention for Angle who was scripted to appear as if he had suffered a neck injury. Styles then entered the ring once Angle reached his feet and lifted Angle up and dropped him on his head. As Styles walked up the ramp, he was attacked by Sting, who drove Styles' head into the ramp with his signature Scorpion Death Drop maneuver, as Kevin Nash looked on.

The main event was a Six Sides of Steel Weapons match for the TNA World Heavyweight Championship, pitting the champion Samoa Joe against the challenger Booker T, who was accompanied by Sharmell. The duration of the contest was 12 minutes and 44 seconds. Early in the bout, Booker T hit Joe in the face with a steel chair, resulting in Joe bleeding from the forehead. Later on, Booker T slammed Joe back-first onto two chairs with his signature Book End maneuver, however, Joe kicked out of a pinfall attempt. Joe gained the pinfall victory to retain the TNA World Heavyweight Championship after bashing Booker T over the head with a guitar that had appeared in the ring after the lights had suddenly gone off and back on.

== Reception ==
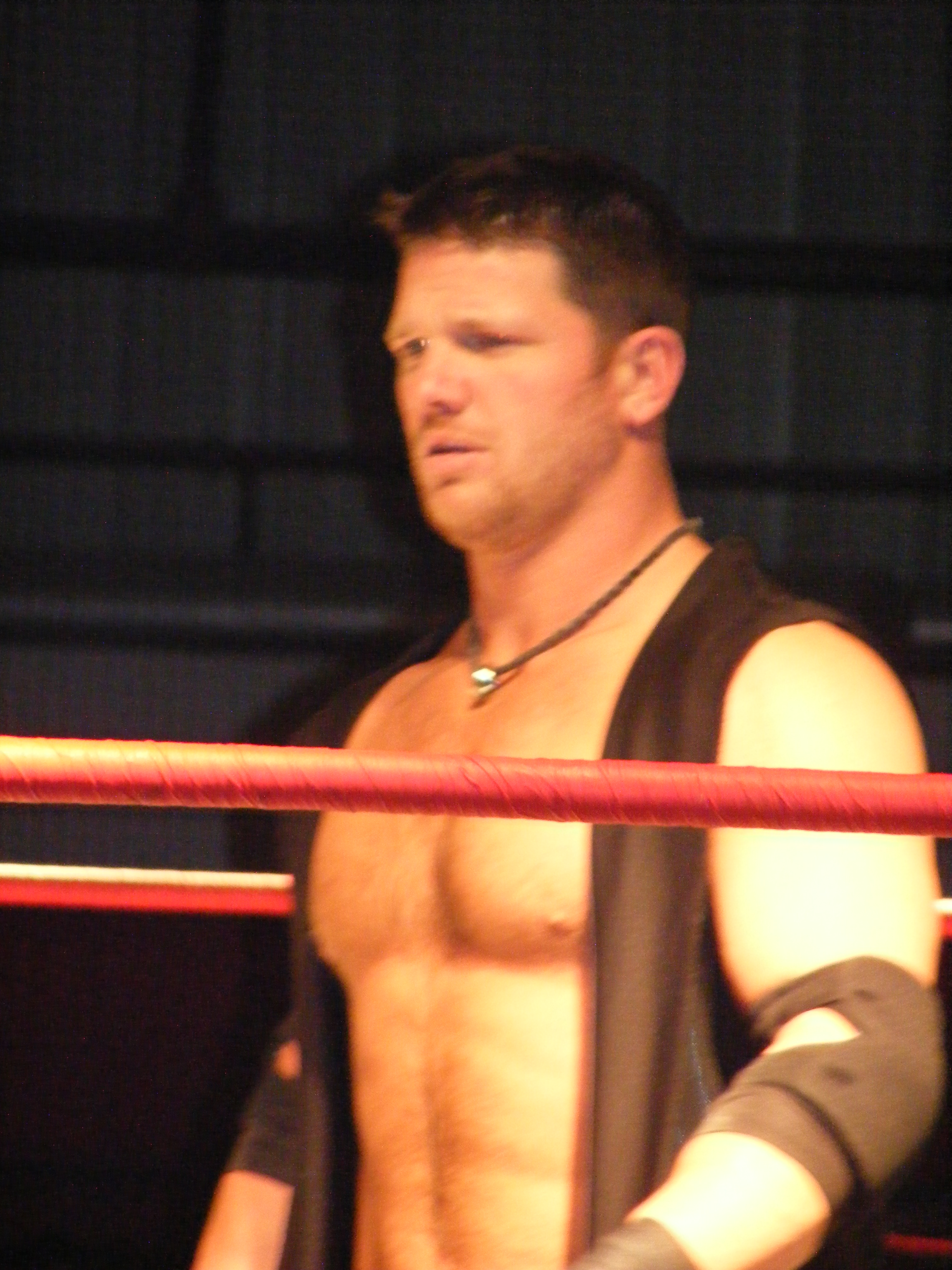
James Caldwell of the Pro Wrestling Torch Newsletter felt the Last Man Standing match made A.J. Styles (pictured) look "like a star when he won."

A total of 3,500 people attended Hard Justice, while The Wrestling Observer Newsletter reported that 35,000 people bought the event. However, the attendance number has been disputed, with it also being reported that Hard Justice drew an attendance of 2,300 people.

Canadian Online Explorer writer John Pollock reviewed the show and felt it featured the "usual assortment of wacky finishes and outside interference" but that "all in all it was a solid show." Pollock commented on the musical performance shown at the beginning of the telecast, stating the "crowd is silent in appreciation." "Crowd is very hot for this opener and the atmosphere should hopefully add to this show", stated Pollock when covering the TNA X Division Championship match. Pollock discussed the Street Fight in his review, commenting that the "crowd was really hot for this match." As for the Last Man Standing match, Pollock said it "was an outstanding match." Pollock also felt that the main event got "zero time." Pollock noted that the fans in attendance started chanting "Fire Russo" during the Black Tie Brawl and Chain match in his review, which was a reference to TNA writer Vince Russo.

Wade Keller of the Pro Wrestling Torch Newsletter rated the matches out of five stars in his review of the event. He gave the main event 2 3/4 stars and discussed the amount of time it was given, stating it was "just enough time for a suitable main event" but that it did not "leave much flex time for things to run past the bare minimum for a PPV main event title match in a cage much less do whatever they're going to do with Sting and Nash." Keller also disapproved of unprotected use of weapons in the bout, commenting that TNA management needed to start fining "wrestlers for taking unprotected chairshots to the skull" because it was "just not worth the long-term cumulative risks associated with blunt trauma to the skull over years of wrestling." He gave the Last Man Standing bout 4 stars and said it was a "superb match" with a "scaring finish" since the "potential for something going wrong given Angle's legit neck problems was substantial" even if "everything was planned" to work out that way. Keller rated the Street Fight 1 1/2 stars and stated it "was pretty clunky late and early on the crowd brawling got a little repetitive" and that it felt "like yet another weapons match." "The match was okay, but nothing more. The tuxedos and chain served as more of a circus-like distraction than a valuable prop for the match", said Keller in his coverage of the Black Tie Brawl and Chain match, which he gave 1 1/4 stars. Keller gave the World Tag Team Championship match 2 stars, but did not give his opinion outside the rating on the contest. He did comment on the X Division Championship match, saying it was a "very good match" and gave it 3 stars.

James Caldwell, also of the Pro Wrestling Torch Newsletter, published a review of the show in which he also gave ratings out of 5 stars and some comments on the top matches on the card. He considered the main event "underwhelming" due to the "audience having sat through every possible gimmick match combination prior to another Joe-Booker bout that everyone knew was going to end with some sort of gimmicky finish" and that it was "not memorable" but that it would "generate talk about Jarrett." He gave the bout 2 stars. "That was an epic match", said Caldwell when discussing the Last Man Standing match. However, he felt the bout had a "silly pin-and-count-'em stipulation" and that the "all-too-real neck injury angle, followed by some post-match activity that took away from Styles's win." Caldwell felt the match made Styles look "like a star when he won, then he came across like a punk attacking Angle, then a fool being in position for Sting to take him out" but that he had a "memorable, star-making victory over Angle." He disapproved of Styles being "used a means to the end of explaining Sting's purpose-driven TNA life." Caldwell rated the encounter 4 stars. As for the Street Fight, he said it was a "fun brawl for the audience" and gave it 2 1/2 stars. Caldwell believed that the World Tag Team Championship match had "good heat" that "over-rode the stream of outside interference, referee incompetence, and overall over-booking" and that it was "refreshing to see TNA use an injury angle from TV to set-up the finish of an important PPV match." He gave the match 3 stars. The X Division Championship match was given 3 stars and he said it would have been "great" if it had avoided involving "outside interference."

== Aftermath ==
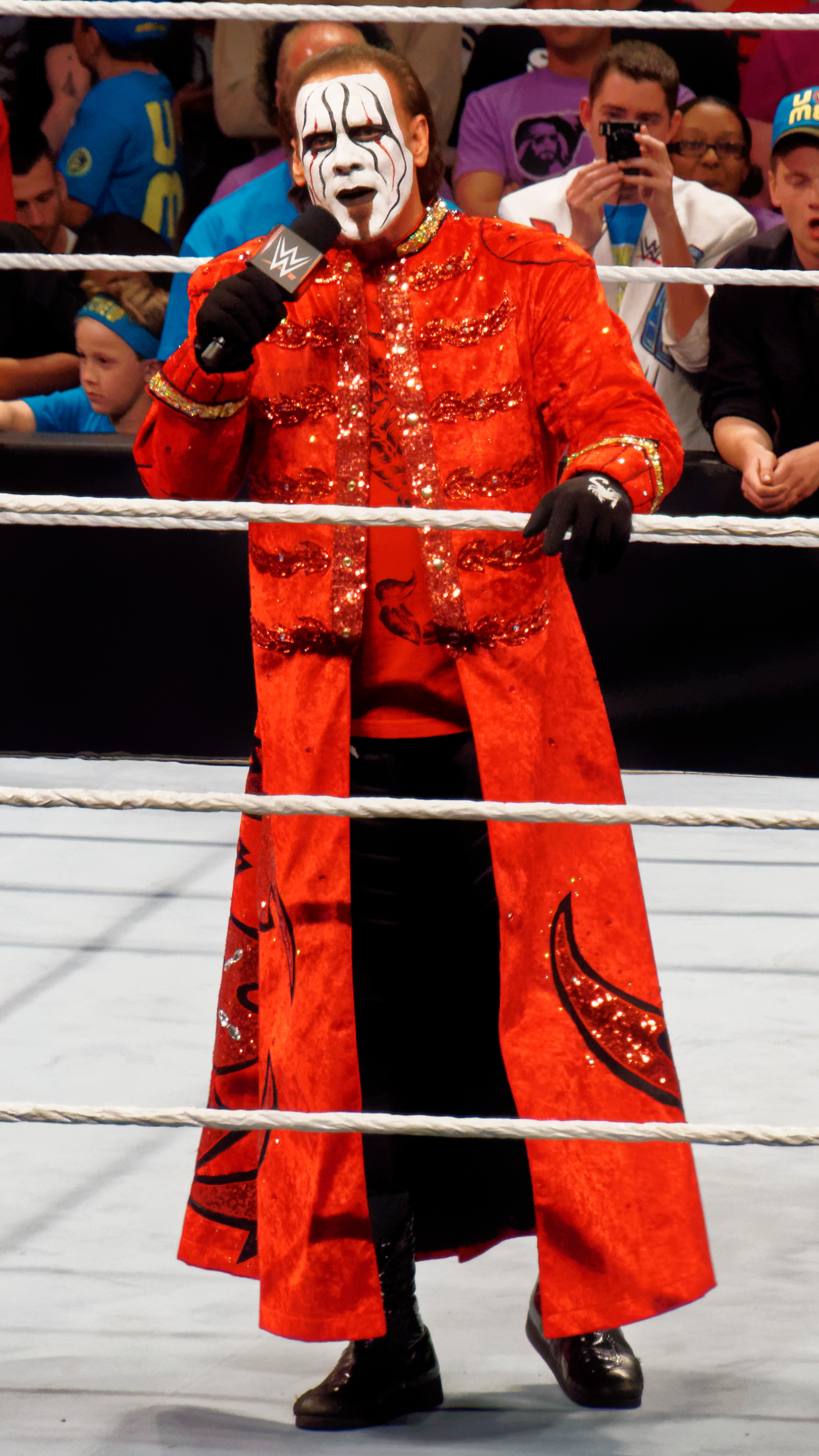
Sting (pictured in 2015) went on to win the TNA World Heavyweight Championship at Bound for Glory IV.

The feud between Samoa Joe and Booker T ended after Hard Justice. On the August 14 episode of TNA Impact!, Management Director Jim Cornette announced that Joe would defend the championship at TNA's next PPV event No Surrender on September 14 in a Four Ways to Glory match. Cornette stated that over the weeks leading to the show three qualification matches would take place to determine the challengers to Joe. Booker T won the first qualifying match was on the August 21 episode of Impact! by defeating Rhino. Kurt Angle defeated Kevin Nash on the August 28 episode of Impact! to qualify for the contest. The final qualifier was Christian Cage, who defeated A.J. Styles on the September 4 episode of Impact!. Booker T could not attend the event due to Hurricane Ike, making the bout a Three Ways to Glory match instead. Joe retained the championship at the show.

The finish to the main event and the segment after the Last Man Standing match led to several matches and segments following Hard Justice. Sting was announced at No Surrender to be the challenger for the TNA World Heavyweight Championship at TNA's Bound for Glory IV PPV event on October 12. Sting ended up defeating Joe for the title at the event due to Nash betraying and hitting Joe with a baseball bat. Styles went on to challenge Sting at TNA's Turning Point and Final Resolution PPV events for the title, failing to win on both occasions. These matches were part of a storyline between veterans wrestlers, which made up The Main Event Mafia, and younger wrestlers, called The TNA Front Line, in TNA. Meanwhile, the finish of the main event led to the return of Jeff Jarrett at No Surrender, when he aided Joe in retaining the TNA World Heavyweight Championship by hitting Angle with a guitar.

The rivalry between A.J. Styles and Kurt Angle continued after Hard Justice leading into No Surrender. On the August 14 episode of Impact!, Styles fought Angle in an Olympic Wrestling match for Angle's 1996 Summer Olympics gold medal in freestyle wrestling. Styles defeated Angle to win the medal on the telecast. Styles and Angle fought a week later on the August 21 episode of Impact! in a ladder match for the medal, with Styles retaining the medal. Styles then went on to feud with Angle's on-screen best friend Frank Trigg, who attacked Styles with a kendo stick during Styles' Four Ways to Glory qualification match with Cage, costing Styles to bout in the process. This led to Styles challenging Trigg to a bout at No Surrender, which Trigg agreed to but only if it was contested under Mixed Martial Arts rules on the September 11 episode of Impact!. Styles and Trigg fought to a no contest at No Surrender due to Styles accidentally hitting Trigg in the groin. Afterwards, Styles beat Trigg with a kendo stick to end their feud. On the September 25 episode of Impact!, Styles was ordered to return Angle's gold medal by Jeff Jarrett, who had taken a role as a TNA management authority figure. The medal was returned to Angle on the October 9 episode of Impact! by Jarrett.

Sonjay Dutt and Jay Lethal ended their rivalry at No Surrender. Dutt attacked Lethal after he was defeated by Sheik Abdul Bashir on the August 14 episode of Impact!. On the September 11 episode of Impact!, TNA promoted a Ladder of Love match at No Surrender with the winner becoming engaged to SoCal Val. Dutt won the contest at No Surrender when Val betrayed Lethal and aided Dutt. Beer Money, Inc (James Storm and Robert Roode) went on to defend the TNA World Tag Team Championship against The Latin American Xchange (Hernandez and Homicide) at No Surrender in a rematch. Beer Money, Inc retained the title at the show. Petey Williams defended the X Division Championship against Consequences Creed in a rematch on the August 21 episode of Impact!, with Bashir once again interfering by attacking Creed, resulting in Creed winning by disqualification and Williams retaining the X Division Championship. TNA promoted a Three Way match between the three for the X Division Championship for No Surrender, which Bashir ended up winning to become the new champion on the telecast. Team 3D (Brother Devon and Brother Ray) and the team of Christian Cage and Rhino ended their conflict after Hard Justice. Team 3D instead went on to fight the team of Abyss and Matt Morgan at No Surrender, which the latter won.

== Results ==
No.	Results	Stipulations	Times
1	Petey Williams (c) (with Rhaka Khan) defeated Consequences Creed	Singles match for the TNA X Division Championship	12:30
2	Gail Kim, ODB and Taylor Wilde defeated Awesome Kong and The Beautiful People (Angelina Love and Velvet Sky) (with Raisha Saeed)	Six-Knockout Tag Team match	11:27
3	Beer Money, Inc. (James Storm and Robert Roode) (with Jacqueline) defeated The Latin American Xchange (Hernandez and Homicide) (c) (with Héctor Guerrero and Salinas)	Tag Team match for the TNA World Tag Team Championship	14:15
4	Jay Lethal defeated Sonjay Dutt	Black Tie Brawl and Chain match	11:14
5	Christian Cage and Rhino defeated Team 3D (Brother Devon and Brother Ray)	New Jersey Street Fight	15:22
6	A.J. Styles defeated Kurt Angle	Last Man Standing match	24:50
7	Samoa Joe (c) defeated Booker T (with Sharmell)	Weaponized Six Sides of Steel Cage match for the TNA World Heavyweight Championship	12:44
(c) / – the champion(s) heading into the match
