= Victory Road (2008) =

2008 Total Nonstop Action Wrestling pay-per-view event

- Promotional poster for the event featuring Booker T and Samoa Joe
- Promotion: Total Nonstop Action Wrestling (TNA)
- Date: July 13, 2008
- City: Houston, Texas
- Venue: Reliant Arena
- Attendance: 3,000
- Tagline: "Houston, We Have a Problem"

Pay-per-view chronology
← Previous; Slammiversary	Next → Hard Justice

Victory Road chronology
← Previous; 2007	Next → 2009

The 2008 Victory Road was a professional wrestling pay-per-view (PPV) event produced by the Total Nonstop Action Wrestling (TNA) promotion that took place on July 13, 2008 at the Reliant Arena in Houston, Texas. It was the fourth event under the Victory Road name and the seventh event in the 2008 TNA PPV schedule. Eight professional wrestling matches were featured on the event's card, three of which were for championships.

The main event was for the TNA World Heavyweight Championship, in which the champion Samoa Joe defended the title against the challenger Booker T. The match ended in a no-contest after interference from Sting and various security personnel, thus causing Joe to retain the championship. A Six Man Tag Team Full Metal Mayhem match was also featured at Victory Road, pitting the team of A.J. Styles, Christian Cage, and Rhino against the team of Kurt Angle and Team 3D (Brother Devon and Brother Ray). Angle and Team 3D were the victors in the contest. The TNA World Tag Team Championship was defended in a "Fan's Revenge" Lumberjack match at the show, in which the champions The Latin American Xchange (Hernandez and Homicide) defeated Beer Money Incorporated. (James Storm and Robert Roode) to retain the title. The final two rounds of the 2008 TNA World X Cup Tournament took place at Victory Road. The third round featured a Four Team Twelve Man Elimination Tag Team match, which Team TNA won. The final round was a Four Way Ultimate X match, in which Team Mexico's Volador Jr. defeated Team International's Daivari, Team TNA's Kaz, and Team Japan's Naruki Doi.

Victory Road is remembered for the closing of the 2008 TNA World X Cup Tournament. 25,000 was the reported figure of purchasers for the event by the Wrestling Observer Newsletter. Victory Road had an attendance of 3,000 people. Bob Kapur of the professional wrestling section of the Canadian Online Explorer rated the show a 7 out of 10, which was lower than the 8 out of 10 given to the 2007 edition by Chris Sokol.

== Production ==
=== Background ===
The fourth installment under the Victory Road name was announced in January 2008 with a July 13 date attached. In May 2008, TNA hoped to host a PPV event in Houston, Texas by the end of the year, the earliest timeframe being late summer. TNA issued a press release in late-May 2008 revealing that Victory Road would be held at the Reliant Arena in Houston, Texas. Tickets for the show went on-sale on May 30. TNA released a poster to promote the event featuring the tagline "Houston, We Have a Problem" as well as Booker T and Samoa Joe. The final two rounds of the 2008 TNA World X Cup Tournament were scheduled to take place at Victory Road. An online vote commenced at the start of the show to select a stipulation for a Six Man Tag Team match promoted for the show. The choices were Falls Count Anywhere match, Tables match, or Full Metal Mayhem.

=== Storylines ===
Victory Road featured eight professional wrestling matches that involved different wrestlers from pre-existing scripted feuds and storylines. Wrestlers portrayed villains, heroes, or less distinguishable characters in the scripted events that built tension and culminated in a wrestling match or series of matches.

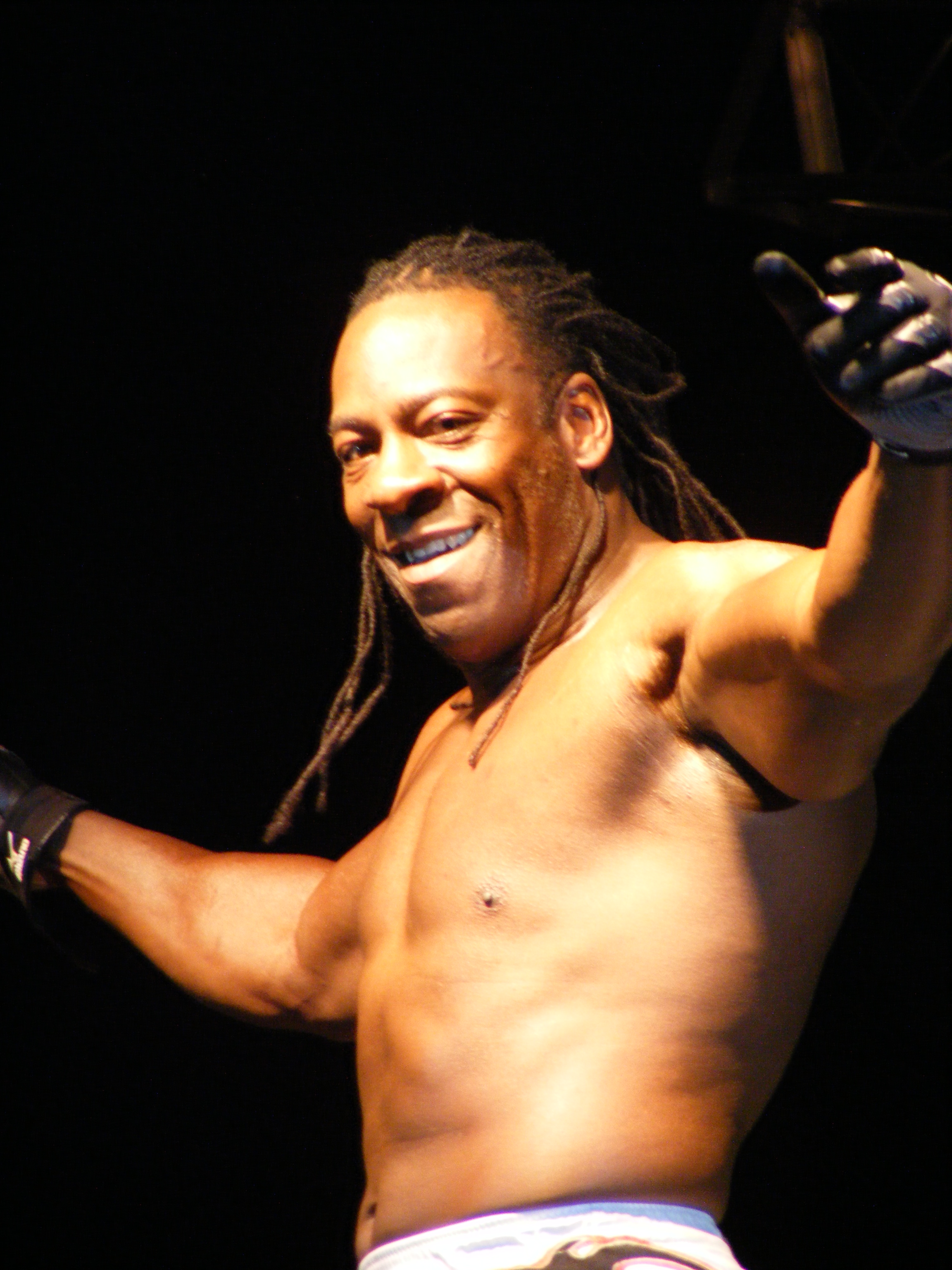
Booker T challenged Samoa Joe for the TNA World Heavyweight Championship at Victory Road.

The main event at Victory Road was for the TNA World Heavyweight Championship between then-champion Samoa Joe and the challenger Booker T. Joe and Booker T previously fought at TNA's Slammiversary PPV event on June 8 in a King of the Mountain match for the title, which Joe won to remain champion. On the June 12 episode of TNA's television program TNA Impact!, Booker T claimed that Joe did not beat him at the event due to interference from Joe's mentor Kevin Nash. This led to Nash stating that Joe could not beat Booker T in a one-on-one match. After this segment, Joe announced that Booker T and he would face at Victory Road for the title. Since Houston is Booker T's hometown, TNA promoted the match as him attempting to win the championship for the people of Houston. On the July 10 episode of Impact!, Sting proclaimed that he did not know which of the two would win at Victory Road, but that he would be there to watch.

The predominant storyline heading into the event was the rivalry between A.J. Styles and Kurt Angle, both members of The Angle Alliance. On the February 14 episode of Impact!, TNA held the scripted wedding of Angle's real-life wife Karen Angle and Styles despite Angle and Karen still being married on-screen. Afterwards, Karen and Angle separated in the storyline on the March 13 episode of Impact!. TNA continued to build the situation with Angle attempting to reconcile with Karen on the May 15 episode of Impact!. Karen refused Angle's request on the May 22 episode of Impact!, leading to Angle turning on and assaulting Styles later in the episode due to his jealousy of the affection Karen showed for Styles. This led to a match between the two at Slammiversary which Styles won after a distraction by Karen. The two faced in a Lumberjack match on the June 12 episode of Impact!, which Angle won before it ended in a brawl between Styles, Angle, Tomko, Christian Cage, Rhino, Abyss, and Team 3D (Brother Devon and Brother Ray). Afterwards, Team 3D and the team of Cage and Rhino became involved in the feud with Team 3D joining Angle, while Cage and Rhino sided with Styles. Team 3D then injured both Cage and Rhino in the narrative, with Rhino being knocked out on the June 19 episode of Impact!, while on the June 26 episode of Impact! Cage was slammed through a glass table by Brother Ray. Rhino returned from injury on the July 3 episode of Impact!, challenging Team 3D and Angle to a Six Man Tag Team match at Victory Road, while teasing at adding Full Metal Mayhem rules to the bout. TNA promoted the match for the event afterwards.

The conclusion to the 2008 TNA World X Cup Tournament was held at Victory Road with two matches completing the final two rounds. The World X Cup was a tournament consisting of teams competing against each other for points. There were four teams each made up of four men, with three teams representing a country and one representing TNA. These teams were Team TNA (Alex Shelley, Chris Sabin, Curry Man, and Kazarian), Team Japan (Masato Yoshino, Milano Collection A.T., Naruki Doi, and Puma), Team Mexico (Averno, Rey Bucanero, Último Guerrero, and Volador Jr.), and Team International (Alex Koslov, Daivari, Doug Williams, and Tyson Dux). The World X Cup began on the June 19 episode of Impact!, with round one being tag team matches worth one point each. Round one concluded on the June 26 episode of Impact!. Round two was standard wrestling matches worth two points each on the July 3 and July 10 episodes of Impact!. The fourth round was announced on the June 19 episode of Impact! to take place at Victory Road in an Ultimate X match. The Wrestling Observer Newsletter reported that the third round of the tournament would be a multi-man team elimination match consisting of the wrestlers not competing in the fourth round.

The TNA World Tag Team Championship was defended in a "Fan's Revenge" Lumberjack match by The Latin American Xchange (Hernandez and Homicide; LAX) against James Storm and Robert Roode. On the June 12 episode of Impact!, Roode and Storm teamed to face LAX for the World Tag Team Championship. The match was originally won by Roode and Storm before being restarted due to interference. LAX won the restart to retain the championship. After the bout, Roode and Storm assaulted LAX and their manager Héctor Guerrero. Management Director Jim Cornette scheduled a title defense at Victory Road between LAX and Roode and Storm under "Fan's Revenge" Lumberjack rules on the June 19 episode of Impact!. TNA announced on the June 26 episode of Impact! that a contest was being held with the winner getting a free trip to participate in the match as a lumberjack.

== Event ==
=== Miscellaneous ===
Victory Road featured employees other than the wrestlers involved in the matches. Mike Tenay and Don West were the commentators for the telecast, with Frank Trigg providing commentary for the Full Metal Mayhem match only. Jeremy Borash and David Penzer were ring announcers for the event. Andrew Thomas, Earl Hebner, Rudy Charles, and Mark "Slick" Johnson participated as referees for the encounters. Lauren Thompson and Borash were used as interviewers during the event. Besides employees who appeared in a wrestling role, Velvet Sky, SoCal Val, Héctor Guerrero, Salinas, Jackie Moore, Raisha Saeed, Abyss, Johnny Devine, Sharmell, and Sting all appeared on camera, either in backstage or in ringside segments.

=== Preliminary matches ===
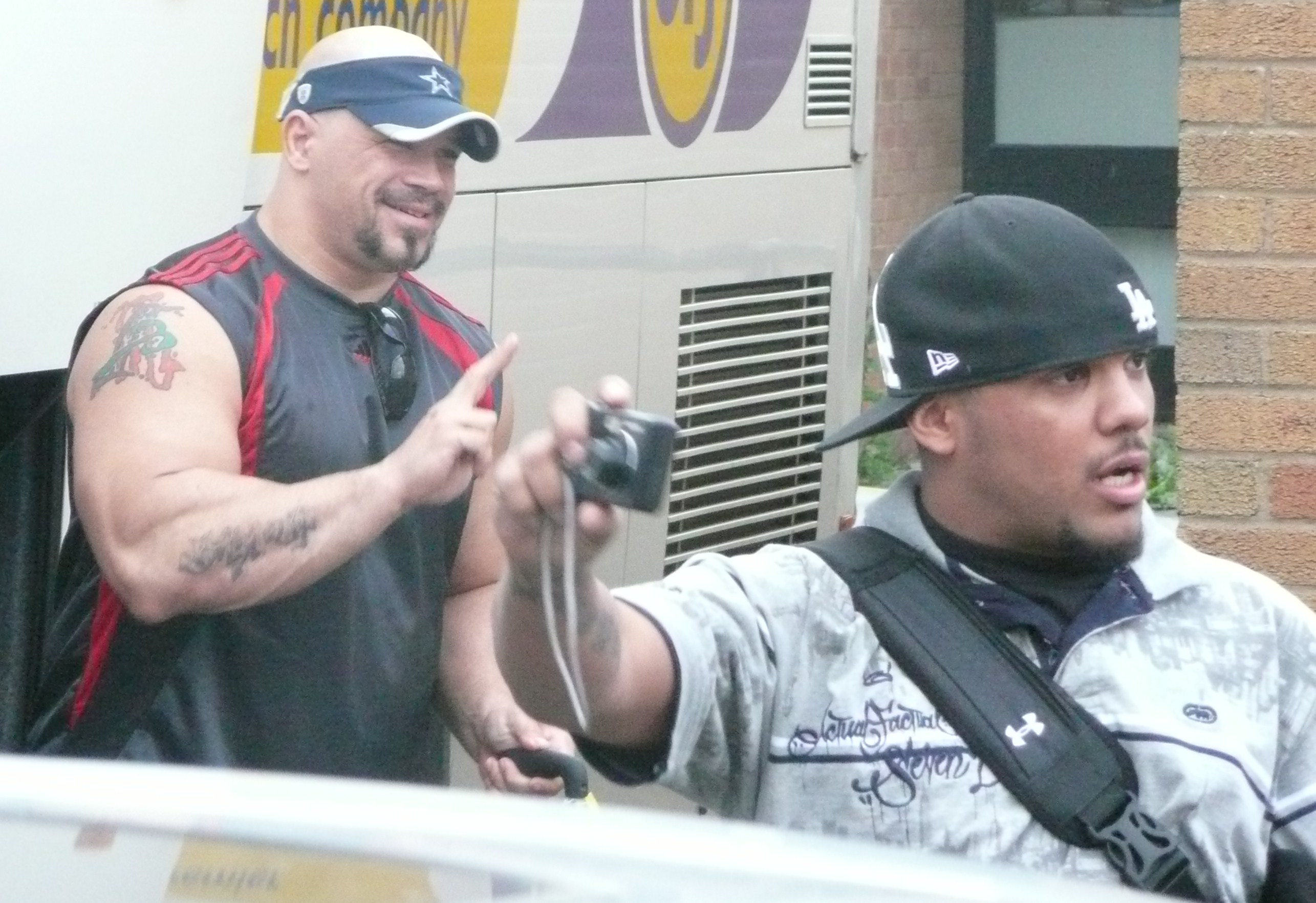
The Latin American Xchange (Hernandez [left] and Homicide [right]) successfully defended the TNA World Tag Team Championship at Victory Road.

The show opened with the third round of the 2008 TNA World X Cup Tournament. It was a Four Team Twelve Man Elimination Tag Team match between Alex Shelley, Chris Sabin, and Curry Man of Team TNA, Masato Yoshino, Milano Collection A.T., and Puma of Team Japan, Averno, Rey Bucanero, and Último Guerrero of Team Mexico, and Alex Koslov, Doug Williams, and Tyson Dux of Team International. The bout lasted 24 minutes and 16 seconds. The rules of this encounter involved only two wrestlers in the ring at all times, with any member of any team being allowed to tag in at any time. Members of each team were eliminated until only one team remained, that team was considered the winner and earned three points in the World X Cup. The match came down to Shelley of Team TNA and Yoshino of Team Japan. Shelley won the bout by pinning Yoshino after forcing Yoshino back-first onto the mat with his signature Automatic Midnight maneuver.

The second match pitted Gail Kim against Angelina Love. Love was accompanied to the ring by Velvet Sky. The duration of the match was 6 minutes and 13 seconds. Early in the bout, Kim held Love in a Figure-Four Leglock submission hold around a ringpost, which she was forced to release by the referee. Later, Kim slammed Love back-first onto the mat with her signature Happy Ending maneuver and followed with the pinfall for the win.

Sonjay Dutt fought Jay Lethal in the next bout on the card. Lethal was accompanied to the ring by SoCal Val. The contest lasted 8 minutes and 24 seconds. Dutt was the victor in the encounter by using a roll-up pinning maneuver on Lethal while he was distracted by Val.

The TNA World Tag Team Championship was defended in a "Fan's Revenge" Lumberjack match by LAX against James Storm and Robert Roode—now known as Beer Money Incorporated—in the fourth match of the show. LAX were accompanied to the ring by Salinas and Héctor Guerrero, while Storm and Roode were accompanied by Jackie Moore. In a "Fan's Revenge" Lumberjack match, people are chosen from the audience to take part in the encounter by standing around the ring with straps, in which their primary purpose is to make sure all the participants remain in the ring. If the participants do not remain in the ring, then the fans that are chosen are supposed to hit them with the straps until they re-enter. Roode was whipped twice during the encounter; the first when he was thrown to the ringside area, while the second was when he fell to the outside. LAX won the match at 10 minutes and 6 seconds when Hernandez pinned Roode following LAX's signature 5150 tag team maneuver.

The TNA Women's Knockout Championship was defended by Taylor Wilde against Awesome Kong next in a bout that lasted 4 minutes and 51 seconds. Kong was accompanied by Raisha Saeed to the ring. Wilde won the match with a victory roll pin on Kong to retain the championship. After the bout, Kong and Saeed assaulted Wilde until Abyss came to her defense.

=== Main event matches ===
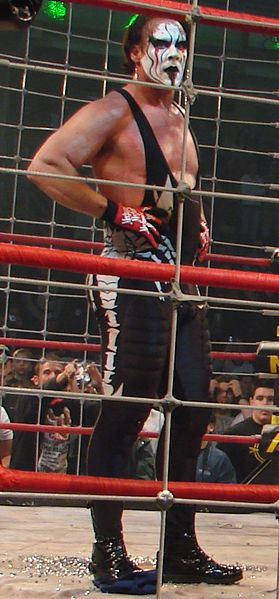
Sting interfered in the main event at Victory Road.

The fourth and final round of the 2008 TNA World X Cup Tournament was next involving one member of each respective team in a Four Way Ultimate X match. The encounter was between Daivari of Team International, Kaz of Team TNA, Naruki Doi of Team Japan, and Volador Jr. of Team Mexico. In an Ultimate X match, two steel cables are attached to four steel supports in such a way that they form an "X" above the ring. At the center of this "X" an item is hung, which must be retrieved by a participant to win the match. In this bout, the item hanging above the ring was an enlarged red "X" which symbolized four points in the World X Cup. During the encounter, Kaz ascended one of the steel supports before jumping off towards the center of the ring and slamming his leg onto Daivari, who was holding onto the cables. This action forced both of them to fall and crash onto the ring mat below. Afterwards, Volador Jr ascended the cables and retrieved the "X" to win the match and four points for Team Mexico at 10 minutes and 58 seconds. With this victory, Team Mexico won the 2008 TNA World X Cup Tournament with seven points, compared to six by Team TNA, and three by Team Japan and Team International, respectively. Team Mexico were awarded a trophy for their victory after the bout by Mike Tenay and TNA Spanish commentator Willie Urbina.

A Six Man Tag Team Full Metal Mayhem match followed pitting the team of Kurt Angle and Team 3D against A.J. Styles, Christian Cage, and Rhino. The duration of the contest was 15 minutes and 55 seconds. In this bout, the only way to win was by pinfall or submission, all weapons were legal and encouraged, and there were no disqualifications. Cage ascended the steel supports left behind from the Ultimate X match during the bout to jump off in an aerial splash onto both members of Team 3D and Angle. Each participant of the match was forced through a table during the bout except Angle. Rhino was the first by Team 3D, followed by Cage also by Team 3D. Each member of Team 3D were then forced through a table by Styles. After this, Johnny Devine interfered in the encounter on Team 3D's behalf by attempting to hit Styles with a kendo stick, only to be kicked in the head by Styles. Later, Styles laid Angle on a table and ascended a ladder. At this time, Frank Trigg interfered by hitting Styles over the head with the kendo stick, allowing Angle to force Styles through the set-up table with his signature Olympic Slam maneuver for the pinfall victory.

The main event was for the TNA World Heavyweight Championship, in which then-champion Samoa Joe defended the title against the challenger Booker T. Joe's forehead was cut open during the match after being thrown into a pair of steel ring steps. Booker T also had his forehead cut open during the contest. Several referees were knocked out by Joe in the storyline throughout the encounter, to the point that security was sent down to the ring to restrain Joe. Booker T's legitimate wife Sharmell then interfered in the bout, attempting to get someone to stop Joe as he applied his signature Coquina Clutch submission hold on Booker T. Sting then entered the arena and went to the ring to calm down Joe, who listened at first, before giving Sting the finger and continuing his assault on Booker T. Sting retaliated by bashing Joe in the gut and over the back with a baseball bat. Booker T then covered Joe, while Sharmell counted the pinfall before the two left the arena with the title belt, leaving the outcome a mystery before being ruled a no-contest at 15 minutes and 14 seconds.

== Reception ==
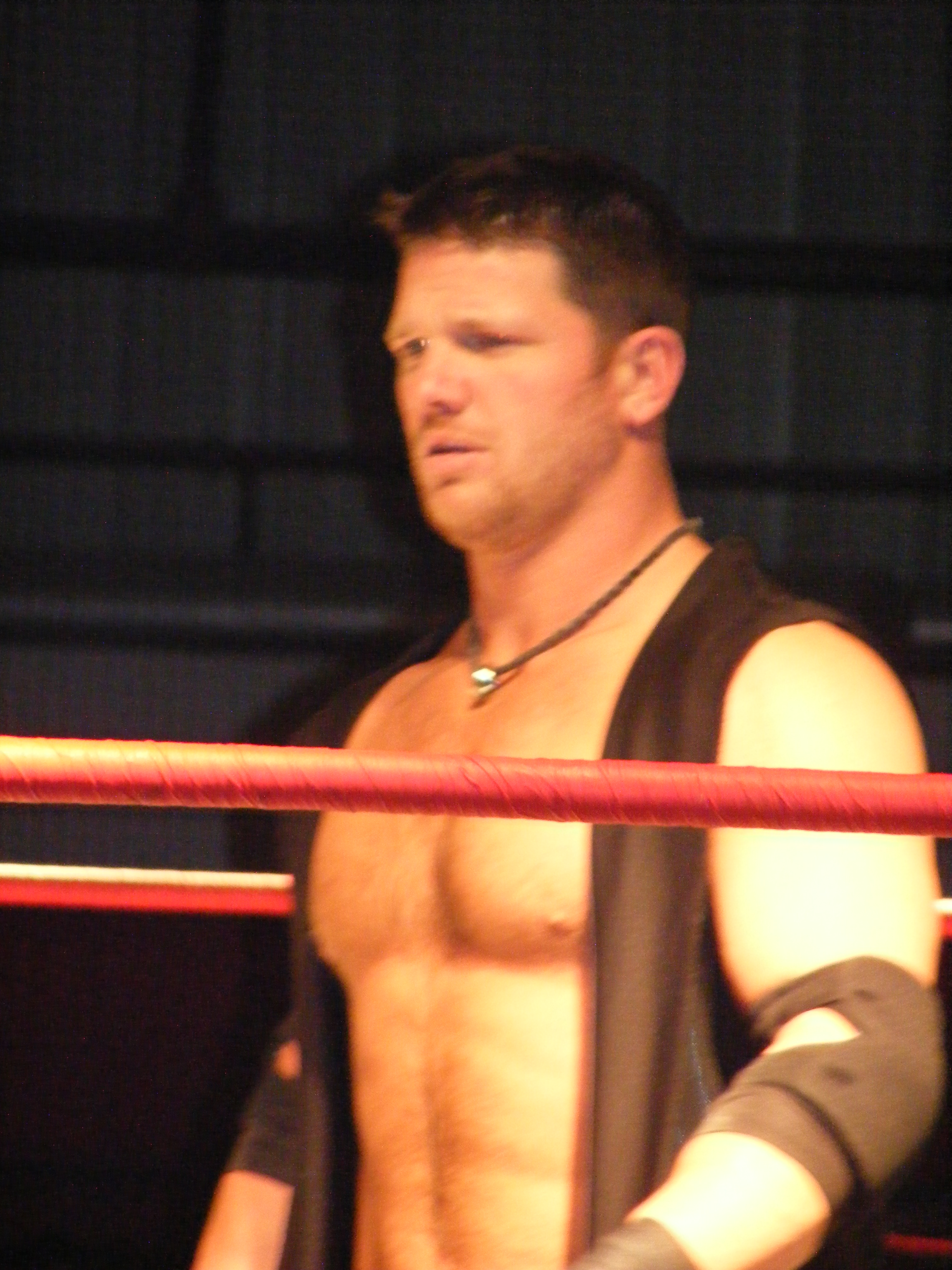
A.J. Styles (pictured) received a "superstar pop coming out to the ring" from the audience that "carried on throughout the match" according to Pro Wrestling Torch Newsletter contributor James Caldwell, who attended the event.

A total of 3,000 people attended Victory Road, while The Wrestling Observer Newsletter reported that 25,000 people bought the event. Canadian Online Explorer writer Bob Kapur rated the entire event a 7 out of 10, which was lower than the 8 out of 10 given to the 2007 edition by Chris Sokol. The 7 out of 10 was higher than the 5 out of 10 given to the 2009 edition by Chris and Bryan Sokol. Victory Road's rating was the same as the one received by Slammiversary the month prior by Jon Waldman. Compared to rival World Wrestling Entertainment's (WWE) The Great American Bash PPV event on July 20, Victory Road fared better as The Great American Bash received a 6 out of 10 from Dave Hillhouse.

Kapur discussed in his review how the main event of a show can impact the rest of the event. He stated that "a confusing, overbooked fustercluck" main event, such as the one at Victory Road, "can leave a bad taste in your mouth after it’s over, even if everything else was pretty solid." He went on to say that based on the crowd reaction the "finish seemed to dampen the enthusiasm of what was otherwise a really good show," and that it was "unfortunate, because everything leading up to that point was good to great." Kapur gave the main event a 3 out of 10, while the Full Metal Mayhem match and the World Tag Team Championship both received a 7 out of 10. The third round of the 2008 TNA World X Cup Tournament was given a 9 out of 10, while the final round received an 8 out of 10.

Wade Keller of the Pro Wrestling Torch Newsletter reviewed the event. He felt the main event had a "good start to what might have been a decent match" but stated that it was "far from a satisfying finish" for the price. Keller felt the Full Metal Mayhem bout was a "clustermess of a match," but at the same time was "entertaining start to finish." As for the World Tag Team Championship match, he said that it felt "anticlimactic" and that having the fans at ringside was more of a "distraction" than a "payoff." Regarding the World X Cup, Keller said the third round bout was a dream match for some with "lots of cool spots from start to finish," but that it had "little context early" and was more just a "bunch of spots." He also said that the "last ten minutes was better without as many people tagging in and out somewhat indiscriminately." As for the final round, Keller commented that "it had some spectacular (and ridiculously dangerous looking) spots," but that it ended up "feeling short for a match of that caliber."

James Caldwell, also of the Pro Wrestling Torch Newsletter, reviewed the show live from the arena. He said the main event had a "terrible terrible finish" which "killed the crowd." He also commented that it was one of the "worst finishes" he had "ever seen." Caldwell stated that the Full Metal Mayhem match had "lots of crazy spots" and that A.J. Styles received a "superstar pop coming out to the ring" from the audience that "carried on throughout the match". He felt the World Tag Team Championship match was an "OK tag match." As for the World X Cup, Caldwell stated that the third round bout was "entertaining yet quite long" and that the "crowd was super into Sabin and Shelley." He also said that after the match settled into "one-on-one action" it "turned into a pretty good match." The final round was seen by Caldwell as "one of those rinse and repeat spot fest matches until Kaz busted out the big double foot stomp on Daivari that popped the crowd." Overall, he called it a "one spot match."

== Aftermath ==
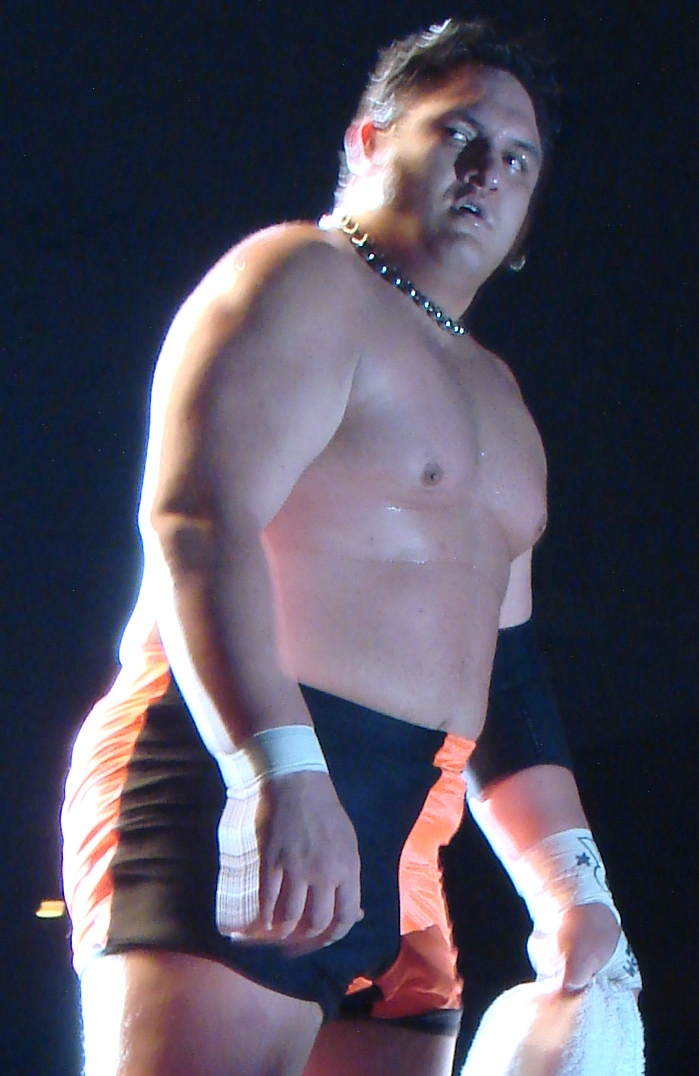
Samoa Joe (pictured) defeated Booker T at Hard Justice to retain the TNA World Heavyweight Championship

Brother Devon injured his ankle during the Full Metal Mayhem match, while Kaz injured his hip due to his jump during the Ultimate X match. Devon was later diagnosed with a deep sprain of the Achilles tendon.

Everyone used as lumberjacks in the TNA World Tag Team Championship bout were legitimate fans from the Houston area, while only the national winner from the promoted contest was not from Houston.

After Victory Road, Samoa Joe and Booker T continued their rivalry over the TNA World Heavyweight Championship. On the July 17 episode of Impact, Management Director Jim Cornette demanded that Booker T give the championship back to Joe, who was recognized as the official champion by TNA. Booker T refused this demand, while Joe also declined the offer as he felt he did not deserve to hold the title due to being pinned at the event. Due to these feelings, Cornette instead scheduled a rematch between the two for the championship at TNA's next PPV event Hard Justice on August 10. On the July 24 episode of Impact!, Joe challenged Booker T to contest their rematch in a Six Sides of Steel Cage match, which Booker T accepted after adding that weapons would be allowed in the match. Joe defeated Booker T at Hard Justice to retain the championship.

A.J. Styles and Kurt Angle went on to face each other in a Last Man Standing match at Hard Justice. This bout was announced on the July 31 episode of Impact!, when Styles challenged Angle to a match at Hard Justice to end their rivalry. This was due to Angle assaulting Styles from behind earlier in the episode. Styles defeated Angle at the event.

On the July 31 episode of Impact!, Team 3D cost Cage and Rhino the chance to become the number one contenders to the TNA World Tag Team Championship in a match against Beer Money Incorporated. After the match, Cage challenged Team 3D to a New Jersey Street Fight at Hard Justice, which Team 3D accepted. Cage and Rhino were the victors in the contest at the event.

The TNA World Tag Team Championship went on to be defended by LAX at Hard Justice against Beer Money Incorporated. On the July 31 episode of Impact!, Beer Money Incorporated defeated Cage and Rhino to become the number one contenders to the TNA World Tag Team Championship. On the August 7 episode of Impact!, Beer Money Incorporated forced Homicide through a glass table, injuring his eye in the storyline. Beer Money Incorporated defeated LAX to win the TNA World Tag Team Championship at the event.

After Victory Road, Sonjay Dutt and Jay Lethal had another match at Hard Justice, this time the match was promoted as Black Tie Brawl and Chain match. Lethal won the encounter at the event. Also featured at Hard Justice was a Six Woman Tag Team match, pitting the team of Gail Kim, Taylor Wilde, and ODB against the team of Awesome Kong and The Beautiful People (Angelina Love and Velvet Sky). The team of Kim, Wilde, and ODB were the victors of the contest at the show.

In October 2017, with the launch of the Global Wrestling Network, the event became available to stream on demand.

== Results ==
No.	Results	Stipulations	Times
1	Team TNA (Alex Shelley, Chris Sabin and Curry Man) defeated Team Japan (Masato Yoshino, Milano Collection A.T. and Puma), Team Mexico (Averno, Rey Bucanero and Último Guerrero), and Team International (Alex Koslov, Doug Williams and Tyson Dux)^{1}	X Division Four Team Twelve Man Elimination Tag Team match; Third Round of the 2008 TNA World X Cup Tournament	24:16
2	Gail Kim defeated Angelina Love (with Velvet Sky)	Singles match	6:13
3	Sonjay Dutt defeated Jay Lethal (with SoCal Val)	Singles match	8:24
4	The Latin American Xchange (Hernandez and Homicide) (c) (with Héctor Guerrero and Salinas) defeated Beer Money, Inc. (James Storm and Robert Roode) (with Jackie Moore)	"Fan's Revenge" Lumberjack match for the TNA World Tag Team Championship	10:06
5	Taylor Wilde (c) defeated Awesome Kong (with Raisha Saeed)	Singles match for the TNA Women's Knockout Championship	4:51
6	Volador Jr. defeated Daivari, Kaz, and Naruki Doi	Ultimate X match; Final Round of the 2008 TNA World X Cup Tournament	10:58
7	Kurt Angle and Team 3D (Brother Devon and Brother Ray) defeated A.J. Styles, Christian Cage, and Rhino	Full Metal Mayhem match	15:55
8	Samoa Joe (c) vs. Booker T ended in a no contest	Singles match for the TNA World Heavyweight Championship	15:14
(c) / – the champion(s) heading into the match

World X Cup Elimination match

1.

Elimination No.	Team	Eliminated	Eliminator	Duration
1	Team International	Tyson Dux	Rey Bucanero	2:55
2	Team Japan	Puma	Averno	5:04
3	Team Japan	Milano Collection A.T.	Chris Sabin	7:02
4	Team Mexico	Averno	Masato Yoshino	10:27
5	Team TNA	Curry Man	Último Guerrero	12:51
6	Team International	Doug Williams	Rey Bucanero	13:23
7	Team Mexico	Último Guerrero	Alex Koslov	15:09
8	Team Mexico	Rey Bucanero	Chris Sabin	16:12
9	Team TNA	Chris Sabin	Alex Koslov	19:06
10	Team International	Alex Koslov	Masato Yoshino	20:34
11	Team Japan	Masato Yoshino	Alex Shelley	24:16
