= ACW Great American Championship =

Professional wrestling championship

Details
- Promotion: Assault Championship Wrestling
- Date established: November 30, 2001
- Date retired: March 21, 2004
Statistics
- First champion(s): Jeff Rocker
- Final champion(s): Tony DeVito
- Most reigns: Jeff Rocker (2 reigns); Johnny Thunder (2 reigns); Slyk Wagner Brown (2 reigns)
- Longest reign: Tony DeVito (287 days)
- Shortest reign: Johnny Thunder (28 days)

The ACW Great American Championship was a secondary professional wrestling championship title in the American independent promotion Assault Championship Wrestling. The first champion was "The Machine" Jeff Rocker who won the title from Mercenary in Meriden, Connecticut on November 30, 2001. The championship was regularly defended throughout the state of Connecticut, most often in Meriden, Connecticut, until the promotion closed in early 2004.

Jeff Rocker, "Lightning" Johnny Thunder and Slyk Wagner Brown hold the record for most reigns, each having won the title twice. At 287 days, Tony DeVito's reign is the longest in the title's history. Johnny Thunder second reign, which lasted 28 days, was the shortest in the history of the title. Overall, there have been 9 reigns shared between 6 wrestlers, with two vacancies.

== Title history ==
| # | Order in reign history |
| Reign | The reign number for the specific set of wrestlers listed |
| Event | The event in which the title was won |
| — | Used for vacated reigns so as not to count it as an official reign |
| N/A | The information is not available or is unknown |
| + | Indicates the current reign is changing daily |

=== Reigns ===
| # | Wrestlers | Reign | Date | Days held | Location | Event | Notes | Ref. |
|---|---|---|---|---|---|---|---|---|
| 1 | Jeff Rocker | 1 | November 30, 2001 | 120 | Meriden, Connecticut | Live event | Defeated Mercenary to become the first ACW Great American Champion. | |
| 2 | Johnny Thunder | 1 | March 30, 2002 | 71 | Meriden, Connecticut | Live event | | |
| 3 | Jeff Rocker | 2 | June 9, 2002 | 42 | Meriden, Connecticut | Live event | | |
| 4 | Bull Dredd | 1 | July 21, 2002 | 34 | Waterbury, Connecticut | Live event | | |
| 5 | Slyk Wagner Brown | 1 | August 24, 2002 | 71 | Meriden, Connecticut | Live event | | |
| 6 | Johnny Thunder | 2 | November 3, 2002 | 28 | New Britain, Connecticut | Live event | | |
| 7 | Slyk Wagner Brown | 2 | December 1, 2002 | N/A | New Britain, Connecticut | Live event | | |
| — | Vacated | — | December 2002 | — | Meriden, Connecticut | N/A | The championship is vacated when Slyk Wagner Brown is stripped of the title. | |
| 8 | Homicide | 1 | March 14, 2003 | 48-78 | East Hartford, Connecticut | Live event | Defeated Jeff Rocker to win vacant title. | |
| — | Vacated | — | May 2003 | — | Meriden, Connecticut | N/A | The championship is vacated when Homicide is stripped of the title. | |
| 9 | Tony DeVito | 1 | June 8, 2003 | 287 | Waterbury, Connecticut | Live event | Defeated Jeff Rocker in tournament final to win vacant title. | |
| — | Deactivated | — | March 21, 2004 | — | N/A | N/A | ACW holds its last show on March 21, 2004. | |

== Combined reigns ==
| # | Wrestlers | Reign | Combined days |
|---|---|---|---|
| 1 | Tony DeVito | 1 | 287 |
| 2 | Jeff Rocker | 2 | 162 |
| 3 | Johnny Thunder | 2 | 99 |
| 4 | Slyk Wagner Brown | 2 | 71-101 |
| 5 | Homicide | 1 | 48-78 |
| 6 | Bull Dredd | 1 | 34 |
