= Tony DeVito =

American professional wrestler (born 1972)

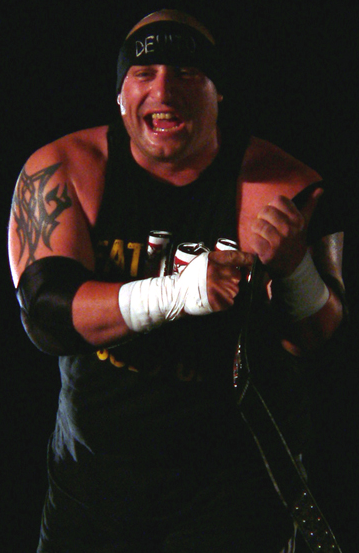
- DeVito in 2005

Personal information
- Born: Anthony DeVito; January 20, 1972 (age 54) Yonkers, New York, U.S.
- Children: 2

Professional wrestling career
- Ring name(s): DeVito; Bobby DeVito; Macho Libre; Tony DeVito
- Billed height: 5 ft 8 in (173 cm)
- Billed weight: 225 lb (102 kg)
- Billed from: "Fordham Road, The Bronx"
- Trained by: David Schultz
- Debut: 1991
- Retired: December 27, 2025

Anthony DeVito (born January 20, 1972) is an American retired professional wrestler, better known as Tony DeVito or simply DeVito. He is best known for his appearances with Extreme Championship Wrestling as part of Da Baldies and with Ring of Honor as part of the Carnage Crew.

== Professional wrestling career ==
=== Early career (1991–1999) ===
DeVito was trained by David Schultz and debuted in 1991.

In 1992, DeVito worked as an enhancement talent for WWF until 1997, losing to the likes of Mr. Perfect, Bam Bam Bigelow, Doink the Clown, Shawn Michaels, Phantasio and The Rock.

After leaving the company in 1997, he began working on the independent circuit. In the late-1990s, DeVito appeared with promotions in the Northeastern United States such as Jersey All Pro Wrestling and Northeast Wrestling.

=== Extreme Championship Wrestling (1999–2000) ===
In 1999, DeVito joined Extreme Championship Wrestling as a part of a faction called "Da Baldies" with Angel, Vito Lograsso, P. N. News, Vic Grimes and Redd Dogg. The characteristics of Da Baldies were that of bald headed thugs. DeVito and Angel feuded with Axl Rotten and Balls Mahoney, and then with New Jack. At ECW Guilty as Charged, Da Baldies were "hired" to attack the team of Christian York and Joey Matthews, as well as Justin Credible and Steve Corino. DeVito made his final appearances with ECW in December 2000, after which he wrestled sporadically on the independent circuit.

=== Ring of Honor (2002–2005) ===
In April 2002, DeVito joined the nascent Ring of Honor promotion, where he formed a tag team with his long-time friend Loc known as the "Carnage Crew". The Carnage Crew was later expanded to include Masada, and then again to include Justin Credible. Credible left ROH in 2004, while Masada became a villain by betraying DeVito and Loc on May 22, 2004.

DeVito and Loc feuded with Special K, then with B. J. Whitmer and Dan Maff. After Maff left ROH, they began feuding with Whitmer and his new partner, Jimmy Jacobs. The Carnage Crew defeated Whitmer and Jacobs for the ROH Tag Team Championship on July 9, 2005, but lost it to Whitmer and Jacobs on July 23, 2005.

DeVito made his final appearances with Ring of Honor in September 2005.

=== Late career (2005–2025) ===
DeVito left Ring of Honor in June 2005 and went into semi-retirement, making occasional appearances on the independent circuit.

DeVito made two appearances with World Wrestling Entertainment (formerly the World Wrestling Federation) in mid-2006. On the June 20, 2006 episode of ECW on Sci Fi, DeVito appeared as Macho Libre (a parody reference to both Jack Black's titular character from the film Nacho Libre and "Macho Man" Randy Savage), losing to The Sandman in a squash match. On the July 4 episode of ECW on Sci Fi, DeVito reappeared as a faux preacher who verbally rallied against ECW until being attacked and chased from ringside by The Sandman.

On November 15, 2016, DeVito opened his own wrestling school. He retired from ring competition on December 27, 2025.

== Professional wrestling style and persona ==
DeVito's signatures moves include the "Bronx Bomb" (a sitdown side slam) and the "F-U Moonsault" (a split-legged moonsault).

== Personal life ==
DeVito is married with two children.

== Championships and accomplishments ==
- Assault Championship Wrestling
  - ACW Great American Championship (1 time, final)
- Atomic Legacy Wrestling
  - ALW Hardcore Championship (3 times)
  - ALW Tag Team Championship (1 time) - with CJ O'Doyle
- Eastern States Wrestling
  - ESW Light Heavyweight Championship (1 time)
- Go Wrestling
  - GW Powerweight Championship (1 time)
- Massachusetts Wrestling Association
  - MWA Tag Team Championship (1 time) - with Nick Barberi
- Millennium Wrestling Association

- MWA Hardcore Championship (1 time)

- NEWF
  - NEWF Television Championship (1 time)
- New Breed Wrestling
  - NBW Tag Team Championship (1 time) – with Big Guido
  - NBW Television Championship (1 time)
  - NBW United States Championship (1 time)
- NWA Northeast
  - NWA Northeast Television Championship (1 time)
- Renegade Wrestling Federation
  - RWF Heavyweight Championship (1 time)
- Ring of Honor
  - ROH Tag Team Championship (1 time) – with H. C. Loc
