= Ostrosky =

Ostrosky is a surname. Notable people with the surname include:

- Beth Ostrosky Stern (born 1972), American actress, author, model, and animal rights activist
- David Ostrosky (1956–2023), Mexican actor
