= Dinner and a Movie =

Television series

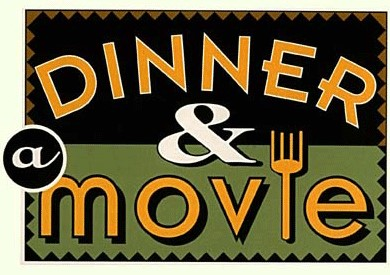
- Genre: Movies; Cooking show
- Presented by: Claud Mann; Paul Gilmartin; Annabelle Gurwitch (1996–2002); Lisa Kushell (2002–2005); Janet Varney (2005–2011); Jason Biggs (2024–); Jenny Mollen (2024–)
- Opening theme: "Beans and Corn Bread" by Louis Jordan and Tympany Five
- Country of origin: United States
- Original language: English

Production
- Production location: United States
- Running time: 90 minutes
- Production company: Studio T

Original release
- Network: TBS
- Release: September 8, 1995 – 2011
- Release: June 1, 2024 – present

Dinner and a Movie is an American cooking and entertainment television program which first aired on TBS from September 8, 1995 to 2011, and it made its return in 2024.

The show was hosted by chef Claud Mann and comedian Paul Gilmartin throughout its run, as well as Annabelle Gurwitch from 1996–2002, Kent Osborne in 1998 before hosting its "Movie Lounge" spin-off, Lisa Kushell from 2002–2005 and Janet Varney from 2005 to the show's end in 2011.

== Format ==
Each episode included a movie and the preparation of a creative dinner to go with its theme, generally via a pun. For example, an episode showing Drumline features a recipe titled "The Beets Go On", referencing the Sonny & Cher single "The Beat Goes On", as well as the plot of the movie about a drummer who tries to fit in with a new marching band. However, some episodes have special guests like Kelsey Grammer in showing of Stripes, Jerry Springer in showing of Dumb and Dumber, and Richard Petty in showing of Days of Thunder.

Cookbooks based on the block were released in 1996, 1999, and 2003.

Monkey-ed Movies debuted in production which were run during the block and in odd time slots after sporting events like a minor golf tournament a day then, the station played about half an hour to unexpected results. The ratings actually increased, which prompted 13 episodes of an expanded half-hour series which would become The Chimp Channel.

The show's cancellation was announced by Gilmartin on the May 6 edition of his podcast, The Mental Illness Happy Hour.

== Revival ==
On May 17, 2023, Kathleen Finch, Chairman and Chief Content Officer of Warner Bros. Discovery’s U.S. Networks Group, announced that it would revive the block during the company’s upfront presentation in New York City.

On May 17, 2024, it was announced that Jason Biggs and his wife Jenny Mollen were chosen as hosts, and that the revival would debut on June 1 with the premiere of Aquaman.

All episodes of the reboot hosts special guests such as Nelson Ascencio in showing of The Hunger Games, Tonia Haddix with her podcast cohost Amber Renee Cunningham in showing of Kong: Skull Island, and Mark L. Young in showing of We're the Millers.

== Films shown by Claud and Paul ==
- Mars Attacks!
- The Breakfast Club
- Fast Times at Ridgemont High
- The Blue Lagoon
- Weird Science
- The Money Pit
- The Blues Brothers
- National Lampoon's Animal House
- Grease
- Police Academy
- The Lost Boys
- Urban Cowboy
- Heathers
- The Cutting Edge
- A View to a Kill
- Honey, I Shrunk the Kids
- The Living Daylights
- A Flintstones Christmas Carol
- A Christmas Carol
- Airplane!
- Wildcats
- The Hand That Rocks the Cradle
- Bill & Ted's Excellent Adventure
- Star Wars

== Films shown by Jason and Jenny ==
- 21 Jump Street
- A Christmas Story
- American Pie
- Ant-Man and the Wasp
- Aquaman
- Avengers: Endgame
- Bad Teacher
- Barbie
- Black Panther
- Beetlejuice
- Captain America: Civil War
- Crazy Rich Asians
- Despicable Me 2
- Die Hard
- Elf
- The Flash
- Four Christmases
- The Goonies
- The Greatest Showman
- Grown Ups
- Guardians of the Galaxy Vol. 2
- The Hunger Games
- Kingsman: The Golden Circle
- Kong: Skull Island
- Legally Blonde
- Mad Max: Fury Road
- The Meg
- National Lampoon's Christmas Vacation
- Pitch Perfect 3
- Rampage
- Star Wars: Return of the Jedi
- Star Wars: The Rise of Skywalker
- Step Brothers
- Superman: The Movie
- Thor: Ragnarok
- Transformers
- Uncle Buck
- The Wedding Singer
- We're the Millers
- The Wizard of Oz

== See also ==
- Casino Cinema (similar movie program on Spike TV)
- USA Up All Night
- MonsterVision
- Elvira's Movie Macabre
- TCM Underground
