= Paul Gilmartin =

American comedian

- Gilmartin in Los Angeles, California, in 2011
- Born: January 9, 1963 (age 63); South Holland, Illinois, US
- Occupations: Comedian, comedy writer, podcast host, television personality, actor, carpenter
- Known for: Dinner and a Movie (television), The Mental Illness Happy Hour (podcast)
- Television: Dinner and a Movie, Comedy Central Presents, Politically Incorrect, The Late Late Show with Craig Ferguson
- Website: MentalPod.com , PaulGilmartin.com

Paul R. Gilmartin (born January 9, 1963) is an American stand-up comedian, podcast host, and television personality best known as the longtime host of TBS's Dinner and a Movie. Since 2011, he has been the host and executive producer of the podcast The Mental Illness Happy Hour.

== Early life ==
Paul Gilmartin was born in South Holland, Illinois, and attended St. Joseph's school in Homewood. He is an alumnus of Indiana University at Bloomington. While there, he majored in theater and was a member of the academic honor society Phi Beta Kappa. He also studied at Chicago's famed Second City. Before his foray into stand-up comedy in 1987, Gilmartin regularly appeared in several plays around Chicago.

== Career ==
=== Dinner and a Movie ===
In 1995, Gilmartin assumed hosting responsibilities for TBS cooking and entertainment show, Dinner and a Movie, a position he held for more than 16 years from the show's premiere to its eventual finale in 2011. While at the helm, Gilmartin was best known for his sardonic wit and self-effacing humor.

Throughout its run, the show relied heavily on Gilmartin's improvisational abilities and the easy-going rapport he established with his string of female co-hosts. Dinner and a Movie was a hit from the onset, helping significantly improve ratings for TBS. One critic dubbed it, "the first television show to combine well-worn theatrical movies, improvisational comedy and culinary education."

=== The Mental Illness Happy Hour ===
In 2011 Gilmartin launched a weekly podcast, The Mental Illness Happy Hour. The long-format interview style show examines lives affected by mental health issues, including depression, addiction, fear, anxiety, abuse, and gender identity. Gilmartin was described by The A.V. Club as "a patient and empathetic interviewer", and The New York Times noted that with these hosting abilities, he had created "a perversely safe place in which he and his guests talk about their fears, addictions and traumatic childhoods."

Gilmartin's guests on the podcast include celebrities, mental health professionals, and everyday people. Notable guests include Tiffany Haddish, Theo Fleury, Maria Bamford, Aisha Tyler, Dan Harris, Paul F. Tompkins and Doug Benson.

In its first year of production, the show received over 1 million downloads. It currently ranks as one of the most popular self-help podcasts on iTunes.

=== Additional appearances ===
Gilmartin's television credits include his own half-hour comedy special, "Comedy Central Presents Paul Gilmartin". He has also appeared on Politically Incorrect, The List on VH1, HBO Comedy Showcase, MTV's Half-Hour Comedy Hour, The Late Late Show with Craig Ferguson, This Week in Comedy and The Naughty Show. He is also a frequent guest on The Adam Carolla Show, performing political satire as right-wing Congressman Richard Martin and is a regular contributor to the nationally syndicated Bob and Tom Show.

As a live performer, Gilmartin has appeared before many audiences in the United States and abroad. His stage credits include the Montreal Comedy Festival, and three separate appearances at the Aspen Comedy Festival. Gilmartin has also appeared on the "Jimmy Dore Show" on KPFK 90.7FM, Los Angeles. He also appears on the Jimmy Dore show "Left, Right & Ridiculous" at the Improv Lab in Hollywood, California.

== Personal life ==
Gilmartin has faced his own battles with mental health and addiction. He has clinical depression, which went undiagnosed until his mid-30s. Following a major depressive episode in 2003, in which Gilmartin experienced suicidal thoughts, he entered treatment and discovered he had drug and alcohol addiction. He has been sober since 2003.

He currently resides in Los Angeles. In addition to his theatrical successes, Gilmartin is an accomplished practicing woodworker, creating pieces in a Danish Modern style.
