= Christian Cage =

Canadian wrestler & actor (born 1973)

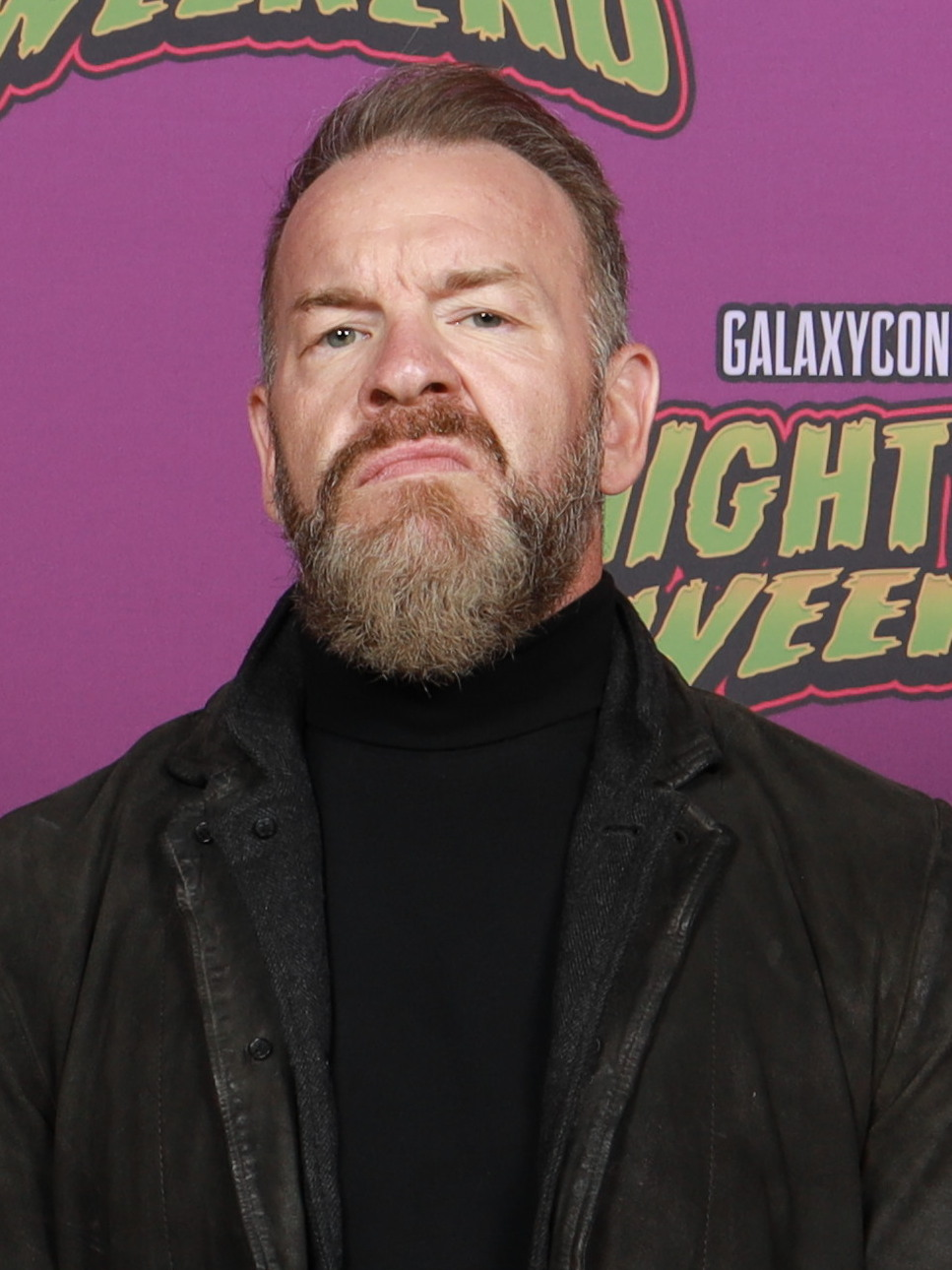
- Cage in 2025

Personal information
- Born: William Jason Reso; November 30, 1973 (age 52) Kitchener, Ontario, Canada
- Spouse: Denise Hartmann (m. 2001; div. 2020)
- Children: 1

Professional wrestling career
- Ring name(s): Canadian Rage; Captain Charisma; Christian; Christian Cage; Conquistador Dos; Male Nurse
- Billed height: 6 ft 1 in (185 cm)
- Billed weight: 218 lb (99 kg)
- Billed from: Toronto, Ontario, Canada
- Trained by: Dory Funk Jr. Ron Hutchison
- Debut: 1995

William Jason Reso (born November 30, 1973) is a Canadian professional wrestler and actor. He is signed to All Elite Wrestling (AEW), where he performs under the ring name Christian Cage and is one-half of Cage & Cope with Adam Copeland.

Reso made his debut in 1995. He wrestled in Canadian independent promotions early in his career, where he competed in singles and tag team competition with his best friend Edge. In 1998, he signed a developmental contract with the then-World Wrestling Federation (WWF, renamed to WWE in 2002) and made his debut the same year as Christian, immediately capturing his first championship in the company, the WWF Light Heavyweight Championship, in his debut match. Edge and Christian gained notoriety for their participation in Tables, Ladders, and Chairs matches. They won the promotion's World Tag Team Championship on seven occasions. They are considered one of the major teams that revived tag team wrestling during the Attitude Era. The team parted ways in 2001, after which, Christian held various singles titles in WWE, including the European, Hardcore, and Intercontinental Championships.

In 2005, Reso departed WWE and signed with Total Nonstop Action Wrestling (TNA) under his Christian Cage ring name, after which, he won the NWA World Heavyweight Championship twice. He left TNA in late 2008 and re-signed with WWE in 2009, where he won the ECW Championship and the World Heavyweight Championship twice each until retiring in 2014 due to concussion issues. He was the 23rd Triple Crown Champion and 11th Grand Slam Champion in WWE history.

In March 2021, Cage made his debut for AEW, again reverting to his Christian Cage moniker, and officially resuming his in-ring wrestling career. Following this, he won the Impact World Championship on the first episode of AEW Rampage in 2021 (as AEW and Impact, now once again TNA, had a partnership at the time), and in 2023, he won his first title under the AEW banner in the AEW TNT Championship, which he has held twice. Additionally, he is a former one-time AEW World Trios Champion. He has headlined multiple pay-per-view events between WWE, TNA and AEW, and was one of WWE's most prolific pay-per-view performers. Between the three aforementioned promotions, Cage has held 27 total championships, including seven world titles and ten tag team titles.

== Early life ==
William Jason "Jay" Reso was born in Kitchener, Ontario, on November 30, 1973, the son of Canadian mother Carol and American father Randy Reso. He played ice hockey and was a wrestling fan as a child. He lived in Huntsville and East Luther-Grand Valley before moving to Orangeville, where he met Adam "Edge" Copeland, who became his best friend and tag team partner. They attended Orangeville District Secondary School together, from which they both graduated.

== Professional wrestling career ==
=== Early career (1994–1998) ===
In September 1994, Reso enrolled in a wrestling school run by Ron Hutchison at Sully's Gym. One of his early ring names was Christian Cage, a combination of the names of actors Christian Slater and Nicolas Cage. Cage's wrestling career began in June 1995 in a match against Zakk Wyld, which resulted in a draw. In 1997, he was a part of Thug Life, a stable that included Joe E. Legend, Zakk Wyld, Rhino Richards, and Copeland (under the name Sexton Hardcastle). As a tag team on the Canadian independent circuit, Reso and Copeland were known as High Impact and later The Suicide Blondes. The duo held titles in numerous promotions and competed in the United States and Japan. Reso won the East Coast Wrestling Association (ECWA) Heavyweight Championship on July 18, 1998, which he held until October 15, 1999. When Copeland received a tryout match with the World Wrestling Federation (WWF), Reso went with him and they faced off in a non-televised tryout match, which Copeland was booked to win. After the tryout, once Copeland was promoted from his developmental status to touring with the WWF, he put in a good word for Reso and got him invited to Dory Funk Jr.'s WWF-affiliated Funking Conservatory training camp in 1998. After completing his training at the conservatory, Reso signed a contract with the WWF to become a full-time performer.

=== World Wrestling Federation / World Wrestling Entertainment (1998–2005) ===
==== The Brood (1998–1999) ====
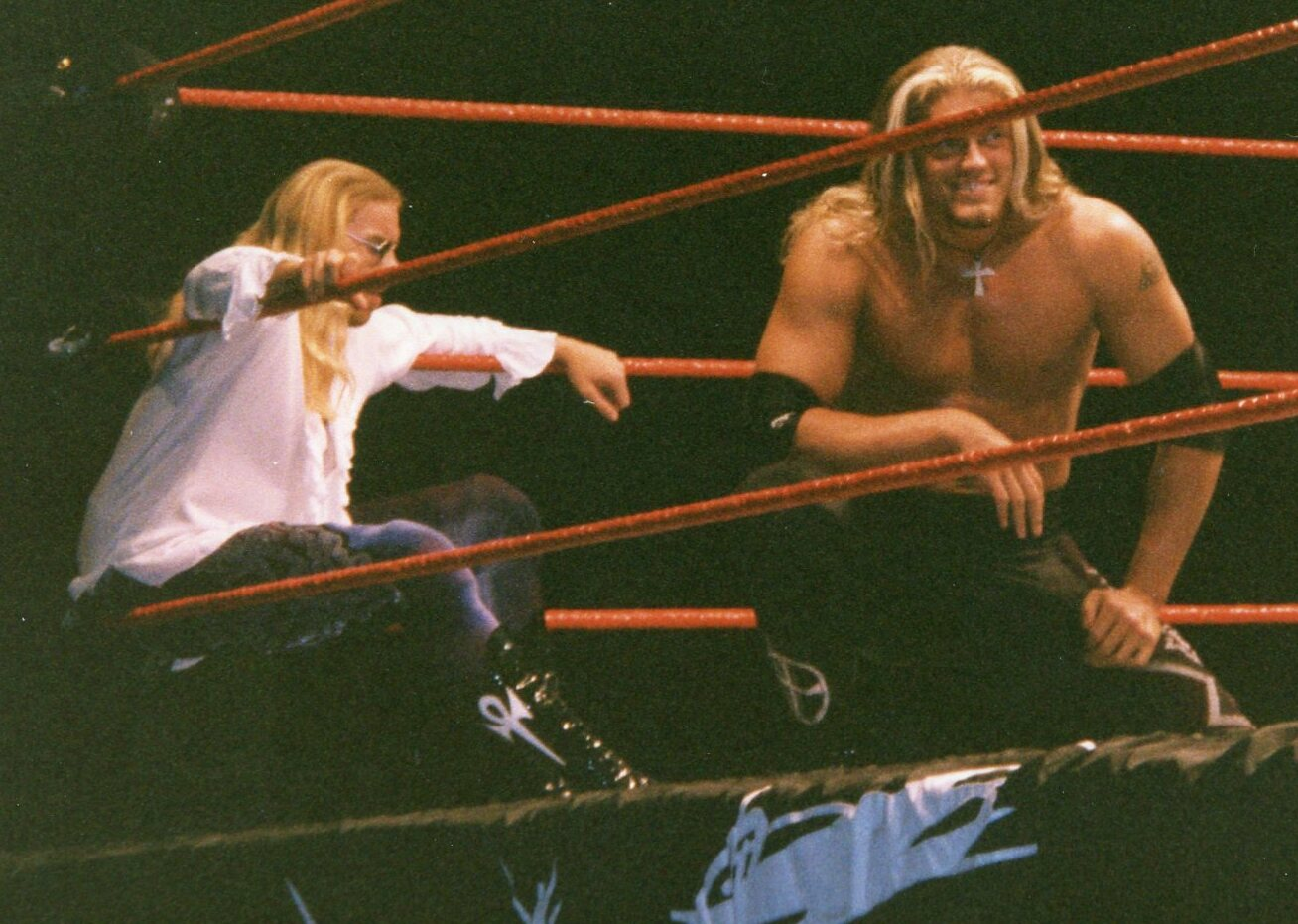
Christian (left) with Edge in their Brood attire, which they used along with gothic symbols, in April 1999

When Reso came to the WWF, he shortened his ring name to Christian. Christian made his television debut as a heel at WWF's pay-per-view event Breakdown: In Your House on September 27, distracting Edge during his match against Owen Hart to reveal his allegiance to Gangrel. Christian won the WWF Light Heavyweight Championship in his debut match against Taka Michinoku at Judgment Day: In Your House on October 18. He lost the title to Gillberg a month later.

Christian was given the character of a vampire and formed an alliance with Gangrel and Edge, who (in storyline) was finally persuaded to join what became known as The Brood. At Rock Bottom: In Your House on December 13, The Brood defeated The J.O.B. Squad in a six-man tag team match, then they briefly feuded with The Undertaker's Ministry of Darkness and later joining the team, but upon learning that Christian was beaten into telling Ken Shamrock the whereabouts of Stephanie McMahon, The Undertaker punished Christian by flogging him. More loyal to The Brood than to The Ministry, Edge and Gangrel betrayed The Undertaker and rescued Christian from sacrifice.

==== Edge & Christian (1999–2001) ====
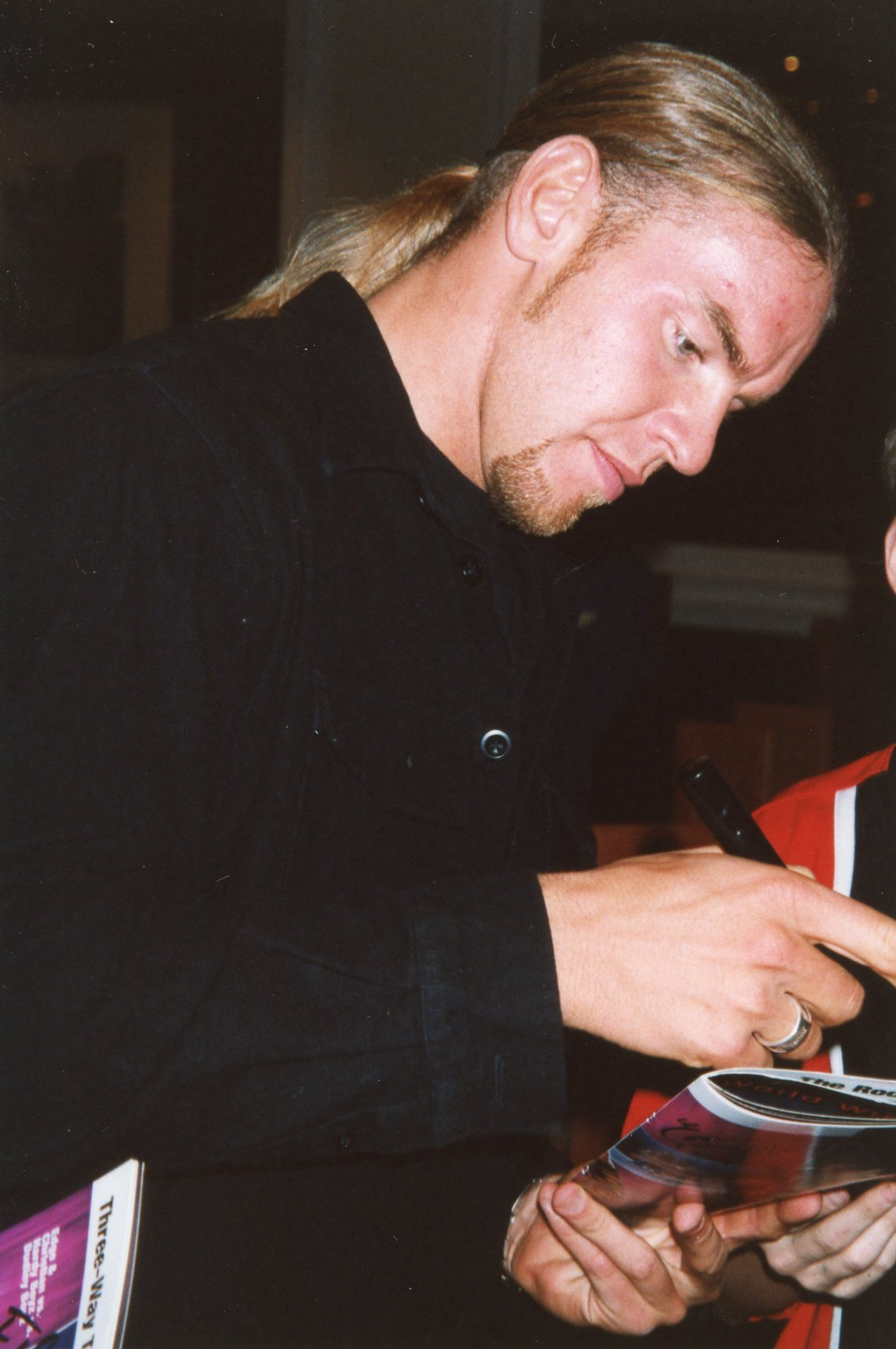
Christian signing autographs in 1999

In July 1999, Christian and Edge parted ways with Gangrel, who associated himself with the Hardy Boyz (Jeff and Matt Hardy) to form The New Brood. As a result, they began feuding with the Hardy Boyz and competed in a ladder match for the managerial services of Terri Runnels and $100,000 at No Mercy on October 17, which the Hardy Boyz won.

At Survivor Series in November 1999, Christian and Edge teamed with the Hardy Boyz in a loss to the Holly Cousins and Too Cool. At Armageddon in December 1999, they competed in a #1 contender tag team battle royal for the WWF Tag Team Championship that was won by the Acolytes. Christian competed in the Royal Rumble in January 2000, but was eliminated by Rikishi. At No Way Out in February 2000, Christian and Edge defeated the Hardy Boyz to become number one contenders to the WWF Tag Team Championship.

At WrestleMania 2000 on April 2, Christian and Edge defeated the Hardy Boyz and the Dudley Boyz to win their first WWF Tag Team Championship in a triangle ladder match. Following their victory, Christian and Edge portrayed themselves as heels, shifting their in-ring personas from borderline goth to a comedic pair of "cool dudes". During this time, their trademark became the "five second pose", where they performed a pose in the ring for five seconds "for the benefit of those with flash photography" to mock, insult, or amuse the fans. At Backlash on April 30, Christian and Edge defeated Road Dogg and X-Pac to retain the titles. At Judgment Day on May 21, Christian, Edge and Kurt Angle lost a six-man tag team match to Rikishi and Too Cool. On the May 29, 2000 episode of Raw is War, Too Cool defeated Christian and Edge for the WWF Tag Team Championship after Joe C. interfered in the match.

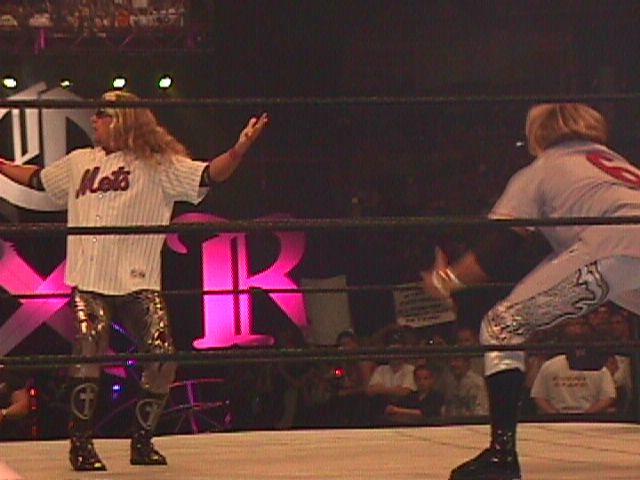
Christian and Edge (right) at King of the Ring in June 2000

Christian and Edge won the WWF Tag Team Championship back in a four corners elimination match at King of the Ring on June 25. At Fully Loaded on July 23, Christian and Edge lost to the Acolytes Protection Agency (Bradshaw and Faarooq) by disqualification, but they retained the titles. At SummerSlam on August 27, Christian and Edge successfully defended the tag team titles in the first ever tables, ladders, and chairs match against The Hardy Boyz and The Dudley Boyz.

At Unforgiven on September 24, Christian and Edge lost the titles to the Hardy Boyz in a steel cage match and were not allowed another title shot. At No Mercy on October 22, Christian and Edge (disguised as Los Conquistadores) defeated The Hardys for the titles. The next night on Raw Is War, the Hardy Boyz dressed as the Los Conquistadores and defeated Edge in a handicap match after Christian was taken out backstage to regain the WWF Tag Team Championship. At Survivor Series on November 19, Christian and Edge teamed with Right to Censor's Bull Buchanan and The Goodfather in a four-on-four Survivor Series elimination match which they lost to The Dudleys and The Hardyz.

At Armageddon on December 10, Christian and Edge regained the tag team titles in a fatal four-way match involving The Dudley Boyz, K-Kwik and Road Dogg and The Right to Censor, but they lost them eight days later to The Rock and The Undertaker only to win them back days later on SmackDown! thanks to special guest referee Kurt Angle. At the Royal Rumble on January 21, 2001, Christian and Edge lost the WWF Tag Team Championship to the Dudley Boyz. At No Way Out on February 25, Christian and Edge were unsuccessful in regaining the tag team titles.

Christian and Edge recaptured the WWF Tag Team Championship in the second ever TLC match at WrestleMania X-Seven on April 1. On the April 19 episode of SmackDown!, Christian and Edge were defeated by the Brothers of Destruction (Kane and The Undertaker) for the WWF Tag Team Championship.

At Backlash on April 29, Christian was part of the triple threat match for the WWF European Championship which was won by Matt Hardy. At Judgment Day on May 21, Christian and Edge competed in a tag team turmoil match which was won by Chris Benoit and Chris Jericho. On the May 24 episode of SmackDown!, Christian and Edge competed in a fatal four-way tag team TLC match for the WWF Tag Team Championship in which Benoit and Jericho retained the tag team titles.

After losing the tag team titles, friction arose within the team after Edge won the 2001 King of the Ring tournament on June 24. It was also during this time that Edge was becoming a face during The Invasion storyline. Christian briefly turned face to help feud with The Alliance. Christian turned heel shortly afterward, resulting in the two feuding for Edge's WWF Intercontinental Championship for several weeks.

==== The Un-Americans (2001–2002) ====
At Unforgiven on September 23, Christian defeated Edge to win his first Intercontinental Championship, but he lost it back to Edge in a ladder match at No Mercy on October 21. Christian won the WWF European Championship from Bradshaw on the November 1 episode of SmackDown!. At Rebellion on November 3, Christian faced Edge in a steel cage match for the Intercontinental Championship, but he failed to win the title. At Survivor Series on November 18, Christian defeated Al Snow to retain the European Championship. Christian lost the European Championship to Diamond Dallas Page on the January 31, 2002 episode of SmackDown!.

After a series of defeats, Christian announced he would quit the WWF, but Page persuaded him to reconsider and adopted him as his protégé. Christian betrayed Page and faced off against him for the European Championship at WrestleMania X8 on March 17, but he lost. Christian began throwing tantrums in his gimmick at the time whenever things did not go his way and during the same event defeated Mighty Molly to win the WWF Hardcore Championship, but lost the title to Maven later that night.

On the March 25 episode of Raw, Christian was drafted to the SmackDown! brand as part of the 2002 WWF draft lottery. Christian formed an alliance with fellow Canadian wrestler Lance Storm on the June 20 episode of SmackDown!. On the June 27 episode of SmackDown!, Test, another Canadian, joined their team, now called The Un-Americans. Christian and Storm won the WWE Tag Team Championship at Vengeance on July 21 by defeating Edge and Hollywood Hulk Hogan. The trio then defected from SmackDown! to the Raw brand (moving the WWE Tag Team Championship to Raw in the process), appearing on the July 29 episode of Raw to attack The Undertaker. The Un-Americans teamed with Triple H, to defeat WWE Undisputed Champion The Rock, The Undertaker and Booker T and Goldust in an eight-man tag team match on the August 12 episode of Raw, after Test pinned The Undertaker. At SummerSlam on August 25, Christian and Storm retained the WWE Tag Team Championship against Booker T and Goldust, before interfering in Test's match with The Undertaker later in the night, only to be tossed out of the ring and for The Undertaker to defeat Test. On the August 26 episode of Raw, the Un-Americans attempted to burn the American flag, but were stopped by Booker T, Goldust and a returning Kane. On the September 2 episode of Raw, William Regal joined the team. Regal, an Englishman, was the only member of the team not of Canadian nationality. At Unforgiven on September 22, The Un-Americans lost to Bubba Ray Dudley, Kane and Booker T and Goldust. The Un-Americans lost the WWE Tag Team Championship the next night on Raw to the team of The Hurricane and Kane. On the September 30 episode of Raw, both Christian and Storm lost matches to Randy Orton, while Regal and Test lost to Rob Van Dam and Tommy Dreamer. This led to all four members attacking each other, thus disbanding the team.

==== Teaming and feuding with Chris Jericho (2002–2004) ====
Christian formed a tag team with Chris Jericho and competed in a fatal four-way tag team TLC match for the World Tag Team Championship on the October 7 special episode of Raw Roulette, involving Kane, Jeff Hardy and Rob Van Dam and Bubba Ray and Spike Dudley. Despite Kane's partner the Hurricane being absent from the match, he still retained the title. Christian and Jericho won the titles the next week on the October 14 episode of Raw. At Armageddon on December 15, Christian and Jericho lost the World Tag Team Championship to Booker T and Goldust in a fatal four-way elimination match also involving the teams of The Dudley Boyz and Lance Storm and William Regal.

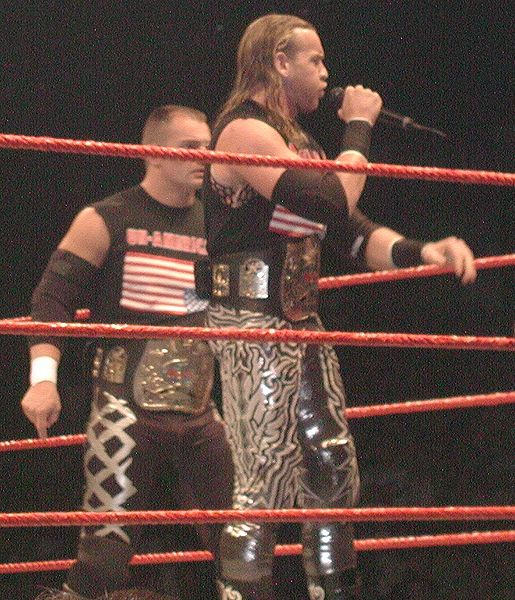
A nine-time WWE Tag Team Champion, Christian's eighth reign came in early 2002 alongside Lance Storm.

On January 19, 2003, Christian entered the Royal Rumble match at the Royal Rumble and was eliminated by Jericho. After a short absence, Christian returned on the April 7 episode of Raw, self-proclaiming himself as the new "People's Champion" and began calling his fans "The Peeps" after receiving advice and endorsement from The Rock. On the May 5 episode of Raw, Christian faced Goldberg, but the match ended in a no contest when 3-Minute Warning got involved which led to a rematch on the May 12 episode of Raw, where Christian lost to Goldberg in a steel cage match. At Judgment Day on May 18, Christian went on to win a nine-man over-the-top-rope battle royal for his second Intercontinental Championship. Christian lost the Intercontinental Championship to Booker T on the July 7 episode of Raw, but he regained it after Booker T was legitimately injured at a house show on August 10.

At Unforgiven on September 21, Christian defeated Chris Jericho and Rob Van Dam to retain the title in a triple threat match, but later lost the title to Van Dam in a ladder match on the September 29 episode of Raw. At Survivor Series on November 16, Christian was a part of Team Bischoff taking on Team Austin and during the match he eliminated Bubba Ray Dudley before he was eliminated by Shawn Michaels, though in the end Team Bischoff eventually won the match. At Armageddon on December 14, Christian and Jericho defeated Lita and Trish Stratus in an intergender tag team match billed as the "Battle of the Sexes."

At WrestleMania XX on March 14, 2004, Christian faced Jericho in a singles match with Stratus on Jericho's side, but Stratus accidentally struck Jericho, allowing Christian to defeat Jericho. Stratus then joined forces with Christian, becoming his on-screen girlfriend in the process. As Christian feuded with Jericho, he introduced his own personal bodyguard, Tyson Tomko, which he dubbed his personal "problem solver". At Backlash on April 18, Christian and Stratus faced Jericho in an intergender handicap match which they lost. During a steel cage match against Jericho on the May 10 episode of Raw which he lost, Christian suffered a severe back injury, causing him to miss almost four months of in-ring action. Christian returned on the August 30 episode of Raw, attacking Jericho and thus resuming their feud. The two had a ladder match for the vacant Intercontinental Championship at Unforgiven on September 12, which Christian lost, ending their feud.

==== Final storylines and departure (2004–2005) ====
At Survivor Series on November 14, Christian failed to win the Intercontinental Championship from Shelton Benjamin. At New Year's Revolution on January 9, 2005, Christian and Tyson Tomko faced Eugene and William Regal for the World Tag Team Championship, but they failed to win the titles. At the Royal Rumble on January 30, Christian competed in the Royal Rumble match, but he was eliminated by eventual winner Batista.

Christian participated in the first-ever Money in the Bank ladder match at WrestleMania 21 on April 3, but he failed to win as the match was won by Edge. Following this, Christian, who had an encounter with SmackDown! wrestler John Cena, began commenting on Cena, claiming he was a better rapper than Cena and denouncing him as "poseur" while being noticeably cheered during these segments. Soon after, then-WWE Champion Cena was drafted to the Raw brand on the June 6 episode of Raw, where Cena successfully defended the WWE Championship in a triple threat match against Christian and Chris Jericho at Vengeance on June 26.

On the June 30 episode of SmackDown!, Christian was drafted to the SmackDown! brand in the 2005 WWE draft lottery and replaced Big Show (who was drafted to Raw) in a six-man elimination match for the newly created SmackDown! Championship, but he lost to John "Bradshaw" Layfield (JBL). Soon after, Christian was given his own interview segment on SmackDown! called The Peep Show. At The Great American Bash on July 24, Christian faced Booker T in a losing effort. At No Mercy on October 9, Christian competed in a fatal four-way match for the United States Championship which was won by Chris Benoit.

On October 31, Christian's contract with WWE expired. According to wrestling journalist Dave Meltzer, Reso was asked on the spot to sign a new contract, but he declined. According to Reso, during his feud with John Cena he noticed that, despite his popularity, the WWE didn't see him as a main eventer and needed to prove himself. His last match occurred during the tapings for the November 4 episode of SmackDown!, where he and JBL lost to Rey Mysterio and Matt Hardy. Despite his quitting, Christian appeared on the October 31 episode of Raw and at Taboo Tuesday on November 1.

Before leaving WWE, Reso filed to trademark the nickname of "Captain Charisma", which allowed him to use it as Christian Cage in Total Nonstop Action Wrestling (TNA), but after WWE disputed the trademark claim by citing a provision in the terms of his old contract he stopped officially using it on TNA programming by the summer of 2006, calling himself "The Instant Classic" from early 2007 onwards although he still continued to be referred to as "Captain Charisma" in off-screen appearances and sometimes wore his "Captain Charisma" entrance jumpsuits to the ring at live events.

=== Total Nonstop Action Wrestling (2005–2008, 2012, 2021) ===
==== NWA World Heavyweight Champion (2005–2007) ====
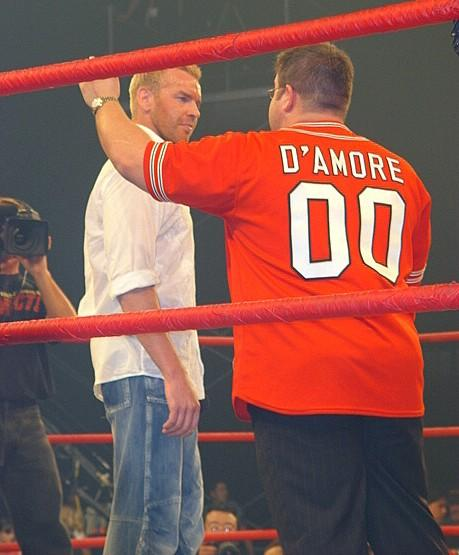
Christian with "Coach" Scott D'Amore during his debut at Genesis in November 2005

On November 13, 2005, Reso made his debut as a face in Total Nonstop Action Wrestling (TNA) at TNA's pay-per-view event Genesis under his old ring name Christian Cage. He announced his intentions to win the NWA World Heavyweight Championship held by Jeff Jarrett and rejected joining Scott D'Amore's faction, Team Canada.

Cage would defeat Monty Brown at Turning Point on December 11 to become number one contender to the NWA World Heavyweight Championship. At Final Resolution on January 15, 2006, Cage teamed with Sting to defeat the team of Monty Brown and Jeff Jarrett. and defeated Jarrett for the NWA World Heavyweight Championship at Against All Odds on February 12. Cage had his first title defence at Destination X on March 12, where he defeated Brown to retain the title. On the March 25 and April 1 respective Impact! episodes, Abyss, his manager Father James Mitchell and Alex Shelley showed two pre-taped video packages that had been compiled in the weeks before the episodes, with first on March 25 depicting Mitchell stalking Cage's wife Denise, confronting her and even threatening that "they were coming". The second aired on April 1, with Abyss, accompanied by Mitchell and Shelley, who was taping the segment with a camcorder like the previous video package, attacking Cage at his home in Tampa, Florida and nearly drowning Cage in his own pool. This storyline led to Cage facing Abyss at Lockdown on April 23 in a six sides of steel cage match for the NWA World Heavyweight Championship, with Cage winning and attempting after the match to attack Mitchell and gain revenge for all his recent evil deeds against Cage and his family, but Abyss stopped him, took a steel chain, wrapped it around Cage's neck and attempted to hang him with it until he passed out, after which Abyss and Mitchell stole the title belt and left the arena. The storyline between Abyss and Mitchell and Cage continued until Sacrifice on May 14, where Cage defeated Abyss to retain the NWA World Heavyweight Championship under Full Metal Mayhem rules.

At Slammiversary on June 18, 2006, Cage lost the NWA World Heavyweight Championship to Jeff Jarrett in a King of the Mountain match, which also involved Abyss, Ron Killings and Sting. Larry Zbyszko and referee Earl Hebner intervened at the end of the match by helping Jarrett win. The title was declared vacant until TNA's main authority figure at the time, Management Director Jim Cornette, awarded the title belt back to Jarrett on the June 29 episode of Impact! on the condition that he defend it against the winner of a four-way match involving Cage, Samoa Joe, Scott Steiner and Sting at Victory Road on July 16. Jarrett agreed to the condition and Sting became the new number one contender at Victory Road.

After Victory Road, Cage befriended the new number one contender Sting on the July 27, 2006 episode of Impact! by asking for forgiveness for doubting Sting's agenda by coming to TNA in January of that year. Cage went on to say that he had asked Cornette the week before if he could be in Sting's corner in his match with Jarrett for the NWA World Heavyweight Championship at Hard Justice on August 13, but Cornette had told him he needed Sting's approval. Sting accepted Cage's offer, with interviewer and occasional ring announcer Jeremy Borash announcing Sting's decision in a backstage segment on the August 3 episode of Impact!. At Hard Justice, Cage was in Sting's corner at Hard Justice as he faced Jarrett (with Scott Steiner in his corner) and during the contest interfered to help Sting win numerous times—as did Steiner for Jarrett—until Cage turned on Sting by taking Jarrett's signature guitar and bashing it over his head—turning heel in the process. Cage then allowed Jarrett to pin Sting and retain the NWA World Heavyweight Championship.

After Hard Justice, Cage began a feud with Rhino as Rhino questioned Cage on his actions at Hard Justice on the August 17, 2006 episode of Impact!, but Cage replied saying he did it for the good of TNA. Cage went on to explain later in the episode during a sit-down interview with TNA commentator Mike Tenay that he attacked Sting because he felt Sting did not show enough passion during the encounter to "get the job done" and win the NWA World Heavyweight Championship. The following week on Impact!, Cage came down to the ring where he addressed his attack on Sting further until he was interrupted by Rhino, who attacked after a small debate, starting a brawl between the two which came to an end after Cage laid Rhino's head on a steel chair, picked up another chair and bashed it over the outside of Rhino's head performing a one-man con-chair-to in the process. This led to a match against Rhino at No Surrender on September 24, which Cage won. A rematch was held at Bound for Glory on October 22, which Cage also won under 8 Mile Street Fight rules. They had their final bout on the November 16 episode of Impact!, where Cage defeated Rhino in a barbed wire six sides of steel cage match.

Christian at a TNA house show in 2007

Cage's old WWE enforcer Tyson Tomko (now going simply by Tomko) made his TNA debut on the November 23, 2006 episode of Impact! helping Cage in a match against Sting. With Tomko at his side, Cage set his sights on the NWA World Heavyweight Championship now held by Abyss and at Turning Point on December 10 fought Abyss and Sting in a three-way match for the title, but he failed to win the match as Abyss won to retain the championship after pinning Sting. Cage fought for the NWA World Heavyweight Championship once again at Final Resolution on January 14, 2007 against Abyss and Sting, this time in a three-way elimination match that he won by pinning Sting after Abyss was already eliminated to win the championship. After Final Resolution, Cage prepared for his title defence against the new number one contender Kurt Angle, who had defeated Samoa Joe in a 30-minute Iron Man match at Final Resolution to gain the opportunity. Heading into their encounter at Against All Odds on February 11, Cage announced on the January 17 episode of Impact! that he had hired a special consultant to assist him in training for his bout with Angle. This consultant was revealed on the February 8 episode of Impact!, who turned out to be Scott Steiner after he attacked Angle following a match pitting the team of Angle and Joe against Cage and A.J. Styles. Cage went on to retain the NWA World Heavyweight Championship against Angle at Against All Odds with Joe as the unofficial special outside enforcer.

==== Christian's Coalition and departure (2007–2008) ====
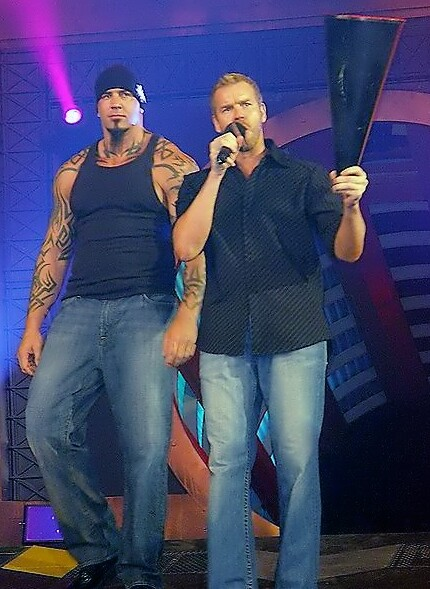
Christian (right) and Tomko (left) were reunited in TNA while in the alliance called Christian's Coalition

On the March 8, 2007 episode of Impact!, Cage proclaimed that he, Tomko and Scott Steiner were an "inseparable family", which he called Christian's Coalition. After a short feud with Samoa Joe, culminating in a victory for Cage at Destination X on March 11 for the NWA World Heavyweight Championship, Cage was announced as a captain of a five-man team for the Lethal Lockdown match at Lockdown against Team Angle during the March 15, 2007 episode of Impact!. At Lockdown on April 15, Team Cage (Cage, Tomko, Steiner, A.J. Styles and Abyss) went on to lose to Team Angle (Angle, Joe, Rhino, Sting and Jeff Jarrett). A stipulation was added that the wrestler who got the pinfall would become number one contender for the NWA World Heavyweight Championship and have their title shot at Sacrifice. Sting was the individual who gained the pinfall victory for Team Angle and became the new number one contender.

Abyss was later kicked out of the group after he attacked Cage on the April 19, 2007 episode of Impact!. Steiner was the next to leave the group after he was attacked by Tomko following their NWA World Tag Team Championship match at Sacrifice. Cage was set to defend the NWA World Heavyweight Championship against Sting at Sacrifice, but Angle was added to the match on the May 3, 2007 episode of Impact!, making it a three-way match. At Sacrifice on May 13, the National Wrestling Alliance (NWA), the owners of the NWA World Heavyweight and the NWA World Tag Team Championships, stripped Cage and Team 3D of the titles. NWA Executive Director Robert K. Trobich stated the reason was that Cage refused to defend the NWA world title at NWA live events. Cage, still holding the physical NWA world title belt, defended what was billed as the World Heavyweight Championship against Sting and Angle, who was the victor of said contest by making Sting submit (who had "technically" just pinned Cage at the very same moment) and was announced as the new World Heavyweight Champion. On the following episode of Impact!, Angle came to the ring with a new championship belt in-tow and announced he was the new TNA World Heavyweight Champion, a championship that TNA had just introduced at Sacrifice. Afterwards, Cage and Sting came to the ring and the three began to argue over who was the new TNA World Heavyweight Champion, but due to the controversial finish to their match at Sacrifice the title was declared vacant by Cornette and a tournament was held for the title which culminated in a King of the Mountain match at Slammiversary on June 17. Cage won entry into the match on the June 14 episode of Impact! by defeating Abyss. At Slammiversary, Cage failed to defeat the four other men (Styles, Joe, Angle and Chris Harris) and win the title as Angle hung the title belt to become the new and undisputed TNA World Heavyweight Champion.

Christian making his way to the ring in August 2007

After defeating Harris at Victory Road on July 17, 2007, and him, Tomko and Styles losing to the team of Andrew Martin, Sting and Abyss at Hard Justice on August 12 in a Doomsday Chamber of Blood match to become number one contender to the TNA World Heavyweight Championship, Cage restarted his feud with Samoa Joe and the two met at No Surrender on September 9, where he defeated Joe by disqualification when Joe refused to release his rear naked choke submission hold he had applied. The two had a rematch with Matt Morgan as the special outside enforcer at Bound for Glory on October 14, where Cage lost to Joe and ended his 23-month-long undefeated streak by not officially being pinned nor made to submit. Cage and Joe fought one more time on the October 18 episode of Impact!, with a spot in the 2007 Fight for the Right tournament to become number one contender to the TNA World Heavyweight Championship. Cage defeated Joe to gain entry. Cage made it all the way to the final round of the tournament, where he fought Kaz on the November 8 episode of Impact!, defeating Kaz due to interference from Styles and Tomko on Cage's behalf, but the match was declared a no contest, with the finals being determined in a ladder match at Genesis on November 11. He lost the tournament final the second time around at Genesis. Later in the night, Styles and Tomko helped Angle retain the TNA World Heavyweight Championship during the main event as Cage looked on from the ramp. Styles and Tomko were later announced as members of Angle's new group, The Angle Alliance, which led to a title match between the two at Final Resolution on January 6, 2008 and also turning Cage face in the process.

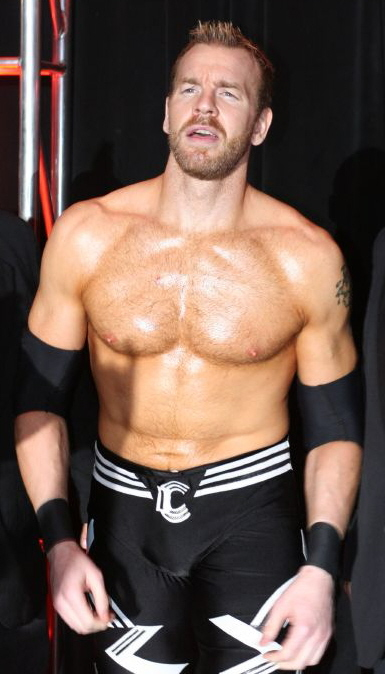
Christian in September 2008

On the January 3, 2008 episode of Impact!, Tomko left both Christian's Coalition and the Angle Alliance. Cage failed to win the title at Final Resolution as a result of Styles' betraying and attacking him during the bout, ending Christian's Coalition. At Against All Odds on February 10, Cage got a rematch against Angle with Samoa Joe as the special outside enforcer, but he once again was defeated by Angle as this time Tomko interfered and cost Cage the match. Cage teamed with Joe and Kevin Nash (known as The Unlikely Alliance) at Destination X on March 9 to defeat The Angle Alliance (Angle, Styles and Tomko) in a six-man tag team match. On the March 13 episode of Impact!, Cage and Tomko were announced as opposing team captains for a Lethal Lockdown match at Lockdown. At Lockdown on April 13, Team Cage (Cage, Rhino, Nash, Morgan and Sting) went on to defeat Team Tomko (Tomko, Styles, Brother Devon, Brother Ray and James Storm) at the event. Afterwards, Cage and Rhino began competition as a regular tag team, with the pair being involved in The Deuce's Wild Tag Team Tournament for the vacant TNA World Tag Team Championship, but they failed to win the tournament and the championship at Sacrifice on May 11. At Slammiversary on June 8, Cage and Rhino were involved as single competitors in a King of the Mountain match for the TNA World Heavyweight Championship, but they failed to win the match. Cage and Rhino went on to team with Styles (who had made amends with Cage and Rhino) in a losing effort against Angle, Brother Devon, and Brother Ray in a Full Metal Mayhem match at Victory Road on July 13. At Hard Justice on August 10, Cage and Rhino defeated Team 3D in a New Jersey Street Fight. Cage was involved in a three-way match for the TNA World Heavyweight Championship against the champion Samoa Joe and Kurt Angle at No Surrender on September 13, but he failed to win the title. Cage then went on to participate in another three-way match against Styles and Booker T at Bound for Glory IV on October 12, which Booker T won. Cage was defeated in his final TNA match by Booker T for the newly established TNA Legends Championship at Turning Point on November 9, with the stipulation that if Cage lost, he would have to join the newly formed Main Event Mafia. On the November 13 episode of Impact!, Cage had his final appearance in TNA before his contract expired as during the telecast he was to be inducted into The Main Event Mafia, but Cage was attacked and "injured" by Angle, Booker T, Nash and Scott Steiner after Angle learned that he would go back to WWE when his contract expired.

==== One night return (2012) ====
In 2012, Reso made a one night return to TNA at Slammiversary 10 under his old ring name Christian Cage to announce the number one moment in TNA history as voted by the TNA fans (Sting's 2006 return in the aforementioned Final Resolution tag team main event). This was part of a deal which in return WWE were able to use Ric Flair in programming and induct him into the WWE Hall of Fame as a member of the Four Horsemen stable.

==== Impact World Champion (2021) ====
On August 13, 2021 on the premiere episode of Rampage, Cage defeated Kenny Omega to win the Impact World Championship. On the August 19, 2021 episode of Impact!, as the new Impact World Champion, he made his first Impact appearance since 2012. The announcers recognized his previous two NWA World Heavyweight Championship reigns, though this recent reign was his first under the Impact World Championship lineage. Upon his return, he retired the TNA World Heavyweight Championship and considered the Impact World Championship the sole world title belt in the promotion. He was then confronted by Brian Myers, his challenger at Emergence, a match which Cage won. He then retained his title against Ace Austin at Victory Road. On the October 7 episode of Impact!, Cage and Josh Alexander defeated Ace Austin and Madman Fulton. At Bound for Glory on October 23, Cage lost the title to Josh Alexander.

=== One Pro Wrestling (2006) ===
In March 2006, Reso competed as Christian Cage three times in the United Kingdom for the One Pro Wrestling (1PW) promotion. His first appearance was on March 4 at their All or Nothing: Night 1 event, where he defeated Rhino. His second appearance was at 1PW's Know Your Enemy: Night 1 event on May 26, defeating Steve Corino. At Know Your Enemy: Night 2 event on May 27, 2006, Cage fought against the champion Abyss and Corino for the 1PW World Heavyweight Championship in a three-way dance, but failed to win as Corino gained the fall and the title.

=== Ring of Honor (2006) ===
In May 2006, Reso made two appearances for the Ring of Honor (ROH) promotion as Christian Cage. His first appearance was on May 12 at ROH's How We Roll event in a tag match with Colt Cabana against Bryan Danielson and Christopher Daniels, which Cage and Cabana won. His second appearance was a loss to Daniels at ROH's Generation Now event on July 29.

=== New Japan Pro-Wrestling (2008) ===
On January 4, 2008, Cage, while still under contract with TNA, made a one-time appearance for New Japan Pro-Wrestling (NJPW) at the Wrestle Kingdom II event, teaming with fellow TNA wrestlers A.J. Styles and Petey Williams to defeat RISE (Milano Collection A. T., Minoru and Prince Devitt).

=== Return to WWE (2009–2021) ===
==== ECW Champion (2009–2010) ====
Reso returned to WWE on the February 10 episode of ECW under his old ring name Christian as a face, confronting then ECW Champion Jack Swagger. Later that night, Christian defeated Swagger in his first match back. On the February 24 episode of ECW, Christian faced Swagger again for the ECW Championship in a losing effort. Christian won a tri-branded 15-man battle royal on the March 10 episode of ECW, gaining entry into the Money in the Bank ladder match at WrestleMania 25 on April 5, which he failed to win.

Christian won an elimination chase tournament to become the number one contender to the ECW Championship, gaining a title match at Backlash. At Backlash on April 26, Christian defeated Swagger to win the ECW Championship. At Judgment Day on May 17, Christian defeated Swagger in a rematch to retain the title. At Extreme Rules on June 7, Christian lost the ECW Championship to Tommy Dreamer in a triple threat hardcore match also involving Swagger.

On the June 15 episode of Raw, Christian faced Dreamer for the ECW Championship in a losing effort. After unsuccessfully challenging for the ECW Championship in a Championship Scramble match that also included Swagger, Finlay and Mark Henry at The Bash on June 28, Christian regained the ECW Championship from Dreamer at Night of Champions on July 26.

On the August 4 episode of ECW, Christian retained the ECW Championship in an Extreme Rules match against Dreamer. Christian then began a rivalry with William Regal over the ECW Championship, retaining the title against him at SummerSlam in eight seconds on August 23, and at Breaking Point on September 13. After a few months of defending the ECW Championship on ECW only, retaining the title against the likes of Zack Ryder and Yoshi Tatsu, Christian was part of Team Kingston in a Survivor Series elimination match at Survivor Series on November 22, where he eliminated both Ted DiBiase and Cody Rhodes before being eliminated by Randy Orton. Team Kingston went on to win. At TLC: Tables, Ladders & Chairs on December 13, Christian successfully defended the ECW Championship against Shelton Benjamin in a ladder match. In late December 2009, Christian became the longest reigning WWE-era ECW Champion. At the Royal Rumble on January 31, 2010, Christian successfully defended the ECW Championship against Ezekiel Jackson. On the February 16 episode of ECW, Christian lost the ECW Championship in an Extreme Rules match to Jackson on the show's final episode. The ECW brand was deactivated shortly after.

==== World Heavyweight Champion (2010–2011) ====
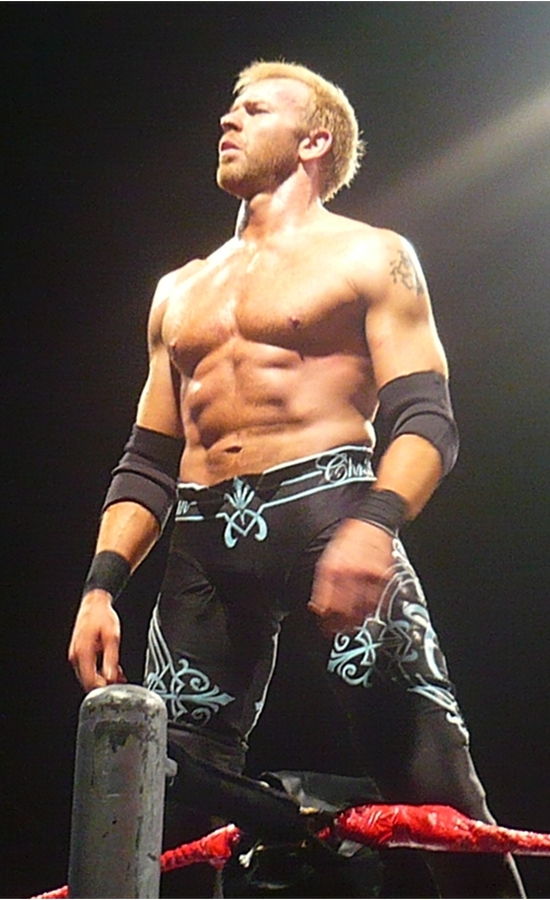
Christian at a WWE live event in April 2010

On the February 22 episode of Raw, Christian was announced to have re-signed with the Raw brand, defeating Carlito later that same night to gain entry into the Money in the Bank ladder match at WrestleMania XXVI on March 28, which he failed to win. Later, it was announced that he would be a Pro on NXT, mentoring NXT Rookie Heath Slater.

Christian was drafted back to the SmackDown brand by the WWE draft. On the May 7 episode of SmackDown, he was placed in an Intercontinental Championship tournament, defeating Cody Rhodes to get to the finals, where he lost to Kofi Kingston. On the July 2 episode of SmackDown, it was announced that Christian would compete in the SmackDown Money in the Bank ladder match at Money in the Bank on July 18, which he lost. In September 2010, Christian tore his pectoral muscle and was expected to be sidelined for approximately six months. Following surgery, WWE released a statement that revealed he was expected to only be sidelined for four months. The injury was put into a storyline with Alberto Del Rio attacking Christian backstage on the September 24 episode of SmackDown. Christian made his return from injury at Elimination Chamber on February 20, 2011, saving Edge from an attack by Del Rio. On the March 4 episode of SmackDown, Christian saved Edge from another attack by Del Rio. On the March 7 episode of Raw, Christian made his in-ring return from injury against Del Rio's bodyguard Brodus Clay, picking up the victory. On the March 11 episode of SmackDown, Christian reunited with Edge and defeated Del Rio and Clay in a tag team match. On the March 18 episode of SmackDown, Christian defeated Del Rio in a steel cage match, but was afterwards attacked by both Del Rio and Clay. Christian was in the corner of Edge when he retained the World Heavyweight Championship against Del Rio at WrestleMania XXVII on April 3.

On the April 8 episode of SmackDown, Christian lost to Del Rio in a number one contender's match for the World Heavyweight Championship after a distraction from Brodus Clay. After Edge's sudden retirement from wrestling on the April 15 episode of SmackDown, Christian won a 20-man battle royal to face Del Rio for the vacant World Heavyweight Championship at Extreme Rules on May 1, where Christian defeated Del Rio in a ladder match to win the World Heavyweight Championship for the first time. On the May 6 episode of SmackDown, Christian lost the World Heavyweight Championship to Randy Orton ending his reign at 2 days (5 recognized by WWE due to tape delay). At Over the Limit on May 22, Christian failed to regain the World Heavyweight Championship from Orton. On the June 3 episode of SmackDown, Christian was the special referee for a World Heavyweight Championship defence by Orton against Sheamus, which Orton won only to be hit by Christian after the match with the title belt, turning heel in the process. At Capitol Punishment on June 19, Christian faced Orton for the World Heavyweight Championship once again, but he failed to capture the title as the referee missed his foot under the bottom rope. At Money in the Bank on July 17, Christian won the World Heavyweight Championship for the second and final time after Orton was disqualified for kicking him in the groin (the stipulation was if Orton was disqualified or the referee made a bad call, he would lose the title). At SummerSlam on August 14, Christian lost the World Heavyweight Championship back to Orton in a No Holds Barred match. On the August 26 episode of SmackDown, special guest General Manager Bret Hart announced that Christian would face Orton in a steel cage match on the August 30 episode of SmackDown for the title, which Christian lost to end their feud.

Christian then began feuding with Sheamus, leading to two matches between the two at the Hell in a Cell on October 2 and Vengeance on October 23, both of which Christian lost. On the November 4 episode of SmackDown, Big Show performed a chokeslam on Christian and Christian received a storyline neck injury, preventing him from competing that night and starting to wear a neck brace. On November 9 during the WWE European Tour, Christian injured his ankle and was pulled from a traditional Survivor Series elimination tag team match at Survivor Series on November 20. In December, Christian briefly appeared at the Slammy Awards and Tribute to the Troops.

==== Championship pursuits and injuries (2012–2014) ====
In 2012, Christian won his fourth WWE Intercontinental Championship.

At Elimination Chamber on February 19, 2012, Christian returned from his injury to show support for John Laurinaitis. Christian appeared on the March 16 episode of SmackDown, hosting an episode of The Peep Show and given a spot on Laurinaitis' team in a 12-man tag match at WrestleMania XXVIII on April 1. On the March 26 episode of Raw SuperShow, Christian was injured once again after (kayfabe) re-aggravating his neck and shoulder in a match with CM Punk. Despite the injury, Christian still appeared at the WWE Hall of Fame ceremony to induct long-time friend Edge.

Christian made his return at Over the Limit on May 20, 2012, as a face, where he won a battle royal and defeated Cody Rhodes later in the show to win his fourth Intercontinental Championship. At No Way Out on June 17, Christian retained the Intercontinental Championship against Rhodes in a rematch. At Raw 1000 on July 23, Christian lost the Intercontinental Championship to The Miz ending his reign at 63 days and failed to regain it in a rematch the same week on SmackDown.

After a 10 month absence, Christian returned from injury on the June 17, 2013 episode of Raw, defeating Wade Barrett. At Money in the Bank on July 14, Christian competed in the WWE Championship Money in the Bank ladder match, but was unsuccessful as the match was won by Randy Orton. On the July 29 episode of Raw, Christian defeated World Heavyweight Champion Alberto Del Rio in a non-title match. That same week on SmackDown, Christian defeated Randy Orton and Rob Van Dam in a triple threat match to become number one contender to the World Heavyweight Championship, after which he was attacked by Del Rio during a post-match interview. On the August 9 episode of SmackDown, Christian again defeated Del Rio in a non-title match. At SummerSlam on August 18, Christian failed in his title challenge against Del Rio. On the September 9 episode of Raw, The Shield dragged out an assaulted Christian as a message to anyone that disrespected Triple H following Edge's opinion on Triple H's recent abuse of power. On that week's SmackDown, Edge promised Christian would return soon and get his payback. Christian returned and appeared on the 2013 Slammy Awards, where he presented an award and appeared in a segment involving John Cena and Randy Orton.

Christian returned on the January 31, 2014 episode of SmackDown to defeat Jack Swagger in a qualifying match for the Elimination Chamber match for the WWE World Heavyweight Championship. On the February 17 episode of Raw, Christian attacked Daniel Bryan from behind and mocked Bryan during the match, turning heel. At Elimination Chamber on February 23, Christian eliminated Sheamus before being eliminated by Daniel Bryan. On the March 24 episode of Raw, Christian won a fatal four-way match including Alberto Del Rio, Dolph Ziggler and Sheamus to challenge Big E for the Intercontinental Championship, which did not come to fruition due to Christian suffering a concussion.

==== First retirement and sporadic appearances (2014–2019) ====
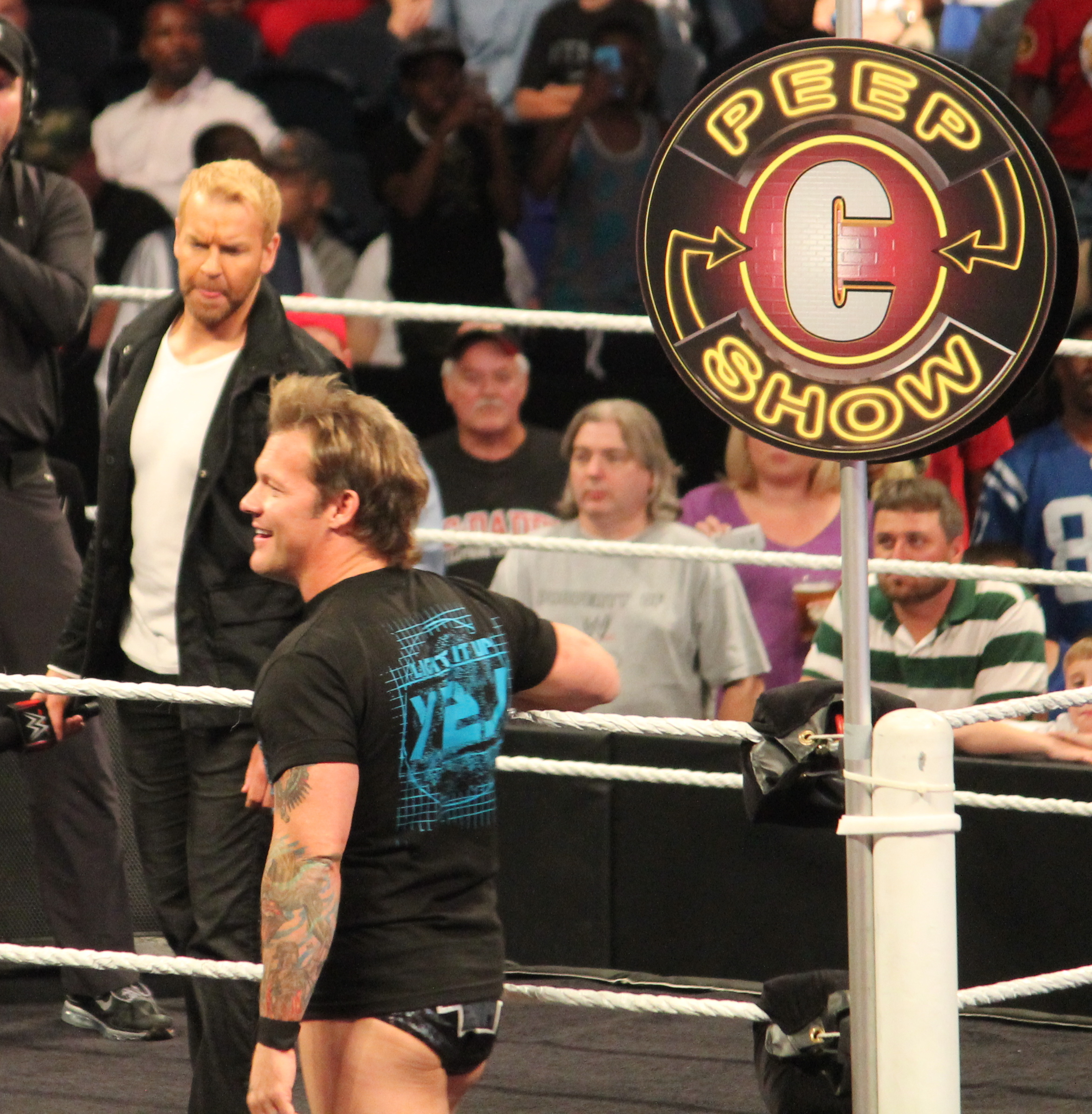
Christian hosting The Peep Show with guest Chris Jericho in September 2014

After suffering his concussion, Christian appeared as a face on pre-show discussion panels for WWE for events including NXT TakeOver, Money in the Bank and Battleground. He then went on to host The Peep Show program with Chris Jericho at Night of Champions in September, and with Dean Ambrose on the November 7 episode of SmackDown.

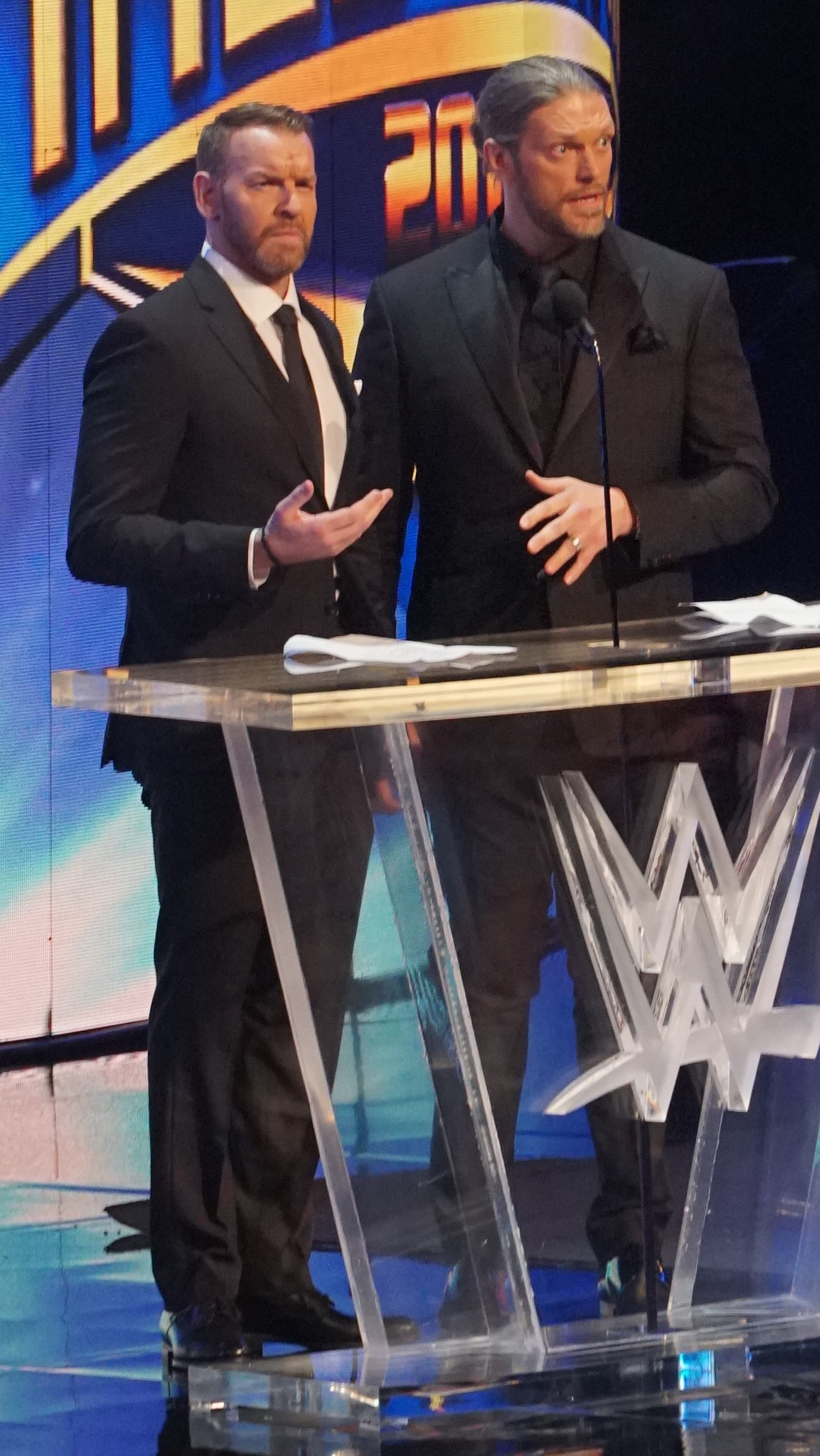
Christian and Edge at the WWE Hall of Fame ceremony in April 2018

Edge and Christian were the guest hosts for the December 29 episode of Raw, where WWE commentator Jerry Lawler referred to Christian as "retired". Pro Wrestling Insider corroborated Lawler's statement, adding that because of multiple concussions and other injuries, the company considered Christian retired as an active wrestler. On the March 2, 2016 episode of Talk Is Jericho, Christian said that while he has had no formal discussion with management regarding his retirement, he would be unlikely to wrestle again. He confirmed his status on the September 22, 2017 edition of E&C's Pod of Awesomeness, saying: "I had to retire, like, right around 40... 'cause of the concussion stuff".

Starting on February 21, 2016, Reso began appearing along with Edge in the WWE Network exclusive The Edge and Christian Show That Totally Reeks of Awesomeness, but in July 2017 it was announced that the show was cancelled from the Network. In mid-May 2016, it became known that Reso had been released from his talent contract. On the June 22, Talk Is Jericho podcast focusing on the Chris Benoit tragedy, Jericho mentioned Christian as an example of modern wrestlers who had to retire as the WWE would no longer give them medical clearances due to concussion related injuries (this was largely as a consequence of the Benoit incident as well as better knowledge of chronic traumatic encephalopathy (CTE) and other concussion related risks).

At the Raw 25 Years event on January 22, 2018, Christian hosted The Peep Show with special guests Jason Jordan and Seth Rollins, but it was later interrupted by The Bar (Cesaro and Sheamus). On April 7, Christian appeared with Edge to induct the Dudley Boyz into the WWE Hall of Fame. In October 2019, Christian started appearing as a regular contributor on WWE Backstage.

==== In-ring return and departure (2020–2021) ====
On the June 8, 2020 episode of Raw, Christian hosted The Peep Show with special guest Edge, who had returned to competition in January and was feuding with Randy Orton. The following week on Raw, Christian was challenged to an unsanctioned match by Orton. Christian, who had no offense in the match, quickly lost after a low blow from Ric Flair, which was followed by a punt kick from Orton. At Clash of Champions, Christian got revenge on Orton by attacking him during his ambulance match against Drew McIntyre for the WWE Championship. He then appeared as a surprise entrant in the 2021 Royal Rumble match, entering at number 24 and lasting over 18 minutes before being eliminated by Seth Rollins. During the match, he briefly reunited with Edge, who would eventually win by last eliminating Orton. Following this, it was reported that Reso was no longer under contract with WWE.

=== All Elite Wrestling (2021–present) ===
==== Storyline with Jungle Boy (2021–2023) ====
Reso made his surprise debut for All Elite Wrestling (AEW) as Christian Cage and signed a multi-year contract at Revolution on March 7, 2021. At Double or Nothing on May 30, Cage participated in the Casino Battle Royale, but he was the last competitor eliminated by the eventual winner Jungle Boy. Soon after, he would begin a partnership with Jungle Boy and become his mentor. Cage faced Kenny Omega, defeating him for the Impact World Championship on the premiere episode of Rampage on August 13, but losing at All Out in a match for the AEW World Championship, marking Cage's first loss in AEW. At the Revolution event on March 6, 2022, Cage competed in the Face of the Revolution ladder match for a future opportunity at the AEW TNT Championship, but the match was won by Wardlow.

On the June 15 special episode of Dynamite titled Road Rager, Cage attacked Jungle Boy after he and Luchasaurus lost the AEW World Tag Team Championship to The Young Bucks in a ladder match, turning heel for the first time in AEW. Cage would initiate a rivalry with Jungle Boy, mocking him for the death of his father, famed actor Luke Perry. Cage and Jungle Boy would face in a match at the All Out event on September 4, where Cage defeated Jungle Boy in 20 seconds after Luchasaurus attacked him and allied himself with Cage. Following this, it was revealed that Cage had suffered a triceps injury, which would render him unable to compete for the next six to nine months. Cage returned from his injury on the February 15, 2023 episode of Dynamite, attacking Jungle Boy. At Revolution, he was defeated by Jungle Boy in a Final Burial match, ending their rivalry.

==== The Patriarchy (2023–2025) ====
"Christian is phenomenal right now. He is literally doing some of the best work of his career, and he is currently one of the most entertaining things on either Collision OR Dynamite... A lot of younger heels really need to take the time to study what Christian is doing and replicate it in their own ways."

— David Bryant of Pro Wrestling Torch praising Cage's character in July 2023

At Double or Nothing on May 28, 2023, Cage lost to Wardlow in a ladder match for the AEW TNT Championship. Wardlow then lost the title to Luchasaurus, with Cage's help, on the premiere episode of Collision, on June 17. Cage then started a new storyline where he claimed to be the AEW TNT Champion and would carry the championship around with him, despite the actual champion being Luchasaurus. Cage's new character would receive acclaim from critics, audiences and other wrestlers; fellow AEW wrestler MJF opined that Cage was the "best he's been in his entire career". Cage and Luchasaurus would begin a feud with Darby Allin over the championship. On the August 23 edition of Dynamite, Cage was added to the tag team coffin match at All In, following AR Fox's removal from the Mogul Embassy, replacing Fox and teaming with Swerve Strickland to face Allin and Sting. On August 27 at All In, Cage and Strickland were defeated by Allin and Sting, who threw Strickland in the coffin to win the match. The following week at All Out on September 3, Cage helped Luchasaurus defeat Allin to retain the AEW TNT Championship. On the September 23 episode of Collision, Cage pinned Luchasaurus in a triple threat match (also involving Allin) to become the new AEW TNT Champion.

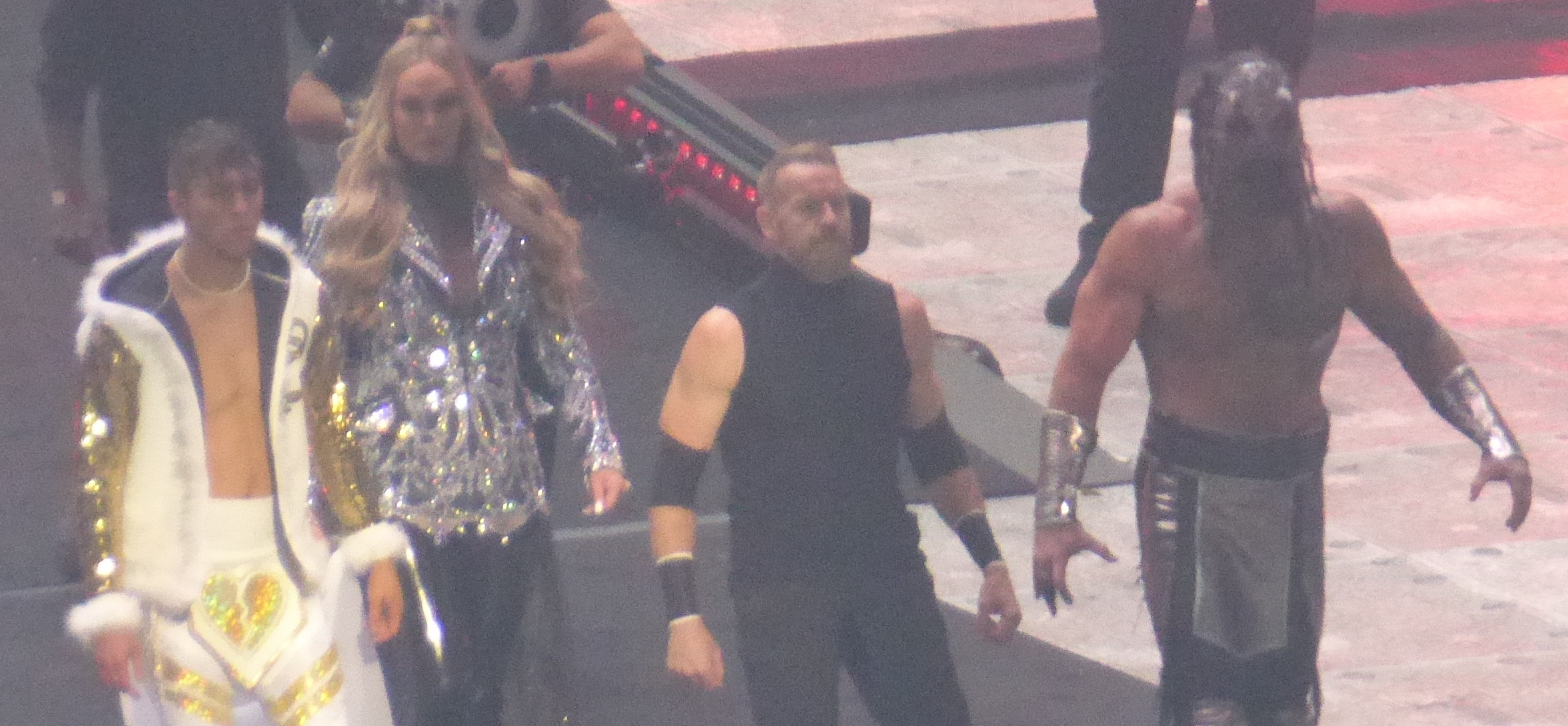
The Patriarchy in August 2024. From left to right: Nick Wayne, Mother Wayne, Cage, and Killswitch

At WrestleDream on October 1, 2023, Cage defeated Allin in a two out of three falls match to retain the AEW TNT Championship. After the match, Cage, Luchasaurus, and Nick Wayne (who turned on Allin) assaulted Allin and Sting; they were interrupted by the debuting Adam Copeland, known as Edge in WWE, who ran out to confront Cage and save Allin. Cage's faction was later called The Patriarchy, with Cage being recognized as "The Patriarch" of the faction. At Full Gear on November 18, The Patriarchy lost to Copeland, Sting and Allin in a six-man tag team match. On the following episode of Dynamite, Cage renamed Luchasaurus as Killswitch (after his finishing move) and Wayne as "The Prodigy" Nick Wayne. On the December 6 episode of Dynamite, Cage successfully defended the AEW TNT Championship against Copeland, after Shayna Wayne (Wayne's mother) hit Copeland with the title belt in retaliation for taking out Nick. On the December 23 episode of Collision, Cage accepted Copeland's challenge to a no disqualification match for the AEW TNT Championship at Worlds End on December 30, while announcing that Shayna Wayne had joined The Patriarchy as "The Matriarch" Mother Wayne. At Worlds End, Cage lost the title to Copeland, ending his reign at 98 days. Immediately after the match, Cage demanded and invoked Killswitch's AEW TNT Championship title shot (which Killswitch had won earlier that night) and defeated Copeland to win the AEW TNT Championship for the second time. On the March 20, 2024 episode of Dynamite, Cage lost the AEW TNT Championship to Copeland in an I Quit match, ending his second reign at 81 days and ending their six-month feud.

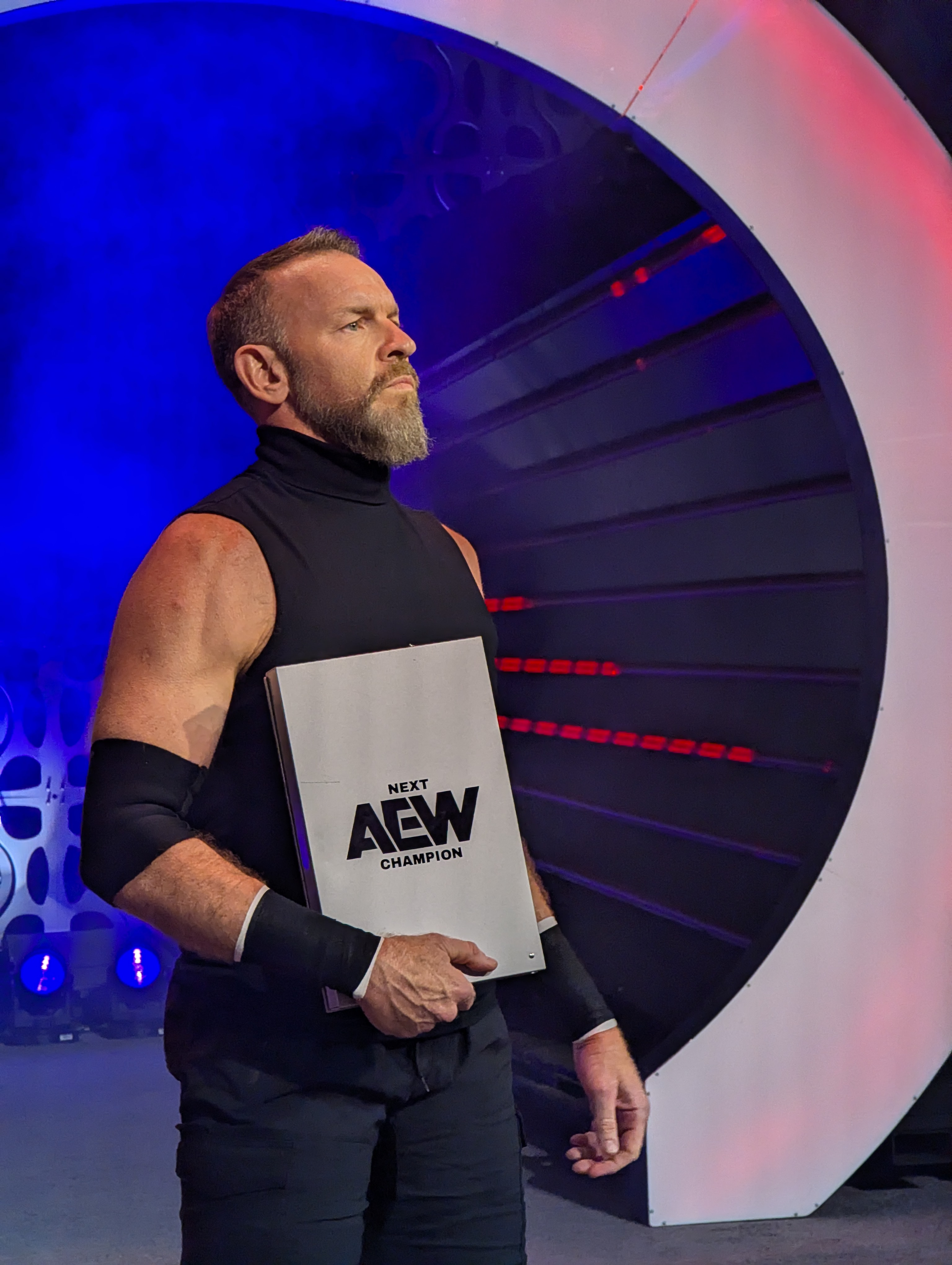
Cage in September 2024

On the May 1, 2024 episode of Dynamite, Cage returned from an almost two-month hiatus as the challenger for Swerve Strickland's AEW World Championship at Double or Nothing on May 26, where he failed to win the title from Strickland. On the June 15 episode of Collision, Cage declared that he would challenge for the AEW World Championship again but would first challenge for the AEW World Trios Championship with Killswitch and Wayne. On the July 21 episode of Collision, The Patriarchy defeated the Bang Bang Gang (Juice Robinson and The Gunns) for the vacant AEW World Trios Championship, after interference from Mother Wayne. This is Cage's first six-man tag team championship win of his career. On August 25 at All In, The Patriarchy lost the AEW World Trios Championship in a four-way London ladder match to Pac and Blackpool Combat Club (Claudio Castagnoli and Wheeler Yuta), ending their reign at 37 days. Later in the show, Cage won a Casino Gauntlet match to earn the right to challenge for the AEW World Championship whenever he wants. Two weeks later at All Out on September 7, Cage attempted to cash-in his AEW World Championship match contract on Bryan Danielson after Danielson successfully defended his title against Jack Perry but was blocked by the Blackpool Combat Club. On November 23 at Full Gear, Cage attempted to cash-in on champion Jon Moxley but would be blocked again, this time by Jay White. At Revolution on March 9, 2025, Cage cashed in his contract in the main event between Moxley and Adam Copeland (then known as "Cope") making it a three-way match but failed to win the title when he was choked out by Moxley.

==== Cage & Cope (2025–present) ====
On July 12, 2025 at All In, after Cage and Wayne failed to win the AEW World Tag Team Championship from The Hurt Syndicate (Bobby Lashley and Shelton Benjamin), Wayne turned on Cage and attacked him, thus disbanding The Patriarchy. Cage was saved by Adam Copeland, where the latter told the former to "go find himself," hinting at a face turn for Cage. On the August 13 episode of Dynamite, Cage saved Copeland from an attack by FTR (Cash Wheeler and Dax Harwood), Nick Wayne, and Kip Sabian. Copeland then embraced Cage and a tag match was announced between the duo and Wayne (later replaced by Killswitch) and Sabian on August 24 at Forbidden Door, where Cage and Copeland were victorious. After reuniting with Copeland, Cage would still keep his heel demeanor and goals, becoming a tweener in the process. At All Out on September 20, the team were victorious against FTR.

After a six-month absence due to Copeland filming season 3 of Percy Jackson and the Olympians, both Cage and Copeland returned at Revolution on March 15, 2026, where they attacked FTR (who had just retained their AEW World Tag Team Championship) and stared down The Young Bucks (Matt Jackson and Nick Jackson). After returning, the duo of Cage and Copeland began to be referred to as "Cage & Cope". On April 12 at Dynasty, Cage and Cope unsuccessfully challenged FTR for the tag titles, but defeated them at Double or Nothing on May 24 in an "I Quit" match to win the tag titles, thus ending their feud.. The duo would go on to successfully defend their titles at Forbidden Door on June 28 against The Dogs (David Finlay and Clark Connors), at Redemption on July 26 against the Death Riders (Claudio Castagnoli and Pac), and at All In on August 30 against The Young Bucks, only to lose them to the Young Bucks in a three-way ladder match also involving FTR at All Out ending their reign at 125 days. After All Out, it was revealed that Cage had suffered three broken ribs and a collapsed lung in the ladder match, leaving him out of action for an undisclosed amount of time.

== Professional wrestling style and persona ==
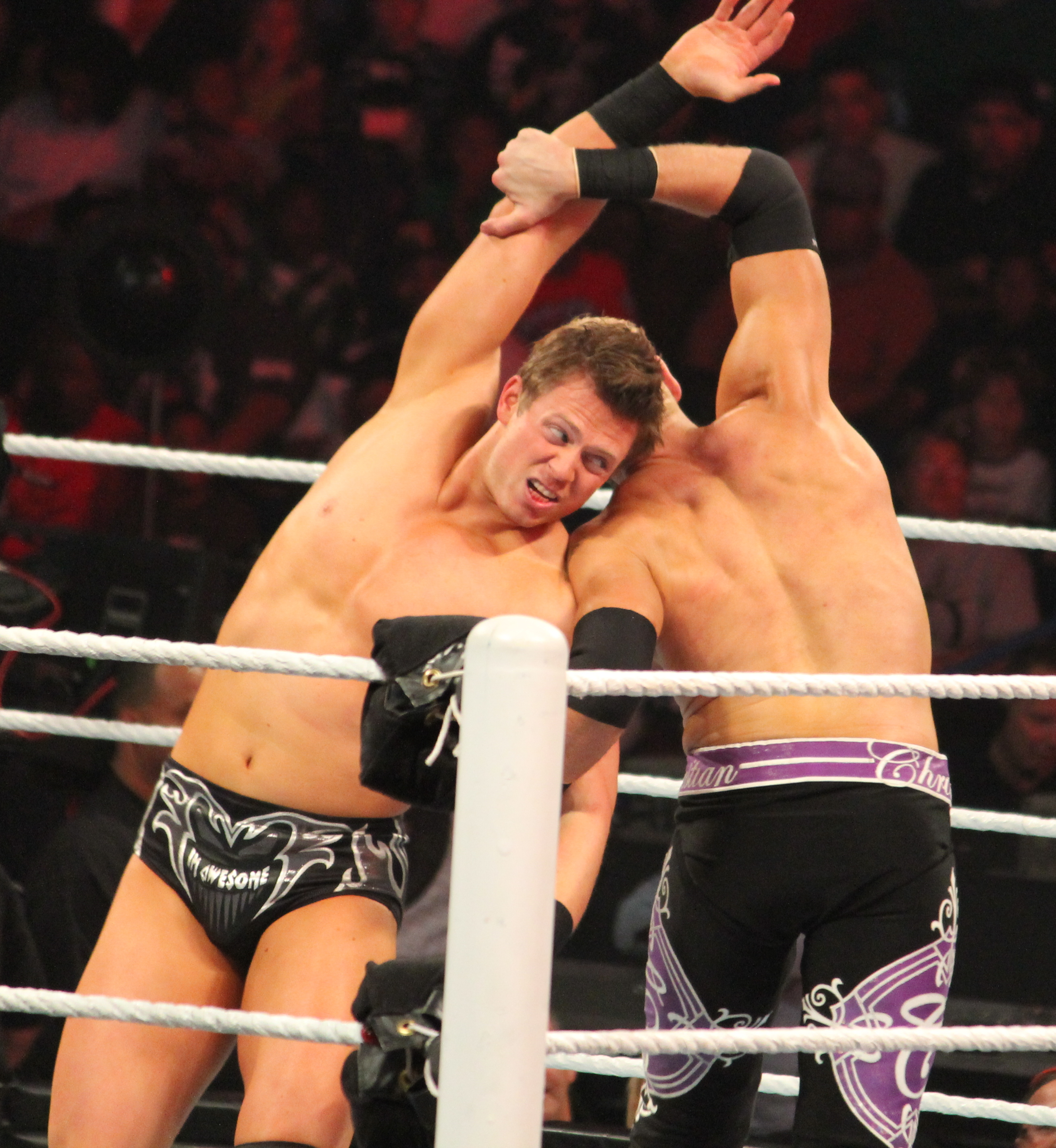
Christian setting up his finisher on The Miz in 2012

Like many prominent wrestlers with lengthy careers, Christian's character has evolved considerably over the years. When he debuted on the national stage, he was a scowling goth figure who never spoke. Ironically, he later became known for both his interview skills and, when a babyface, his humorous, fun-loving, surfer-type persona. As a heel, Christian is typically self-absorbed, caustic, vindictive and occasionally sadistic while still retaining quick wit.

Christian began to build up a loyal fanbase around the spring of 2005, despite his placement as a heel; he referred to them as his "Peeps", "Peepulation" (a play on the word "population"), or the "Christian Coalition". He also hosted a talk show segment called The Peep Show which sometimes gets co-hosted by Edge called The Cutting Edge Peep Show.

As a finisher, Christian uses an inverted double underhook facebuster, called the Killswitch (formerly known as the "Impaler" and the "Unprettier"). He also utilized a spear as tribute to his best friend Edge, as well as a frog splash in memory of Eddie Guerrero.

== Personal life ==
While on tour with the WWF in England, Reso met German model Denise Hartmann; they were married on May 25, 2001. In December 2013, Reso announced the birth of his daughter during the time he had taken off due to recurring post-concussive symptoms. On May 2, 2019, Hartmann filed for divorce from Reso. The divorce was finalized in January 2020.

== Multimedia ==
=== Film ===
Year	Title	Role	Notes
2007	Shoot 'Em Up	Senator's guard	
2007	Dark Rising	Ricky	
2009	Bloodstained Memoirs	Christian Cage	
2010	Medium Raw: Night of the Wolf	Officer Pete Gallant	
2018	SuperGrid	Kurtis	
2020	Cagefighter: Worlds Collide	Stephen Drake	Also executive producer

=== Television ===
Year	Title	Role	Notes
2006	Casino Cinema	Christian Cage	
2007	House	Christian Cage	Episode: season 3, episode 19
2014–15	Haven	McHugh	Season 5, 6 episodes
2017	Murdoch Mysteries	Leonard Stoker	Episode: season 11, episode 9
2019	Knight Fight	Host	8 episodes

=== Video games ===
Year	Title	Notes
1999	WWF Attitude	Video game debut
1999	WWF WrestleMania 2000	
2000	WWF SmackDown!	
2000	WWF No Mercy	
2000	WWF SmackDown! 2: Know Your Role	
2001	WWF With Authority!	
2001	WWF Road to WrestleMania	
2001	WWF SmackDown! Just Bring It	
2002	WWF Raw	
2002	WWE WrestleMania X8	
2002	WWE Road to WrestleMania X8	
2002	WWE SmackDown! Shut Your Mouth	
2003	WWE Crush Hour	
2003	WWE WrestleMania XIX	
2003	WWE Raw 2	
2003	WWE SmackDown! Here Comes the Pain	
2004	WWE Day of Reckoning	
2004	WWE Survivor Series	
2004	WWE SmackDown! vs. Raw	
	WWE WrestleMania 21	
2005	WWE Day of Reckoning 2	
2005	WWE SmackDown! vs. Raw 2006	
2008	TNA Wrestling	First non-WWE game
2008	TNA Impact!	
2009	WWE SmackDown vs. Raw 2010	
2010	WWE SmackDown vs. Raw 2011	
2011	WWE All Stars	
2011	WWE '12	
2012	WWE WrestleFest	
2012	WWE '13	
2013	WWE 2K14	
2014	WWE SuperCard	
2014	WWE 2K15	
2016	WWE 2K17	
2017	WWE Champions	
2017	WWE 2K18	
2018	WWE 2K19	
2019	WWE 2K20	
2020	WWE 2K Battlegrounds	
2023	AEW Fight Forever	

=== Other media ===
In 2007, TNA Home Video released a DVD titled The Instant Classic: Christian Cage, covering his beginnings in the independent circuit and other various subjects up to his second NWA World Heavyweight Championship reign. Reso is also the host of the DVD The Ladder Match 2: Crash and Burn. In September 2015, Edge and Christian were guests on the Stone Cold Steve Austin Podcast, which aired on the WWE Network. Edge and Christian were also the hosts and stars of a WWE Network sketch comedy series titled The Edge and Christian Show That Totally Reeks of Awesomeness, which had two seasons, the first of which aired from February to May 2016 with the second from November 2018 to February 2019.

Reso hosted a podcast with Copeland called E&C's Pod of Awesomeness from 2017 to 2019.

== Championships and accomplishments ==
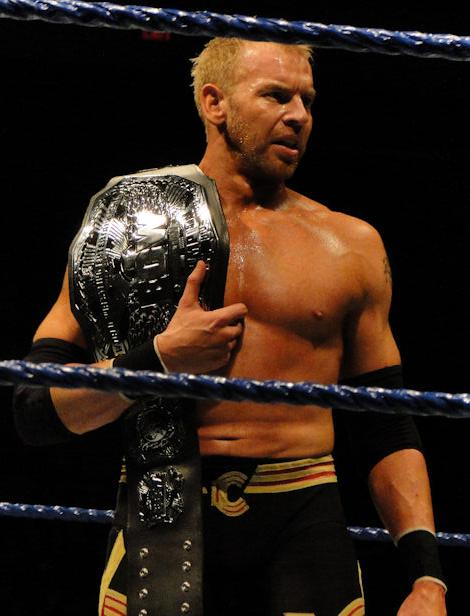
Cage was a two-time ECW Champion...

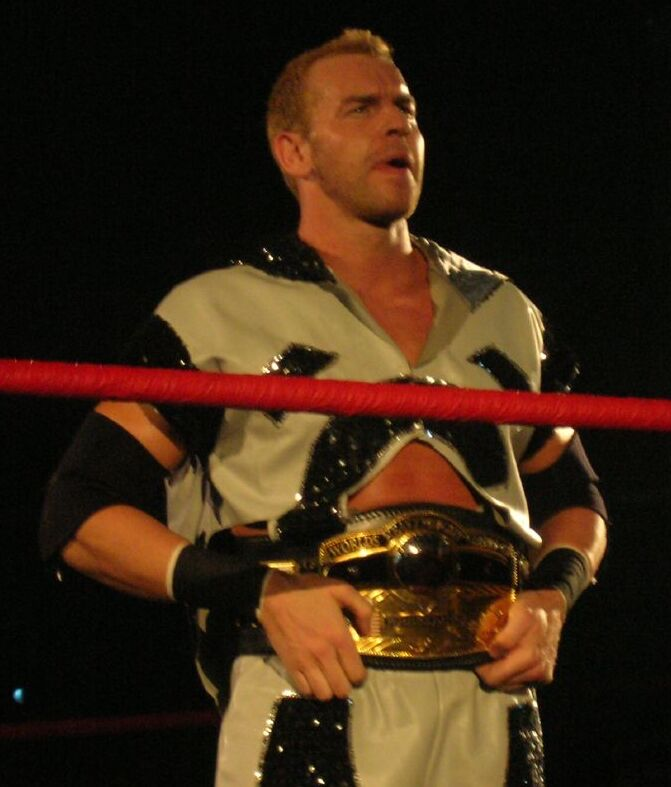
...a two-time NWA World Heavyweight Champion...

... and a two-time AEW TNT Champion.

- All Elite Wrestling
  - AEW TNT Championship (2 times)
  - AEW World Tag Team Championship (1 time) – with Adam Copeland
  - AEW World Trios Championship (1 time) – with Nick Wayne and Killswitch
  - Casino Gauntlet (2024)
- Canadian Pro-Wrestling Hall of Fame
  - Class of 2021 – Tag Team with Edge
  - Class of 2025 – Male Wrestler
- East Coast Wrestling Association
  - ECWA Heavyweight Championship (1 time)
- Insane Championship Wrestling
  - ICW Street Fight Tag Team Championship (1 time) – with Sexton Hardcastle
- International Wrestling Alliance
  - IWA Tag Team Championship (1 time) – with Earl the Orderly
- Pennsylvania Championship Wrestling
  - PCW Heavyweight Championship (1 time)
- Pro Wrestling Illustrated
  - Match of the Year (2000) with Edge vs. The Dudley Boyz and The Hardy Boyz in a triangle ladder match at WrestleMania 2000
  - Match of the Year (2001) with Edge vs. The Dudley Boyz and The Hardy Boyz in a Tables, Ladders and Chairs match at WrestleMania X-Seven
  - Ranked No. 7 of the top 500 singles wrestlers in the PWI 500 in 2007
  - Ranked No. 454 of the top 500 greatest wrestlers in the PWI Years in 2003
- Total Nonstop Action / Impact Wrestling
  - NWA World Heavyweight Championship (2 times)
  - Impact World Championship (1 time)
  - Gauntlet for the Gold (2008 – TNA World Heavyweight Championship)
  - TNA Year End Awards (2 times)
    - Memorable Moment of the Year (2005)
    - Who To Watch in 2006 (2005)
- Wrestling Observer Newsletter
  - Tag Team of the Year (2000) with Edge
  - Worst Worked Match of the Year (2006) TNA reverse battle royal on the October 26, 2006 episode of Impact!
- World Wrestling Federation / World Wrestling Entertainment / WWE
  - World Heavyweight Championship (2 times)
  - ECW Championship (2 times)
  - WWF/E Intercontinental Championship (4 times)
  - WWF European Championship (1 time)
  - WWF Hardcore Championship (1 time)
  - WWF Light Heavyweight Championship (1 time)
  - WWF/World Tag Team Championship (9 times) – with Edge (7), Lance Storm (1) and Chris Jericho (1)
  - 23rd Triple Crown Champion
  - 11th Grand Slam Champion
