= Casino Cinema =

Television series

Casino Cinema is a Spike programming block hosted by Steve Schirripa and Beth Ostrosky. The show, which was played around the commercial breaks of a film, featured the hosts (plus a guest player) teaching the audience how to play a casino game.

== Partial listing of guests featured on Casino Cinema ==
- Criss Angel
- Tobin Bell
- Tom Berenger
- Jordana Brewster
- Christian Cage
- David Cross
- Corey Feldman
- Forrest Griffin
- Artie Lange
- Method Man
- Jim Norton
- Grace Park
- Vincent Pastore
- Natalie Portman
- Dennis Rodman
- Kurt Russell
- M. Night Shyamalan
- Kevin Smith
- Shawnee Smith
- Scott Stapp
- Callie Thorne

== Partial listing of the films featured on Casino Cinema ==
- Bloodsport
- The Cutter
- Dr. No
- Drop Zone
- Fight Club
- For Your Eyes Only
- Ghost Ship
- Hot Shots! Part Deux
- Kickboxer
- Lethal Weapon
- Lethal Weapon 2
- Point Break
- Red Dawn
- Rocky IV
- Sin City
- Sniper (1993)
- Super Troopers
- The Texas Chainsaw Massacre (2003)
- Today You Die
- Top Gun

== See also ==
- Dinner and a Movie (similar program on TBS)
