= Beans and Corn Bread =

"Beans and Corn Bread" is a 1949 jump blues song by Louis Jordan and His Tympany Five, released by Decca. It was written by Jordan under his wife's name, Fleecie Moore, and Fred B. Clark.

It is used as the theme song for the TBS program Dinner and a Movie as well as being featured in the 1992 film Malcolm X.

"Beans and Cornbread" was also the traditional meal served to NASA launch crews following a successful Space Shuttle launch. The tradition was begun on April 12, 1981, by NASA test director Norm Carlson and was continued after every successful launch.

== See also ==
- Beanz N Kornbread
