= Monkey-ed Movies =

- Written by: Tom Stern; Tim Burns
- Directed by: Tom Stern
- Country of origin: United States
- Original language: English

Production
- Producer: Palomar Pictures
- Running time: 00:01:20 approx.

Original release
- Network: TBS
- Release: February 1, 1998

Monkey-ed Movies is a series of short films broadcast on the Turner Broadcasting System in the late 1990s. The films parodied popular films or television programs that were currently being broadcast on TBS with the use of costumed chimpanzees and orangutans voiced by human actors.

Ray Richmond of Variety noted that Monkey-ed Movies "proved to be clever stuff, in large part because it was short and sweet. It was just an irreverent little diversion made terrific by some dedicated training and impressive mimicry."

== History ==
The idea for the series came from a five-minute pilot that originally aired on MTV. TBS ordered 48 segments to be produced which were run during Dinner and a Movie and in odd time slots after sporting events. However, one day when a golf tournament ran short, the station played about half an hour of Monkey'ed Movies to unexpected results. The ratings actually increased, which prompted TBS to order 13 episodes of an expanded half-hour series which would become The Chimp Channel.

== Production ==
The American Humane Association's Film and Television Unit monitored the filming of Monkey-ed Movies, and reported:

"The chimps and orangutans are receiving a very high standard of care. The trainers use modern, humane techniques to cue and motivate the animals. . . The TBS production team has been very cooperative, has upheld the Guidelines and insures the wellbeing [sic] of the chimps during filming."

== Television show ==
In 1999, TBS spun the popular Monkey-ed Movies series into a situation comedy entitled The Chimp Channel. The series lasted only one season and met with negative reviews criticizing its attempt to expand the already effective Monkey-ed Movies concept. The series featured a segment called Movies on Film where two critics reviewed films from the Monkey-ed Movies library and gave a non-opposable thumbs up or down.

== List of Monkey-ed Movies shorts ==
- A Few Good Men
- Air Force One
- Alien
- Apollo 13 (two different versions)
- As Good as It Gets
- Austin Powers: International Man of Mystery
- Boogie Nights
- Braveheart
- Braves Baseball
- Caligula
- Dances with Wolves
- Die Hard
- Dinner and a Movie
- Dumb and Dumber
- The Empire Strikes Back (two different versions)
- Evita
- The Full Monty
- Forrest Gump
- The Fugitive
- Ghost
- The Godfather
- Gone with the Wind
- Good Will Hunting
- In & Out
- Interview with the Vampire
- James Bond (two different versions)
- Jaws (two different versions)
- Jerry Maguire
- L.A. Confidential
- The Lost World
- Men in Black
- Mission Impossible
- NASCAR Racing
- Planet of the Humans, a parody of Planet of the Apes
- Raiders of the Lost Ark
- Scream
- Steel Magnolias
- Terminator 2: Judgment Day (two different versions)
- Thelma & Louise
- Tin Cup
- Titanic
- Top Gun
- Twister
- Ultra Chimps (promo)
- WCW
- When Harry Met Sally...
