= The Chimp Channel =

- Genre: Sitcom; Parody
- Written by: Neil Alsip; Tim Burns
- Directed by: Brad Morrison; Corky Quakenbush
- Voices of: Daran Norris; Jennifer Hale; Richard Doyle; Maurice LaMarche; Mindy Cohn; Michael Donovan
- Country of origin: United States
- Original language: English
- No. of seasons: 1
- No. of episodes: 13

Production
- Executive producer: Tony Shiff
- Producer: Skot Bright
- Production locations: Burbank, California, United States
- Running time: 30 minutes
- Production companies: Telescopic Pictures; Warner Bros. Domestic Pay TV Cable & Network Features

Original release
- Network: TBS
- Release: June 10 – December 16, 1999

Related
- Monkey-ed Movies

The Chimp Channel is an American television sitcom that aired on TBS Superstation from June 10 to December 16, 1999. Based on TBS's Monkey-ed Movies interstitials, the series features costumed chimpanzees and orangutans, voiced by human actors, parodying popular television shows, films, and advertising. The Chimp Channel was the first all-simian series since ABC's Saturday morning Lancelot Link, Secret Chimp, which ended in 1972.

== Premise ==
The series revolves around the behind-the-scenes antics of the fictional, eponymous cable network The Chimp Channel (abbreviated TCC). Television programs included NYPD Zoo, Treewatch, Ally McSqeal, The Murray Price Show, News at Night, and Movies on Film. The latter had two critics reviewing films from the Monkey-ed Movie library with a non-opposable thumbs up or down. Due to the show's racy humor, it earned a TV-14 rating.

== Background and production history ==
In 1998, TBS aired Tom Stern's Monkey-ed Movies. Forty-eight of the short segments were produced to run during the feature-film program Dinner and a Movie and in odd time slots after sporting events. However, one day when a golf tournament ran short, the station played about half an hour of Monkey'ed Movies to unexpected results. The ratings actually increased, which prompted TBS to order 13 episodes of an expanded half-hour series. Aiming for a young male audience, TBS placed The Chimp Channel on Thursday nights at 10:05 p.m. ET following the network's top-rated professional wrestling show WCW Thunder. An April 1999 press release noted the series' original title as Channel of the Apes. The renamed Chimp Channel debuted on June 10, 1999.

Not long into production, Stern found himself at odds with TBS management regarding the direction of the series. This led to an incident on March 8, 1999, in which he improvised a raunchy performance art piece that involved full nudity and breaking two liquor bottles on the show's set. Stern was promptly fired for the incident despite claiming that he had permission from network officials to do what he called "improv comedy" described as "trying to get stuff off my chest about the wrong-headed direction the show was taking."

On June 9, one day before the Chimp Channel series premiere, Stern filed a breach-of-contract suit against TBS, Warner Bros. Domestic Pay TV, Telescopic Pictures, and Palomar Pictures in Los Angeles, seeking damages in excess of $1,675,000. Stern was represented in the suit by Los Angeles attorney David Wall. Production of the series continued for a few more months without its creative founder.

Filming of The Chimp Channel required a reportedly critical sensitivity regarding its animal cast. In attempt to avoid any performance hampering or distraction, studio personnel and visitors were instructed not to mingle with, make gestures toward, or make eye contact with the chimps. Brief scenes required strenuous rehearsal before filming could begin, and all personnel not required for immediate set consulting, including the director, viewed the shooting from monitors 50 feet away. Regarding the apes' behavior on set, Tom Stern quipped "Maggie, [the chimp] who plays Marina, loves the Lycra suit she wears and can't refrain from going to the bathroom in it — she thinks it's just a really cool red diaper. All the chimps wear diapers, though, so it's a lot like Frasier."

The ape performances were coached by off-screen trainers using signals to communicate with them. This made shooting more than two chimps at once difficult, so high-tech editing was used to multiply the number of apes in the frame. And since they couldn't always follow the script perfectly, the apes' reactions were cataloged and often edited together to create cohesive scenes. Regarding the unpredictability of the apes, co-executive producer Tim Burns noted, "They're a comedy writer's best friend. I think the stuff is funny to begin with, but there's no replacing how much funnier it is when the monkeys add their own peculiar performance style."

The American Humane Association's Film and Television Unit supervised the filming of both The Chimp Channel and its predecessor, Monkey-ed Movies, and reported:

"The chimps and orangutans are receiving a very high standard of care. The trainers use modern, humane techniques to cue and motivate the animals. . . The TBS production team has been very cooperative, has upheld the Guidelines and insures the wellbeing [sic] of the chimps during filming." AHA field representative Netta Bank rated the crew's treatment of the apes "A-plus" and noted "This is all chimps, all the time, so they're treated like stars. . . They have their own dressing room, their own green room. They have a play area for themselves."

== Characters ==
=== On-camera stars ===
- Brock Hammond (voiced by Daran Norris) is a 39-year-old male actor fitting the self-absorbed, masculine archetype, similar to David Hasselhoff.
- George W. Heinlein (voiced by Richard Doyle) is The Chimp Channel's veteran news anchor.
- Marina (voiced by Jennifer Hale) is a parody of Pamela Anderson, the "super sexy" blond actress from Treewatch.
- Murray Price (voiced by Eugene Roche) is the "undisputed king of all celebrity interviews," a parody of Larry King who hosts his own talk show. He is played by an orangutan.

=== Behind the scenes stars ===
- Bernard the Sarcastic Parrot (voiced by Maurice LaMarche) is the parrot sidekick of Harry.
- Bif & Stan (voiced by Michael Donovan and Dwight Schultz) are veteran writing team who provide material for a plethora of television genres.
- Ford Carter (voiced by Richard Doyle) is a 58-year-old, Australian, self-made "gazillionaire" who owns The Chimp Channel in addition to newspapers, hotel chains, and other properties. He shares traits with Rupert Murdoch, a long-standing media rival of Ted Turner's.
- Timmy Briar (voiced by Richard Steven Horvitz) is a young, bright-eyed intern at The Chimp Channel.
- Harry Waller (voiced by Maurice LaMarche) is the 52-year-old president of The Chimp Channel and a television veteran.
- Candy Yuponce (voiced by Mindy Cohn) is The Chimp Channel's makeup and wardrobe girl.

== Episodes ==
| No. | Title | Original release date |
|---|---|---|
| 1 | "Timmy's First Day" | June 10, 1999 |
| 2 | "Murray Loves Marina" | June 17, 1999 |
| 3 | "The Chase" | June 24, 1999 |
| 4 | "Brock's a Movie Star" | July 1, 1999 |
| 5 | "Zazz!" | July 15, 1999 |
| 6 | "Telethon" | July 22, 1999 |
| 7 | "The Computer" | September 2, 1999 |
| 8 | "When Harry Was Sally" | September 9, 1999 |
| 9 | "Stolen Memories: TCC Anniversary" | September 16, 1999 |
| 10 | "Marina's Wedding" | September 23, 1999 |
| 11 | "Y' Win Son, Y' Lose Son" | October 7, 1999 |
| 12 | "Dead Like Me" | October 14, 1999 |
| 13 | "The Briar Witch Project" | December 16, 1999 |

== Reception ==
While the training and animal work was commended, The Chimp Channel received largely negative critical reception with the notion that it fails its attempt to expand the simple, effective concept of Monkey-ed Movies. The New York Times' Caryn James gave a negative review, stating "The Chimp Channel is so scattershot and predictable it becomes tiresome in about five minutes. . . And the brief parodies of television shows and movies offer mere glimpses of wit."

Ray Richmond of Variety described how the original Monkey-ed Movies "proved to be clever stuff, in large part because it was short and sweet" but "with Chimp Channel, TBS monkeys with an undeniably thin concept and stretches it past the limit." While he commended the "sharp, well-organized direction from Mitchell Walker and the uncannily effective animal work from head trainer Bob Dunn, coordinator Mike Morris and their team," Richmond added "What seems cute in small doses feels awfully humiliating in this expanded format, sucking out any novelty and leaving in its wake only the uncomfortable entrails."

Tom Jicha of the Sun-Sentinel claimed "The Chimp Channel sounds a lot funnier than it turns out to be on the air. As an occasional brief skit on a show like Saturday Night Live or MADtv, The Chimp Channel might be entertaining." However, Jicha also provided additional insight into the series' predicament, pondering "TBS seems to have it's [sic] days and nights confused. Cleaned up of its occasional randy references - there's even a snarky shot at Monica Lewinsky - The Chimp Channel might work for the audience at 10 in the morning on Saturday. At 10 at night on Thursdays it's a King Kong-sized loser."

Fan reception appears to be somewhat more positive; as of 2010, The Chimp Channel holds an 8.2/10 rating on the Internet Movie Database and 6.2 "Fair" on TV.com.

== In popular culture ==
The show was promoted during time trials for the 1999 Coca-Cola 600 by commentator Ken Squier, who, after reading the promo, was jokingly non-verbally referred to as a chimp by broadcasting partners Buddy Baker and Dick Berggren.

== See also ==
- Chimp Lips Theater, a pair of pilots also featuring live chimpanzees with a similar premise that aired on Fox Kids in 1997.
