= Beth Ostrosky Stern =

American actress and model (born 1972)

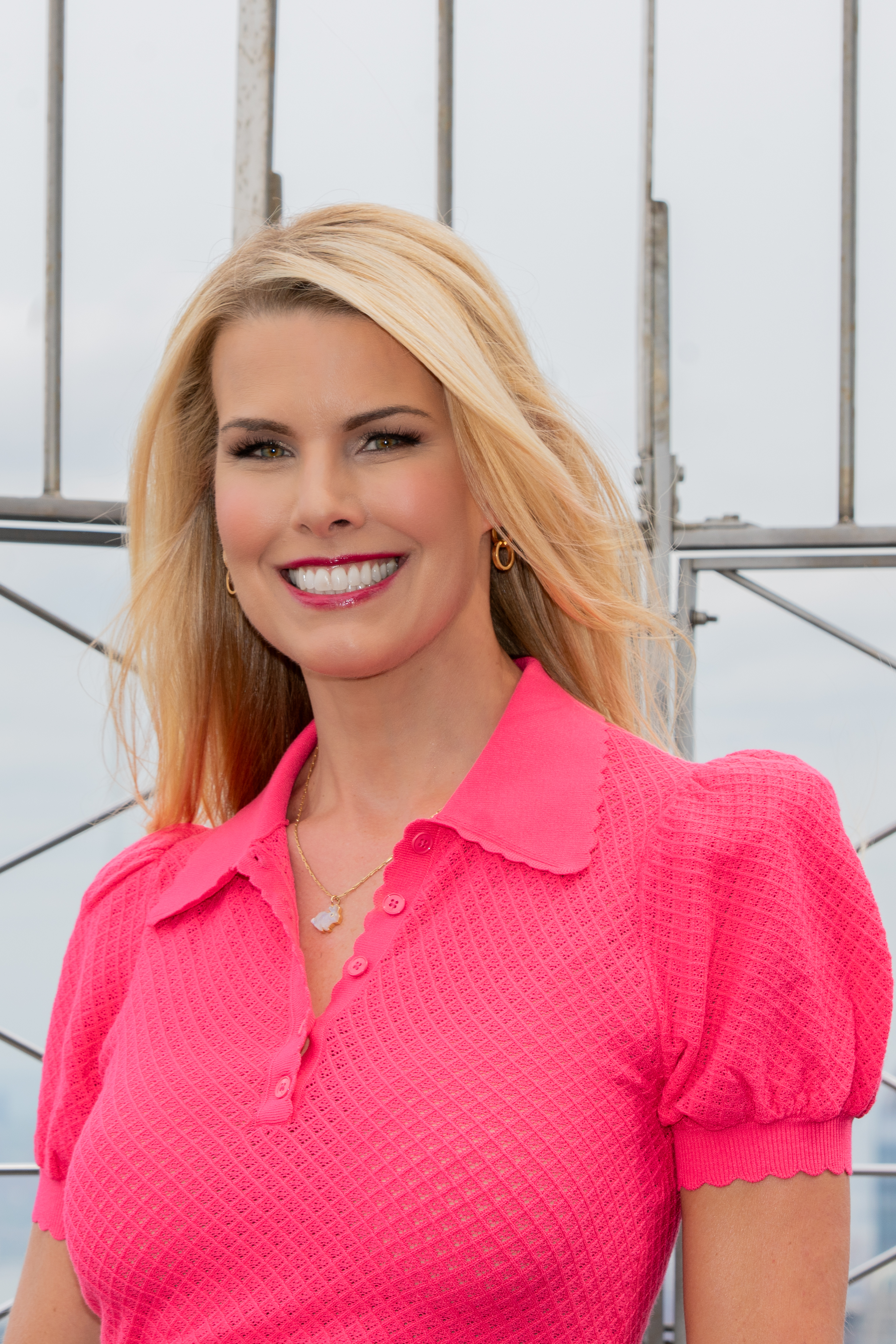
- Stern in 2026
- Born: Beth Ostrosky; July 15, 1972 (age 54); Pittsburgh, Pennsylvania, U.S.
- Occupations: Author, model, animal-rights activist
- Years active: 1996–present
- Spouse: Howard Stern (m. 2008)

Beth Ostrosky Stern (born July 15, 1972) is an American actress, author, model, and animal rights activist.

== Early life ==
Beth Ostrosky was born in Pittsburgh, Pennsylvania. Her mother, Judy (née Jarema), is a former model and her father, Robert Ostrosky, is a dentist. Stern was raised Roman Catholic. She has two brothers.

Stern attended Fox Chapel High School in suburban Fox Chapel, Pennsylvania, and took classes for three years at the University of Pittsburgh before leaving to pursue a modeling career in New York City.

== Career ==
Stern received her first noticeable role as one of the daughters of Ben Stiller's supposed birth parents in the 1996 film Flirting with Disaster. She played a more prominent role four years later in the film Whipped, with Amanda Peet. Stern has also appeared on television, appearing in the final season of G4 show Filter, and the Spike TV series Casino Cinema.

She has appeared in her own line of calendars, as well as on the covers of several magazines, including three times on FHM. Votes from the readers of For Him Magazine ("FHM") placed Stern among FHM's 100 Sexiest Women of the Year in 2002, 2003, 2004, and 2007( #76). AskMen.com placed Stern 96th in its list of the Most Desirable Women for 2007.

In 2010, Stern authored Oh My Dog: How to Choose, Train, Groom, Nurture, Feed, and Care for Your New Best Friend, which reached #5 on The New York Times Best Seller list of paperback advice books. In 2014, she wrote the children's book Yoda: The Story of a Cat and his Kittens, which tells the story of a Persian cat with a heart condition that she and her husband adopted. She released a sequel, Yoda Gets a Buddy, the following year. Proceeds from both books went to support Bianca's Furry Friends, a 14,000-square-foot, cage-free animal shelter at the North Shore Animal League, named after the couple's deceased bulldog.

Stern hosted the short-lived National Geographic reality television show Spoiled Rotten Pets in 2013. Later that year, she was named as the host of the first annual Kitten Bowl, a Super Bowl counterprogramming special on the Hallmark Channel which, as of 2019, has continued to air annually with Stern as a cast member.

== Personal life ==
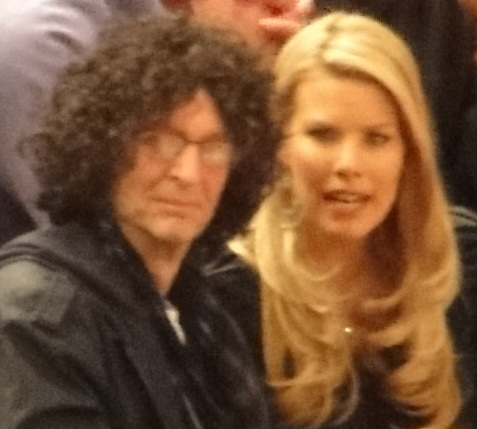
Howard and Beth Stern in 2011

Radio personality Howard Stern, who is 18 years her senior, proposed to Beth Ostrosky on February 13, 2007, after seven years of dating. The couple married at Le Cirque restaurant in New York City on October 3, 2008, in a ceremony officiated by actor Mark Consuelos. As of 2019, the Sterns primarily reside in the Town of Southampton on Long Island, though they also own homes in Manhattan and in Palm Beach, Florida.

Beth Stern maintains dedicated "foster rooms" in all three of her residences for cats and kittens in need of permanent homes, a project she began in 2013. That same year, she launched a personal Instagram account which soon became focused on the animals in her care. As of 2019, it has more than half a million followers and has helped Stern to facilitate roughly 1,000 adoptions.
