= Norman Smiley =

British professional wrestler

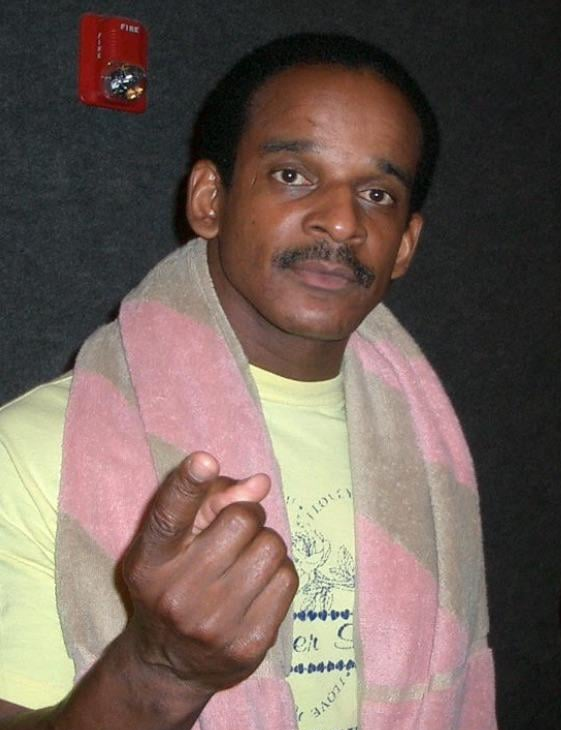
- Smiley in 2003

Personal information
- Born: Norman Anthony Smiley; 28 February 1965 (age 61) Northampton, England

Professional wrestling career
- Ring names: Black Magic; Lord Henry Norman; Norman Smiley
- Billed height: 6 ft 2 in (188 cm)
- Billed weight: 240 lb (109 kg)
- Billed from: London, England
- Trained by: Karl Gotch; Boris Malenko; Dean Malenko
- Debut: 1985
- Retired: 2008

Norman Anthony Smiley (born 28 February 1965) is an English-American retired professional wrestler who is employed by WWE as a trainer for NXT, and signed to a WWE Legends deal. He is best known for his appearances with the Mexican promotion Consejo Mundial de Lucha Libre (CMLL) from 1991 to 1995 and with the American promotion World Championship Wrestling (WCW) from 1997 to 2001. Championships held by Smiley over the course of his career include the CMLL World Heavyweight Championship and the WCW Hardcore Championship.

== Early life ==
Smiley was born in Northampton, England. In the early 1970s, his parents divorced and Smiley and his mother emigrated to Miami, Florida. Smiley attended Miami Beach Senior High School, where he took part in amateur wrestling and powerlifting. He graduated in 1984.

== Professional wrestling career ==
=== Early career (1985–1991) ===
Norman Smiley trained under Boris Malenko and Dean Malenko before making his debut in 1985 on the Floridian independent circuit. He was originally known as "Black Magic", then as the hated "Lord Henry Norman". Smiley wrestled in Japanese shoot-style group the Universal Wrestling Federation in 1988 and 1989. In 1990 Smiley competed at the World Championship Wrestling Starrcade '90: Collision Course pay-per-view, teaming with Chris Adams against Konnan and Rey Misterio.

=== Consejo Mundial de Lucha Libre (1991–1997) ===
In 1991, he began wrestling for Consejo Mundial de Lucha Libre in Mexico as "Black Magic", winning the CMLL World Heavyweight Championship and holding it until losing to Brazo de Plata in 1993.

=== Extreme Championship Wrestling (1995–1996) ===
In 1995 and 1996, he briefly competed in the Philadelphia, Pennsylvania-based Extreme Championship Wrestling promotion.

=== World Championship Wrestling (1997–2001) ===
==== Early years (1997–1999) ====
Smiley signed with World Championship Wrestling (WCW) in 1997, making his debut on a television taping of Pro by defeating Manny Fernandez on 9 October 1997. Smiley made his televised debut and first pay-per-view appearance at the World War 3 event on 23 November, competing in the titular battle royal; however the match was won by Scott Hall. After being removed from television, he returned on the 9 February 1998, episode of Nitro, with a new gimmick, which saw him perform his signature dance move, the "Big Wiggle". However, in his return match, he would be defeated by Konnan. Smiley received his first title shot in WCW on the 8 June episode of Nitro as he unsuccessfully challenged Fit Finlay for the World Television Championship. At Fall Brawl, Smiley faced Ernest Miller in a losing effort.

Smiley turned heel in a backstage interview on the 19 December episode of Saturday Night, where he mocked the fans for saying his name incorrectly. At Starrcade, he defeated Prince Iaukea. He then feuded with Chavo Guerrero Jr., on one occasion destroying Guerrero's hobby horse mascot, Pepè, by feeding it into a wood chipper on the 11 January 1999, episode of Nitro. This culminated in a match between the two at Souled Out on 17 January, which Smiley won.

==== Hardcore Champion (1999–2001) ====
In late 1999, Smiley entered the hardcore division. He participated in a tournament for the vacant WCW World Heavyweight Championship, in which he defeated Bam Bam Bigelow in the opening round in a hardcore match on the 25 October episode of Nitro before losing to Billy Kidman in a hardcore match in the second round on 1 November. Smiley would go on to become the inaugural title holder of the WCW Hardcore Championship by defeating Brian Knobbs in a tournament final at Mayhem on 21 November. During his run with the championship, he would adopt the nickname 'Screamin', due to constantly screeching in a high-pitched tone during his matches, because of his fear of weapons. He would also often wear protective sports equipment as he entered the ring, usually also in the uniform of a local pro or collegiate sports team to gain a cheap pop. He successfully defended the title against The Wall, Rhonda Sing and Fit Finlay while also retaining the title against Meng at Starrcade. Smiley unsuccessfully challenged Jeff Jarrett for the United States Heavyweight Championship in a Bunkhouse Brawl on 6 January 2000, episode of Thunder. The following week, on Thunder, Smiley lost the Hardcore Championship to Knobbs, which he failed to regain at Souled Out in a fatal four-way match also involving Fit Finlay and Meng.

Smiley would then begin feuding with 3 Count, competing against the trio in a handicap match at SuperBrawl 2000, which Smiley lost. At Uncensored, Smiley teamed with The Demon to defeat XS (Lane and Rave) in a tag team match. On the 10 April episode of Nitro, all the WCW titles were declared vacant and the promotion was re-booted in storyline. At Spring Stampede, Smiley faced Terry Funk in a hardcore match for the vacant Hardcore Championship, which Funk won. Smiley would continue to feud with Funk over the title and recruited Chris Jericho's former associate Ralphus to be his manager. With the assistance of Ralphus, he stole a backyard wrestling championship from a group of children during a vignette. Smiley and Ralphus unsuccessfully challenged Funk for the title in handicap matches at Slamboree and the following night's edition of Nitro. On the 23 May episode of Nitro, Smiley teamed with Funk to challenge Shane Douglas for the title in a handicap match, which Funk won. Smiley would then continue to pursue the Hardcore Championship as he unsuccessfully challenged Big Vito and Lance Storm for the title on various occasions.

On the 14 August episode of Nitro, Smiley defeated newly crowned champion Carl Ouellet to win his second Hardcore Championship. He successfully defended the title against KroniK in a handicap match on the 21 August episode of Nitro and MI Smooth in an "I Quit" match on the 23 August episode of Thunder. Smiley was stripped off the title by the WCW Commissioner Mike Sanders on the 27 September episode of Nitro. Smiley made his final pay-per-view appearance in WCW at Millennium Final, where he participated in an 18-man battle royal which he failed to win. Later that night, he defeated Fit Finlay in an Octoberfest Hardcore match.

Smiley's final angle in WCW took place in early 2001, where he was placed with the returning Glacier in comedic skits where he was supposed to aid Smiley in his matches but took his time coming to the ring in order to interact with fans. He then entered the ring after the fact to pose for the fans before pushing Smiley out of the way to perform his old kata routine. This would lead to Smiley losing his match. Smiley remained in WCW until the company was sold to the World Wrestling Federation in March 2001. He was not hired by the WWF following the sale.

=== Independent circuit (2001–2008) ===
After WCW, Smiley wrestled for the short-lived X Wrestling Federation and the World Wrestling All-Stars before returning to the independent circuit.

=== NWA Total Nonstop Action (2002, 2006–2007) ===
He wrestled briefly for NWA Total Nonstop Action in 2002 and then had several tryout matches with WWE in 2003 and 2004. In February 2006, he was backstage during the TNA pay-per-view Against All Odds 2006, and he wrestled in an eight-man opening match on an episode of TNA Impact! shortly thereafter, doing the Big Wiggle on Jeff Jarrett. At TNA Destination X 2006, Smiley and Shark Boy lost to David Young and Elix Skipper. on the 18 March episode of Impact, Smiley and Shark Boy defeated The Latin American Xchange (Homicide and Machete). on the 8 April episode of Impact, Smiley and Shark Boy competed against Elix Skipper and David Young with the match ending in a no contest when Jeff Jarrett's Army (Jeff Jarrett, Scott Steiner, and America's Most Wanted) attacked all four men and Smiley was inactive for several weeks following an attack at the hands of Scott Steiner, but returned on the 29 June episode of Impact!, losing to Monty Brown. on the 13 July episode of Impact, Smiley lost to Abyss. on the 7 September episode of Impact, Smiley, Shark Boy and The James Gang lost to America's Most Wanted, Matt Bentley and Kazarian. on the 5 October episode of Impact, Smiley competed in a fatal five-way match which was won by Shark Boy. on the 19 October episode of Impact, Smiley lost to Christian Cage in a street fight. At Bound for Glory, Smiley competed in Open Invitational X Division Gauntlet battle royal which was won by Austin Starr. On the 16 February 2007, episode of Impact! Smiley made his return, teaming with Shark Boy in a loss to The Latin American Xchange (Homicide and Machete) this tag team match would turn out to be Smiley's final match with TNA.

=== WWE (2007–present) ===
In 2007, Smiley relocated to Orlando to work as a trainer for WWE's then development territory, Florida Championship Wrestling. He also wrestled his last WWE match on November 19, 2007 against Vladimir Kozlov in a dark match at a Heat taping. In early 2010, he started making on-camera appearances as the lieutenant general manager of FCW and later in August of that year he was known on FCW TV as the liaison for the FCW president, Steve Keirn.

Since its inception as a developmental territory, Smiley has continued to work as a trainer for WWE in NXT.

== Championships and accomplishments ==
- Consejo Mundial de Lucha Libre
  - CMLL World Heavyweight Championship (1 time)
  - CMLL World Heavyweight Title Tournament (1992)
- Four Star Championship Wrestling
  - FSCW Heavyweight Championship (1 time)
- Future of Wrestling
  - FOW World Heavyweight Championship (1 time)
- Global Wrestling Alliance
  - GWA Global Television Championship (1 time)
- Independent Pro Wrestling Association
  - IPWA Southern Championship (1 time)
  - IPWA Tag Team Championship (1 time) – with Joe DeFuria
- Maximum Pro Wrestling
  - MXPW Heavyweight Championship (1 time)
  - MXPW Heavyweight Title Tournament (2004)
- Pro Wrestling Illustrated
  - Ranked No. 107 of the 500 best singles wrestler of the PWI 500 in 2000
  - Ranked No. 375 of the 500 best singles wrestlers of the PWI Years in 2003
- World Championship Wrestling
  - WCW Hardcore Championship (2 times)
- Xtreme Wrestling Alliance
  - XWA World Heavyweight Championship (1 time)
