= Ricky Vega =

American professional wrestler

Personal information
- Born: Ephraim Vega; December 2, 1976 (age 49) Bronx, New York

Professional wrestling career
- Ring name(s): Machete; Ricky Vega
- Billed height: 6 ft 1 in (1.85 m)
- Billed weight: 230 lb (100 kg)
- Billed from: Puerto Rico
- Trained by: Johnny Rodz; Marty Jannetty; Ted DiBiase
- Debut: December 2000
- Retired: 2009

Ephraim Vega (born December 2, 1976) is a Puerto Rican American professional wrestler and is best known for his work in Total Nonstop Action Wrestling, under the ring name Machete, and internationally under the name Ricky Vega. Vega was a high school football player, and was named to All-Section, All-conference, and All-county 1st teams in his junior and senior years. A knee injury prevented Vega from playing college football; however, he did go on to have a successful career in the insurance business before deciding to pursue a wrestling career. Vega currently works as a detective with the Kansas City Missouri Police Department.

== Professional wrestling career ==
=== Total Nonstop Action Wrestling ===
In February 2006 at Against All Odds, Vega debuted in Total Nonstop Action Wrestling (TNA) as "Machete", replacing Apollo as a member of The Latin American Xchange (LAX). The LAX lost the match to The James Gang (B.G. James and Kip James) when B.G. pinned Machete. LAX went on to defeat "La Migra" on Impact! and interfere in James Gang matches until the feud came to a head when LAX faced The James Gang in a rematch at Destination X on March 12 but lost after Machete was pinned by Kip.

Machete made his return to TNA on the February 15, 2007 episode of Impact! pushing Konnan, who at that time was using a wheelchair due to hip surgery, to the ring for LAX's tag team match against Shark Boy and Norman Smiley. Machete played a major role in keeping LAX Tag Champions by interfering first at Against All Odds then again at Destination X in matches against Team 3D. Later at an Impact! taping, he assisted Homicide in defeating Scott Steiner and Brother Devon in a three-way tag match. Vega would also keep Voodoo Kin Mafia (formerly The James Gang) from winning the belts on Impact! by again interjecting himself in the match. Vega was also involved in the Belting Pot match between Team 3D and LAX, which would turn into a gang scuffle between LAX Latino Nation members and Brother Ray's Italian Brotherhood. He would work as LAX's enforcer for a brief time before deciding to take an offer from the IWA in Puerto Rico.

=== Independent career ===
Ricky Vega began his independent wrestling career working for teacher Johnny Rodz and his World of Unpredictable Wrestling (WUW) company in Brooklyn, New York. Vega would capture his first title while wrestling for WUW and won its annual Rumble in Dumbo-battle royal. The object is to throw all of your opponents over the top rope and be the last man standing consisting of 20 to 50 wrestlers in the ring at a time. His North American title reign was short lived however after Rodz found that Vega had begun working in the Pennsylvania independent circuit without his approval. The pair would work things out and Vega began working for Pro-Pain Pro Wrestling under owners Jasmin St. Claire and The Blue Meanie.

Vega also began working shows for Afa's World Xtreme Wrestling (WXW) around the time he began his stint in 3PW. Vega wrestled against such notables as Samu, D-Ray 3000 and Matt Striker. Vega was also exposed to his first taste of television exposure in the Northeast.

=== Dynamite Championship Wrestling ===
Vega made his way to Dynamite Championship Wrestling in August 2006. He debuted by defeating Viper. With the win he earned an immediate Heavyweight title match due to Hector Guerrero vacating the championship. He would go on to defeat Matt Bentley and become champion. Vega was later stripped of the championship and the title held vacant setting the stage for a title tournament. Vega would defeat Bobby Barretta and JB Cool to move into the finals against Glacier. Vega and Glacier had developed a friendship in DCW saving each other on past events. The match seemed to be competitive and fair until Don Kiko Cabana came down to ring side and assisted Vega in regaining the title. Vega would go on to feud with Glacier for the better part of that year, until it all came to a head when they faced off in a Lumberjack match. Vega would again defeat Glacier thanks to Benny Blanco and Simon Sez, the latter who which became commissioner. Vega would go on to successfully defend his title against D-Von Dudley of the Dudley Boyz with the help of Bill DeMott, which set up grudge match with the Dudley Boyz facing off against Vega and Demott. The match would prove to be Demott's retirement match, and Team 3D prevailed by putting Vega through a table.

=== Coastal Championship Wrestling ===
Vega worked on again off again for the Coastal Championship Wrestling (CCW) company in Miami from 2005 through 2007. Some of his highlights included a pair of victories over Shane Mclain and wins over Preston James, Bruno Sassi, and a West Miami battle royale. Other highlights include match of the year candidate for a triple threat match featuring Kahagas and Jerry Lynn as well as a CCW championship loss to Shawn Murphy. Vega traveled and worked with CCW in Coral Springs, Ocoee, West Miami and Cocoa Beach.

=== National Wrestling Alliance ===
Ricky Vega began his stint with the National Wrestling Alliance in Las Vegas, Nevada at the Orleans Hotel and Casino in fantastic fashion. He defeated Cassidy O'Brien in record-breaking fashion. His thirty-second destruction of O'Brien stands as the quickest victory in the company's storied history. Later Vega earned the honor of wrestling at the Philips Arena in a tribute show to Ric Flair for his induction into the NWA Hall of Fame. During this time Vega also began teaming with Glamour Boy Shane in their run for the IWA tag titles, eventual split and rivalry with one another in Puerto Rico.

=== Federation X Entertainment ===
Federation X Entertainment, also known as FXE, began running shows in Orlando, Florida after a very successful run as a wrestling school once headed by Devon Dudley, Matt Bentley and AJ Galant. Ricky Vega trained many of Florida's independent stars of today and helped mold them with the launch of FXE's Crush Live shows.

=== International Wrestling Association ===
On August 17, 2007, Vega signed with International Wrestling Association (IWA) in Puerto Rico. Vega won his debut match and went on to defeat Ricky Cruzz and El Bacano. During an IWA and National Wrestling Alliance (NWA) inter-promotional show, Rob Conway interfered in a match between Glamour Boy Shane and Billy Kidman, prompting Vega to come out to save Shane. This marked the formation of The RS Express tag team, which consisted of Shane and Vega. The RS Express debuted against the IWA World Tag Team Champions The Naturals Chase Stevens and Andy Douglas but lost the match by disqualification after The Star Revolution Corporation and Los Aerios, two other teams contending for the tag team titles, interfered. The RS Express received a rematch on Total Impact, the IWA's television show, which ended in another disqualification after Douglas hit Vega with the championship belt. In another rematch, Douglas hit Shane with the championship belt, but the referee was distracted by Orlando Toledo, the manager of The Naturals, and so was not disqualified. This resulted in The RS Express challenging The Naturals to a hardcore street fight for the tag team championship belts; however, The Naturals prevailed again due to outside interference from Tim Arson. As a result, a four corners tag team elimination match was booked between The Naturals, The RS Express, Blitz and Chicano, and Tim Arson and Big Vito, with the winner going to Las Vegas to challenge the NWA World Tag Team Champions. The RS Express were eliminated when Arson hit Vega with a fire extinguisher, allowing Douglas to get the pin on Vega. This incident set the stage for a feud between Vega and Arson. Their first match ended in victory for Arson; however, Vega won a rematch setting up a third and final encounter. Vega ended the feud by defeating Arson.

In the middle of a feud between Germán Figueroa and Savio Vega, tensions between Savio and his cousin Ricky Vega began to rise due to Savio's erratic behavior. During a no disqualification match between Savio and Apolo, Vega attempted to stop Savio from further assaulting Apolo, as did the IWA World Heavyweight Champion, Blitz. Savio refused to listen to them and when Blitz turned to seek further assistance from Ricky, he was attacked by the latter thus forming an alliance between the Vega cousins. Both Savio and Ricky took turns assaulting Apolo and Blitz while the rest of their newly formed faction came down to ringside. Ricky's tag team partner Shane attempted to stop the beating but was attacked by the faction, referred to as "Los Autenticos." Ricky later blamed Shane for costing him the opportunity to win the tag team titles and the former teammates began a historic feud.

In their first match, Ricky defeated Shane in front of a packed crowd at Histeria Boricua. In the rematch, which was billed as a Puerto Rican Street fight, Vega again came out victorious, and earned a shot at the Undisputed World Heavyweight Championship; however, the match was not a singles match, but a five-way dance, also featuring Blitz the defending champion, Shane, Mr. Big from the World Wrestling Council and Bison Smith, who was representing Japan. The five-way dance occurred after a title unification match between Blitz (IWA World Heavyweight Champion) and Big (World Wrestling Council World Champion). Blitz defeated Big becoming the first ever Undisputed World Champion in the history of Puerto Rico. The unified title was renamed the IWA Undisputed World Heavyweight Championship.

Prior to the match, Ricky Vega began referring to himself as The Alpha Omega, claiming that the wrestling business began with and ended with him. Ricky won the match, and the Undisputed World Championship by pinning Blitz. He went on to successfully defend the title against Shane Sewell, Germán Figueroa, Ray González, Miguel Perez and Freddie "Blitz" Lozada among others.

In April 2008, an ownership dispute between Mario Savoldi and Savio Vega halted promotional events and the company stopped running shows. Savio was eventually awarded the company and its assets after court proceedings. IWA returned to television in May 2008, and a tournament was held for a new IWA Champion. The final match was between Blitz and Chicano; however, Ricky Vega returned to the IWA with the title in tow. It was reported Ricky had been on the side of Savoldi in his dispute with Savio, which was why the tournament had been set up. Despite this, Ricky was entered into the tournament final, making the match a three-way dance. Ricky was knocked out of the match by special guest referee Savio Vega, but later returned wearing a referee shirt of his own after Savio was knocked out by Blitz. Ricky counted out Chicano, making Blitz the new champion.

Ricky then aligned himself with Blitz and La Rabia and challenged Savio for his RXW World Heavyweight Championship. Ricky defeated Savio in a non-title match but lost the championship rematch after Savio hired a referee to ensure his win. After the match, Ricky was given an emotional send off by fans perhaps sensing the end was near for high level wrestling in Puerto Rico with fewer opportunities for the company to import top notch American talent. During his time with the IWA, Ricky was recognized as the Undisputed Champion of Puerto Rico, wrestler of the year and was elected as the best wrestler in Latin America during his reign.

== Championships and accomplishments ==
- Dynamite Championship Wrestling
  - DCW Heavyweight Championship (2 times)
- International Wrestling Association
  - IWA World Heavyweight Championship (2 times)
- Pro Wrestling Illustrated
  - PWI ranked Vega as one of the world's best singles wrestlers of the PWI 500 from 2005 through 2009.
- World of Unpredictable Wrestling
  - WUW North American Heavyweight Championship (2 times)

== See also ==
- Professional wrestling in Puerto Rico
