= Destination X (2006) =

2006 Total Nonstop Action Wrestling pay-per-view event

- DVD cover featuring A.J. Styles, Christopher Daniels, and Samoa Joe
- Promotion: Total Nonstop Action Wrestling
- Date: March 12, 2006
- City: Orlando, Florida
- Venue: Impact Zone
- Attendance: 900
- Tagline: Beyond the Ring

Pay-per-view chronology
← Previous; Against All Odds	Next → Lockdown

Destination X chronology
← Previous; 2005	Next → 2007

The 2006 Destination X was a professional wrestling pay-per-view (PPV) event produced by Total Nonstop Action Wrestling (TNA), which took place on March 12, 2006 from the Impact Zone in Orlando, Florida. It was the second event under the Destination X chronology. Eight matches were featured on the event's card.

In October 2017, with the launch of the Global Wrestling Network, the event became available to stream on demand.

== Storylines ==
The event featured wrestlers from pre-existing scripted feuds and storylines. Wrestlers portrayed villains, heroes, or less distinguishable characters in the scripted events that built tension and culminated in a wrestling match or series of matches.

== Event ==
Prior to the start of the broadcast there was a dark match which saw Shannon Moore defeat Cassidy Riley. This was followed by one preshow match which entailed The Diamonds in the Rough (David Young and Elix Skipper) defeating Shark Boy and Norman Smiley.

The opening match of the pay-per-view saw Jay Lethal take on Alex Shelley. Toward the end of the match, Lethal hit the diving head butt off the top for a near fall, but Shelley kicked out. Lethal then went for a suplex, however Shelley blocked it hitting Sliced Bread #2 for the victory.

The second match saw Lance Hoyt defeat Matt Bentley.

Next the next match was between The Naturals (Chase Stevens and Andy Douglas) and Team Canada (Bobby Roode and Eric Young). Ultimately Team Canada picked up the victory after using a hockey stick as a weapon.

A six-man tag team match was next which saw The James Gang (B.G. James and Kip James) and Bob Armstrong take on The Latin American Xchange (Homicide, Hernandez and Machete). Although Homicide spent most of the match in the ring, the match ended when Machete was left alone in the ring. Kip hits Machete with a cobra slutch slam to pick up the victory.

The next match was a International X Division four way match between Petey Williams (representing Canadá), Chris Sabin (representing USA), Sonjay Dutt (representing Índia) and Puma (representing Japan). The match ended with a series of finishing moves hit on each other. First Williams has the sharpshooter on Puma before Dutt breaks it up. Then Dutt hits a piledriver on Williams, followed by trying to hit Williams with the Canadian Destroyer, however Williams reverses it and hits it on him. Sabin then tried a Cradle Shock, Petey tried a Destroyer and ultimately Puma hit a blockbuster on Sabin. Sabin kicks out and hits the Cradle Shock on Puma to pick up the win.

The next match was a 4 on 4 match called an 8-Man War match. This match saw Team 3D (Brother Ray and Brother Devon), Rhino and Ron Killings take on America's Most Wanted (Chris Harris and James Storm), Jeff Jarrett and Abyss. Toward the end of the match, Killings attempted to get his team an advantage by taking Harris' handcuffs and locking him up outside the ring. Harris however was able to grab Killings' foot which gave Jarrett the opening he needed to hit The Stroke and pick up the victory.

The second to last match was an Ultimate X match for the TNA X Division Championship. This match saw Samoa Joe defend his title against Christopher Daniels and A.J. Styles. After Styles went for the X, Joe attacked him with a chair. Daniels then kicked the chair back into Joe's face enabling him to climb up and grab the X and win the championship.

The main event was for the NWA World Heavyweight Championship. This match saw Christian Cage fend his title against Monty Brown. At the end of the match, Brown attempted to hit the Alpha Bomb however Cage reversed it and hit the Unprettier to retain the championship. Following the match, Sting returned and whipped Jeff Jarrett with a belt before Scott Steiner made his debut in TNA.

== Results ==
No.	Results	Stipulations	Times
1^{D}	Shannon Moore defeated Cassidy Riley	Singles match	03:21
2^{P}	The Diamonds in the Rough (David Young and Elix Skipper) (with Simon Diamond) defeated Shark Boy and Norman Smiley	Tag team match	03:17
3	Alex Shelley defeated Jay Lethal	Singles match	09:58
4	Lance Hoyt defeated Matt Bentley (with Traci Brooks)	Singles match	08:01
5	Team Canada (Bobby Roode and Eric Young) (with Coach D'Amore and A-1) defeated The Naturals (Chase Stevens and Andy Douglas)	Tag team match	13:05
6	The James Gang (B.G. James and Kip James) and Bob Armstrong defeated Latin American Xchange (Homicide, Machete and Konnan)	Six-man tag team match	06:40
7	Chris Sabin defeated Petey Williams, Sonjay Dutt and Puma	International X Division Four-way match	14:55
8	Abyss, Jeff Jarrett and America's Most Wanted (Chris Harris and James Storm) (with Gail Kim, James Mitchell and Jackie Gayda) defeated Rhino, Ron Killings and Team 3D (Brother Ray and Brother Devon)	8-Man War	20:12
9	Christopher Daniels defeated Samoa Joe (c) and A.J. Styles	Ultimate X match for the TNA X Division Championship	13:30
10	Christian Cage (c) defeated Monty Brown	Singles match for the NWA World Heavyweight Championship	17:07
(c) / – the champion(s) heading into the match; D / – this was a dark match; P / – the match was broadcast on the pre-show
