= Billy Gunn =

American professional wrestler (born 1963)

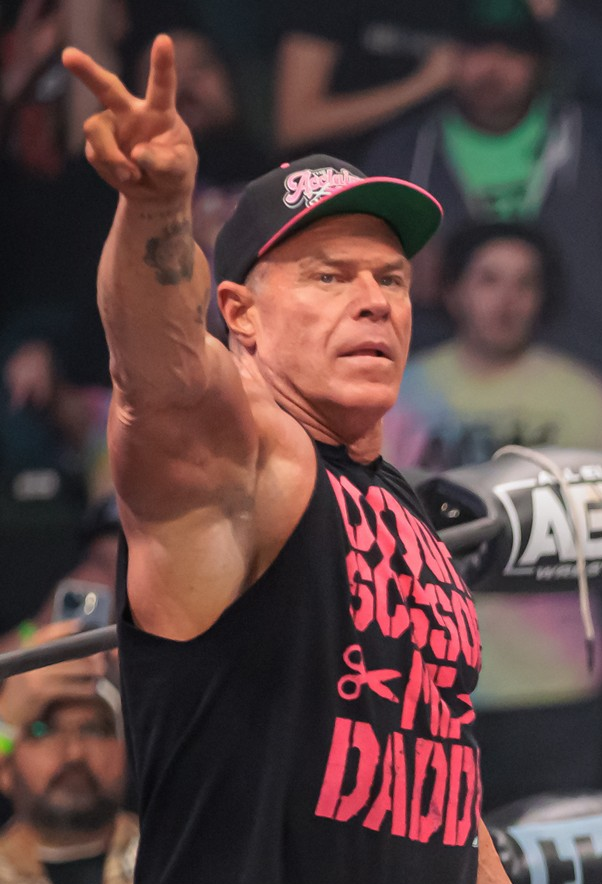
- Gunn in 2022

Personal information
- Born: Monty Kip Sopp; November 1, 1963 (age 63) Orlando, Florida, U.S.
- Education: Sam Houston State University
- Spouses: Tina Tinnell (m. 1990; div. 2002); Paula Sopp (m. 2009)
- Children: Colten Gunn; Austin Gunn

Professional wrestling career
- Ring name(s): Billy; Billy G Billy Gunn; Cute Kip; Daddy Ass; KIP; Kip Gunn; Kip James; Kip Montana; Kip Sopp; Kip Winchester; Mr. Ass; The G-Man; The New Age Outlaw; The Outlaw; Rockabilly
- Billed height: 6 ft 3 in (191 cm)
- Billed weight: 260 lb (118 kg)
- Billed from: Austin, Texas; Orlando, Florida
- Trained by: Jerry Gray; Don Harris; Ron Harris
- Debut: 1989

Monty Kip Sopp (born November 1, 1963), better known by his ring name Billy Gunn, is an American professional wrestler. He is signed to All Elite Wrestling (AEW), where he also performs under the ring name Daddy Ass and is a coach as well as an occasional in-ring talent. He was a former member of The Acclaimed as a manager and the team's six-man tag team partner. He is also signed to WWE under a Legends contract. He also works for Maple Leaf Pro Wrestling (MLP) as a producer.

He was previously known for his tenures in World Wrestling Federation/Entertainment (WWF/E) from 1993 to 2004 and from 2012 to 2015, while also serving as a coach on WWE's Tough Enough and was a trainer in NXT. He also wrestled for Total Nonstop Action Wrestling from 2005 to 2009.

Primarily a tag team wrestler, Gunn is an overall 11-time tag team champion in WWE with three different partners (with Bart Gunn as The Smoking Gunns; with Road Dogg as The New Age Outlaws; and with Chuck Palumbo as Billy and Chuck). He is also a former one-time WWF Intercontinental Champion and a two-time WWF Hardcore Champion, giving him 14 total championships in WWE. He also won the 1999 King of the Ring tournament, and was inducted into the WWE Hall of Fame in 2019 as a member of D-Generation X. At AEW, Gunn is a former one-time and longest reigning AEW World Trios Champions with The Acclaimed (Max Caster and Anthony Bowens).

== Professional wrestling career ==
=== Early career (1989–1993) ===
Gunn trained as a bull rider while attending Oviedo High School in Oviedo, Florida. After a stint as a professional bull rider in Professional Rodeo Cowboys Association, Sopp left the profession in his early 20s in order to pursue a career as a professional wrestler. Trained by Jerry Gray, Sopp wrestled on the independent circuit for eight years (including a brief stint as enhancement talent for World Championship Wrestling (WCW) before signing a contract with the World Wrestling Federation (WWF) in 1993.

=== World Wrestling Federation/Entertainment (1993–2004) ===
==== The Smoking Gunns (1993–1996) ====
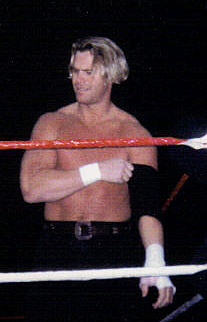
Gunn in 1996

After weeks of vignettes, Sopp, under the name Billy Gunn, made his WWF debut on the May 17, 1993, episode of Raw, teaming with his on-screen brother, Bart Gunn to defeat Tony Vadja and Glenn Ruth. The duo, now known as The Smoking Gunns, made their pay-per-view debut at King of the Ring, teaming with The Steiner Brothers to defeat Money Inc. and The Headshrinkers in an eight-man tag team match. At SummerSlam, the duo teamed with Tatanka to pick up a win against Bam Bam Bigelow and the Headshrinkers. On January 22, 1994, Gunn entered his first Royal Rumble match at the namesake event, but was eliminated by Diesel. In early 1995, the Gunns won their first Tag Team Championship by defeating the makeshift team of Bob Holly and 1-2-3 Kid. They held the title until WrestleMania XI, where they were defeated by the team of Owen Hart and Yokozuna. They won the titles again in September 1995.

On February 15, 1996, the Gunns vacated the title because Billy was in need of neck surgery. After Billy returned from hiatus, The Smoking Gunns won the Tag Team Title for the third time by defeating The Godwinns in May in the Free-For-All of In Your House 8: Beware of Dog after Billy distracted Phineas by kissing Sunny. After the match, The Godwinns' manager Sunny turned on her team in favor of the Gunns, turning all three heel in the process. On September 22 at In Your House: Mind Games, the Gunns lost the Tag Team Title to Owen Hart and The British Bulldog. After the match, Sunny abandoned The Gunns, saying that she would only manage title holders. Billy, frustrated with losing both the championship and Sunny, walked out on Bart, breaking up The Smoking Gunns. The two would feud in late 1996.

==== Rockabilly, The New Age Outlaws and D-Generation X (1997–1998) ====
After The Smoking Gunns disbanded, Gunn took some time off to nurse an injury. At WrestleMania 13, he defeated Flash Funk catching the attention of The Honky Tonk Man, who made Gunn his protégé. During this time, he adopted a new gimmick, Rockabilly, He would use this gimmick throughout much of 1997 and eventually had a short-lived feud with "The Real Double J" Jesse James. On the October 4, 1997, episode of Shotgun Saturday Night, James realized both of their careers were going nowhere and suggested that they become a tag team. Gunn agreed and smashed a guitar over the Honky Tonk Man's head to solidify their new alliance.

James and Rockabilly were quickly rebranded as "Road Dogg" Jesse James and "Badd Ass" Billy Gunn, respectively, and their tag team was dubbed the New Age Outlaws. They quickly rose to the top of the tag team ranks and won the Tag Team Championship from the Legion of Doom on November 24. They also defeated the LOD in a rematch at In Your House: D-Generation X.

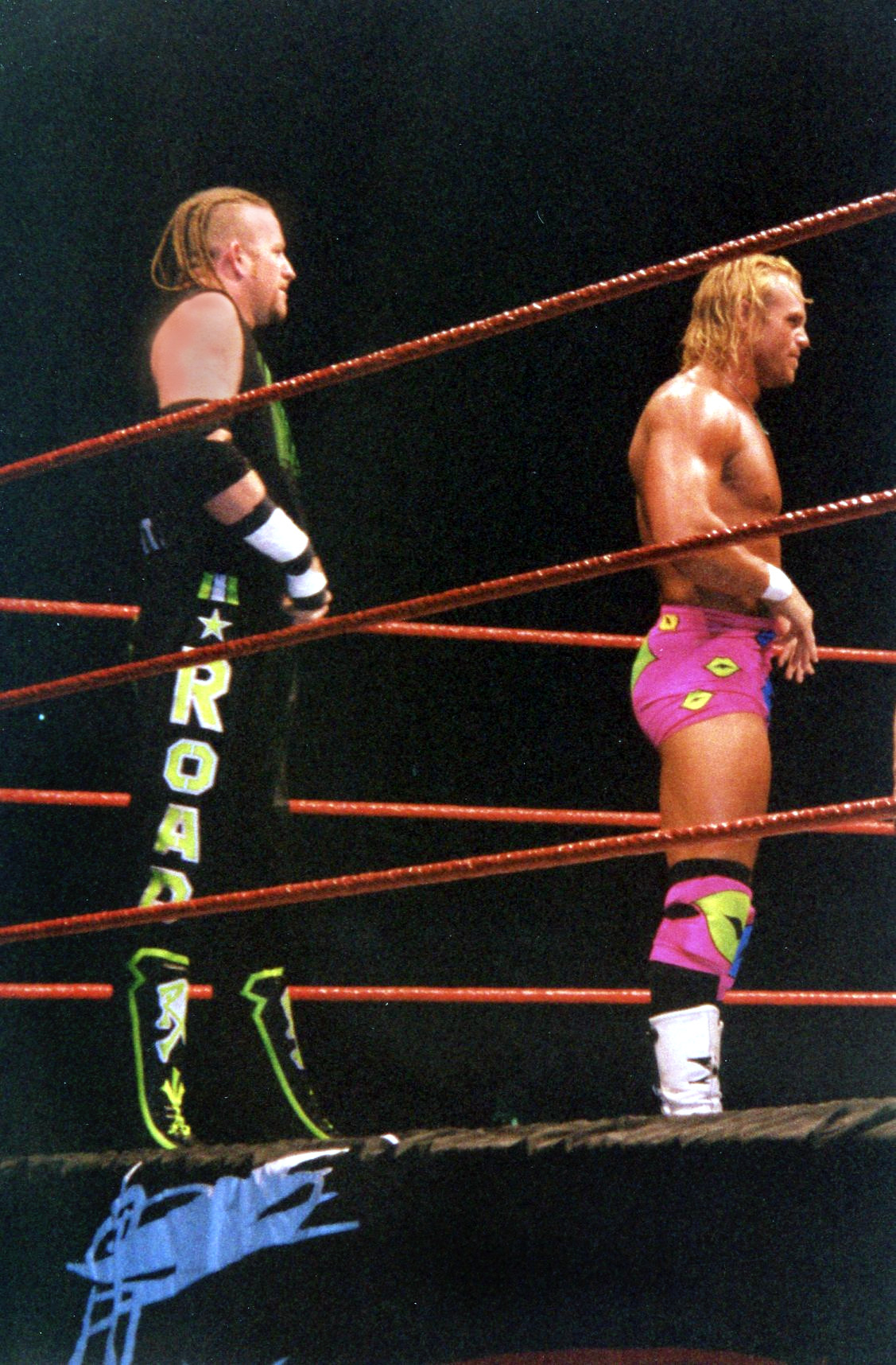
"Road Dogg" Jesse James and "Badd Ass" Billy Gunn (right) in 1999

The Outlaws slowly began to align themselves with D-Generation X. At the Royal Rumble, the New Age Outlaws interfered in a casket match to help Shawn Michaels defeat The Undertaker. At No Way Out Of Texas, the Outlaws teamed up with Triple H and Savio Vega (who replaced the injured Shawn Michaels) to face Chainsaw Charlie, Cactus Jack, Owen Hart, and Steve Austin. They were, however, defeated. On February 2, The Outlaws locked Cactus and Chainsaw in a dumpster and pushed it off the stage. This led to a dumpster match at WrestleMania XIV where Cactus and Chainsaw defeated the Outlaws for the Tag Titles. The next night on Raw, the New Age Outlaws won the Tag Team Championship for a second time by defeating Chainsaw and Cactus in a steel cage match, but only after interference from Triple H, Chyna, and X-Pac. After the match, the Outlaws officially became members of D-Generation X (DX).

After joining DX, the Outlaws successfully defended their Tag Team Title against the Legion of Doom 2000 at Unforgiven. DX began to feud with Owen Hart and his new stablemates, The Nation. At Over The Edge, the Outlaws and Triple H were defeated by Nation members Owen, Kama Mustafa, and D'Lo Brown in a Six Man Tag Match.

During this time, the Outlaws began a feud with Kane and Mankind. At SummerSlam, Mankind faced the Outlaws in a Handicap match after Kane no-showed the title defense. The Outlaws defeated Mankind to win the titles for the third time. In December, the Outlaws lost the title to The Big Boss Man and Ken Shamrock from The Corporation.

==== Mr. Ass and reformation of the Outlaws and DX (1999–2000) ====
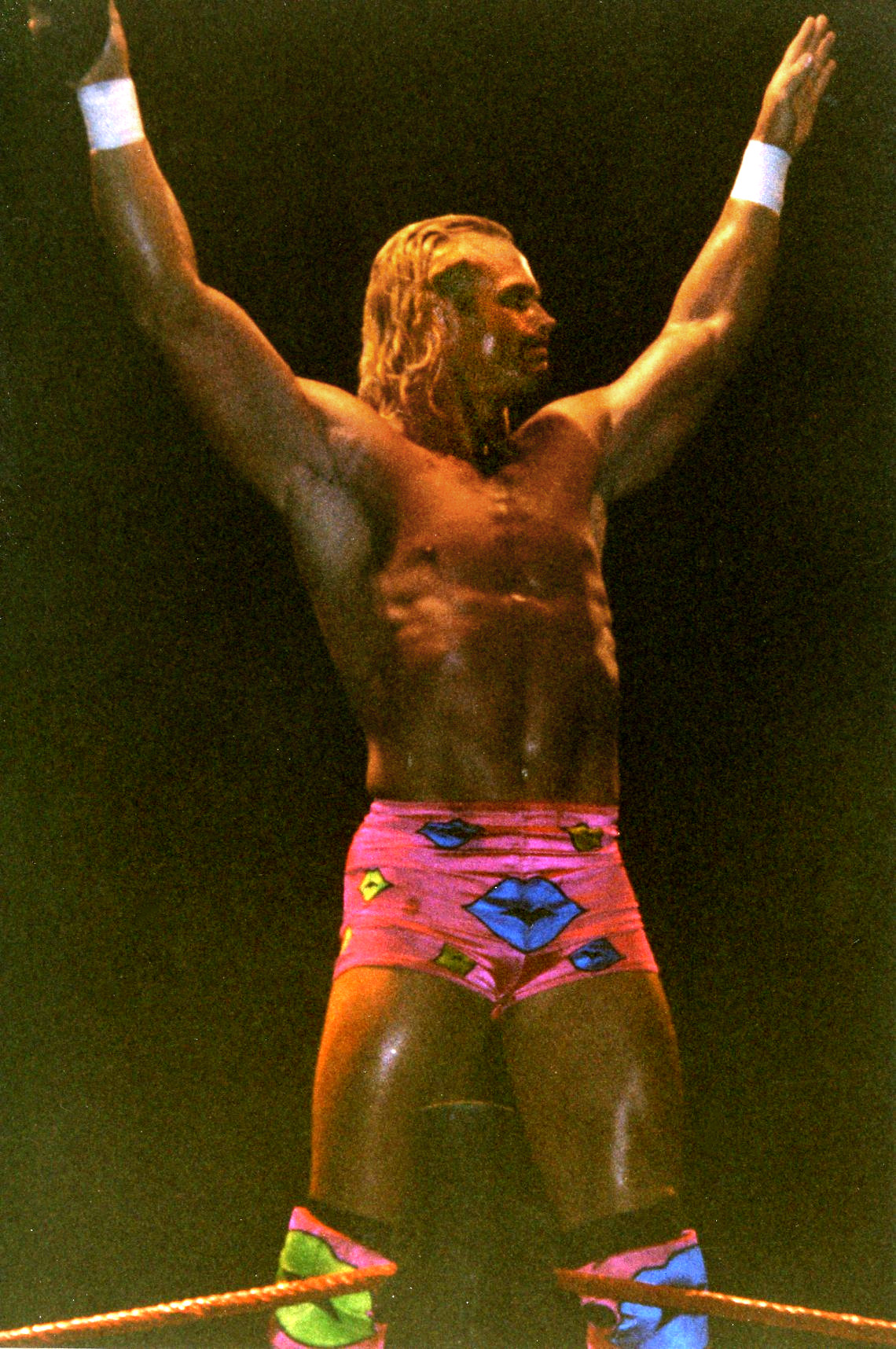
Gunn posing in 1999

The Outlaws then began to focus more on singles competition. Road Dogg won the Hardcore Championship in December 1998, and Gunn set his sights on the Intercontinental Championship. At the 1999 Royal Rumble, Gunn unsuccessfully challenged Ken Shamrock for the Intercontinental Title. The next month at St. Valentine's Day Massacre, Gunn was the special guest referee for the Intercontinental Championship match between Val Venis and champion Ken Shamrock, where Gunn made a fast count and declared Venis the new champion before attacking both men.

In March, Gunn won the Hardcore Championship from Hardcore Holly. At WrestleMania XV, Gunn lost the title to Holly in a Triple Threat match which also included Al Snow. The New Age Outlaws then reunited to defeat Jeff Jarrett and Owen Hart at Backlash. After Backlash, Gunn left D-Generation X and aligned himself with Triple H and Chyna. Gunn defeated his former partner, Road Dogg, in a match at Over the Edge. Gunn then won the King of the Ring tournament by defeating Ken Shamrock, Kane, and his former ally, X-Pac. After King of the Ring, Gunn, Triple H, and Chyna went on to feud with X-Pac and Road Dogg over the rights to the D-Generation X name. This feud culminated at Fully Loaded when X-Pac and Road Dogg defeated Gunn and Chyna.

Gunn then began a brief feud with The Rock. At SummerSlam, The Rock defeated Gunn in a Kiss My Ass Match. Following this, Gunn then briefly feuded with Jeff Jarrett for the Intercontinental Title before reuniting with Road Dogg to reform The New Age Outlaws. The Outlaws won their fourth tag team championship by defeating The Rock 'n' Sock Connection in September 1999. The Outlaws later reunited with X-Pac and Triple H to reform D-Generation X. During this time, The Outlaws won their fifth Tag Team Championship after defeating Mankind and Al Snow. At the 2000 Royal Rumble, The New Age Outlaws retained their title against The Acolytes after interference from X-Pac. The Outlaws then had a feud with The Dudley Boyz, who won the Tag Team Championship from The Outlaws at No Way Out. After suffering a torn rotator cuff in the match with The Dudley Boyz, Gunn was kicked out of D-Generation X for "losing his cool" to explain his impending absence to recover from his injury.

==== The One (2000–2001) ====
Gunn made his return in October and immediately teamed with Chyna to feud with Right to Censor, who wanted to "censor" his Mr. Ass gimmick. At No Mercy, Right to Censor members Steven Richards and Val Venis defeated Chyna and Gunn. Due to a stipulation in a match with Steven Richards on the October 31 episode of Monday Night Raw from the Fleet Center in Boston, Massachusetts, Gunn could no longer use the Mr. Ass gimmick, so he renamed himself Billy G. for a few weeks before settling on "The One" Billy Gunn. Gunn then feuded with Eddie Guerrero and the rest of The Radicalz. At Survivor Series, Gunn teamed with Road Dogg, Chyna, and K-Kwik in a losing effort against The Radicalz. A few weeks later on SmackDown!, Gunn won the Intercontinental Championship from Guerrero. However, the title reign was short-lived, as Chris Benoit defeated him for the title two weeks later at Armageddon. After feuding with Benoit, Gunn participated in the 2001 Royal Rumble where he made it to the final four. Gunn interfered in the Hardcore Championship Match at No Way Out, and taking advantage of the 24/7 Rule, pinning Raven for the title. The reign was short-lived, as Raven won it back a few minutes later.

==== Billy and Chuck (2001–2002) ====
In a 2001 match on Sunday Night Heat, Gunn was defeated by Chuck Palumbo, who recently left The Alliance to join the WWF. After the match, Gunn suggested that they form a tag team. Palumbo agreed, and Billy and Chuck quickly rose to the top of the tag team division. Initially they were a generic tandem, but they were given a gimmick where they grew increasingly affectionate toward each other, showing evidence of a storyline homosexual relationship.

On the February 21, 2002 episode of SmackDown!, Billy and Chuck defeated Spike Dudley and Tazz to win the WWF Tag Team Championship for the first time as a team. After winning the titles, Billy and Chuck found a "Personal Stylist" in the ambiguously flamboyant Rico. After retaining the title against the Acolytes Protection Agency, the Dudley Boyz, and the Hardy Boyz in a Four Corners Elimination Match at WrestleMania X8 on March 17 and against Al Snow and Maven at Backlash on April 21, Billy and Chuck began a feud with Rikishi. At Judgment Day on May 19, Rikishi and Rico (Rikishi's mystery partner of Mr. McMahon's choosing) defeated Billy and Chuck for the WWE Tag Team Championship after Rico accidentally hit Chuck with a roundhouse kick. Billy and Chuck quickly won the title back two weeks later on the June 6 episode of SmackDown! with Rico's help. They held the championship for almost a month before losing it to the team of Edge and Hollywood Hulk Hogan on the July 4 episode of SmackDown!.

On the September 5 edition of SmackDown!, after Billy lost a match to Rey Mysterio, Chuck proposed to Billy, asking him to be his "partner for life" and gave him a wedding ring. Billy agreed, and one week later, on the September 12 episode of SmackDown!, Billy and Chuck had their wedding ceremony. However, just before they tied the knot, they revealed that the entire ordeal was a publicity stunt and disavowed their on-screen homosexuality, admitting that they were just friends. The "preacher" revealed himself to be Raw General Manager Eric Bischoff (who was wearing a skin mask), who then summoned 3-Minute Warning to beat up Billy and Chuck. Rico, furious that Billy and Chuck gave up their gimmick, became the manager of Three Minute Warning and defected to Raw. At Unforgiven on September 22, Three Minute Warning defeated Billy and Chuck. Their final match together occurred on the October 3 episode of SmackDown! in the first round of a tournament for the newly created WWE Tag Team Championship. They lost the match to the team of Ron Simmons and Reverend D-Von. Afterwards, Gunn took a few months off because of a shoulder injury and the team of Billy and Chuck quietly disbanded.

==== SmackDown! and return to singles competition (2003–2004) ====
After returning in June 2003, Gunn reverted to the "Mr. Ass" gimmick, defeating A-Train, and Torrie Wilson became his new manager. He started a feud with Jamie Noble, which led to an "Indecent Proposal" Match at Vengeance on July 27, which Noble won and due to the match's stipulation, won a night with Torrie. After taking time off again due to a shoulder injury, Gunn returned to action at the Royal Rumble on January 25, 2004, but was eliminated by Goldberg. Afterward, he wrestled mainly on Velocity, forming an occasional tag team with Hardcore Holly. At Judgment Day on May 16, Gunn and Holly challenged Charlie Haas and Rico for the WWE Tag Team Championship, but were unsuccessful. At The Great American Bash on June 27, Gunn lost to Kenzo Suzuki. Afterwards, he mainly wrestled on Velocity and house shows until that August.

On November 1, Sopp was released from his WWE contract. In June 2005, Sopp gave an interview in which he was heavily critical of WWE and the events that led to his release. Many of the negative comments were directed towards Triple H, who Sopp claimed "runs the show up there".

=== Total Nonstop Action Wrestling (2005–2009) ===
==== Planet Jarrett (2005) ====
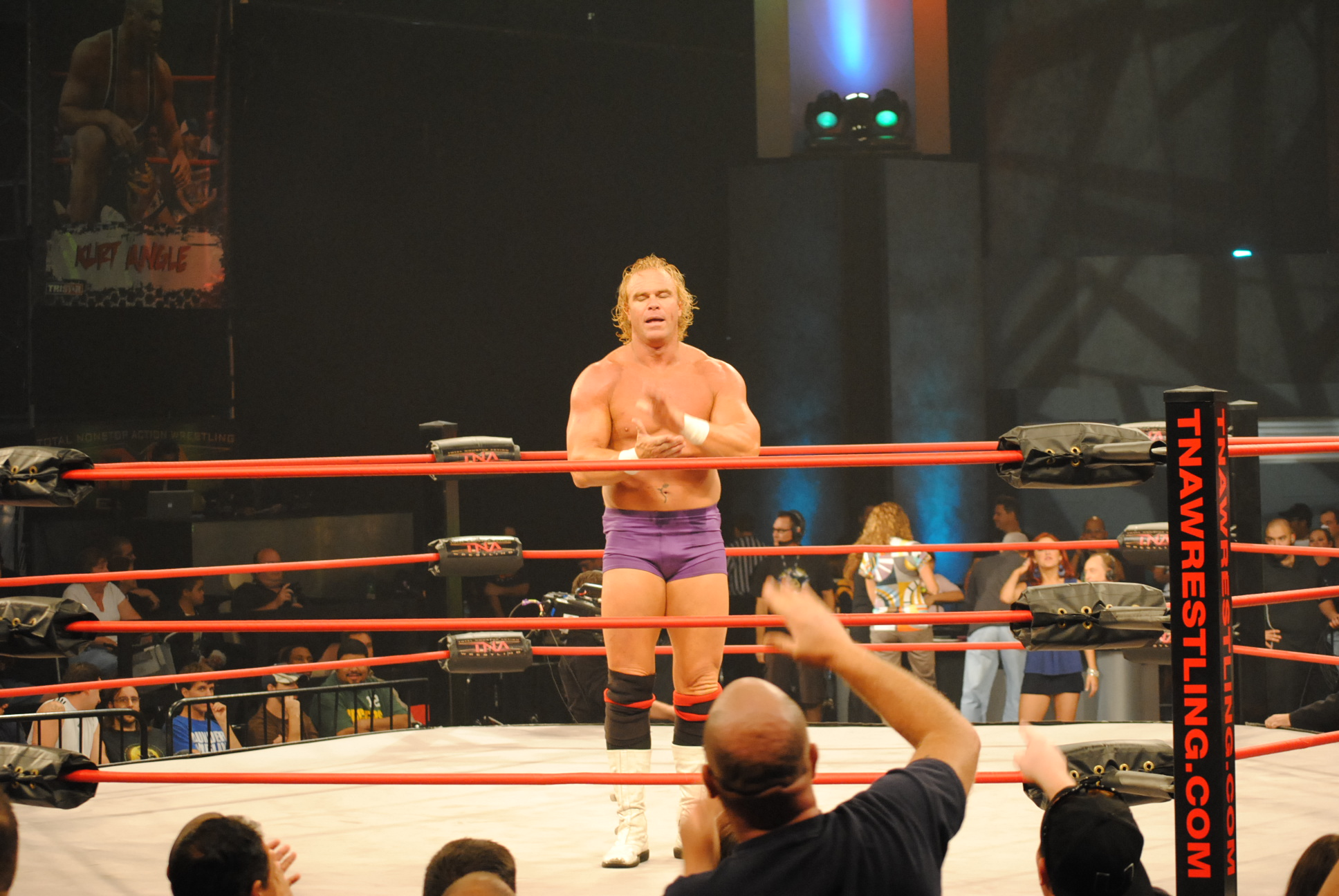
Sopp at a TNA event in 2008

On February 13, 2005, Sopp debuted in Total Nonstop Action Wrestling (TNA) without a name (as Billy Gunn is a WWE trademark, although announcers recognized him as such) at Against All Odds with the same gimmick, helping Jeff Jarrett retain the NWA World Heavyweight Championship in a match with Kevin Nash. Sopp, using the name The New Age Outlaw, then formed a stable with Jarrett and Monty Brown known as Planet Jarrett. However, WWE threatened TNA with legal action if Sopp continued the use of the name "The New Age Outlaw", so he shortened his name to The Outlaw. Due to the legal issues with WWE, all TNA -DVD releases featuring footage with Sopp as "The Outlaw" (and presumably also as "The New Age Outlaw") have had the name on on-screen graphics blurred, the name silenced out of the audio, and match commentary completely replaced to reflect a retroactive name change to "Kip James". One such DVD is the pay-per-view Lockdown, included in the "TNA Anthology: The Epic Set" box set, in which the silencing of the name during a segment where Dusty Rhodes picks his name from a lottery leaves DVD viewers in the dark as to who just got picked.

The Outlaw began a campaign to make former ally B.G. James leave the 3Live Kru and defect to Planet Jarrett, reforming the old tag team with Outlaw. At No Surrender, he renamed himself Kip James and was announced as "wrestling out of Marietta, Georgia" (the family seat of the Armstrong family) as a psychological ploy. As a result of his campaign, Kip attracted the ire of 3Live Kru members Ron Killings and Konnan, leading to a series of tag team matches pitting Kip and Monty Brown against Killings and Konnan, with a conflicted James unwilling to take sides. Kip's efforts ultimately proved futile; James, the guest referee in a final match between Brown and Kip versus Konnan and Killings at Sacrifice, attacked Kip enabling a 3Live Kru victory.

In September at Unbreakable, Kip teamed with Brown to defeat the team of Apolo and Lance Hoyt. There was clear tension between the partners because Brown was unhappy at the series of losses at the hands of the 3Live Kru, and Kip was irked by Brown's decision to leave Planet Jarrett. Despite the victory, the partners argued after the match. On the October 8, 2005, episode of Impact!, Kip rekindled his feud with the 3Live Kru, running to the ring after a bout between the 3LK and Team Canada in order to prevent Team Canada captain Petey Williams from beating down B.G. James. He saved James, and then engaged in a staredown with Konnan and Killings. Kip saved James from Team Canada once again at Bound for Glory. Though Killings showed signs of gratitude, Konnan remained skeptical as to his true intentions. Later that night, Kip took part in an over-the-top-rope gauntlet match for the number one contendership to the NWA World Heavyweight Championship. After he was eliminated, he tried in vain to prevent Killings from being eliminated as well, before being sent away from ringside by the referees.

==== The James Gang/Voodoo Kin Mafia (2005–2008) ====
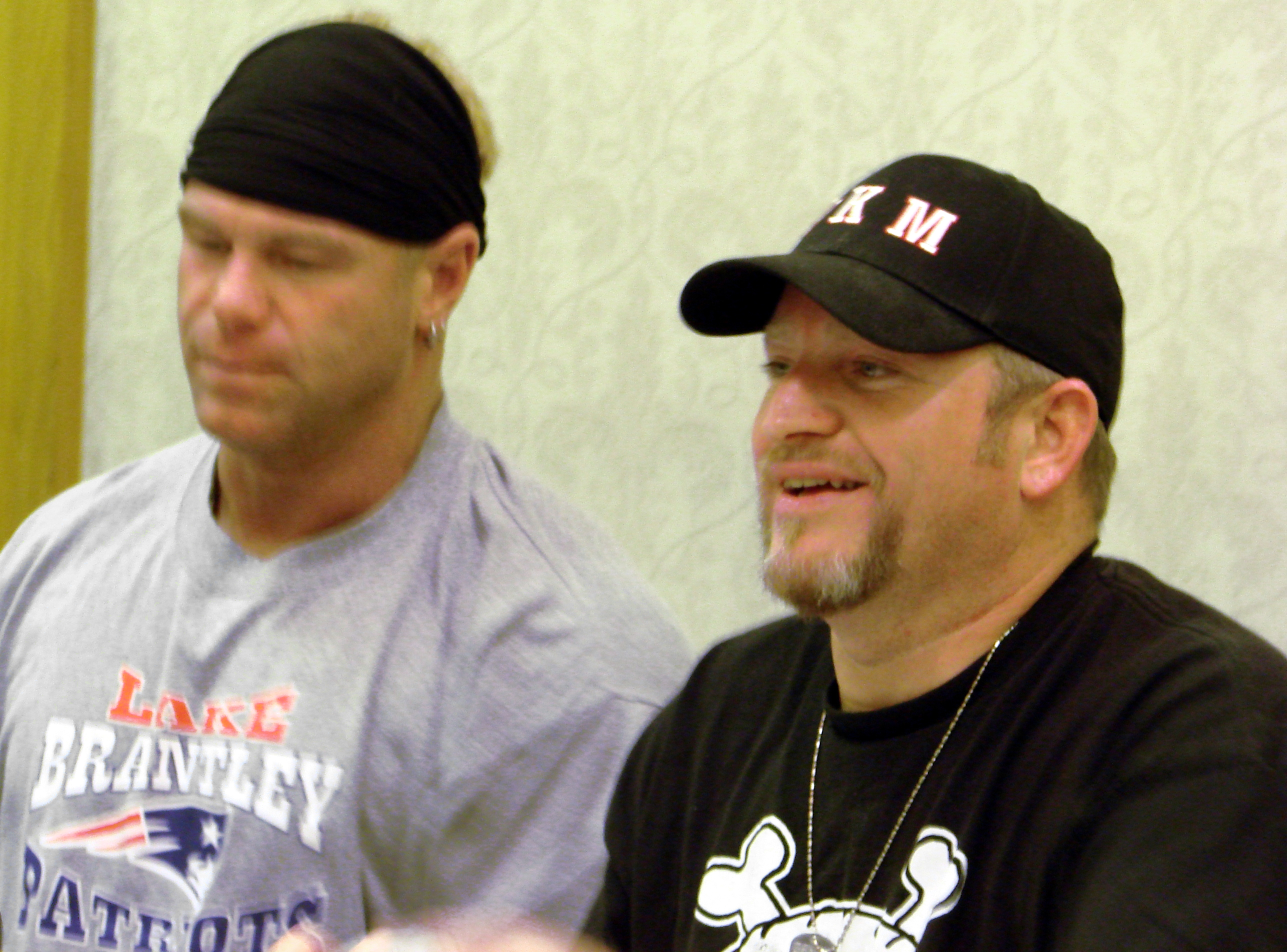
Kip and B.G. James during their time in TNA

On the November 26 episode of Impact!, B.G. brought Kip and the 3Live Kru to ringside and asked Killings and Konnan whether Kip could join the stable. Following a heated argument between Konnan and B.G., both Killings and Konnan gave their approval, and the 4Live Kru was born. However, at Turning Point, Konnan attacked both B.G. and Kip, costing them their match against Team Canada and initiating a feud between himself and the remainder of the Kru. Shortly thereafter, B.G. James's father, Bob Armstrong, attempted to reconcile the group, but was instead attacked by Konnan and his new stablemates, Apolo and Homicide. Killings later stated that he had severed his ties with the Kru. With Konnan and Killings no longer members of the Kru, Kip and B.G. began referring to themselves as The James Gang and continued to feud with the Konnan-managed Latin American Exchange, whose third man position as Homicide's partner would switch from Apolo to Machete, and then from him to Hernandez, who finally stuck, during the course of this feud. At Final Resolution, The James Gang defeated The Diamonds in the Rough (David Young and Elix Skipper). At Against All Odds, The James Gang defeated LAX (Homicide and Machete). At Destination X, The James Gang and Bob Armstrong defeated Latin American Exchange in a six-man tag team match. At Sacrifice, The James Gang defeated Team 3D which led to a rematch at Slammiversary where Team 3D defeated The James Gang in a Bingo Hall Brawl. At Victory Road, The James Gang and Abyss defeated Team 3D and their newest member Brother Runt. At No Surrender, The James Gang competed in a Triple Chance tag team battle royal but failed to win the match. At Bound for Glory, The James Gang competed in a Four-way tag team match which was won by Team 3D.

By November 2006, Kip and B.G. began to show displeasure in TNA and threatened to go find work elsewhere if they did not receive gold soon. They began performing the crotch chop, a reference to the WWE's DX. On the November 2 edition of Impact!, Kip and B.G. threatened to quit. Kip grabbed the mic and tried to say something to the TNA administration and Spike TV, but each time his mic was cut off. Kip then tried to use the announcer's headset, but it was cut off as well. Frustrated, he started yelling loudly to the crowd, but he was cut off again as the show went to a commercial break. When the show returned, the announcers speculated that they may have been frustrated due to the influx of new talent entering TNA. It was reported that the segment was a worked shoot that Vince Russo had written in order to renew interest upon their eventual return. Kip and BG appeared in an internet video on TNA's website where they addressed the owner of WWE Vince McMahon.

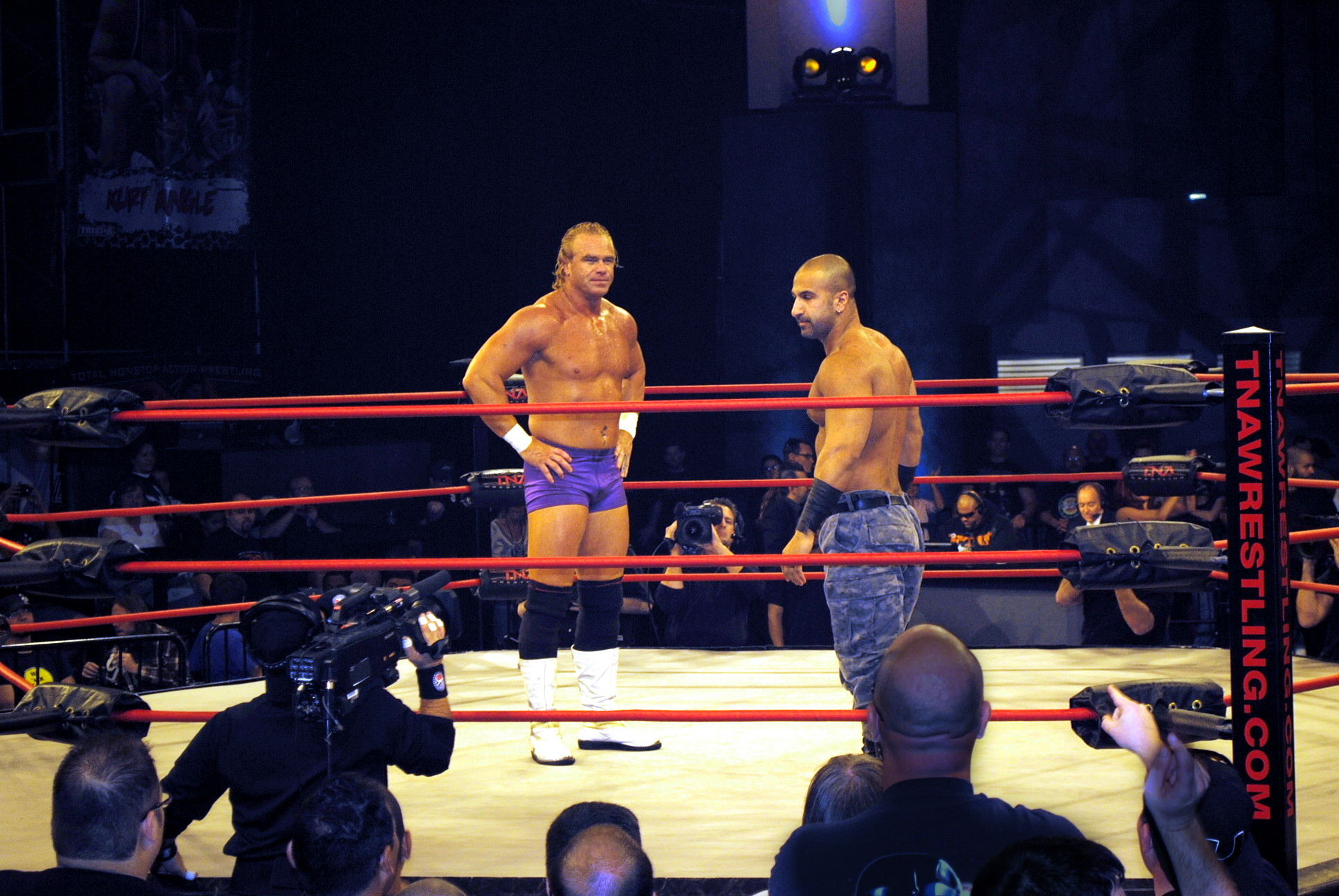
Sopp in a match against Sheik Abdul Bashir

A few weeks later on Impact!, The James Gang re-emerged under a new name Voodoo Kin Mafia (VKM for short, a play on Vincent Kennedy McMahon's initials). They mentioned their new right of 'creative control', meaning they could do whatever they wanted. They also declared 'war' on Paul Levesque, Michael Hickenbottom, and Vincent K. McMahon (Triple H, Shawn Michaels, and Vince McMahon, respectively). Kip then declared that 'Triple Hollywood' and 'Shawn Kiss-my-bottom' were failing as the group they (Kip and BG) used to be a part of: D-Generation X. After the initial shock value of this incident wore off, at Genesis, The Voodoo Kin Mafia defeated Kazarian, Maverick Matt and Johnny Devine in a handicap match. VKM began a feud with the villainous Christy Hemme. Hemme then searched for a tag team to square-off against VKM. At Destination X, The Voodoo Kin Mafia defeated Hemme's handpicked team of The Heartbreakers (Antonio Thomas and Romeo Roselli). On the Lockdown preshow The Voodoo Kin Mafia defeated another one of Hemme's handpicked team Serotonin (Kaz & Havok) in a Six Sides of Steel match. The final tag team was Damaja and Basham, who appeared on an episode of Impact! and beat down VKM. They also held up Kip James so Hemme could slap him. B.G James was taken out by Basham and Damaja which led to Kip James competed against Basham and Damaja in a handicap match at Sacrifice where he lost. However, they beat Hemme's team at Slammiversary. After the match, VKM were betrayed by their associate Lance Hoyt. At Victory Road, they introduced their new manager, the Voodoo Queen, Roxxi Laveaux, to embarrass Christy Hemme. At Hard Justice, The Voodoo Kin Mafia lost to The Latin American Exchange. At No Surrender, The Voodoo Kin Mafia competed in a Ten-team tag team gauntlet match which was won by A.J. Styles and Tomko. At Bound for Glory, Kip James competed in the Fight for the Right Reverse Battle Royal which was won by Eric Young. On the October 25 edition of Impact!, VKM teamed with A.J. Styles and Tomko in a losing effort to the Latin American Xchange and the Steiner Brothers. At Genesis, B.G. was present along with Kip in the corner of Roxxi Laveaux at ringside for the Fatal Four Way knockout match for the TNA Women's Championship in which Gail Kim retained the title. At Turning Point, James competed in the Feast or Fired where he grabbed a case but threw it to BG James. It was revealed that the case was for a shot at the TNA World Tag Team Championship and BG James picked his dad to be his partner at Against All Odds, James and Bob Armstrong failed to win the titles and on February 21, 2008, episode of Impact! he turned on B.G. and B.G's father "Bullet" Bob Armstrong by hitting them both with a crutch.

==== The Beautiful People (2008–2009) ====
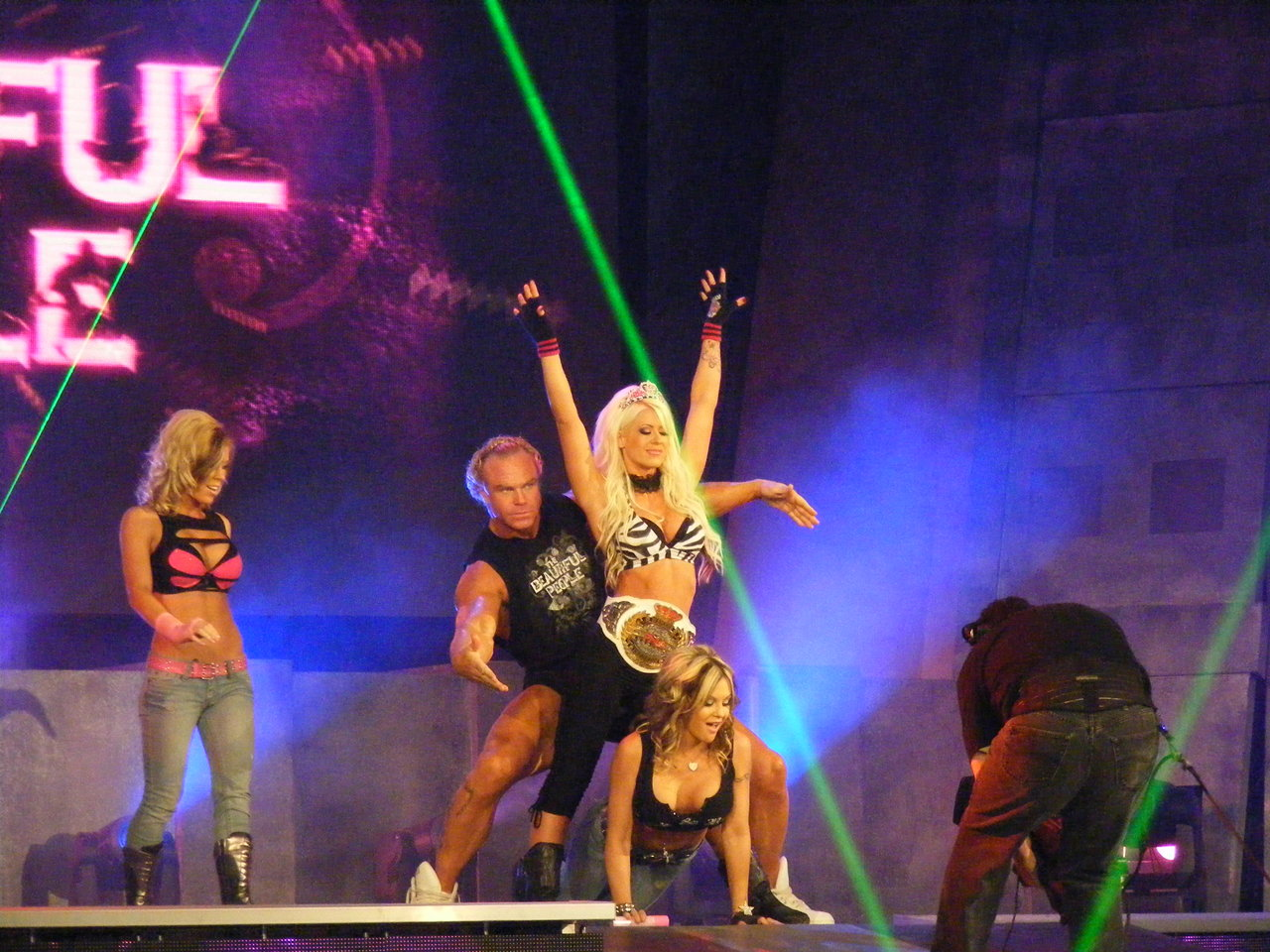
Cute Kip as part of The Beautiful People

On April 13, 2008, he faced former partner B.G. James at Lockdown and lost. After the match, he appeared to want to make amends as he raised B.G.'s hand after the match, only to clothesline him down to the mat and taunt him with a DX crotch chop. Kip went on to declare himself "The Megastar", an arrogant gimmick similar to "The One" gimmick from his WWF tenure. Kip later stopped making appearances on Impact! until April 24 when he was attacked backstage by Matt Morgan for no reason. The next week on Impact!, Kip got back at Morgan by attacking him backstage in Jim Cornette's office. On May 8, 2008, Cornette forced Morgan into being Kip's tag team partner for the Deuces Wild tournament at Sacrifice, though both were unable to win. Kip went on another brief disappearance from television until the June 5 edition of Impact!, where he partnered with Lance Hoyt and James Storm in a losing effort against Morgan and The Latin American Xchange.

On the August 14 episode of Impact!, Kip was revealed to be the new image consultant and member of The Beautiful People, dubbed Cute Kip and was using his Mr.Ass Attire, after they brought him out during their interview on Karen Angle's show Karen's Angle. At Bound for Glory IV on October 12, Kip, Love and Sky lost to Rhino, ODB and Rhaka Khan in a Bimbo Brawl. At Final Resolution on December 7, Kip competed in the Feast or Fired match but failed to get a case. At Genesis on January 11, 2009, Kip became the one-night-only replacement for the injured Kevin Nash in the Main Event Mafia.

As of March 19, Sopp was taken off of TNA Impact! along with Jacqueline Moore to become road agents. Sopp returned as Cute Kip and lost to Awesome Kong in an intergender stretcher match on the May 14 episode of Impact!. On the May 28 edition of Impact!, Kip was fired by The Beautiful People. On the June 18 edition of Impact!, Mick Foley hired him as his handyman, turning Kip into a face. he made another appearance on the August 6 edition of Impact! where Kip had to clean up the IMPACT Zone after a chaotic fifteen minute "riot". On October 9 edition of Xplosion, Kip was defeated by Rhino. On the October 30 edition of Xplosion, Kip defeated Sheik Abdul Bashir. on the November 13 edition of Xplosion, Kip lost to Rob Terry and on the December 3 edition of Xplosion, Kip competed in his final TNA match where he lost to Kiyoshi.

Sopp's profile was removed from the TNA website on December 29, confirming his departure from the promotion.

=== Independent circuit (2009–2012) ===
After leaving TNA, Sopp reunited with B.G. James to reform The New Age Outlaws, with both men resuming their Billy Gunn and Road Dogg ring names. After joining TWA Powerhouse in 2010, the Outlaws defeated Canadian Extreme to win the promotion's Tag Team Championship on July 25. They re-lost the title to Canadian Extreme on June 5, 2011.

On July 30, 2011, Sopp, working under the ring name Kip Gunn, made his debut for Lucha Libre USA as a member of the heel stable The Right. Later that night, Gunn lost in his debut match against Marco Corleone. On June 26, 2012, Sopp won the American Pro Wrestling Alliance American Championship. However, he lost the title due to travel issues. On September 8 and 9, 2012, he wrestled in a Bad Boys of Wrestling Federation tournament. He defeated Rhino in the semi-finals and Scott Steiner in the final, winning the BBWF Aruba Championship.

=== Return to WWE (2012–2015) ===
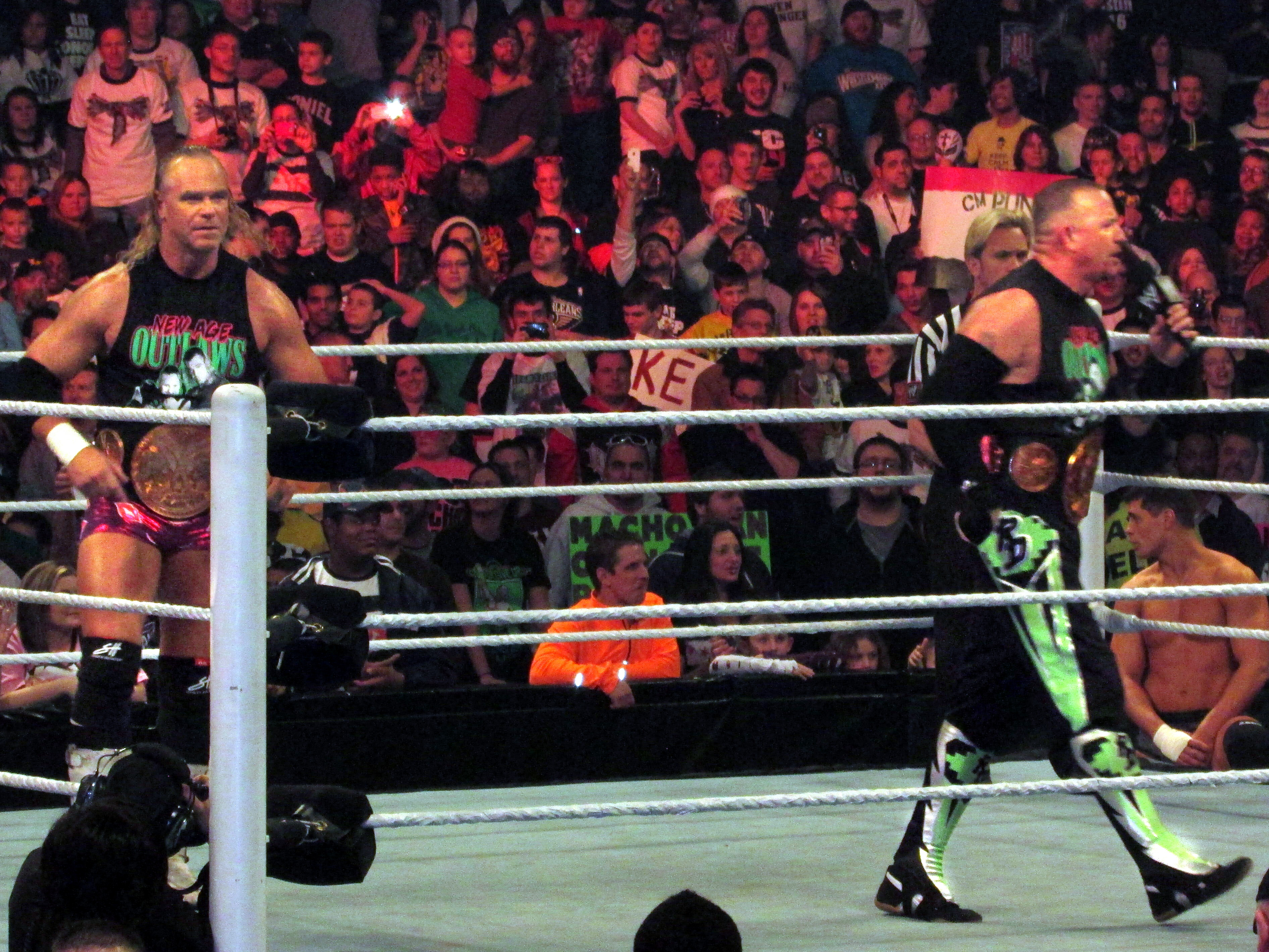
The New Age Outlaws as the WWE Tag Team Champions in 2014.

On July 23, Sopp, under his Billy Gunn name, made his first WWE appearance in nearly eight years as he reunited with Road Dogg, X-Pac, Shawn Michaels and Triple H to reform D-Generation X for one night only on the 1000th episode of Raw. In December 2012, he was hired by WWE as a trainer for the NXT Wrestling territory in Tampa, Florida. On March 4, 2013, Gunn and Road Dogg made a return at Old School Raw, defeating Primo and Epico. On March 11, 2013, they accepted a challenge from Team Rhodes Scholars and faced them in a match, which was interrupted by Brock Lesnar, who hit both Outlaws with an F-5 as part of his ongoing feud with Triple H.

He then appeared alongside Road Dogg to help CM Punk clear out The Shield in aid of Roddy Piper on Old School Raw on January 6, 2014. On the January 10 episode of SmackDown, the Outlaws teamed with CM Punk in a six-man tag match against The Shield in a losing effort. On the January 13 episode of Raw, the Outlaws again teamed with Punk in a rematch against The Shield, only to abandon Punk and lose the match. On January 26 during the Royal Rumble Kickoff Show, Gunn and Road Dogg beat Cody Rhodes and Goldust to win the WWE Tag Team Championship. The next night on Raw the New Age Outlaws retained the championship against Rhodes and Goldust via disqualification when Brock Lesnar attacked the brothers. The next week on Raw the New Age Outlaws retained the championship against Rhodes and Goldust in a steel cage match. On March 3, the Outlaws lost the Tag Team Championship to The Usos. Gunn sustained hemoptysis after he and his New Age Outlaws partner, Road Dogg, suffered a double-Triple Powerbomb by The Shield at WrestleMania XXX.

Gunn returned to Raw with Road Dogg in January 2015, attacking The Ascension along with the nWo and the APA. At the Royal Rumble, the Outlaws faced The Ascension in a losing effort. At WrestleMania 31, Gunn, with Road Dogg, X-Pac and Shawn Michaels, reunited as D-Generation X to help Triple H in his match against Sting. In May, Gunn was announced as a coach along with WWE Hall of Famers Booker T and Lita for the sixth season of Tough Enough.

On November 13, 2015, WWE officially announced that Sopp was released from his WWE contract after failing a test for performance-enhancing drugs. He had tested positive for elevated levels of testosterone at a powerlifting event on July 25, 2015, and was suspended from powerlifting for four years.

=== Return to independent circuit (2015–2020) ===
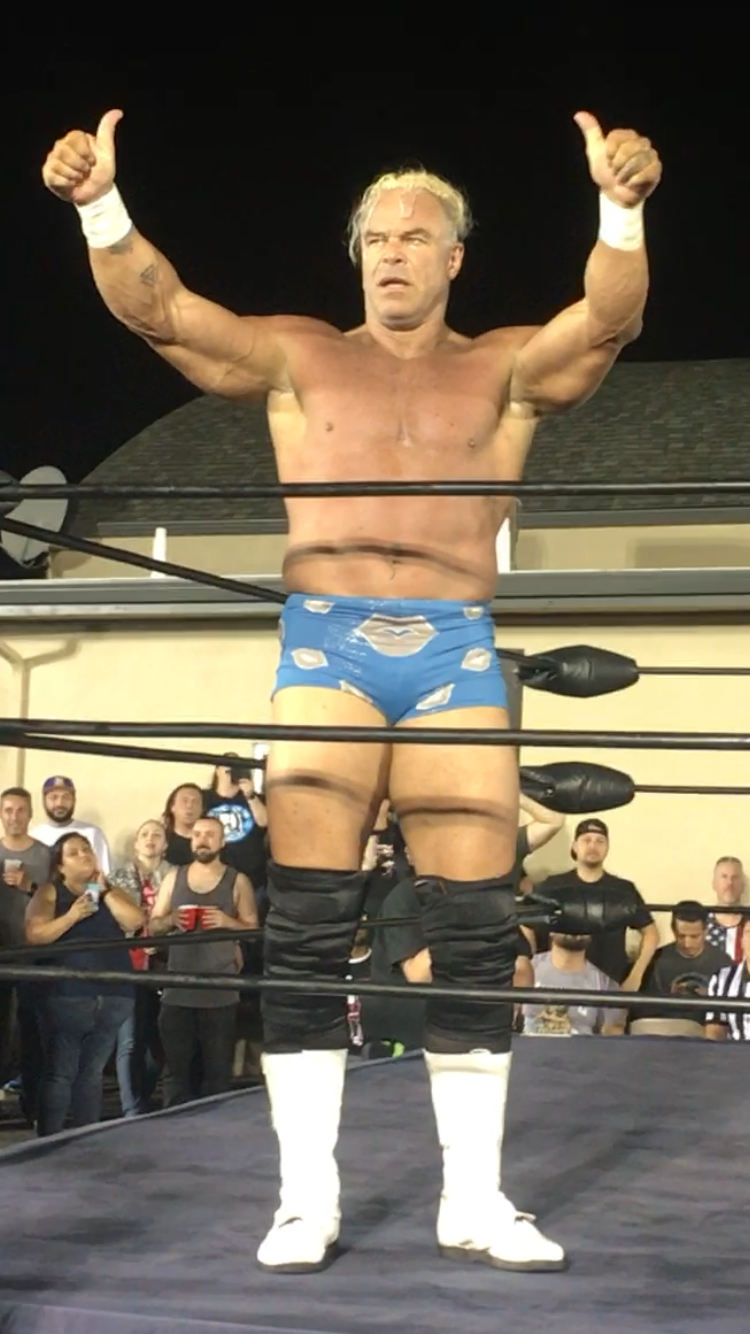
Gunn in 2019

On December 26, 2015, Gunn teamed up with Kevin Thorn to defeat Brian Klass and Rob Street. One month later, Gunn defeated Ken Dixon for the MCW Pro Wrestling MCW Rage Television Championship. On February 5, 2016, Gunn defeated Joey Hayes in the Preston City Wrestling PCW Road to Glory tournament, on February 6 he lost to T-Bone in the quarter-finals that same night Gunn teamed up with Mr. Anderson and Tajiri to defeat Dave Raynes, Joey Hayes, and Martin Kirby. On February 7, 2016, Gunn challenged for the Pro Wrestling Pride Heavyweight championship losing to Steve Griffiths. On March 19, 2016, Gunn lost the title to Ken Dixon. On June 12, 2016, Gunn won the Smashmouth Pro Wrestling championship from KC Huber but lost it on the same night, Gunn teamed again with Anderson in a losing effort against the UK Hooligans at PCW Tribute to theTroops on June 25, 2016. He defeated Hardcore Holly in a singles match at PCW Top Gunn on July 2, 2016.

On September 4, 2016, Gunn made his debut for Chikara, representing DX alongside X-Pac in a tag team gauntlet match. The two entered the match as the final team and scored the win over Prakash Sabar and The Proletariat Boar of Moldova.

=== New Japan Pro-Wrestling (2016–2017) ===
On November 5, 2016, at the New Japan Pro-Wrestling (NJPW) event Power Struggle, Yoshitatsu announced Gunn as the newest member of his Hunter Club stable and his partner for the upcoming 2016 World Tag League. Gunn and Yoshitatsu finished the tournament on December 8 with a record of three wins and four losses, failing to advance from their block. Gunn returned to NJPW on January 4, 2017, taking part in the pre-show New Japan Rumble at Wrestle Kingdom 11 in Tokyo Dome, from which he was eliminated by the eventual winner Michael Elgin. While Gunn did not appear for NJPW for the next six months, he was brought up in May by Yoshitatsu, who told Hiroshi Tanahashi that Gunn had requested a match against him. When Tanahashi captured the IWGP Intercontinental Championship the following month, he immediately nominated Gunn as his first challenger. Gunn was defeated in the title match on July 2 at G1 Special in USA, and it was his final match in NJPW.

=== Second return to WWE (2018–2019) ===
Gunn and numerous other WWE legends appeared on the January 22, 2018, episode of Raw 25 Years as part of the D-Generation X reunion. He was inducted into the WWE Hall of Fame Class of 2019 as a member of D-Generation X.

=== All Elite Wrestling (2019–present) ===
==== The Gunn Club (2019–2022) ====
In January 2019, Gunn was hired by All Elite Wrestling as a coach. At May 25 at the AEW Double or Nothing event he competed in the pre-show battle royal. Gunn made his first televised appearance for AEW on the November 20, 2019, episode of AEW Dynamite, competing in a battle royal. He also appeared during the January 1, 2020, episode of Dynamite, wrestling in a dark match with his son Austin that aired on January 7, 2020. They wrestled again together on another dark match during the January 8, 2020, episode of Dynamite, airing on January 17, 2020, with the tag team name "The Gunn Club", defeating the team of Peter Avalon and Shawn Spears. Gunn has also appeared in the crowd (made up of AEW wrestlers and other employees) on numerous episodes of Dynamite during the COVID-19 pandemic. On the May 27, 2020, episode of Dynamite, Gunn, now under the shortened ring name of Billy, participated in a battle royal match to determine the number one contender for the AEW TNT Championship. He also would wrestle MJF in a singles match on the June 17, 2020, episode of Dynamite as well. The Gunn Club would wrestle in more tag team matches on more episodes of AEW Dark.

On the November 4, 2020, episode of Dynamite, The Gunn Club teamed with Cody Rhodes to successfully defeat The Dark Order (John Silver, 10 and Colt Cabana). On the November 17, 2020, episode of Dark, The Gunn Club, which now added Austin's brother and Gunn's other son Colten to the stable, defeated Bshp King, Joey O'Riley and Sean Maluta by pinfall in a six-man tag team match. On the same day, the AEW website's roster page got updated and his name was once again changed to its long form, Billy Gunn. The three man Gunn Club would then defeat Cezar Bononi, KTB, and Seth Gargis in another six man tag team match on the November 24, 2020, episode of Dark. On the December 8, 2020, episode of Dark The three man Gunn Club-which entered the ring on a golf cart with the words "Taz Taxi" on the side, defeated Shawn Dean, Sean Maluta & RYZIN. On the December 1, 2021, episode of Dynamite, The Gunn Club stable's undefeated streak in AEW ended when Billy and Colten Gunn lost to the team of Sting and Darby Allin. On the April 15, 2022, episode of AEW Rampage, the Gunn Club lost a six-man tag team match to Blackpool Combat Club (Bryan Danielson, Jon Moxley, and Wheeler Yuta), after Yuta pinned Billy.

==== The Acclaimed (2022–2025) ====
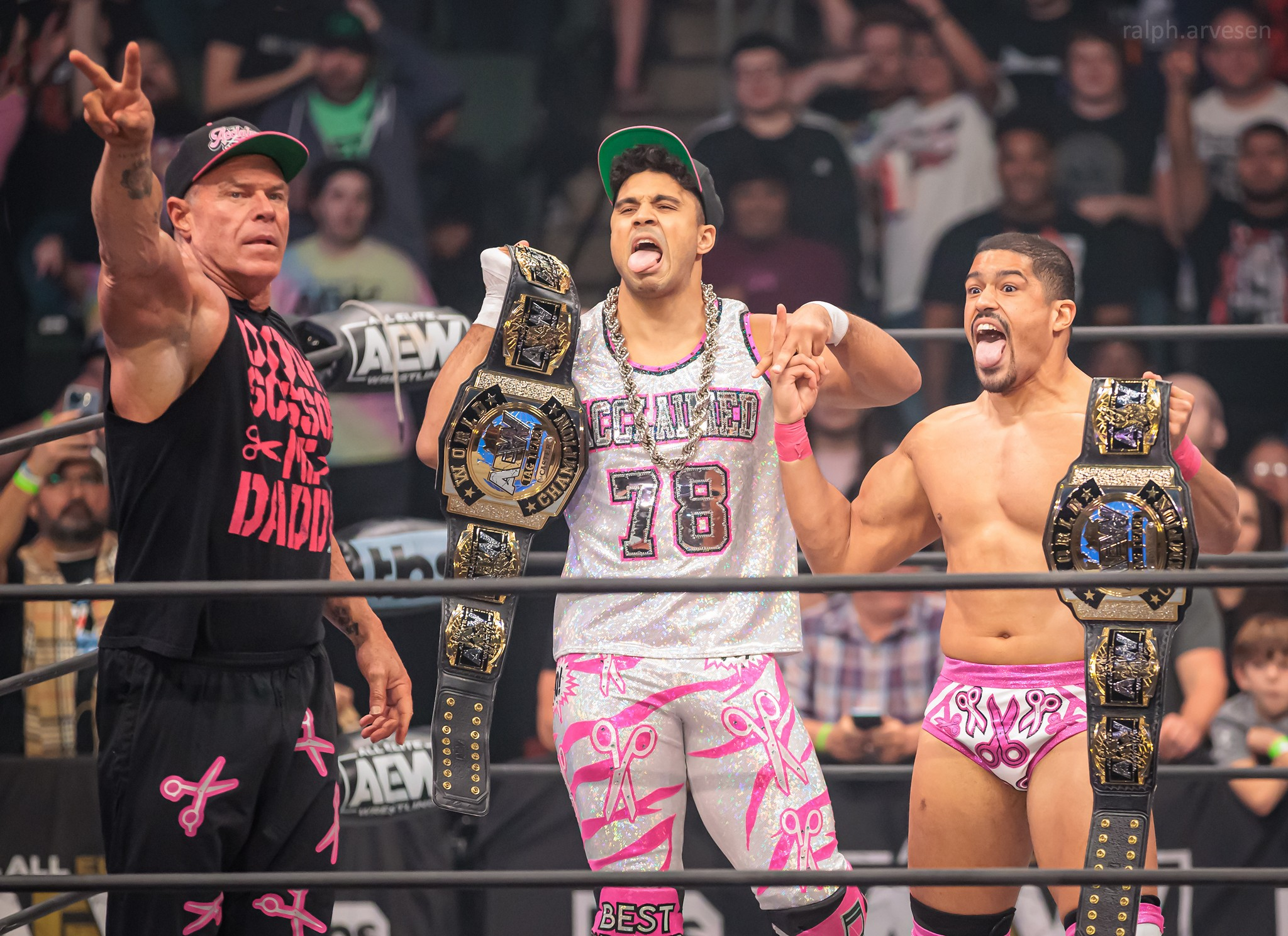
Gunn alongside Max Caster and Anthony Bowens, the Acclaimed, in 2022

On the August 17, 2022, episode of Dynamite, the Gunn Club ended when both of his sons turned against him and joined Stokely Hathaway. The Acclaimed (Max Caster and Anthony Bowens) came to Gunn's aid and Gunn began managing the duo. While paired with the Acclaimed, Bowens affectionately coined Gunn as Daddy Ass, a reference to Gunn's 1999 WWF "Mr. Ass" persona. On September 21, 2022, at Dynamite: Grand Slam, the Acclaimed successfully capture the AEW World Tag Team Championship with a win over Swerve in Our Glory (Swerve Strickland and Keith Lee). On August 27, 2023, at All In, Gunn and The Acclaimed won the AEW World Trios Championship from The House of Black (Malakai Black, Brody King, and Buddy Matthews) in a "House Rules" No Holds Barred six-man tag team match. At Dynasty: Zero Hour on April 21, 2024, ROH World Six-Man Tag Team Champions Bullet Club Gold (Jay White and The Gunns) defeated Gunn and The Acclaimed for the AEW World Trios Championship in a winner takes all championship unification match to unify the titles as the Unified World Trios Championship, ending their reign at a record 238 days. In January 2025 on the Maximum Carnage special episode of Collision, The Acclaimed disbanded after months of dissension.

==== Managing Anthony Bowens and sporadic appearances (2025–present) ====
On April 6 at Dynasty Zero Hour, Gunn returned after a brief hiatus as the manager for Bowens and was ringside when Bowens defeated Caster. On the July 26 episode of Collision, Bowens began teasing a heel turn after assaulting Caster following their match, and had to be held back by Gunn. Afterwards, Gunn ceased appearing with Bowens and was taken off television due to a back injury.

Gunn returned from injury on the January 24, 2026 episode of Collision, teaming with his son Austin in a losing effort against ProtoShita (Konosuke Takeshita and Kyle Fletcher).

=== Third return to WWE (2021–present) ===
In 2021, Gunn has signed a WWE Legends contract where he can appear in multiple video games, action figures and other merchandise.

=== Maple Leaf Pro Wrestling (2026–present) ===
In July 2026, Gunn revealed that he had been working for Maple Leaf Pro Wrestling (MLP) as a producer.

== Other media ==
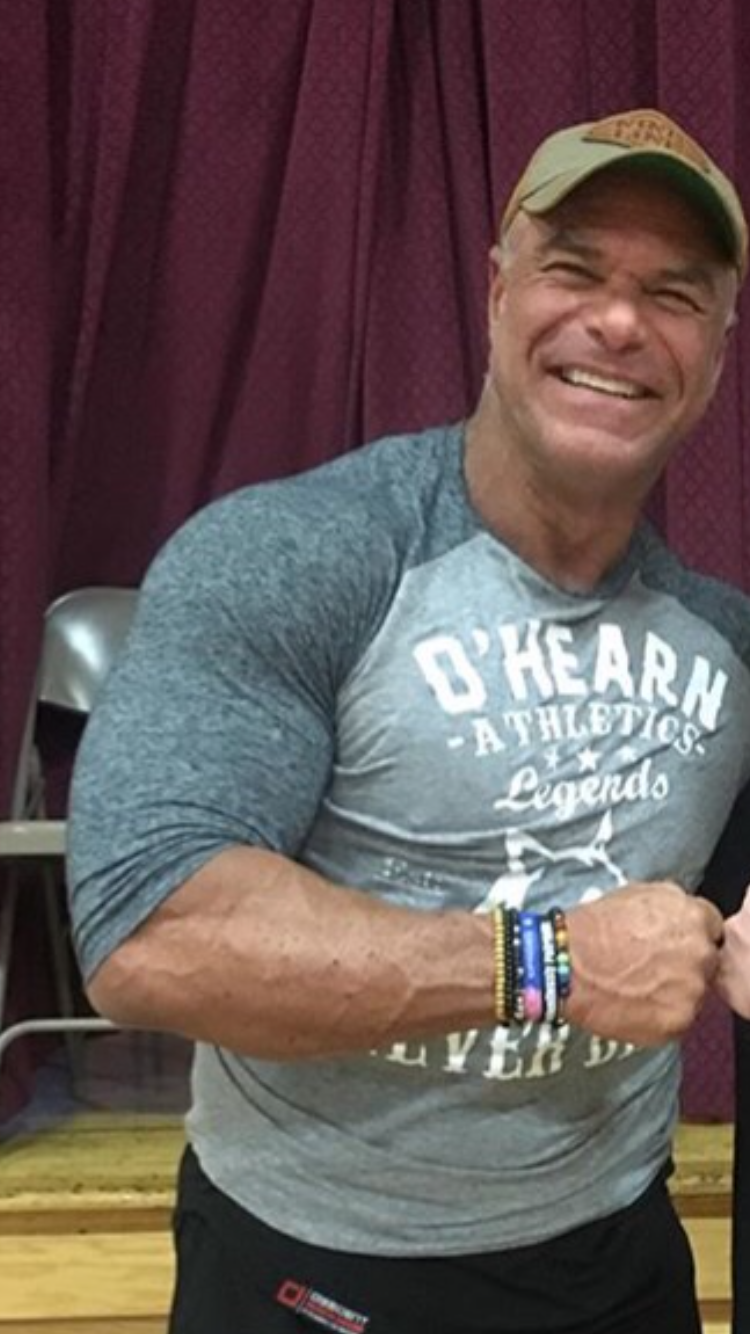
Gunn in 2019 before an independent wrestling show

=== Filmography ===
Film
Year	Title	Role	Notes
2012	Double Fury	Wincott	
2010	The Other Guys	Kip James	(uncredited)

Television
Year	Title	Role	Notes
2000	Sabrina The Teenage Witch	Xavier "The Avenger" Prescott	

=== Video games ===
- WWF Attitude
- WWF WrestleMania 2000
- WWF SmackDown!
- WWF No Mercy
- WWF SmackDown! 2: Know Your Role
- WWF Road To WrestleMania
- WWF SmackDown! Just Bring It
- WWF Raw
- WWE SmackDown! Shut Your Mouth
- WWE Crush Hour
- WWE Raw 2
- WWE '13
- WWE 2K16
- WWE 2K17
- WWE 2K25
- WWE 2K26

== Personal life ==
Sopp married his first wife Tina Tinnell in 1990. Together they had two sons: Colten and Austin, who are both professional wrestlers working for All Elite Wrestling. Sopp and Tinnell separated in 2000 and finalized their divorce in December 2002. Sopp has since married his long-time girlfriend Paula on January 24, 2009.

Sopp has said that he has asthma and uses an inhaler.

Before becoming a professional wrestler, Sopp studied agribusiness at Sam Houston State University.

== Championships and accomplishments ==
- All Elite Wrestling
  - AEW World Trios Championship (1 time) – with Max Caster and Anthony Bowens
- American Pro Wrestling Alliance
  - APWA American Championship (1 time)
- Bad Boys of Wrestling Federation
  - BBFW Aruba Championship (1 time, inaugural)
  - BBFW Aruba Championship Tournament (2012)
- International Wrestling Federation
  - IWF Tag Team Championship (2 times) – with Brett Colt
- Freedom Pro Wrestling
  - FPW Tag Team Championship (1 time) – with Road Dogg
- Maryland Championship Wrestling
  - MCW Rage Television Championship (1 time)
  - MCW Tag Team Championship (1 time) – with B.G. James
- New South Wrestling
  - NSW Heavyweight Championship (1 time)
- Pro Wrestling Illustrated
  - Tag Team of the Year (1998) with Road Dogg
  - Tag Team of the Year (2002) with Chuck
  - Ranked #39 of the top 500 singles wrestlers in the PWI 500 in 1999
  - Ranked #231 of the top 500 singles wrestlers of the "PWI Years" in 2003
  - Ranked #43 of the top 100 tag teams of the "PWI Years" with Road Dogg in 2003
- SmashMouth Pro Wrestling
  - SPW World Heavyweight Championship (1 time)
- TWA Powerhouse
  - TWA Tag Team Championship (1 time) – with B.G. James
- Vanguard Championship Wrestling
  - VCW Heavyweight Championship (1 time)
- World Pro Wrestling
  - WPW World Heavyweight Championship (1 time)
- Wrestling Observer Newsletter
  - Worst Worked Match of the Year (2006) TNA Reverse Battle Royal on TNA Impact!
- WWE/World Wrestling Federation/Entertainment
  - WWF Hardcore Championship (2 times)
  - WWF Intercontinental Championship (1 time)
  - WWE Tag Team Championship (1 time) – with Road Dogg
  - WWF/E Tag Team Championship (10 times) – with Bart Gunn (3), Road Dogg (5) and Chuck (2)
  - King of the Ring (1999)
  - Raw Bowl – with Bart Gunn
  - WWE Hall of Fame (Class of 2019) – as a member of D-Generation X
