= TNA Against All Odds (2006) =

2006 Total Nonstop Action Wrestling pay-per-view event

Against All Odds (2006)
- DVD cover featuring Christian Cage and Jeff Jarrett
- Promotion: Total Nonstop Action Wrestling
- Date: February 12, 2006
- City: Orlando, Florida
- Venue: TNA Impact! Zone
- Attendance: 775

Pay-per-view chronology
← Previous; Final Resolution	Next → Destination X

Against All Odds chronology
← Previous; 2005	Next → 2007

The 2006 Against All Odds was a professional wrestling pay-per-view (PPV) event produced by Total Nonstop Action Wrestling (TNA), which took place on February 12, 2006 at the Impact! Zone in Orlando, Florida. It was the second event under the Against All Odds chronology. Eight matches were featured on the event's card.

In October 2017, with the launch of the Global Wrestling Network, the event became available to stream on demand.

== Storylines ==
The event featured professional wrestling matches that involve different wrestlers from pre-existing scripted feuds and storylines. Professional wrestlers portray villains, heroes, or less distinguishable characters in the scripted events that build tension and culminate in a wrestling match or series of matches.

== Event ==
Other on-screen personnel
Role:	Name:
Commentator	Mike Tenay
Commentator	Don West
Interviewer	Jeremy Borash
Ring announcer	Jeremy Borash
Ring announcer	David Penzer
Referee	Earl Hebner
Referee	Rudy Charles
Referee	Mark Johnson
Referee	Andrew Thomas

Prior to the start of the pay-per-view there were two dark matches. The first match saw Ron Killings defeat A-1, after the referee sent Team Canada to the back. The second match saw Lance Hoyt, Cassidy Riley and Shark Boy defeat Shannon Moore and The Diamonds in the Rough (Elix Skipper and David Young), after Hoyt chokeslammed Elix.

The opening match saw The Naturals (Andy Douglas and Chase Stevens) take on Austin Aries and Roderick Strong. After Aries delivered a double knee buster to Douglas, both Aries and Strong delivered a series of kicks to Douglas. Aries suplexes Douglas and rolls him up for the cover however Douglas grabs the bottom rope to break the count. The Naturals pick up the victory after hitting Natural Disaster on Aries.

The second match was a X Division four-way match that saw Jay Lethal defeat Matt Bentley, Alex Shelley and Petey Williams.

The following match was a tag team match between The James Gang (B.G. James and Kip James) and The Latin American Exchange (Homicide and Machete). The match ended with all four men in the ring, after Kip attacked Homicide, BG hit Machete with the pump handle slam for the victory.

The NWA World Tag Team Championship match was next. The champions America's Most Wanted (Chris Harris and James Storm) defended their titles against Chris Sabin and Sonjay Dutt. After Harris hit Sabin with a tornado DDT on a chair, Storm hit Sabin’s ankle with the security railing. With Sabin injured, America’s Most Wanted hit Dutt with the Death Sentence to retain the titles.

The next match was a Falls Count Anywhere match between Rhino and Abyss, which had been hyped in promos throughout the night. The match started when Rhino charged the ring and went right after Abyss. The match saw tables, chairs, staple guns and baseball bats used, and eventually they made their way to the parking lot. While back in the arena, Abyss rams Rhino through a wall. The match ended when Rhino hit Abyss with the Gore, followed by Abyss falling out of the bleachers, through four tables, and onto the floor. Rhino climbs his way down and covers Abyss for the victory.

The TNA X Division Championship was defended next in a 3-Way Dance, that saw the champion Samoa Joe defend his title against A.J. Styles and Christopher Daniels. The match ended after Joe hit the Muscle Buster on AJ after sending Daniels to the floor, enabling him to retain the championship.

The second to last match saw Team Canada (Bobby Roode and Eric Young) take on Team 3D (Brother Ray and Brother Devon). The match began after Team 3D snuck up on Team Canada, and both teams went at each other. After Young hit Ray with a hockey stick he went to try and hit a moonsault from the top, however Ray was able to move out of the way. Team 3D used this opening to hit Young with a 3D and pick up the victory. After the match, all of America’s Most Wanted came into the ring and began attacking Team 3D. Ron Killings came out to make the save, and Team 3D put Young through the table.

The final match saw NWA World Heavyweight Champion Jeff Jarrett defend his title against Christian Cage. After Cage powerbombs Gail Kim, Jarrett gets hit by the Unprettier by Cage, who picks up the victory and the title. Following the match, Rhino joins Cage in the ring to celebrate, followed by fans going into the ring as fireworks go off.

== Results ==
No.	Results	Stipulations	Times
1^{P}	Ron Killings defeated A-1	Singles match	1:43
2^{P}	Lance Hoyt, Cassidy Riley and Shark Boy defeated Shannon Moore and The Diamonds in the Rough (Elix Skipper and David Young) (with Simon Diamond)	Six-man tag team match	5:49
3	The Naturals (Andy Douglas and Chase Stevens) defeated Austin Aries and Roderick Strong	Tag team match	10:28
4	Jay Lethal defeated Matt Bentley (with Traci), Alex Shelley and Petey Williams	X Division Four-Way match	10:37
5	The James Gang (B.G. James and Kip James) defeated The Latin American Exchange (Homicide and Machete) (with Konnan)	Tag team match	6:00
6	America's Most Wanted (Chris Harris and James Storm) (c) defeated Chris Sabin and Sonjay Dutt	Tag team match for the NWA World Tag Team Championship	10:26
7	Rhino defeated Abyss (with James Mitchell)	Falls Count Anywhere match	15:25
8	Samoa Joe (c) defeated A.J. Styles and Christopher Daniels	Three-Way match for the TNA X Division Championship	16:02
9	Team 3D (Brother Ray and Brother Devon) defeated Team Canada (Bobby Roode and Eric Young) (with Coach D'Amore)	Tag team match	13:55
10	Christian Cage defeated Jeff Jarrett (c) (with Gail Kim)	Singles match for the NWA World Heavyweight Championship	16:23
(c) / – the champion(s) heading into the match; P / – the match was broadcast on the pre-show
