= Matt Bentley =

American professional wrestler (born 1979)

- Bentley at TNA Lockdown in 2007

Personal information
- Born: Matthew James Bentley; December 10, 1979 (age 46) Clinton, Iowa, U.S.
- Family: Shawn Michaels (cousin)
- Website: OfficialMattBentley.com

Professional wrestling career
- Ring name(s): Martyr; Matt Bentley; Maverick Matt; Michael Shane; Omega Griffon; Omega Verifan
- Billed height: 6 ft 0 in (183 cm)
- Billed weight: 221 lb (100 kg)
- Billed from: San Antonio, Texas, U.S.
- Trained by: Texas Wrestling Academy (Rudy Boy González); Shawn Michaels
- Debut: 1999
- Retired: 2015

Matthew James Bentley (born December 10, 1979), is an American retired professional wrestler best known for his work in Total Nonstop Action Wrestling (TNA) under the ring names Michael Shane and "Maverick" Matt Bentley.

== Professional wrestling career ==
=== Early career (1999–2003) ===
Bentley was trained by his cousin, professional wrestler Shawn Michaels, and he took the ring name Michael Shane, a play on his cousin's name, originating from Michaels' guest appearance in Pacific Blue. Additionally, Bentley utilized Michaels' signature superkick maneuver as his own finisher.

After being trained at Shawn Michaels' Texas Wrestling Academy, Bentley competed in Japan for the Frontier Martial-Arts Wrestling promotion. He also briefly worked for Extreme Championship Wrestling (ECW) from October 2000 to the final show of the promotion on January 13, 2001. After ECW closed, Bentley returned to Japan, where he wrestled under a mask as Omega Verfian. During this time he also made appearances for both the World Wrestling Federation and World Championship Wrestling in dark matches. He also worked as a jobber on WWE's programs WWE Velocity and Sunday Night Heat.

Bentley wrestled for Ring of Honor (ROH) wrestler, with his breakout match occurring against Paul London at the Unscripted event in September 2002, that concluded with London hitting the shooting star press off a ladder. ROH later described the match as a "match of the year candidate". He was also a member of The Group faction in ROH, with Samoa Joe and C. W. Anderson, but they were forced to disband after losing to The Prophecy at Night of Grudges on June 14, 2003. He later wrestled for Major League Wrestling, where he was managed by Francine, and returned to Japan to compete for Zero-One Wrestling.

=== Total Nonstop Action Wrestling (2003–2007) ===
Bentley joined TNA in 2003. He competed in the X Division, quickly winning the TNA X Division Championship in the first ever Ultimate X match. Later in 2003, Bentley formed a stable with Shane Douglas and Traci known as "The New Franchise". In January 2004, he lost the X Division Championship to Chris Sabin in Ultimate X2. The New Franchise disbanded in April 2004 when Bentley turned on Douglas. Traci ended up staying with Bentley as a valet.

In June, A.J. Styles returned to the X Division and won the X Division Championship from Kazarian. In an effort to eliminate Styles from the X Division, Bentley and Traci formed a tag team with Kazarian (informally known by the portmanteau of their last names, Shazarian). On July 28, 2004, Bentley and Kazarian defeated Styles in an Ultimate X match when they both pulled down the championship. Surprisingly, the duo was declared co-champions, a first for the X Division Championship. They lost the title in a Gauntlet for the Gold match two weeks later. Shazarian split up in early 2005 when Kazarian left TNA and signed with WWE.

Traci quietly left Bentley in 2005 to become an assistant for TNA Director of Authority Dusty Rhodes, and later joined with Chris Sabin. In turn, Trinity became Bentley's valet. At Hard Justice, however, in a match between Bentley and Trinity and Sabin and Traci, Bentley and Traci turned on their partners and reunited. In July 2005, Bentley was forced to refrain from using the "Michael Shane" alias, which he had used for his entire career, following threats of legal action from World Wrestling Entertainment, the employers of Mike Shane, who had trademarked his name, something which Bentley had neglected to do. After going simply by the name Michael, Bentley decided to go by his real name. All TNA DVD releases featuring matches with Bentley as "Michael Shane" have had the on-screen graphics altered and commentary completely replaced to reflect the name change. One such DVD is the pay-per-view Lockdown, included in the "TNA Anthology: The Epic Set" box set, in which you can still see the name "Michael Shane" on the entrance video playing in the background when he makes his entrance.

Bentley in 2005

After a disappearance from television due to contract renegotiations and a few matches in the X Division, Bentley and Traci turned into fan favorites, largely because of the crowd, which was doing the "Bentley Bounce" at the time. On a February 2006 edition of Xplosion, Bentley and his partner Lance Hoyt had some miscommunication during their tag team against the Diamonds in the Rough. After the match, Bentley snapped and attacked Hoyt, thus turning him into a villain. The next week on Impact! in an interview Bentley announced he was a "Maverick", and thus became "Maverick Matt". He continued feuding with Hoyt, and lost to him at Destination X. He would then wrestle a few more matches, most being 6-man tag team matches, losing every time. Bentley did not appear on TNA television for the next four months.

Bentley returned on the July 20, 2006 edition of Impact!, teaming with former partner Frankie Kazarian, who had returned earlier in the week, in a loss against The Naturals. Traci did not return with Bentley, instead becoming Ms. Brooks, Robert Roode's new valet.

On the October 26, 2006 edition of Impact!, Bentley appeared in the "Raven's Perch" section of the Impact Zone bleachers, debuting a goth look. Weeks later, Bentley and Kazarian, along with Johnny Devine, formed the stable Serotonin, with Raven as their leader. As part of the new group Bentley's name was changed to Martyr, who along with Kaz and Havok (Devine) portrayed a strange rocker type look and would not win a lot of matches - as a matter of fact, even if they won, Raven would come out, make them get on their knees and beat them with a Kendo stick (as part of a system dubbed "torture breeds success"). In August 2007, Bentley's TNA contract expired and was not renewed.

=== Late career (2007–2015) ===
On April 4, 2008, Bentley made an appearance on Friday Night SmackDown in a squash match, losing to the debuting Vladimir Kozlov. Following his WWE appearance, Bentley temporarily left wrestling in order to create a band named "Lost in Chaos" with his friends. They are currently located in Orlando and participating in numerous gigs. The band was nominated for Florida's Best Band on a local rock station website in 2009.

On June 27, 2011, Bentley made a one night return to TNA at the tapings of the June 30 edition of Impact Wrestling, losing an opportunity at earning a TNA contract when Low Ki pinned Jimmy Yang in a three–way first round match of an X-Division tournament, where the winner of the tournament would receive a TNA contract. On January 12, 2013, Bentley took part in the taping of TNA's One Night Only: X-Travaganza special (aired on April 5, 2013), competing in a seven-man Xscape match, which was won by Christian York.

On September 5, 2015, Bentley made his Global Force Wrestling debut defeating Kevin Matthews and Mark Sterling in a three-Way match as part of the GFW Grand Slam Tour.

== Championships and accomplishments ==
- CyberSpace Wrestling Federation
  - CSWF Cruiser X Championship (1 time)
  - CWF His and Hers Tag Team Championship (1 time) – with Traci Brooks
- Florida Professional Wrestling Association
  - FPWA Heavyweight Championship (1 time)
- Pro Wrestling Illustrated
  - Ranked No. 27 of the top 500 singles wrestlers in the PWI 500 in 2004
- Showtime Allstar Wrestling
  - SAW International Championship (1 time)
- Southern Tennessee Wrestling Federation
  - STWF Tag Team Championship (1 time) – with Greg Buchanan
- Texas Wrestling Alliance
  - TWA Television Championship (1 time)
- Total Nonstop Action Wrestling
  - TNA X Division Championship (2 times)^{1}
  - TNA Year End Awards (2 times)
    - Match of the Year (2003) vs. Chris Sabin and Frankie Kazarian on August 20
    - X Division Star of the Year (2003)
- USA Xtreme Wrestling
  - UXW United States Championship (1 time)

^{1}Shane and Frankie Kazarian were declared co-champions after defeating AJ Styles in an Ultimate X match at the weekly pay-per-view #104 by grabbing the belt at the same time. This co-reign was the second time that both men had won the championship.
