= New Age Outlaws =

Was a Professional wrestling tag team

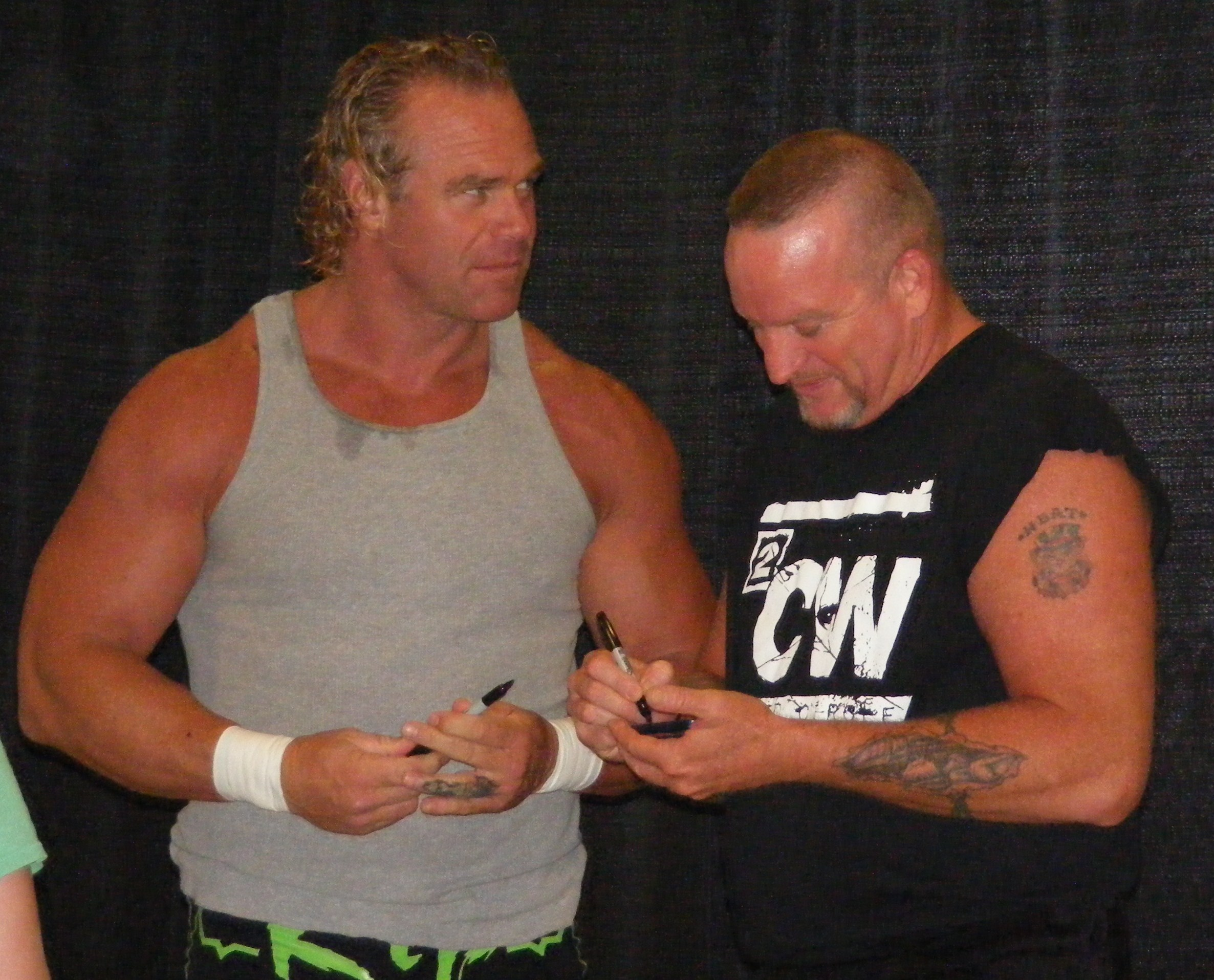
- Billy Gunn (left) and Road Dogg (right) in September 2011

Tag team
- Members: Road Dogg Jesse James / B.G. James; Billy Gunn / Kip James / Rockabilly
- Name(s): The New Age Outlaws; The James Gang; Voodoo Kin Mafia; The Roadie And Rockabilly
- Billed heights: Jesse James / B.G. James: 6 ft 1 in (1.85 m); Billy Gunn / Kip James: 6 ft 5 in (1.96 m)
- Combined billed weight: 501 lb (227 kg)
- Debut: October 4, 1997
- Disbanded: May 2, 1999 February 28, 2000
- Years active: 1997–2000; 2006–2008; 2012–2019

The New Age Outlaws were an American professional wrestling tag team in World Wrestling Federation (WWF) made up of Brian James ("Road Dogg" Jesse James) and Monty Sopp ("Badd Ass" Billy Gunn). The duo became popular in the late 1990s as members of the second incarnation of the professional wrestling stable D-Generation X. Regarded as one of the greatest tag teams of all time, the promotion has described James and Gunn as "the most popular duo of WWE's Attitude Era."

Upon parting ways with the WWF, the team reformed in several promotions, mostly notably in Total Nonstop Action Wrestling where, under the ringnames B.G. James and Kip James, they performed collectively as the James Gang and then as the Voodoo Kin Mafia, the latter of which was a play on the initials of their former boss in the WWF Vince McMahon. The team returned to periodic active competition in WWE under its original name in 2013 (with both members also having full-time backstage jobs with the company as well). Today only James is employed with the WWE in a backstage role while Sopp currently performs in All Elite Wrestling although the team are under a Legends contract for the WWE.

They are six-time tag team champions in WWE, having held the WWF World Tag Team Championship five times and the WWE Tag Team Championship once. The duo hold the record for the most time between title reigns in WWE history after becoming the WWE Tag Team Champions at the 2014 Royal Rumble PPV, more than 14 years after their previous Tag Team title reign.

== History ==
=== World Wrestling Federation ===
==== Formation (1997) ====
The Outlaws first formed on the October 4, 1997 episode of Shotgun Saturday Night when struggling superstars Billy Gunn and "Road Dogg" Jesse James, then known as Rockabilly and "The Real Double J" Jesse James respectively, ended their feud and teamed up.

On the October 11, 1997 edition of Shotgun, Jesse James walked out to the ring following a loss by Rockabilly to Flash Funk and asked him to turn on his manager The Honky Tonk Man, who had been responsible for Rockabilly's defeat, and team with him. Rockabilly answered by smashing a guitar on Honky Tonk Man's head and agreeing to team with James. Rockabilly re-dubbed himself "Badd Ass" Billy Gunn and Jesse James rechristened himself the Road Dogg. The team made an immediate impact on the WWF tag team scene with blatant attacks against other tag teams and, initially not having an entrance theme, walking out to the ring with only Road Dogg making a rant against their opponents over the PA system. The team became known for pulling wins out of nowhere via cheating and use of weapons. Through their attitude, charisma and antics, they began to get over with the crowd as heels.

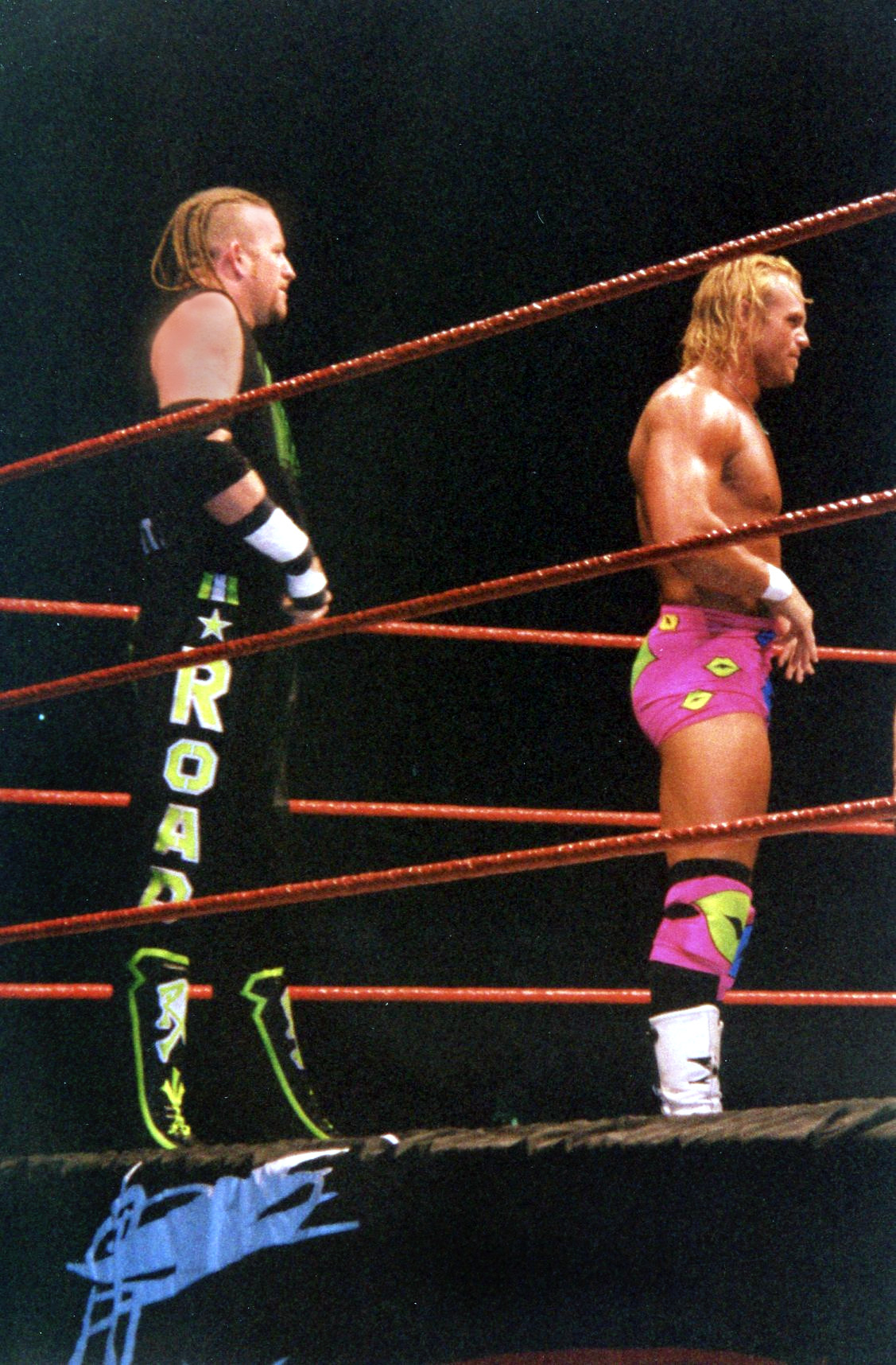
Road Dogg and Gunn in April 1999, Newcastle

==== Tag Team Champions and D-Generation X (1997–1999) ====
James and Gunn defeated the Legion of Doom for the Tag Team Championship in November 1997. This marked Gunn's fourth Tag Team Title reign and Road Dogg's first. Not only did the team win the titles that night, but they also got their "Outlaws" nickname when they "stole" the win and then ran to a waiting car, prompting Raw announcer Jim Ross to liken them to outlaws leaving a robbery. The name 'New Age Outlaws' was first used during their feud with LOD on the December 15 episode of Monday Night Raw; the Outlaws joined Triple H and Shawn Michaels, collectively known as D-Generation X, in assaulting the team, including shaving off one of Road Warrior Hawk's mohawks and throwing Road Warrior Animal through the announcers' table. The name stuck and the New Age Outlaws quickly became one of the most hated teams in the WWF.

Shortly before the Royal Rumble in 1998, the New Age Outlaws began a feud with Mick Foley, first fighting him as Dude Love, then as Mankind and finally Cactus Jack. When it became apparent that he needed help dealing with the Outlaws, Foley brought in Terry Funk as Chainsaw Charlie. Following a disqualification against The Legion of Doom at the Royal Rumble, the team were confronted by DX who told them they needed to start making waves by acting more controversially. In response to this, the Outlaws locked Cactus Jack and Chainsaw Charlie in a dumpster and threw it off the entrance ramp on to the concrete floor. The Outlaws initially looked concerned, but ultimately attacked their injured rivals in what Foley would describe as "one of the funnier examples of bad sportsmanship". At WrestleMania XIV, the New Age Outlaws lost the titles to Cactus Jack and Chainsaw Charlie in a Dumpster match. The next night on Raw, however, with the aid of Triple H and X-Pac, the Outlaws regained the titles in a steel cage match and officially joined DX.

The growing popularity of the "new" DX quickly turned the group from heels to tweeners, eventually becoming faces, and they feuded with many different tag teams over the course of 1998. Their immense popularity was part of what helped the WWF challenge World Championship Wrestling for ratings supremacy during the Monday Night War. They lost the tag title to Kane and Mankind in the summer of 1998, only to regain the titles from that same team at SummerSlam in a handicap match after Kane no-showed. In late 1998 Vince McMahon's Corporation tried to tempt the Outlaws away from DX and failed, which led to the Outlaws losing the title to Corporation members Ken Shamrock and Big Boss Man.

==== Singles competition, reunion and split (1999–2000) ====
As 1999 started, the Outlaws slowly began to drift apart, with each man striving for singles gold. Road Dogg held both the Hardcore Title and the Intercontinental Championship in the first few months of 1999 (including a successful IC title defense at Wrestlemania XV), and Gunn briefly held the Hardcore title as well. In March, the pair started to team once again, leading to a match with Jeff Jarrett and Owen Hart at Backlash in April. A week later, Gunn turned heel on Road Dogg, resulting in a feud and a match at Over the Edge. The following month, Gunn went on to win the King of the Ring tournament.

During the fall of 1999 the Outlaws reunited, first as faces, but then as heels when they rejoined the reformed and now heel DX. No Way Out saw the final end of the Outlaws when Gunn received a serious arm injury during a match with the Dudley Boyz. Gunn was soon kicked out of DX after "losing his cool" and getting into a fight with all of the DX members; in reality, he needed to have surgery to repair his torn rotator cuff. The two would reunite one more time as faces at Survivor Series, teaming up with K Kwik and former DX teammate Chyna against the Radicalz in a traditional Survivor Series match. Afterwards Road Dogg continued to team with K-Kwik. Gunn went on his own. Road Dogg was released from his WWF contract in January 2001 due to ongoing drug issues while Gunn was released from his contract in November 2004 after eleven years with the company.

=== Total Nonstop Action Wrestling ===
==== 3 Live Kru (2002–2005) ====
On September 18, 2002, "Road Dogg" Jesse James debuted in Total Nonstop Action Wrestling under his birth name B.G. James. In July 2003, he formed a stable with Konnan and Ron "The Truth" Killings known as The 3Live Kru (3LK). The trio went on to become fan favorites and eventually won the NWA World Tag Team Championship on two occasions, which they defended collectively under the Freebird Rule. Billy Gunn debuted in TNA at Against All Odds on February 13, 2005, interfering in the NWA World Heavyweight Championship bout between Jeff Jarrett and the challenging Kevin Nash. Gunn struck Nash with a chair, but he was able to kick out of Jarrett's subsequent pin attempt. After Gunn seized the NWA World Heavyweight Championship belt in order to strike Nash with it, B.G. James ran to the ring and wrestled it away from him.

B.G. James and Gunn, now renamed The New Age Outlaw (later shortened to just The Outlaw), came into conflict once more on April 24, at Lockdown, when Jarrett, The Outlaw and Monty Brown faced Diamond Dallas Page, Sean Waltman and B.G. James (who was replacing an injured Kevin Nash) in a Lethal Lockdown match. Page, Waltman and James were victorious, although during the match James and The Outlaw refrained from fighting one another. Through October and November 2005, "The Outlaw" (now using the name Kip James, due to threats from the WWE that "The Outlaw" sounded too similar to their trademarked New Age Outlaws name) helped 3LK numerous times during their feud with Team Canada. Although he was obviously helping the Kru at every turn, Konnan refused to trust Kip.

On the November 26 episode of TNA Impact!, and even though Konnan had his doubts, 3LK inducted Kip into the group and renamed themselves the 4Live Kru. At Turning Point, however, Konnan turned on the group, eventually forming his own group, The Latin American Xchange (LAX). Killings also went out on his own afterward, leaving only Kip and B.G. together.

==== The James Gang (2006) ====
On January 14, 2006, Kip James and B.G. James, now calling themselves The James Gang, announced that they had reunited in the face of Konnan and his new group after LAX attacked B.G.'s real-life father "Bullet" Bob Armstrong. Their official in-ring reunion took place the next night at Final Resolution, where they defeated The Diamonds in the Rough. Their feud with LAX continued and included several more appearances by "Bullet" Bob Armstrong, including an Arm Wrestling match between Konnan and the 67-year-old Armstrong.

In May 2006, The James Gang began a feud with Team 3D over which of them was the greatest tag team. The James Gang picked up a victory over Team 3D at Sacrifice after Kip used a pipe on Brother Devon. They met again at Slammiversary, with Team 3D picking up the win this time. With the teams standing at 1-1 (and Brother Runt returning to in-ring action), Team 3D challenged The James Gang to find themselves a partner and face them (Brother Runt included) in a six-man tag match at Victory Road. Whereas Team 3D expected them to get someone from their family (such as "Bullet" Bob Armstrong), the James Gang "made a deal with the devil" and paid James Mitchell to have Abyss team up with them instead. The James Gang and Abyss won the no-disqualification six-man tag match after Abyss Black Hole Slammed Brother Runt onto a table and got the pin.

==== Voodoo Kin Mafia (2006–2008) ====
On the November 2 edition of Impact!, Kip and B.G. James cut a worked-shoot promo announcing they were quitting the company out of frustration. During the promo B.G. claimed that TNA had mismanaged him during his run there, and as Kip attempted to speak into the microphone it was cut off. Attempts to use an announcers microphone and scream directly to the crowd were met with another microphone cutting and then the show abruptly going to commercial.

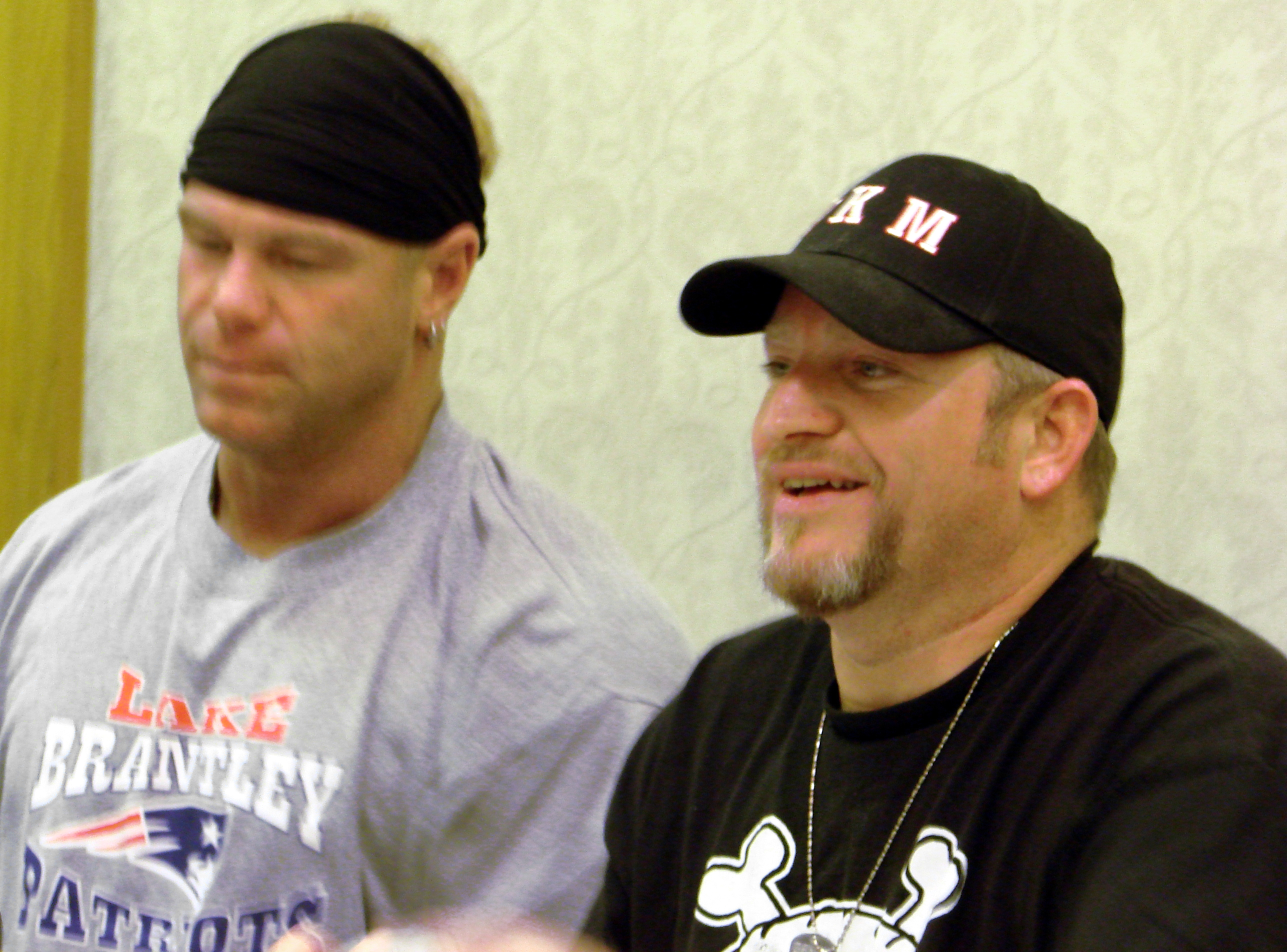
The Voodoo Kin Mafia (Kip, left, and B.G., right) at TNA Lockdown Interaction in 2007

After a November 11 house show in Connecticut (where World Wrestling Entertainment (WWE) is based) was canceled, TNA filmed a vignette at WWE headquarters featuring the James Gang discussing the show cancellation, posting it on their website two days later. This vignette was followed with a promo on the November 16 Impact!, during which they announced that they had been given "creative control", and were changing their name to the Voodoo Kin Mafia (VKM for short, a play on Vince McMahon's initials) and declaring "war" on WWE. During the "war" they called out the revived D-Generation X (DX), calling it a "failure" and stated that the original run was saved by their insertion as The New Age Outlaws in 1998. During their matches and promos on TNA television they continually included references to DX, including use of their signature taunts and maneuvers. Soon a series of vignettes began airing on Impact! with B.G. and Kip in and around Stamford, Connecticut, calling out Paul Levesque, Michael Hickenbottom, and Vince McMahon. During the vignettes they said they were trying to get a cease and desist letter signed and get WWE to stop using the DX name. The vignettes were notable for using the same style of humor as the original DX while running down the revived DX for doing the same thing.

When The Hardys reunited for December to Dismember and issued an open challenge the TNA website quickly posted a message from VKM accepting, though it had already been accepted by MNM. On December 1, VKM showed up at a WWE house show at the Knoxville Civic Center with Vince Russo, Jeremy Borash, and a camera crew. They interviewed fans outside, filmed themselves purchasing tickets and eventually entered the building, watching the main event match - featuring DX - from an upper-level seat. At December's Turning Point, they performed a parody of DX, then, in response to Jim Ross commenting on his website that Vince McMahon probably would not respond to the "war", and in response to their still receiving of legal warnings from WWE, they issued a "Million Dollar Challenge" to Vince McMahon and DX, offering to put up $1 million for a big fight between the DX members and themselves. Hermie Sadler of the UWF promotion later offered to host the "Million Dollar Challenge" at a UWF show during the weekend of WWE's Armageddon pay-per-view event (scheduled for December 17) citing that his event was close to Richmond, Virginia, the site of Armageddon. After the challenge was ignored, they narrowed it on the January 4 Impact!, challenging just Hickenbottom to meet them at the Alamo in his hometown of San Antonio the following Wednesday. VKM declared themselves victorious in their "war" during a promo at Final Resolution citing WWE's refusal to acknowledge their presence while fans loudly chanted both "TNA" and "VKM" during the January 8 episode of WWE Raw.

In the same promo, they entered an angle with Christy Hemme, who declared that women deserve respect in wrestling and found herself heavily disagreed with and mocked by Kip James, while B.G. attempted to agree with her. To shut VKM up, the evil Hemme brought in The Heartbreakers (Antonio Thomas and Romeo Roselli) in to TNA as mystery opponents at Destination X, but VKM made quick work of them. Around this time, Lance Hoyt began hanging around with VKM, keeping Christy Hemme out of VKM's matches. In April, at Lockdown, Hemme had Serotonin face VKM on the pre-show, but again VKM came out victorious. At Sacrifice 2007, VKM lost to Hemme's new team Damaja and Basham formerly known as The Basham Brothers in World Wrestling Entertainment, though not fairly, as Basham and Damaja injured (kayfabe) BG James before the match, making it a handicap match. VKM finally defeated Basham and Damaja at Slammiversary after Kip pinned Basham, but Lance Hoyt turned on VKM after the match. Weeks later, at the Victory Road pay-per-view, VKM debuted a new valet/accomplice, the so-called "Voodoo Queen" Roxxi Laveaux. She attacked Hemme after VKM's match.

On February 21, 2008, Kip turned on his partner by hitting him and his father with a crutch in a tag title match against A.J. Styles and Tomko, thus ending the team.

TNA creative writer Vince Russo stated that the Voodoo Kin Mafia ended when Triple H was injured, as there was nowhere else to go with the gimmick.

=== Return to WWE (2012–2015, 2018) ===
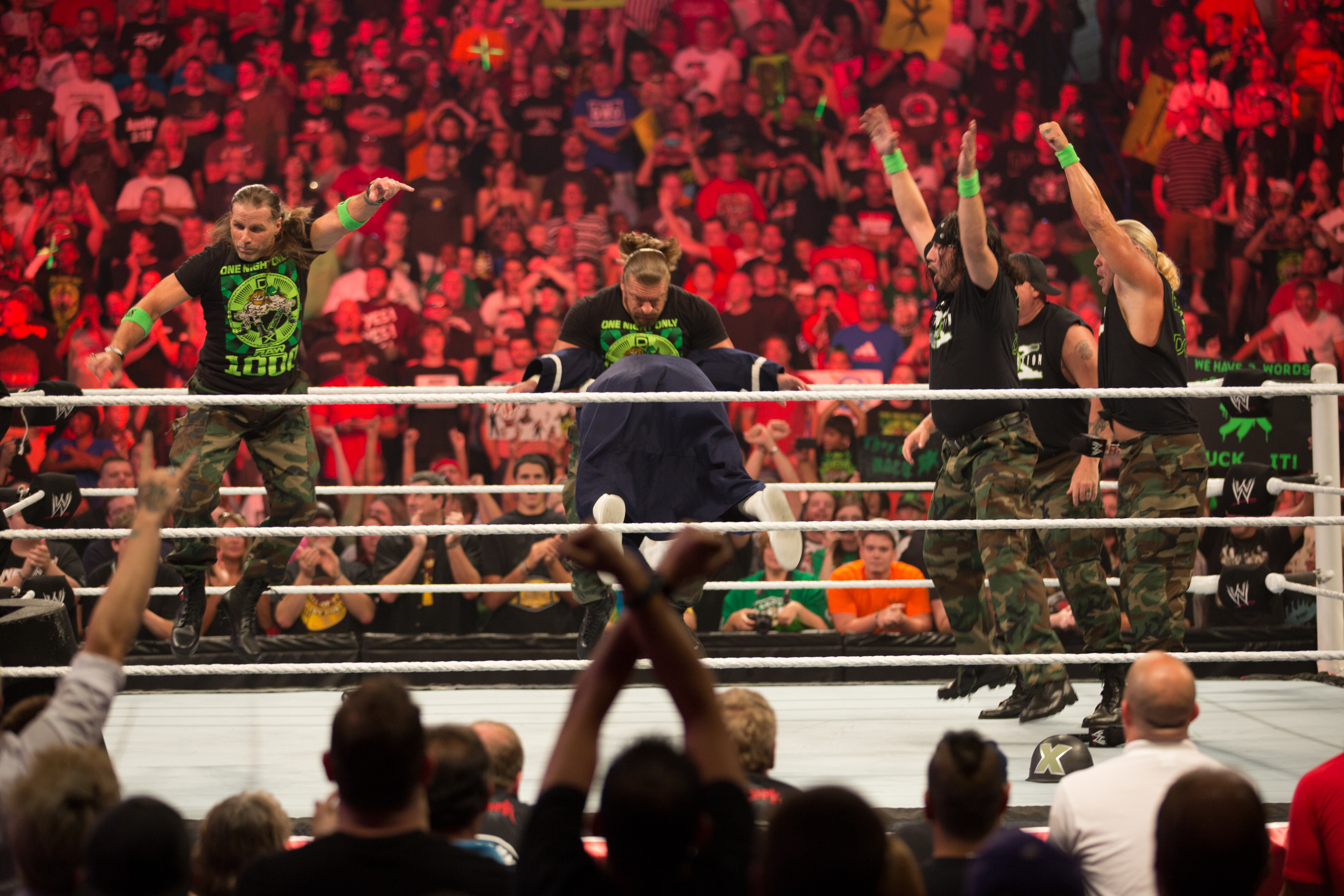
The Outlaws during the DX reunion at Raw 1000

On July 23, 2012, the New Age Outlaws returned to WWE on the 1000th episode of Raw to re-unite with X-Pac, Shawn Michaels and Triple H to reform D-Generation X for one night only. On December 17, Billy Gunn and Road Dogg appeared to present the Slammy Award to Jerry Lawler for Comeback of the Year. Starting on December 26 in Detroit at the Joe Louis Arena, the team reunited to face Team Rhodes Scholars in a house show loop.

On the March 4, 2013, episode of Old School Raw, the New Age Outlaws competed in their first televised tag team match in WWE since February 2000, where they defeated Primo and Epico. The following week on Raw, the New Age Outlaws answered a challenge to take on Rhodes Scholars, but during the match they were attacked by Brock Lesnar, who was in a feud with Triple H at the time.

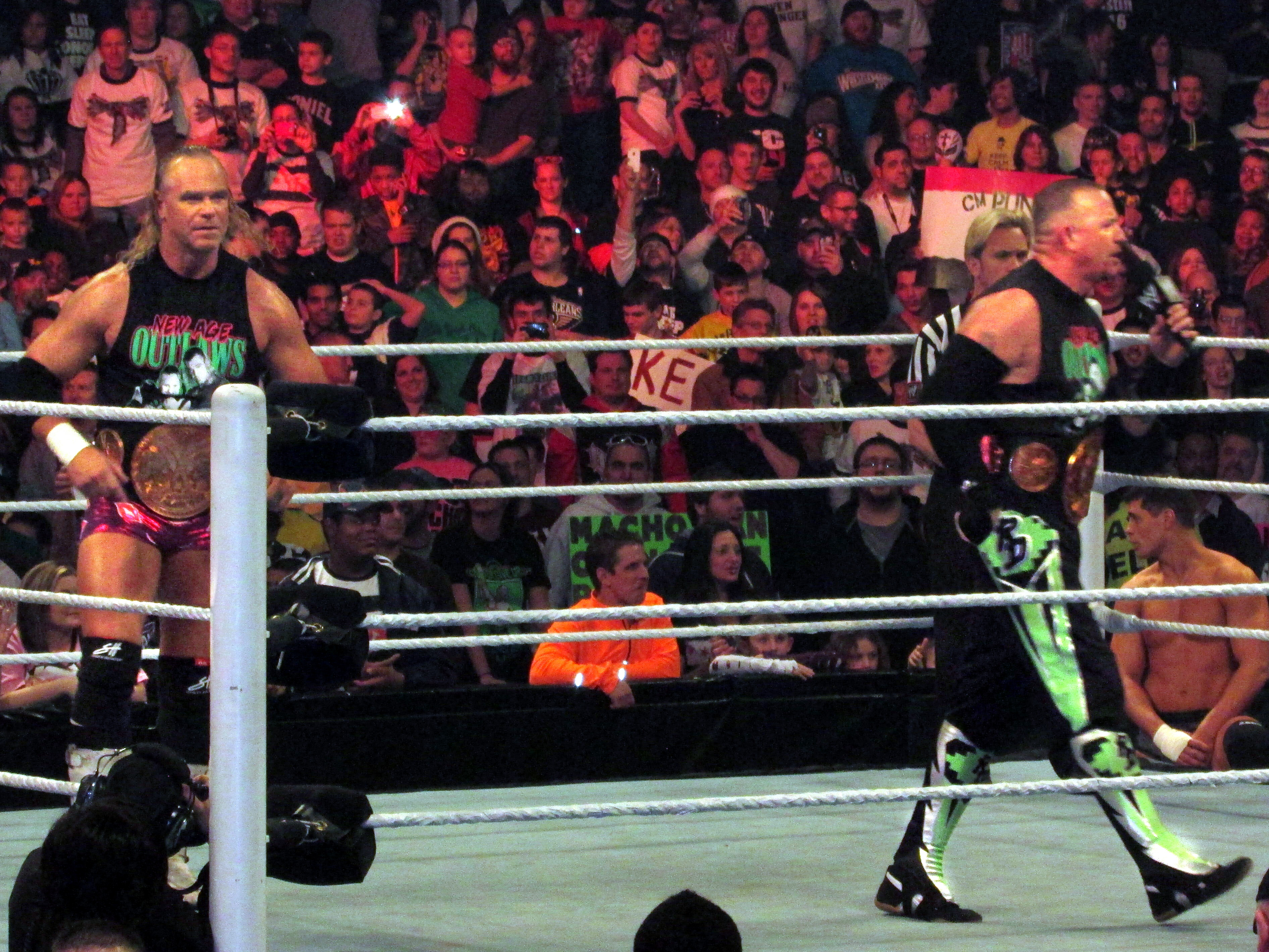
The New Age Outlaws as the WWE Tag Team Champions in January 2014

On the January 6, 2014, episode of Old School Raw, the Outlaws were in the corner of CM Punk during his match against Roman Reigns. On the January 10 episode of SmackDown, the Outlaws teamed with CM Punk in a six-man tag match against The Shield in a losing effort. On the January 13 episode of Raw, the Outlaws again teamed with Punk in a rematch against The Shield, only to abandon Punk and lose the match, thus turning heel in the process for the first time since 1999. Four days later on SmackDown, they defeated WWE Tag Team Champions Cody Rhodes and Goldust in a non-title match. At the Royal Rumble, the Outlaws defeated Rhodes and Goldust to become WWE Tag Team Champions, their first reign with these particular title, their sixth overall tag team championship reign in WWE and first in over 14 years, marking the longest time between reigns in WWE history. The following night on Raw, Rhodes and Goldust invoked their rematch clause, with the Outlaws retaining the title after losing by disqualification after Brock Lesnar interfered and attacked both Rhodes and Goldust. On the February 3 episode of Raw, Triple H granted Rhodes and Goldust a rematch for the titles in a steel cage match, in which the Outlaws would retain their title. At Elimination Chamber, the Outlaws successfully defended their titles against The Usos, but lost the championship in a rematch to The Usos on the March 3 episode of Raw. The New Age Outlaws, now billed as "The Corporate Outlaws", teamed with Kane to take on The Shield in a losing effort at WrestleMania XXX. Billy Gunn got injured on the night by a Triple Power Bomb that The Shield delivered to him. He developed hemoptysis and The New Age Outlaws did not appear on Raw and the following night on SmackDown.

On January 19, 2015, on Raw, they along with the APA and nWo, returned as faces and attacked The Ascension. This set up a match between the Outlaws and The Ascension at the Royal Rumble. They went on to lose to The Ascension after a Fall of Man on Gunn. At WrestleMania 31 The Outlaws, along with X-Pac and Shawn Michaels, assisted their DX partner Triple H in defeating Sting and also fought against the nWo, who had come to aid Sting.

On January 22, 2018, on the 25th anniversary of Raw, The New Age Outlaws got together with DX, and Scott Hall. During the segment, the historic stable established an alliance for one night only, with the Bálor Club. Later that evening, the Bálor Club defeated the Revival, and after the match the legends of the past performed on the latter, their classic finishers and signature taunts, with a Shake, Rattle and Roll from Road Dogg and a Famouser from Billy Gunn against Scott Dawson.

== Championships and accomplishments ==
- Freedom Pro Wrestling
  - FPW Tag Team Championship (1 time)
- Maryland Championship Wrestling
  - MCW Tag Team Championship (1 time)
- Pro Wrestling Illustrated
  - PWI ranked them #43 of the 100 best tag teams of the PWI Years in 2003
  - PWI Tag Team of the Year (1998)
- Total Nonstop Action Wrestling
  - Feast or Fired (2007 – World Tag Team Championship contract) – B.G. James
- TWA Powerhouse
  - TWA Tag Team Championship (1 time)
- World Wrestling Federation/WWE
  - WWE Tag Team Championship (1 time)
  - WWF Hardcore Championship (3 times) – Road Dogg (1) and Billy Gunn (2)
  - WWF Intercontinental Championship (2 times) – Road Dogg (1) and Billy Gunn (1)
  - WWF World Tag Team Championship (5 times)
  - WWE Hall of Fame (Class of 2019) – as members of D-Generation X
