= Vengeance (2005) =

World Wrestling Entertainment pay-per-view event

- Promotional poster featuring Batista and Triple H inside the Hell in a Cell structure
- Promotion: World Wrestling Entertainment
- Brand: Raw
- Date: June 26, 2005
- City: Paradise, Nevada
- Venue: Thomas & Mack Center
- Attendance: 9,850
- Buy rate: 420,000
- Tagline: Hell in a Cell

Pay-per-view chronology
← Previous; ECW One Night Stand	Next → The Great American Bash

Vengeance chronology
← Previous; 2004	Next → 2006

The 2005 Vengeance was a professional wrestling pay-per-view (PPV) event produced by World Wrestling Entertainment (WWE). It was the fifth annual Vengeance and took place on June 26, 2005, at the Thomas & Mack Center in Paradise, Nevada in the Las Vegas area, held exclusively for wrestlers from the promotion's Raw brand division.

The main event was a Hell in a Cell match for the World Heavyweight Championship between Batista and Triple H, which Batista won by pinfall after executing a Batista Bomb. One of the predominant matches on the card was John Cena versus Chris Jericho versus Christian in a Triple Threat match for the WWE Championship. Cena won the match and retained the title after pinning Christian. Another primary match on the undercard was Kurt Angle versus Shawn Michaels in a rematch of their bout at WrestleMania 21. Michaels won the match by pinfall after executing Sweet Chin Music.

Many of the existing feuds were settled following the event. Notably, Batista was drafted to the SmackDown! brand, thus ending his feud with Triple H. The feud between Kane and Edge also concluded after the event, as Edge entered an angle with Matt Hardy. The feud between Cena and Jericho, however, continued and led to a match at SummerSlam, which Cena won.

== Production ==
=== Background ===
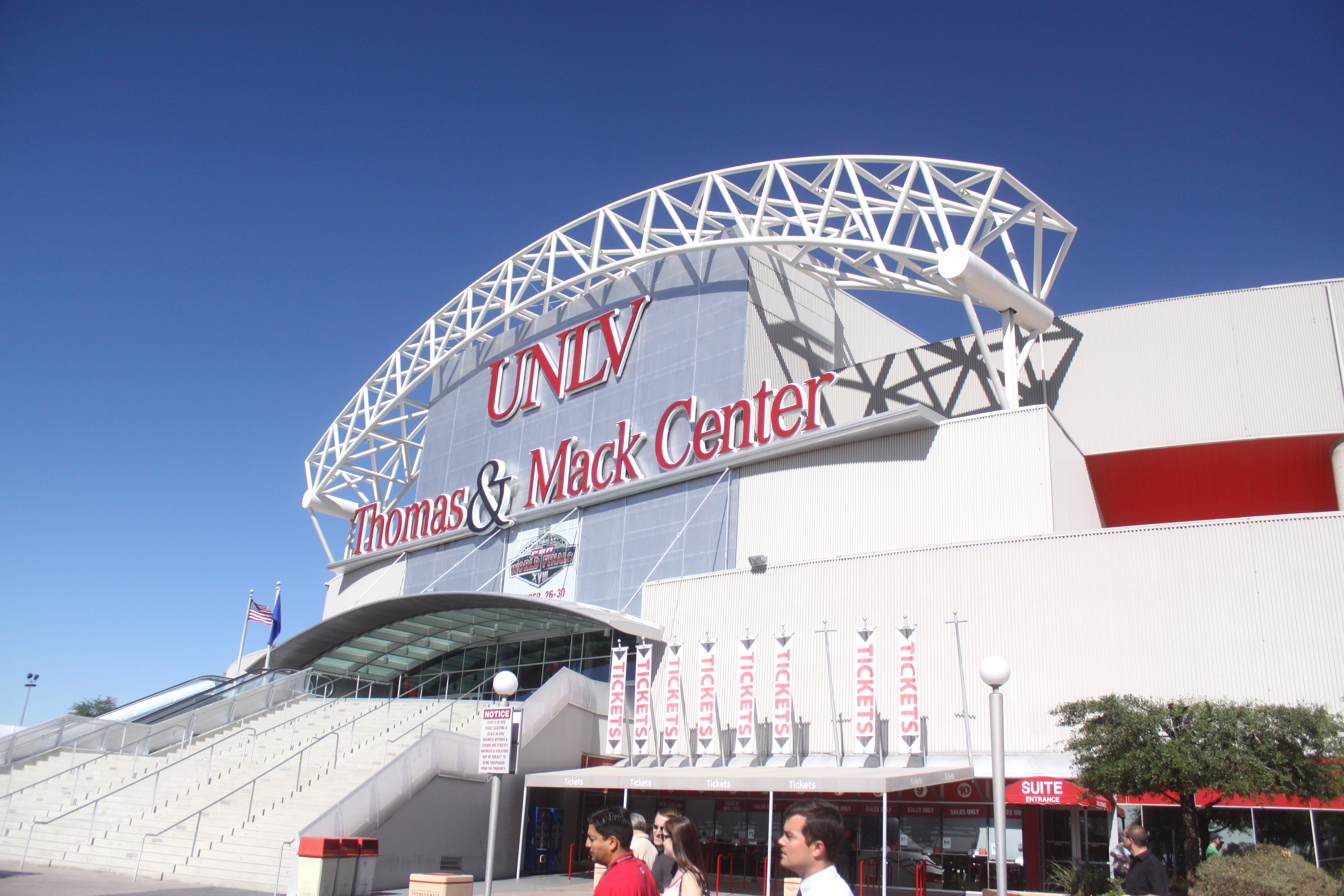
The fifth annual Vengeance took place at the Thomas & Mack Center in Paradise, Nevada in the Las Vegas area

Vengeance was an annual professional wrestling pay-per-view (PPV) event produced by World Wrestling Entertainment (WWE) since 2001. The first event was held in December before it moved up to July in 2002, establishing it as the annual July PPV. The fifth event, however, moved Vengeance up to June as it was held on June 26, 2005, at the Thomas & Mack Center in Paradise, Nevada in the Las Vegas area. Like the 2004 event, the 2005 event was held exclusively for wrestlers from the Raw brand.

=== Storylines ===
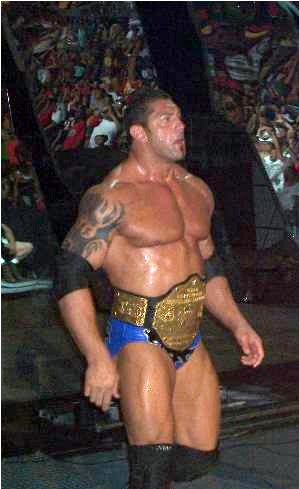
Batista as World Heavyweight Champion

The event featured six professional wrestling matches that resulted from scripted storylines. Results were predetermined by WWE's writers on the Raw brand, while storylines were produced on WWE's weekly television show, Monday Night Raw.

The main feud heading into Vengeance was between Batista and Triple H, with the two battling over the World Heavyweight Championship. After Batista defeated Triple H at WrestleMania 21, they continued to fight over the World Heavyweight Championship at Backlash, which saw Batista retain the title. Following Backlash, a series of Gold Rush Tournament matches to determine a number one contender to face Batista for the World Heavyweight Championship took place with Kane, Shawn Michaels, Edge, and Chris Benoit winning in the first round of the tournament. In this round, Benoit forced Triple H to submit to the Sharpshooter, Benoit's submission finisher. On the May 23 episode of Raw, Batista faced Edge, who had won the tournament to become the number one contender for the World Heavyweight Championship. Batista retained the title after he pinned Edge following a Batista Bomb. Following the match, Triple H attacked Batista with a sledgehammer and challenged him to a Hell in a Cell match. After making the challenge, Triple H performed a Pedigree to Batista on the World title. Batista accepted Triple H's challenge, which led to a contract signing for their scheduled match at Vengeance, which would be for the World Heavyweight Championship in a Hell in a Cell match.

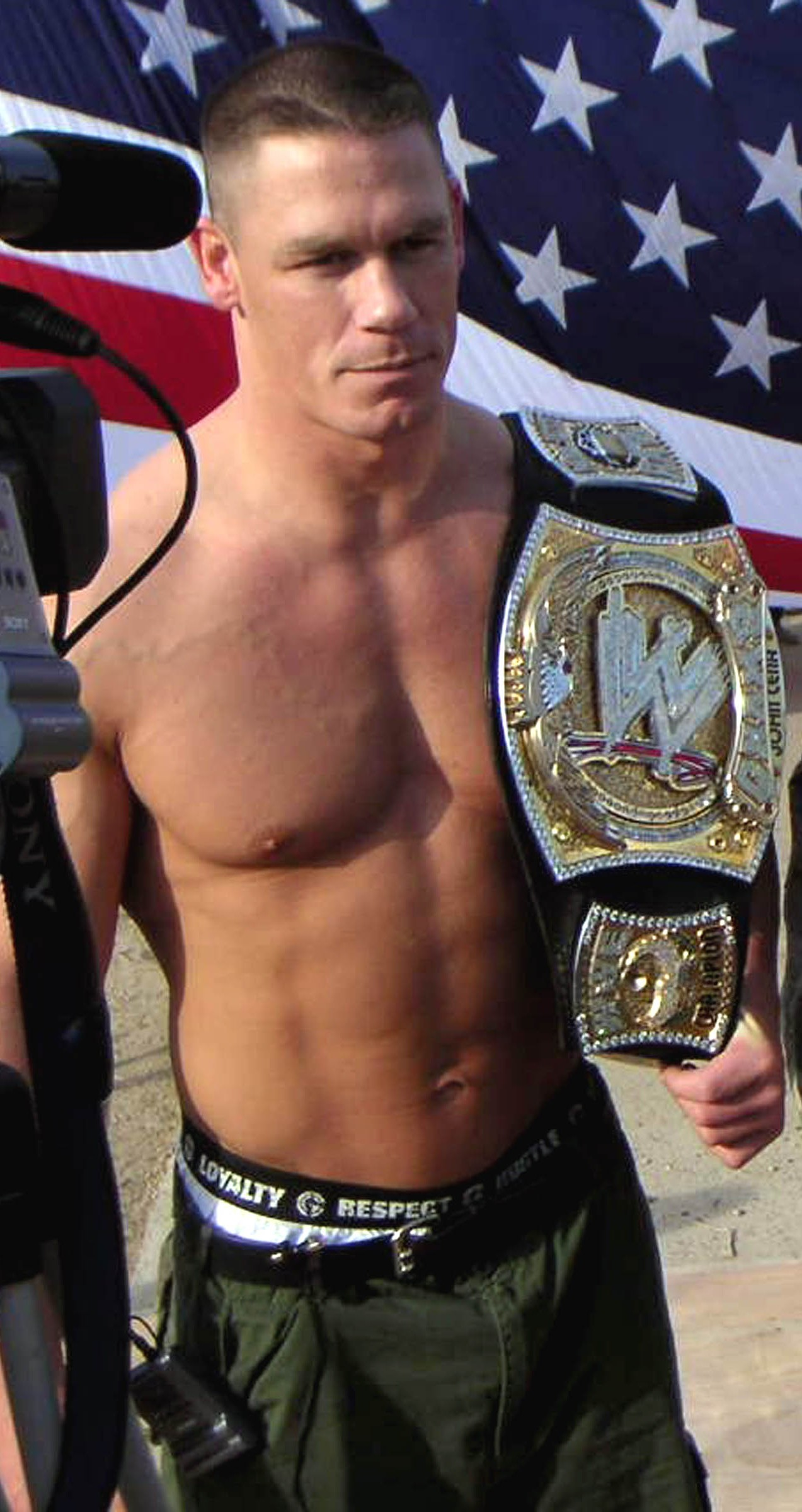
John Cena as WWE Champion

The other main feud heading into the event was between John Cena, Chris Jericho, and Christian, with the three battling over the WWE Championship. On the June 6 episode of Raw, John Cena's SmackDown! tenure came to an end when he became the first wrestler selected by the Raw brand General Manager, Eric Bischoff, in the draft lottery. Cena was introduced as Raw's newest member in Chris Jericho's segment, the Highlight Reel, but Christian interrupted and called Cena a poser. This built on their existing rivalry, as Cena and Christian had an encounter at the Royal Rumble, in which Christian claimed that he was a better rapper than Cena. At the time, Cena was a member of the SmackDown! brand and Christian was part of the Raw brand. Over the next months, Christian began cutting promos denouncing Cena as a 'poser'. Cena rebutted Christian's comments by performing a freestyle rap about Christian, which quickly led to the two brawling in the ring. The same evening, Cena entered a feud with Bischoff by refusing to participate in Bischoff's "war" against the upcoming Extreme Championship Wrestling (ECW) reunion show. On the June 13 episode of Raw, Bischoff booked a WWE Championship match between Christian and Cena at Vengeance, although Jericho protested the idea of Christian being the contender to face Cena for the title. Later that night, Cena and Jericho were placed in a tag team match and faced off against Christian and Tyson Tomko. Cena and Jericho won the match after Cena got the pinfall. After the match, Jericho turned on Cena and attacked him. Bischoff then changed the original match between Cena and Christian to a triple threat match at Vengeance that also included Jericho.

One of the main matches on the undercard was between Kurt Angle and Shawn Michaels. At the start of the year, Angle and Michaels both participated in the Royal Rumble match at the 2005 Royal Rumble pay-per-view event. During the match, Michaels eliminated Angle. In retaliation, Angle returned to the match and eliminated Michaels and then attacked him outside the ring. The two engaged in a feud, which led to an Interpromotional match at WrestleMania 21, as Angle was part of the SmackDown! roster and Michaels belonged to the Raw roster. At WrestleMania 21, Angle got the win over Michaels by forcing him to submit to the Ankle Lock. On the June 13 episode of Raw, Angle was revealed to be the second draft pick for the Raw brand. That same evening, Michaels challenged Angle to a rematch at Vengeance, which Angle accepted.

The Divas match set for Vengeance was between Victoria and Christy Hemme. On the May 30 edition of Raw, Christy Hemme won a bikini contest; defeating Victoria, Candice Michelle, Maria, and Lilian Garcia. After the contest ended, Victoria turned heel and attacked all of the participants, saving Hemme for last. In a backstage interview following, the evil Victoria expressed jealousy of Hemme, stating that she was tired of Hemme getting all of the attention. On the June 20 episode of Raw, it was announced in a backstage interview that Hemme and Victoria would face each other at Vengeance. Hemme stated that she couldn't wait to get her hands on Victoria, but during the segment, Victoria interrupted the interview by smashing a glass jar on the back of Hemme's head.

== Event ==
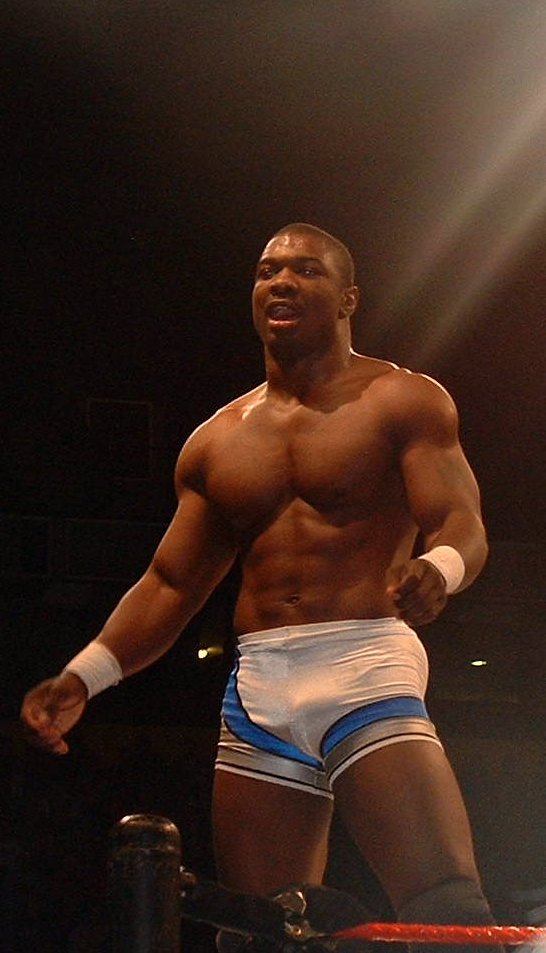
Shelton Benjamin faced Carlito for the Intercontinental Championship

Other on-screen personnel
Role:	Name:
English commentators	Jim Ross
English commentators	Jerry Lawler
Spanish commentators	Carlos Cabrera
Spanish commentators	Hugo Savinovich
Interviewers	Jonathan Coachman
Interviewers	Todd Grisham
Ring announcer	Justin Roberts
Referees	Mike Chioda
Referees	Chad Patton
Referees	Earl Hebner
Referees	Jack Doan

=== Sunday Night Heat matches ===
Before the event went live on pay-per-view, Rosey and The Hurricane (with Super Stacy) defeated The Heart Throbs (Antonio and Romeo) to retain the World Tag Team Championship in a match taped for Sunday Night Heat.

=== Preliminary matches ===
The first match that aired was between Carlito and Shelton Benjamin for the Intercontinental Championship. After back and forth action, Carlito removed the padding from one of the turnbuckles. Benjamin then hit his head on the exposed metal while performing a Stinger splash. Carlito pinned Benjamin with a roll-up, allowing Carlito to retain the Intercontinental Championship.

Next was a match between Victoria and Christy Hemme. The match saw Victoria lift Hemme in the air and drop her down with force. Control of the match went back and forth, but the bout came to an end when Victoria countered Hemme's sunset flip. Victoria got the pinfall by using the ring ropes for leverage.

The third match of the night saw Kane face Edge, during which both men took the upper hand. Snitsky interfered in the match, delivering a big boot to Kane. Moments later, Snitsky was quickly taken out by Edge after he accidentally hit him with his Money in the Bank briefcase. Kane performed a chokeslam and pinned Edge for the win.

=== Main event matches ===
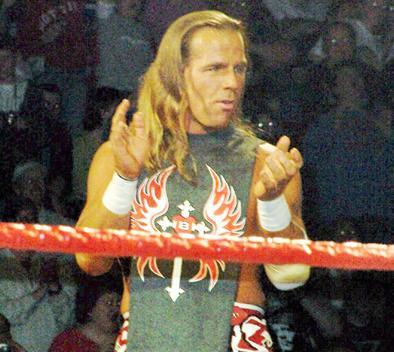
Shawn Michaels, who defeated Kurt Angle in a WrestleMania 21 rematch

This bout was followed by a WrestleMania 21 rematch that involved Shawn Michaels and Kurt Angle. In a brawling match, Angle had an Ankle Lock applied on Michaels. Moments later, however, Michaels recuperated and performed Sweet Chin Music on Angle before pinning Angle for the win. After the match, both men were given a standing ovation. An in-ring segment took place next between Raw's ring announcer, Lilian Garcia and Viscera. During the segment, Garcia proposed to Viscera. Before Viscera could have given an answer, he was interrupted by The Godfather. The Godfather gave Viscera advice about the life he would miss out on if he got married. This led to Viscera rejecting Garcia's marriage proposal and leaving the ring with the Godfather's hos and abandoning a crying Garcia in the ring.

The fifth match was a triple threat match for the WWE Championship between champion John Cena, Christian, and Chris Jericho. The match saw all three wrestlers take the advantage over one another. A spot in the match included Jericho applying the Walls of Jericho on Cena, but he released the move and performed a springboard dropkick on Christian, after Christian got up on the ring apron. Late in the match, Jericho reversed an Unprettier attempt by Christian by tossing Christian directly to Cena. Cena performed an FU on Christian and pinned Christian to retain the WWE title.

The main event was a Hell in a Cell match between Batista and Triple H for the World Heavyweight Championship. During the match, Triple H choked Batista with a chain and repeatedly hit him in the back with a steel chair wrapped with barbed wire. Batista regained the momentum by grabbing Triple H's sledgehammer and hitting him with it. Batista performed a spinebuster onto the steel steps on Triple H, which was followed with a Batista Bomb for the win to retain the title. After the match, Triple H was given a standing ovation by the audience.

== Aftermath ==
Immediately after their Hell in a Cell match as an exclusive to WWE Home Video, Triple H (with Ric Flair) and Batista encountered backstage to put their differences aside and embraced with Triple H quipping "This is Evolution, baby", referring to their past as a stable, which had disbanded until 2014.

In June 2005, the 2005 WWE Draft Lottery took place, in which wrestlers were drafted and traded between the Raw and SmackDown! brands. On the June 30 episode of SmackDown!, Batista's tenure on the Raw brand ended, when he was SmackDown!'s final pick in the draft lottery. SmackDown! General Manager Theodore Long scheduled a six-man elimination match between John "Bradshaw" Layfield (JBL), The Undertaker, Muhammad Hassan, Chris Benoit, Booker T and Christian, in which the winner would receive the SmackDown! Championship, as the WWE Championship had been moved to the Raw brand. JBL won the match, but Teddy Long informed JBL that he did not win the SmackDown! championship. As the winner of the match, however, he would face Batista for the World Heavyweight Championship. On the July 7 episode of SmackDown!, it was revealed that the match between JBL and Batista would take place at The Great American Bash. At The Great American Bash, Batista was disqualified for attacking JBL with a chair. JBL won the match, but did not win the title because titles cannot change hands by countout or disqualification unless otherwise stipulated.

Following Vengeance, Eric Bischoff vowed to make John Cena's stint on Raw difficult. He "hand-picked" Chris Jericho to take the WWE title off Cena by booking a match between Cena and Jericho at SummerSlam. During their feud, even though Cena was portrayed as the face and Jericho as the heel, a vocal section of live crowds nonetheless chose to boo Cena during their matches, including at SummerSlam where Cena retained the title after executing an FU.

After a successful tag team win at Backlash, in which Shawn Michaels and Hulk Hogan defeated Muhammad Hassan and Daivari. Michaels and Hogan were placed in tag team match against Kurt Angle and Carlito on the July 4 episode of Raw. The match saw Hogan and Michaels get the victory. During the post-match pose, Michaels superkicked Hogan, which knocked Hogan to the ground and turning Michaels heel for the first time since returning to the company in 2002. The following week, Michaels challenged Hogan to a match at SummerSlam, which Hogan accepted. In this match, Hogan maintained his perfect record at SummerSlam by defeating Michaels.

The feud between Edge and Kane came to an end when Edge was put in an angle with Matt Hardy. On the July 11 episode of Raw, Hardy, who at the time was unemployed by WWE, made a surprise appearance, interfering in a match between Edge and Kane. The following week, as both Edge and Lita were walking towards the ring before a scheduled Steel cage match against Kane, Hardy attacked Edge from behind. On the August 1 episode of Raw, Vince McMahon officially announced Hardy's return to WWE, adding that Hardy would face Edge at SummerSlam. The following week, Hardy made his in-ring return, defeating Snitsky. After the victory, Hardy was attacked by Edge, and was carried backstage. In retaliation, Hardy counterattacked Edge in the locker room. At SummerSlam, Edge was given the win in the match after Hardy hit the ring post and began to bleed profusely, which caused the referee to stop the match.

After a three-month hiatus, Triple H returned on the WWE Homecoming episode of Raw on October 3. He took part in a match, teaming up with Ric Flair, who was wrestling as a face, to take on Chris Masters and Carlito. The duo defeated Masters and Carlito; after the match, Triple H turned on Flair and hit him with a sledgehammer marked the end of Evolution after more than two years since 2003. This led to an angle between Triple H and Flair. At Taboo Tuesday, Triple H and Flair met in a Steel Cage match, a stipulation chosen by the fans, for the Intercontinental Championship. The match saw Flair retain the Intercontinental Championship, after escaping through the cage door.

== Results ==
No.	Results	Stipulations	Times
1^{H}	The Hurricane and Rosey (c) (with Super Stacy) defeated The Heart Throbs (Antonio and Romeo) by pinfall	Tag team match for the World Tag Team Championship	5:06
2	Carlito (c) defeated Shelton Benjamin by pinfall	Singles match for the WWE Intercontinental Championship	12:50
3	Victoria defeated Christy Hemme by pinfall	Singles match	5:06
4	Kane defeated Edge (with Lita) by pinfall	Singles match	11:12
5	Shawn Michaels defeated Kurt Angle by pinfall	Singles match	26:12
6	John Cena (c) defeated Chris Jericho and Christian by pinfall	Triple threat match for the WWE Championship	15:18
7	Batista (c) defeated Triple H by pinfall	Hell in a Cell match for the World Heavyweight Championship	26:54
(c) / – the champion(s) heading into the match; H / – the match was broadcast prior to the pay-per-view on Sunday Night Heat
