= Heat (professional wrestling) =

Professional wrestling term

In professional wrestling, heat can refer to both crowd reactions and real-life animosity between those involved in a professional wrestling angle, or match.

In terms of crowd reaction, heat is usually used to denote how much of a reaction a heel wrestler receives, but can also be used for a babyface. Although the term can in some contexts refer to either positive or negative crowd reactions, heat is usually used specifically to mean a negative crowd response (e.g. booing), with its opposite being a "pop" or positive reaction (cheering, clapping, etc.).

As heat typically refers to a negative reaction that a wrestling character gets from a crowd in a performance setting, it has also become slang for a negative reaction that a wrestler gets backstage from colleagues, management or both. Backstage heat can be garnered for both real and perceived slights and transgressions.

== Cheap ==
Heels can draw "cheap heat" (called "cheap" because it is an easy way for the villains to receive boos) by blatantly insulting the fans, a local sports team, or the town in which they are performing. Fan favorites would sometimes do the equivalent, referred to as a "cheap pop", by referring to the town (which Mick Foley popularized) or promising to "win one for the fans". The villains can also draw cheap heat by referring to a mainstream news event as part of their promo, especially if the event has strongly emotional or political ramifications (e.g. a natural disaster), although they sometimes do not mention it by name. Historically, another common practice of villains to draw cheap heat involves using racial and ethnic slurs to offend the collective sensibility of wrestling fans. For example, in 1972, when the American Indian Movement was gaining momentum, Baron von Raschke was known to refer to Native American WWA World Heavyweight Champion Billy Red Cloud as a "dirty low down Injun" as a means of drawing cheap heat.

Another example of a wrestler using cheap heat was Sgt. Slaughter, who often delivered anti-American promos during the Gulf War (and Operation Desert Shield immediately before it) as part of his Iraqi sympathizer gimmick; one of those promos came at the 1990 Survivor Series, where Slaughter insulted servicemen stationed in Iraq for Thanksgiving. In 2003, The Rock used the Lakers-Kings rivalry to gain cheap heat during a WWE Raw show in Sacramento (The Rock even claimed that he was friends with Laker star Shaquille O'Neal) when he was singing a song about leaving the city; the song's last lyrics were: "I'll be sure to come back when the Lakers beat the Kings in May." In 2004 during a WWE live event in Germany, John Bradshaw Layfield used Nazi salutes and was booed heavily by the crowd. In April 2006 during his feud with Shawn Michaels, Mr. McMahon used religion and the city to get heat from the crowd in St. Louis, Missouri by saying he went to hell that morning when his driver "got lost and ended up in East St. Louis".

Other examples include CM Punk and Paul Heyman in March 2013 mocking through displays of flippancy and disrespect towards Paul Bearer (who had just died), stealing his trademark urn and with Punk going as far as assaulting The Undertaker and constantly beating him with the urn (with Heyman being dressed up as Bearer) before then boldly opening the urn and emptying its contents over a fallen Undertaker. In November 2015, Paige mocked then Divas Champion Charlotte about her late younger brother Reid.

In October 2018 at the Key Arena in Seattle, Kevin Owens and Elias received over six minutes of continuous booing after mocking the city's loss of the SuperSonics basketball team to Oklahoma City.

== Canned ==
"Canned heat" refers to playing a recording of cheering or booing through the arena sound system or adding it to a taped show, to either amplify a crowd reaction or mask silence from the crowd. Pre-taped crowd reactions from other events are also spliced in with the programming to make the crowd look more energetic than it actually is, or if promoters want a storyline to go in a particular direction.

For example, in early 1992 the World Wrestling Federation was attempting to push Sid Justice as a villain. During the Royal Rumble match in January, Justice – who had become popular due to his charisma – was loudly cheered when he eliminated Hulk Hogan, and commentators Bobby "The Brain" Heenan and Gorilla Monsoon picked up on this as a fair act. However, the reaction was edited in future television replays, with Sid being booed heavily and Monsoon describing him as a "jerk".

Before SmackDown went live in 2016, WWE usually overdubbed cheers on it and professional wrestling magazine Power Slam joked that the company has had to "fire up the Fake Crowd Roar Machine™ to add an artificial atmosphere". This was particularly done for Roman Reigns, who was heavily booed at the time despite being booked as a babyface.

Gillberg's entrance mocked on this concept, which features pre-recorded "Gillberg" chants in reference to accusations of World Championship Wrestling using pre-recorded crowd chants in entrances of the wrestler Gillberg parodies, Bill Goldberg.

This concept would end up being used outside of professional wrestling such as the National Hockey League during the 2020 Stanley Cup playoffs as the COVID-19 pandemic hit United States and Canada that impacted the sporting world. The crowd noise was provided by Electronic Arts, combined with recordings of team-specific chants by season ticketholders of participating teams in bubble cities in Edmonton and Toronto (the latter of which was also played in-arena). Similarly, in the National Football League, Fox lead commentator Joe Buck in an interview with Andy Cohen stated that the network had not ruled out the possibility of using artificial crowd noise on its telecasts for the 2020 season to make up for the possibility of limited or no attendance at games, and that Fox was also exploring the possibility of masking empty stands with CGI crowds. WWE would later follow up on the concept by installing LED boards on Amway Center and later Tropicana Field, branded as WWE ThunderDome on-screen and mixing arena's audio with that of the virtual fans when the promotion began moving tapings from the WWE Performance Center in August 2020.

== Go home ==
"Go home heat" (sometimes called "go away heat" or "nuclear heat") occurs when fans boo or jeer a legitimately disliked character or, sometimes, the wrestler playing that character. Go home heat can be given to wrestlers who are viewed negatively, either for their booking, their character, or even their actions outside of the show; thus, both heroes and villains can get this kind of heat. However, nuclear heat can also mean a heel character getting genuine disdain from fans, simply from great character work. This is much less common in the present day, as fans may be more clued in to the inner workings of professional wrestling, and this type of heat is transformed into a pop. This is due to smarks realizing how good the character work is, and cheering instead of booing.

Generally speaking, go home heat happens either because the fans feel the promotion has been too aggressively pushing a certain wrestler (regardless of his character alignment) who they feel is undeserving of their push, or because the character has become stale, boring, and uninteresting. While it can be difficult to distinguish the good heat for the villain from go away heat, with some fans and critics claiming it is indeed go away heat and others claiming it is good heat, there are a few example which are closer to be go away heat, most notably in WWE because of its major exposure. Notorious examples of the concept are The Rock as Rocky Maivia, X-Pac (who popularized the term in the early 2000s so much that go away heat is also known as "X-Pac heat"), Triple H, John "Bradshaw" Layfield, Lita, Stephanie McMahon, Michael Cole in 2011, and more recently Death Riders, Roman Reigns (see Public image of Roman Reigns), Baron Corbin, Mercedes Moné, Jon Moxley, Young Bucks, Daniel Garcia, Wheeler Yuta, Gable Steveson, Nia Jax, Logan Paul, Karrion Kross, Austin Theory, and Charlotte Flair.

=== Rocky Maivia ===
Between 1996 and 1997, Rocky Maivia was the first major example of go away heat and also the best example of turning the go away heat into a star by 1998. Hyped as the WWF's first third-generation wrestler, Maivia was a clean-cut heroic character who was pushed heavily from the start and won the Intercontinental Championship despite his wrestling inexperience. This was during a transitional, but more edgy period that would lead to the Attitude Era, therefore audiences became increasingly hostile toward Maivia, with chants of "Die, Rocky, die!" and "Rocky sucks!" being heard during his matches. After suffering a legit injury in April 1997, Maivia would return as a villain character in August 1997 by joining the Nation of Domination and refusing to acknowledge the Rocky Maivia name, instead referring to himself in the third person as The Rock, insulting the audience in his promos as well as WWF television interviewers. The Rock would eventually become the Nation's leader and draw good heat, then starting getting cheered while still being a villain before being officially turned back into a fan favorite character by September 1998. During his time in the Nation, The Rock would get back the Intercontinental Championship and held it for 265 days (the second longest in the 1990s and the longest until Gunther in 2022), with his second reign being better reviewed and the ladder match in which he lost the title to Triple H at SummerSlam being rated 4.25 out of five stars by journalist Dave Meltzer of Wrestling Observer Newsletter (WON).

Despite now getting the desired reaction, the WWF would turn him back into a villain (from November 1998 to April 1999) to feud with Mankind (Mick Foley) and become the top villain to main event WrestleMania XV as WWF Champion and drop the title to the company's "poster boy" Stone Cold Steve Austin. In April 1999, The Rock would turn back into a heroic character and would become one of the most successful characters of both the Attitude Era and WWE history. Despite getting some mixed reactions in 2001 and 2002, most notably against Austin in the main event of WrestleMania X-Seven at Austin's home state, "Hollywood" Hulk Hogan at WrestleMania X8 and Brock Lesnar at SummerSlam, The Rock would never draw go away heat and would instead use both the fans turning on him and him getting more successful in his actor career to turn back into a villain in 2003 to end his full-time career, before becoming once again a fan favorite ever since 2004.

=== X-Pac ===
During the Invasion storyline, where the WWF side (to which X-Pac belonged) was mostly portrayed as the heroes, the fans were vocal in their disapproval of X-Pac, which was acknowledged on-screen by both Alliance member Billy Kidman and later by WWF member Edge. This mass disapproval led to the term "X-Pac heat" as described above.

=== Triple H ===
Between 1999 and 2001, Triple H had a successful run as the main villain of the WWF—especially in 2000, when he became the first villain to win the main event of WrestleMania and thus retain the WWF Championship, as well as winning the "Feud of the Year" award by both PWI (with Kurt Angle) and WON (with Mick Foley) and the WON "Wrestler of the Year" award due his accomplishments and performances. Dave Meltzer would rank Triple H's drawing power as the number one of the 2000s.

However, by late 2002 he would be criticized for the Katie Vick angle with Kane, with his following feuds with Scott Steiner and Booker T being criticized as well. Thus his "reign of terror" with the World Heavyweight Championship (he was the inaugural holder, being awarded the title by Raw General Manager Eric Bischoff in September 2002) by December 2002 to September 2003 would often being described as go away heat due to his mediocre angles and matches.

As result of his go away heat, between 2002 and 2004 Triple H would win the "Worst Feud of the Year" with Kane (including the "Most Disgusting Promotional Tactic"), as well as the "Worst Worked Match of the Year" (with Scott Steiner in January 2003) and being voted by WON's readers as the "Most Overrated" (2002–2004) and the "Readers' Least Favorite Wrestler" (2002 and 2003). It would stay with him despite getting in a better physical condition and thus having better matches and feuds by 2004—due to him winning the title five times for a total of 616 days—until he put over Batista (whose storyline building and eventual feud was highly acclaimed, winning the WON "Feud of the Year" award) at WrestleMania 21, Backlash and Vengeance. After his Hell in a Cell match with Batista at Vengeance, Triple H was given a standing ovation. Triple H would be getting cheered during his feud with Cena in 2006 despite still being a villain, which would lead to his return as a fan favorite.

=== John Bradshaw Layfield ===
John Bradshaw Layfield's push in 2004 that would change him from a predominantly tag team division competitor to a SmackDown! main eventer who went on to hold the WWE Championship for 280 days (the longest reign in a decade) is often seen as go away heat due to the push being perceived as forced and undeserving. It was noted that Layfield's push came at a time when SmackDown!'s talent roster was short of heel main eventers due to Brock Lesnar leaving the company and Kurt Angle due once again suffering from legitimate neck problems. It came to light that then-reigning WWE Champion and top babyface Eddie Guerrero felt a lot of pressure as he felt he was responsible for the drop in crowd attendance at SmackDown!'s live events at the time and wanted to drop the title. Layfield would not improve things on SmackDown! during his reign and actually drew even less than Guerrero. Furthermore, Layfield's matches on pay-per-view were not well received, including his WrestleMania 21 match with John Cena in which he lost the title. However, the subsequent rematch between Layfield and Cena in an "I Quit" match at Judgment Day was better received.

=== Stephanie McMahon ===
As a villainess, Stephanie McMahon has been able to draw many boos, but her run with The Authority since 2013, as well as her run as Raw Commissioner, has been criticized and critics and fans alike saw her heat during this period as go away heat.

=== Hulk Hogan ===
Hulk Hogan, the face of the WWF that would lead to a boom in professional wrestling during the 1980s, may be included as well due to receiving less positive reactions by the early 1990s, including the Sid incident at the 1992 Royal Rumble, and even getting some boos, especially in his early years with World Championship Wrestling (WCW). This was mostly due to a stale character, which was turned as a villain in July 1996, becoming the leader of the New World Order (nWo) and eventually turning back into a fan favorite in 1999. During the live debut of Monday Night Raw on Netflix on January 6, 2025, Hogan was booed loudly by the audience when he came out to cut a promo for Real American Beer. Many commentators saw this as a culmination of years worth of fan frustration stemming from shoot interviews by other wrestlers speaking about Hogan, his political positions, and his own personal scandals.

=== John Cena ===
Curiously, the last two WWE wrestlers billed as "the face of the company" or "the top guy" (John Cena and Roman Reigns) have been linked to have had go away heat, as both have in common the fact to be billed as heroic characters and staying as such despite getting jeers for years, unlike Rocky Maivia who was turned into a villain less than a year after his failed run as fan favorite. Cena had a brief run as a villain between late 2002 and late 2003, when he was turned back into a fan favorite to acclaim, much like The Rock in 1998. Cena would also win his first world title to a pop from the crowd, eventually surpassing Batista's popularity in 2005 that would see him being moved from SmackDown to the Raw brand. By mid-2005, a change of character not appreciated by fans would see Cena changing from "The Doctor of Thuganomics" (a rapper) to a more clean-cut character (described by Cena as a "goody-two shoes Superman") who would often "overcome the odds", thus getting his first boos and jeers. In the following years, Cena would get mostly real "mixed reaction" rather than go away heat, oftentimes still getting more cheers than boos, with the notorious exception of Rob Van Dam's Money in the Bank cash-in at ECW's One Night Stand (with ECW being Van Dam's "home promotion"), Tables, Ladders and Chairs match against Edge at Unforgiven in Edge's hometown and against CM Punk at Money in the Bank in CM Punk's hometown. Eventually, by the 2010s he would be reevaluated (ironically, also due Reigns being described as "even worse") and getting more cheers, especially during his run as United States Champion in 2015 and even when winning his 16th world championship against popular and respected veteran AJ Styles at the Royal Rumble in January 2017.

=== Roman Reigns ===
Reigns, while actually debuting on WWE's main roster as a villain in November 2012, would never actually have a villain single run due to debuting as part of The Shield. By late 2013, Reigns would be getting the biggest push between the three members of The Shield (Dean Ambrose and Seth Rollins), as he got to win as sole survivor his Survivor Series 5-on-5 Survivor Series match and the most elimination at 4, being the only member of The Shield to defeat CM Punk and breaking another record at the Royal Rumble for the most eliminations in a single Royal Rumble match at 12, also eliminating both Ambrose and Rollins from the match and ending up being the runner-up (Reigns would get cheered over eventual winner Batista, as fans wanted fan favorite and popular Daniel Bryan to win instead of Batista), being eventually billed as the leader of The Shield during their feud with Evolution (Batista, Randy Orton and Triple H) between April and May 2014. After The Shield broke up in June 2014, the heroic Ambrose and the now villain Rollins would change their ring attire and theme music (unlike Reigns, who retained much of The Shield's aesthetic including ring attire, a remixed version of the group's theme music and ring entrance), eventually evolving their characters during their high acclaimed feud that won the Pro Wrestling Illustrated (PWI) award for the "Feud of the Year". While Ambrose was being voted by PWI's reader as the "Most Popular Wrestler of the Year" in 2014 and 2015 and Rollins as both the "Wrestler of the Year" and the "Most Hated Wrestler of the Year" in 2015, Reigns had finished in second place for the WON "Most Overrated" award in both 2014 and 2015. When breaking up The Shield, WWE thought Reigns was the most popular between the three and thus pushed Reigns in the main event, immediately going after the world title. However, as soon as his singles career on WWE's main roster started, Reigns' positive reactions started to diminish, culminating in Orton getting cheered over him during their match at SummerSlam. After suffering a legit incarcerated hernia in September 2014, Reigns' positive crowd reactions following his return in December further diminished, culminating in Reigns "getting booed out of the building" after winning the 2015 Royal Rumble.

For those arguing that Reigns is getting go away heat, their reason is due his perceived forced push, as he would headline WrestleMania 31 after wrestling only two singles matches on pay-per-view despite having a "very limited" in-ring moveset, "forced promo delivery" and a "petulant and annoyed" attitude ill-befitting of a top fan favorite. Reigns' first coronation was set to happen in the main event of WrestleMania 31, but WWE ultimately decided to go with Rollins cashing-in his Money in the Bank contract and win the title to avoid further negative reactions towards Reigns. Reigns would eventually win three world titles and two consecutive WrestleMania main events (against Triple H at WrestleMania 32 and The Undertaker at WrestleMania 33) despite the continuing negative reactions by both critics and fans alike, which has led PWI readers to vote him as "Most Hated Wrestler of the Year" for 2016, a first for a heroic character since the award was devised in 1972. It should also be noted that "business went up" with Cena, who has been also one of the best merchandising seller in WWE history, whereas the period in which WWE tried to push Reigns as the new face of the company and gave him multiple coronations at WrestleMania saw a much quicker decline in Raw viewership by late 2015, when Reigns was made the number one contender for the world title in October and eventually winning the title three times between November 2015 and April 2016.

In August 2018 at SummerSlam, the audience started out giving Reigns a mixed crowd reaction during his entrance, but upon winning the WWE Universal Championship from Brock Lesnar, Reigns was cheered. The following night on Raw, Reigns was again booed early in the show, but received a mixed reaction for suggesting that he defend his newly won championship against Finn Bálor later that night. After beating Bálor, Reigns was again heavily booed by the crowd, which increased in intensity after the match when Braun Strowman attempted to cash in his Money in the Bank title shot. The subsequent Shield reunion and attack on Strowman was positively received by the Brooklyn audience, but was viewed by many as a cheap attempt to garner positive reactions for Reigns.

However, all the heat diminished as of the October 22, 2018 episode of Raw, when Reigns announced that he was re-diagnosed with leukemia after 11 years and would be taking a hiatus to treat it. As a result, he relinquished the Universal Championship, ending his reign of 64 days. Reigns initially received a mixed reaction upon entering the arena, but was welcomed with a positive reception after his announcement of leukemia was made.

== See also ==
- Glossary of professional wrestling terms
