= Christy Hemme =

American professional wrestler

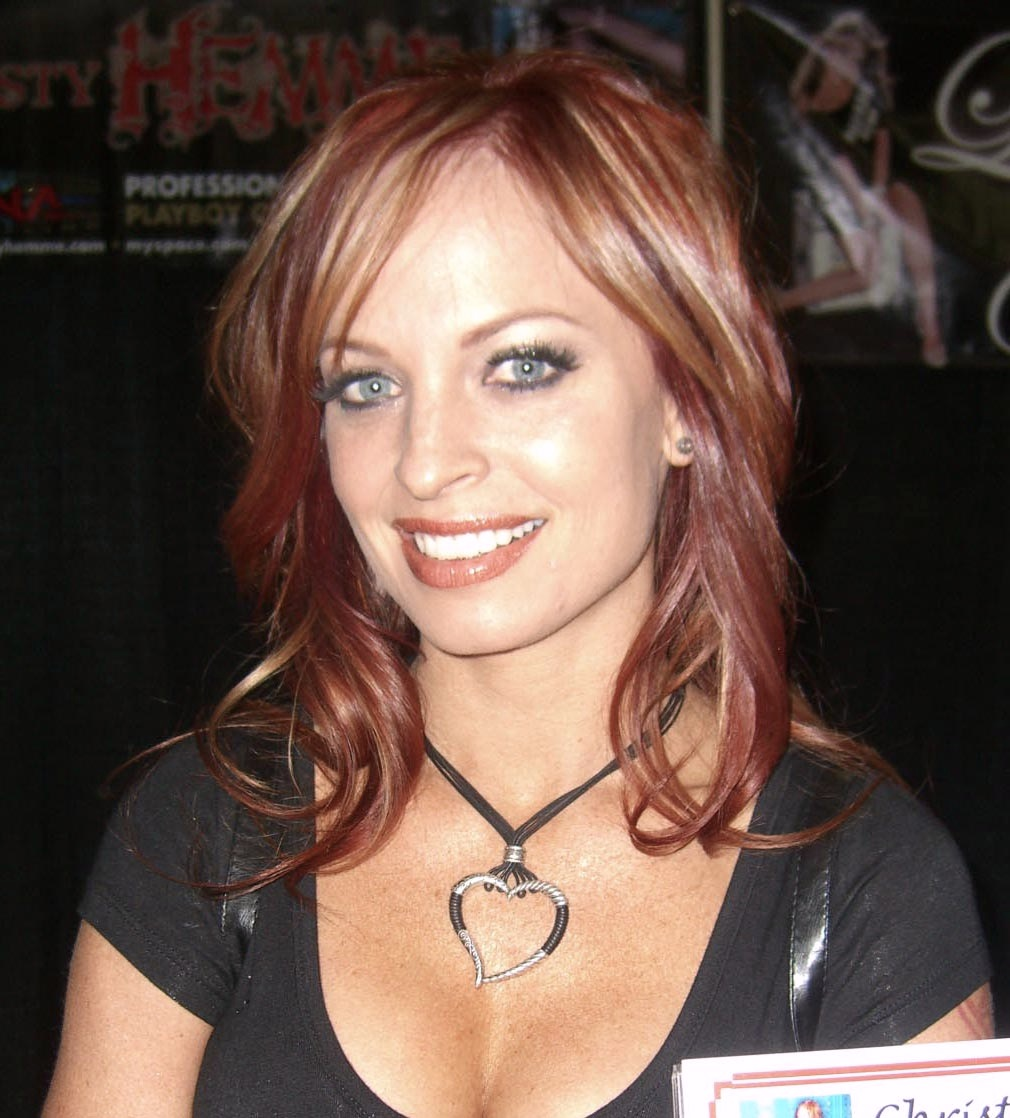
- Hemme in 2009

Personal information
- Born: Christina Lee Hemme; October 28, 1980 (age 46) Poway, California, U.S.
- Education: Mt. San Jacinto College
- Children: 5

Professional wrestling career
- Ring name: Christy Hemme
- Billed height: 5 ft 5 in (1.70 m)
- Billed weight: 117 lb (54 kg)
- Billed from: San Diego, California; Temecula, California
- Trained by: Arn Anderson; Dean Malenko; Fit Finlay; Inoki Dojo (California); Lisa Marie Varon; Ricky Steamboat; Scott D'Amore; Lita
- Debut: 2004
- Retired: 2010

Christina Lee Hemme (/ˈhɛmi/ HEM-i; born October 28, 1980) is an American wrestling executive and retired professional wrestler, ring announcer, backstage interviewer, singer and model. She is best known for her time in Total Nonstop Action Wrestling (TNA) where she performed as a wrestler and ring announcer. She also worked as a front office executive at the company. She is also a former wrestler in WWE, where she won the 2004 Diva Search.

== Early life ==
Hemme was born in Poway, California, but she grew up in Temecula, California. She enjoyed racing street bikes and dirt bikes. She was a "self-described" tomboy. She grew up watching wrestling and favored The Undertaker.

She was a cheerleader for two years at Temecula Valley High School. She graduated in 1998 at age seventeen. Hemme attended Mt. San Jacinto College, where she majored in dance.

== Modeling career ==
After graduating, she relocated to Los Angeles, California to pursue a career in modeling. Hemme initially joined a burlesque dance team known as "The Purrfect Angelz". She performed at Easyrider tours and Harley motorcycle rallies. She went on to appear in magazines such as Maxim, Playboy, Rolling Stone, and Stuff. In addition, she appeared in the music video of the Trace Adkins songs "Chrome", and "Honky Tonk Badonkadonk" and in videos for bands Blink-182 and Sonic. She also had parts in commercials for AT&T Corporation and TrimSpa, and she was a spokesmodel for Hawaiian Tropic. Other early jobs included a waitressing job at Hooters.

In past years, her image has also been found on Bench Warmer trading cards as Christy "Sunni" Hemme. As Sunni, she was Bullz-eye.com's featured model in September 2002. Her modeling career led to her joining the cast of Comedy Central's The Man Show as a member of the "Juggy Dance Squad" in 2003. Hemme remained with the series for a year, during which she appeared on The Commies, a Comedy Central produced award show, on December 7, 2003.

Hemme took part in the 2004 Lingerie Bowl. She appeared on the cover of the April 2005 issue of Playboy magazine. Before appearing nude in the magazine, Hemme got the permission of her father, who had previously requested that she never pose nude. She also competed as a quarterback for the Chicago Bliss Lingerie Football League team in the 2006 Lingerie Bowl.

== Professional wrestling career ==
=== World Wrestling Entertainment ===
==== Diva Search (2004) ====
In mid-2004, Hemme participated in the Diva Search, a competition held by World Wrestling Entertainment (WWE) to recruit new WWE Divas. In the course of the competition, Hemme and the five other finalists faced seven existing Divas in a game of dodgeball at SummerSlam on August 15, eliminating all eight Divas with the loss of just one finalist, Joy Giovanni. Hemme was announced as the winner of the competition on September 20, with a prize of a one-year contract with WWE, with remuneration of $250,000.

==== Brand switches (2004–2005) ====
Hemme began her WWE career as a member of the Raw roster. She quickly began a feud with Carmella DeCesare, the runner-up of the Diva Search. The feud culminated in a "lingerie pillow fight" at Taboo Tuesday on October 19, which Hemme won.

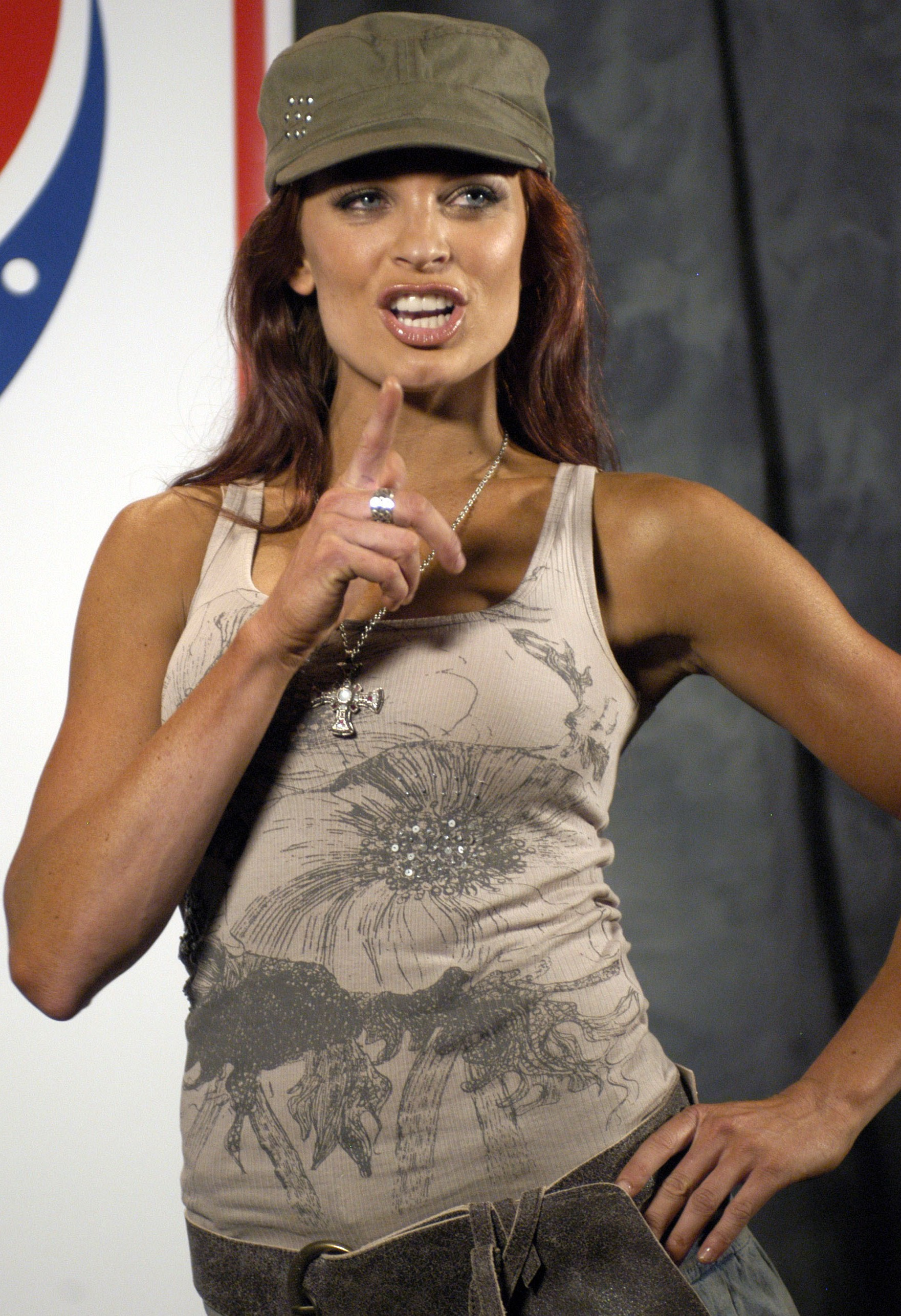
Hemme in 2005

Following her feud with DeCesare, Hemme began a rivalry with WWE Women's Champion Trish Stratus. Stratus, along with Molly Holly and Gail Kim, threw Hemme an initiation party, but, it soon turned into a 3-on-1 Bra and Panties Handicap match, which Hemme lost. As Stratus was ostensibly scornful of Hemme's appearance in the April 2005 issue of Playboy, Stratus interrupted Hemme's unveiling and spray painted all over the cover. Hemme responded by slapping her, which resulted in Stratus knocking her out with a Chick Kick and spraying the word "slut" on her back. Hemme eventually challenged Stratus to a match at WrestleMania 21, with Stratus' nemesis Lita training her in the weeks preceding the event. At the event on April 3, Hemme unsuccessfully challenged Stratus for the Women's Championship.

In the months after WrestleMania, Hemme began a feud with Victoria, who claimed to be jealous of the opportunities afforded to Hemme. Hemme would feud with Victoria during Raw house shows, and defeated her on several occasions. On the June 6 episode of Raw, Hemme teamed up with Rosey and The Hurricane in a losing effort to Victoria and The Heart Throbs (Antonio and Romeo) in a six-person mixed tag team match. The feud culminated in a bout at Vengeance on June 26, which Victoria won. With her feud with Victoria over, Hemme briefly aligned herself with Eugene, before she and Stacy Keibler were traded to the SmackDown! brand in exchange for Candice Michelle and Torrie Wilson, on August 25.

On the September 30 episode of SmackDown!, Hemme began a feud with Melina, the valet of MNM, after losing to her in a singles match, and in the process joined forces with the Legion of Doom. At No Mercy on October 9, Hemme and the Legion of Doom defeated MNM in a six-person intergender tag team match. Her feud with Melina continued on November 25 with Melina defeating Hemme.

==== Ohio Valley Wrestling (2005) ====
On November 30, Hemme debuted in Ohio Valley Wrestling (OVW), a WWE developmental territory, aligning herself with Matt Cappotelli in opposition to Aaron Stevens, Beth Phoenix, and Shelly Martinez. On the December 7 episode of OVW TV, Hemme teamed up with Cappotelli in a winning effort defeating Stevens, Phoenix, and Martinez in three-on-two handicap match.

On December 5, 2005, Hemme was released from her WWE contract. The release happened shortly after WWE asked her to relocate to Louisville, Kentucky to train at OVW. The company cited budget cuts and the creative team having nothing for her as the reason for her dismissal.

In November 2008, in her column for TNAwrestling.com, Hemme stated her departure from WWE was on her own terms.

=== Return to WWE (2017) ===
Hemme appeared at the 2017 WWE Hall of Fame to support Beth Phoenix, the first time she has been seen in the WWE since 2005.

=== Total Nonstop Action Wrestling ===
==== The Rock 'n Rave Infection (2006–2008) ====
Hemme signed with Total Nonstop Action Wrestling (TNA) in April 2006, and she debuted on April 23 at Lockdown. In addition to her hosting role on Impact!, she was also the co-host of the Internet show TNA Global Impact! with Jeremy Borash. At Hardcore War, Hemme refereed a match between Traci and Gail Kim. In July 2006, she was featured on the Women of Action special. She also began traveling to Windsor, Ontario to train under TNA agent Scott D'Amore in between TNA television tapings. Hemme was also voted the 2006 Knockout of the Year.

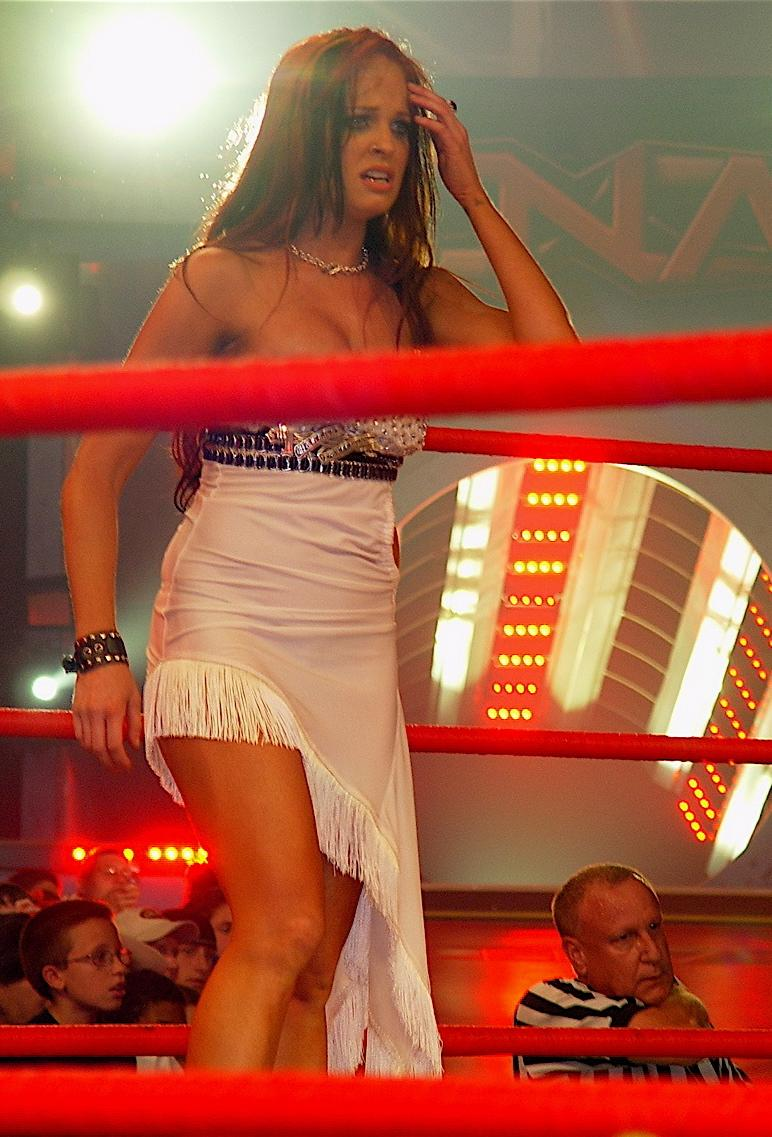
Hemme during a TNA! event in 2007

On January 14, 2007, at Final Resolution, Hemme interrupted the Voodoo Kin Mafia (VKM) and cut a promo about the involvement of women in wrestling. She said that she wanted to wrestle too, and the mostly male crowd in the TNA arena jeered her. Kip James called her a "slut", which garnered him a slap from Hemme, while B.G. James attempted to play peacemaker, turning Hemme heel in the process. In the following weeks, Kip and Hemme argued over his lack of respect for her and women in general. Hemme made her TNA in-ring debut at Against All Odds, where she wrestled and defeated "The Big Fat Oily Guy" in a Tuxedo match, but after his match, Kip James stripped her of her clothes. On the March 8 episode of Impact, Hemme asked Jim Cornette for a match pitting the Voodoo Kin Mafia against her new, previously undisclosed, team, at Destination X. Cornette consented and booked the match. At the pay-per-view, Hemme introduced The Heartbreakers. Despite Hemme's attempts to give Kip James a low blow, the VKM defeated her team, who she later browbeat at ringside. Hemme later announced that she had found another team to face the VKM. On the pre-show prior to the Lockdown pay-per-view, the mystery team was revealed to be Serotonin (Havok and Kaz), but VKM defeated them as well. She then brought in Basham and Damaja as her new permanent tag team in her battle with VKM. The team beat Kip in a handicap match at Sacrifice, as B.G. had been attacked by them earlier in the night. At Slammiversary, VKM beat Basham and Damaja, but VKM's associate Lance Hoyt turned on them and kissed Hemme. at Bound for Glory, Hemme competed in the Gauntlet for the Gold match to crown the first TNA Women's Knockout Champion but was unable to continue and was removed from the match by EMTs.

Basham and Damaja were then released from the company, and Hoyt formed a partnership with Jimmy Rave, dubbed The Rock 'n Rave Infection, with Hemme as their manager. In the winter of 2007, Hemme, Rave, and Hoyt began a feud with The Latin American Xchange (LAX) faction after being attacked several times by a mysterious assailant. The assailant was revealed to be Salinas at Final Resolution following LAX's victory over the Infection. Shortly after Final Resolution, The Rock 'n Rave Infection began a new gimmick, portraying a rock band, with Hemme as the lead singer. On the March 13 episode of Impact, Hemme, Rave and Hoyt won a six-person tag team match against LAX after Hemme hit Salinas with a guitar. At No Surrender, Hemme, Hoyt, and Rave lost in an intergender six-person tag team match against the Prince Justice Brotherhood (Shark Boy, Curry Man, and Super Eric).

==== Singles competition (2008–2009) ====
On the October 16, 2008 episode of Impact!, Hoyt and Rave were attacked by Kurt Angle, and were hospitalized. As Hemme attempted to leave the building and go to the hospital, The Beautiful People (Angelina Love and Velvet Sky) and Cute Kip confronted and insulted her, which led to the trio attacking her and placing a brown paper bag over her head. Hemme transitioned into a face by defeating Sky on the October 23, 2008 episode of Impact!. She feuded with the Beautiful People, which resulted in two consecutive tag team matches with ODB and Sojourner Bolt as per partners, respectively. After showcasing improved wrestling skills, Hemme was then placed into a more active in-ring role, being pushed to challenge Awesome Kong for the TNA Women's Knockout Championship at Final Resolution, after defeating Raisha Saeed on the November 27 episode of TNA Impact!. Hemme then teamed with A.J. Styles in a mixed tag team match against Kong and Scott Steiner, where Hemme pinned Kong. At Final Resolution, Hemme was attacked by Saeed and Rhaka Khan and won the match by disqualification, and thus Kong retained the title. Hemme was subsequently granted a rematch at Genesis. A week later, Hemme teamed with ODB against Khan and Saeed in a winning effort. In 2009, Hemme sustained a neck injury while in a match with Awesome Kong, and was deemed unable to compete at Genesis.

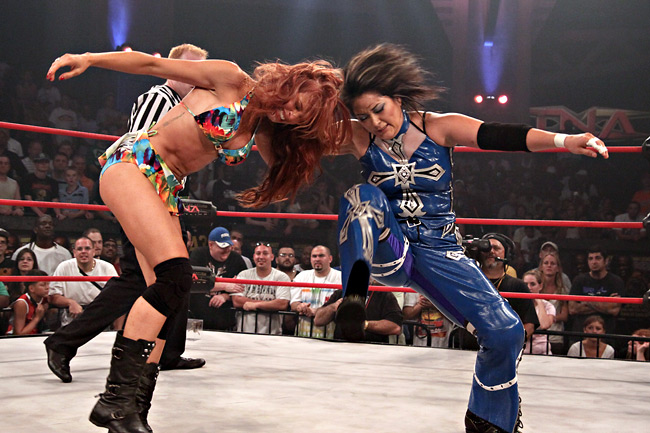
Hemme wrestling Hamada in 2009

After a seven-month absence, Hemme returned on the August 13, 2009 episode of Impact!, defeating Sojournor Bolt. The following week on Impact, she formed an alliance with her former rival Tara, when they helped save Madison Rayne from an attack from Angelina Love and Velvet Sky. Later that night, Hemme competed in a four-way match against Sarita, Awesome Kong and Traci Brooks, which Brooks won. On the September 3 episode of Impact, Hemme competed in the first round of the tournament for the TNA Knockouts Tag Team Championship alongside her tag partner Tara against Sojourner Bolt and Hamada, which Hemme and Tara won. However, on September 17, the duo lost in the semi-finals to the Beautiful People due to interference from Madison Rayne. On the October 1 episode of Impact!, Hemme defeated Traci Brooks in a "Battle of the Playboy Models" match, but was attacked by Brooks after the match. On the October 29 episode of Impact!, Hemme teamed with Hamada and ODB in a six-woman tag team match, where they were defeated by Rayne, Sky and Lacey Von Erich, after Von Erich pinned Hemme.

==== Ring announcer, interviewer, and backstage roles (2009–2016; 2022-2025) ====
On the December 10 episode of Impact! Hemme debuted in her new role as a backstage interviewer. On December 16, 2009, Hemme announced her retirement from in-ring competition. On April 7, 2010, Dixie Carter announced that Hemme had signed a new multi-year deal with the company. On the December 2 episode on Impact!, Hemme was involved in a small backstage catfight with Cookie during a brawl with Cookie's cohort, X Division Champion Robbie E, and Jay Lethal. On the December 16 episode of Impact!, Hemme came out during an X Division Championship match between Robbie E and Lethal and handcuffed herself to Cookie, thus preventing her from interfering in the match and subsequently costing Robbie the X Division Championship. After the match, Hemme and Lethal celebrated, which led to a kiss between the two.

On the April 28, 2011 episode of Impact!, Hemme began working as a ring announcer. On the September 20, 2012 episode of Impact Open Fight Night, Hemme was called out by Tara, only to be attacked by her after she refused to say Tara was her favorite Knockout. Miss Tessmacher then made the save for Hemme.

In November 2013, Hemme was put in a storyline with Samuel Shaw, after Hemme interviewed Shaw at his home. Shaw later became an obsessed fan of Hemme, and started asking her on dates, including one in his house, where it was shown that Shaw had a room full of posters and a mannequin of Hemme. Hemme was confronted by Shaw on the February 27 episode of Impact Wrestling after an incident the previous week, in which she was injured when Shaw attacked Mr. Anderson. Hemme was used as a shield by Shaw to fend off Mr. Anderson after Anderson attempted to save Hemme from Shaw after she slapped him as well as exact revenge for the previous week's attack.

On April 7, 2014, Hemme was announced as member of the TNA creative team. On April 24, 2015, episode of Impact Wrestling, Hemme was attacked by the debuting Jade and Marti Bell of The Dollhouse, after Jade lost a match to Laura Dennis. In February 2016, Hemme took an hiatus from TNA being replaced by Jeremy Borash. On April 1, 2016, she announced her departure from TNA.

In March 2022, Hemme returned to TNA, now known as Impact Wrestling, in a backstage capacity, working in production. At Slammiversary later that year, returning to her ring announcing duties for one night only. She once again returned to the company, now once again known as TNA, in the fall of 2024. She had begun to hold the position of Head of Marketing. However, in February 2025, Hemme departed the company once again.

=== Independent circuit (2006–2009, 2011) ===
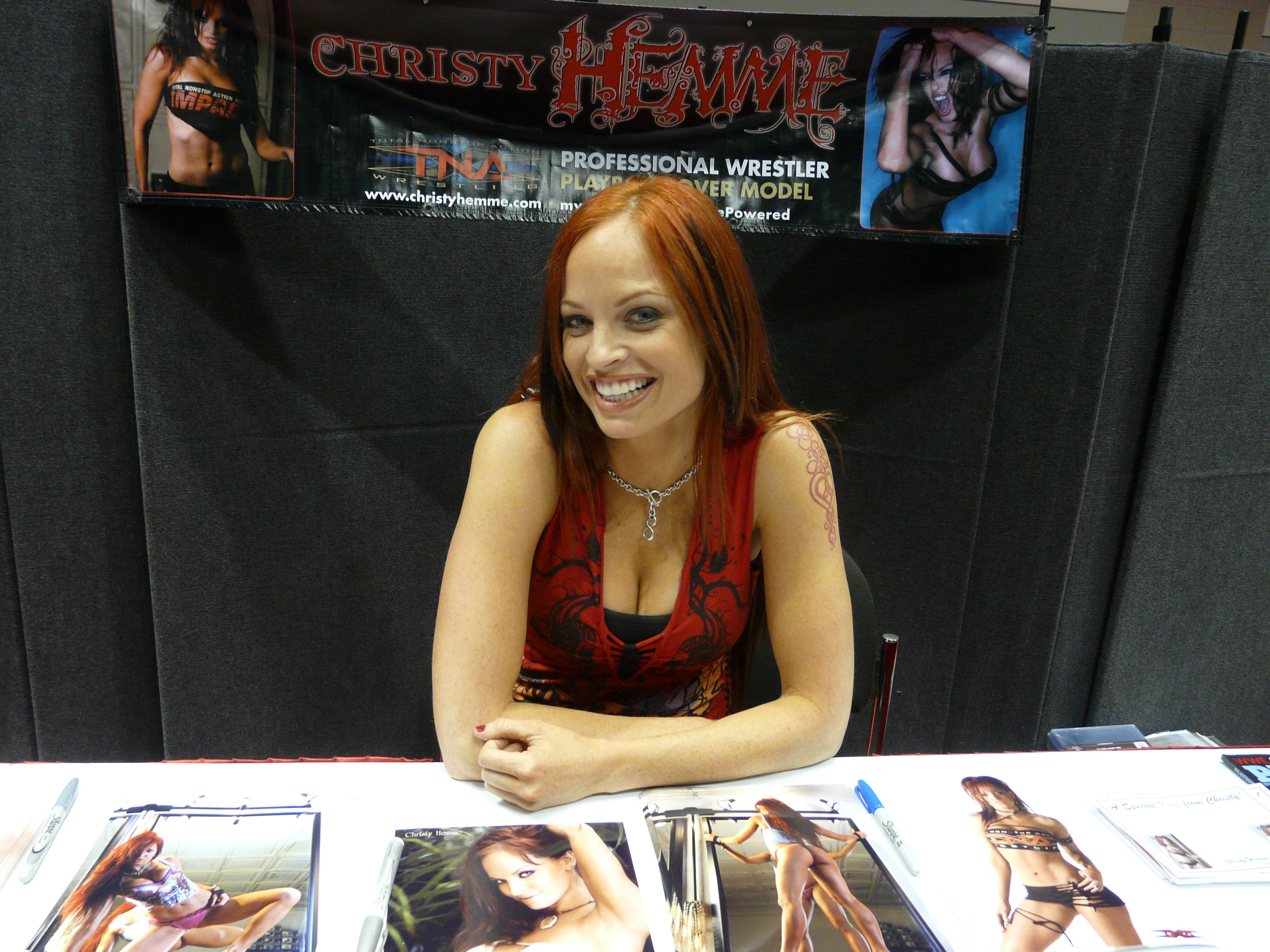
Hemme in 2008

In November 2006, Hemme participated in the Queens of Chaos shows in Paris, France. She wrestled in a pair of singles matches against the villainous April Hunter; Hemme won the first match, but lost the second. She then defeated British wrestler Minx to earn the right to referee the championship match, which was eventually won by Hunter. On July 21, 2007, Hemme defeated Ann Brookstone at a Heavy on Wrestling event in Superior, Wisconsin with Nora Greenwald acting as a guest referee. She has also competed in Women Superstars Uncensored under the ring name Kristy Hemme.

Christy made her debut for Northeast Wrestling (NEW) on the November 7, 2009 at the Saugerties Slam pay-per-view, where she competed against Velvet Sky. On November 13, at the Hart Attack pay-per-view, Hemme captured her first victory, defeating Alexxis Nevaeh with Kurt Adonis as the special guest referee. On November 14, at the NEW special event Autumn Ambush pay-per-view, Hemme defeated Lea Morrison in a singles match.

On May 14, 2011, Hemme made her debut for Family Wrestling Entertainment (FWE) at the Meltdown pay-per-view, as a special guest referee for a match between fellow TNA Knockouts Winter and Rosita.

=== KAYfABE (2020) ===
In March 2020, Hemme, along with Lita and Gail Kim, announced "KAYfABE", a new wrestling show inspired by true events which blends scripted drama with pro wrestling. Following the delay of its debut, the team cited the financial impacts of the global COVID-19 pandemic as a reason for the campaign's difficulties and assured fans that the show would secure funding elsewhere at a later date

== Music and acting ==
In September 2006, Hemme recorded a song entitled "Society Box", which was featured on TNA's November 21, 2006 music release, 3rd Degree Burns. Hemme is also the founder and lead singer in HEMME. The band released five songs on their MySpace: "In This Moment", "Visit Me Mom", "Shine", "Dear You", and "Dirty"; the songs have since been removed following the departure of original members Randy Ramirez, Steve Goodwin, Roland Maniago, and Rocky Ramirez, all from the band POLARIS. Hemme released another song, "Don't Give Up", and an EP entitled "Where are You", which is available on iTunes. The EP features Eric Friedman on Guitar and Garrett Whitlock on drums. Both are currently playing in the band Tremonti and formerly of the band Submersed.

In November 2009, Hemme recorded a scene for Bloodstained Memoirs, a wrestling documentary. Her scene can be seen in the special extras of the DVD. Hemme made her acting debut in the film Fallen Angels, portraying the deadly sin "Lust". She also filmed a role in another horror film titled Bubba's Chili Parlor, playing a zombie.

In November 2010, Hemme was a contestant on an all TNA week of Family Feud, teaming with Angelina Love, Lacey Von Erich, Tara and Velvet Sky against Jay Lethal, Matt Morgan, Mick Foley, Mr. Anderson and Rob Van Dam.

== Personal life ==
Hemme has a brother, David, and a sister, Deena Hemme, who is also a model. Hemme is an avid motorcyclist. She owns a Harley-Davidson Dyna Low Rider.

Hemme married Charley Patterson in 2010. The couple have five children together.

== Filmography ==
Film and television

Year	Title	Role	Notes
2003–2004	The Man Show	Juggy Dancer	
2005	Lingerie Bowl	Herself	TV special
2005	WWE $250,000 Raw Diva Search	Herself	TV special
2005	WWE Hall of Fame 2005	Herself	TV special
2005	WWE Viva Las Divas	Herself	Documentary film
2006	Lingerie Bowl	Chicago Bliss Player	TV special
2006	WWE Divas: Do New York	Herself	Documentary film
2006	Fallen Angels	Lust	
2009	Bloodstained Memoirs	Herself	Documentary film
2010	Family Feud	Herself	Episode: “Family Feud TNA Wrestling Special: Day 1”
2021	WWE’s Most Wanted Treasures	Herself	Episode: “Ric Flair”

Podcasts

Year	Title	Role	Notes
2020	Chasing Glory With Lilian Garcia	Herself	2 episodes
2021	Asylum Wrestling Podcast	Herself	1 episode
2021	WrestleSlam Podcast	Herself	1 episode
2020–2022	Ring The Belle	Herself	2 episodes

== Championships and accomplishments ==
- Pro Wrestling Illustrated
  - Ranked No. 42 of the top 50 female singles wrestlers in the PWI Female 50 in 2008
- Total Nonstop Action Wrestling
  - TNA Year End Award (1 time)
    - Knockout of the Year (2006)
- World Wrestling Entertainment
  - WWE Diva Search (2004)
