= Destination X (2007) =

2007 Total Nonstop Action Wrestling pay-per-view event

- DVD cover featuring various TNA wrestlers
- Promotion: Total Nonstop Action Wrestling
- Date: March 11, 2007
- City: Orlando, Florida
- Venue: Impact Zone
- Attendance: 900
- Tagline: First You Must Die...in Order to Live

Pay-per-view chronology
← Previous; Against All Odds	Next → Lockdown

Destination X chronology
← Previous; 2006	Next → 2008

The 2007 Destination X was a professional wrestling pay-per-view (PPV) event produced by Total Nonstop Action Wrestling (TNA), which took place on March 11, 2007 from the TNA Impact! Zone in Orlando, Florida. It was the third event under the Destination X chronology. Nine matches were featured on the event's card.

== Storylines ==
The event featured wrestlers from pre-existing scripted feuds and storylines. Wrestlers portrayed villains, heroes, or less distinguishable characters in the scripted events that built tension and culminated in a wrestling match or series of matches.

== Event ==
Other on-screen personnel
Role:	Name:
Commentator	Mike Tenay
Commentator	Don West
Interviewer	Jeremy Borash
Ring announcer	Jeremy Borash
Ring announcer	David Penzer
Referee	Earl Hebner
Referee	Rudy Charles
Referee	Mark Johnson
Referee	Andrew Thomas

Prior to the start of the event, Mike Tenay and Don West announced that the event would be dedicated to Ernie Ladd who died the day before.

The first match of the pay-per-view was a Ghetto Brawl. This match saw the NWA World Tag Team Champions The Latin American Xchange (Homicide and Hernandez) take on Team 3D (Brother Ray and Brother Devon) in a non-title match. The winner of the match is the first team to put their opponent through a table and pick up a pinfall. LAX picked up the win when Alex Shelley interfered and frog splashed Devon through a table.

The second match was a Double Bullrope match between James Storm and Jacqueline Moore defeated Petey Williams and Gail Kim. After Storm attempted to superkick Williams, Williams moved but got hit by a low blow by Moore. Storm once again went for the superkick, and after hitting Williams with it was able to pick up the victory via pinfall.

The next match was a Crossface Chickenwing match. The match saw Senshi take on Austin Starr, with Bob Backlund, who used the move as his finisher, at ringside. When Starr had the Crossface Chickenwing on Senshi, Backlund told the referee that Senshi's foot was under the bottom rope and the referee called for the break. Starr then began screaming and Backlund and with Starr distracted, Senshi gets the Crossface Chickenwing on Starr and picks up the submission victory. After the match, Starr attacks Backlund and applies the Crossface Chickenwing on him, until the referee breaks it up.

The next match saw The Voodoo Kin Mafia (B.G. James and Kip James) defeated The Heartbreakers (Antonio Thomas and Romeo Roselli).

The following match, for the TNA X Division Championship, saw the champion Chris Sabin defend his title against Jerry Lynn, in a Two out of Three Falls Match. Lynn won the first fall after hitting a tornado DDT off the second rope. Sabin picks up the second fall after powerbombing Lynn and utilizing the bottom rope for leverage. The match ended after someone in a Sting mask appeared on the ramp, distracting Lynn, which enabled Sabin to hit Lynn with a low blow followed by the cradle shock, and win the third fall.

A Scaffold match referred to as an Elevation X match was next. The match saw Rhino take on A.J. Styles, on a platform above the ring. The platform was approximately 20 inches wide, and shaped like an X, two stories above the ring. The first person to fall off the platform into the ring would lose the match. When Styles attempted to hit Rhino with white powder, Rhino was able to turn it on Styles who got hit with it instead. Rhino then gored Styles, knocking him off, however Styles was able to hold on. Rhino then stomped on Styles' fingers, who fell into the ring, to give Rhino the win.

The next match saw Kurt Angle defeat Scott Steiner. After the match, the crowd chanted "that was weak" showing their dissatisfaction in the match.

The second to last match was a Last Rites match between Sting and Abyss. Sting ultimately picks up the victory by getting Abyss into the casket, which is raised to the ceiling following the match.

The main event was for the NWA World Heavyweight Championship. This match saw Christian Cage defend his title against Samoa Joe. Joe attempted to get the clutch on Cage, however Cage hit Joe with a low blow. Cage went to a move off the top however Joe hit him with an Enziguri. Cage kicked out but Joe got the clutch locked in. Cage however while Joe still has it locked in, is able to get Joe's shoulders down while using the ropes for leverage.

== Results ==
No.	Results	Stipulations	Times
1	The Latin American Xchange (Homicide and Hernandez) (with Konnan) defeated Team 3D (Brother Ray and Brother Devon) (with Johnny Rodz)	Ghetto Brawl	14:50
2	James Storm and Jacqueline Moore defeated Petey Williams and Gail Kim	Double Bullrope match	8:05
3	Senshi defeated Austin Starr (with Bob Backlund) by submission	Crossface Chickenwing match	11:10
4	The Voodoo Kin Mafia (B.G. James and Kip James) defeated The Heartbreakers (Antonio Thomas and Romeo Roselli) (with Christy Hemme)	Tag team match	9:07
5	Chris Sabin (c) defeated Jerry Lynn	Two-out-of-three falls match for the TNA X Division Championship	13:30
6	Rhino defeated A.J. Styles	Elevation X match	12:40
7	Kurt Angle defeated Scott Steiner	Singles match	12:00
8	Sting defeated Abyss	Last Rites match	9:51
9	Christian Cage (c) defeated Samoa Joe	Singles match for the NWA World Heavyweight Championship	17:10
(c) / – the champion(s) heading into the match
