= Romeo Roselli =

American wrestler (born 1981)

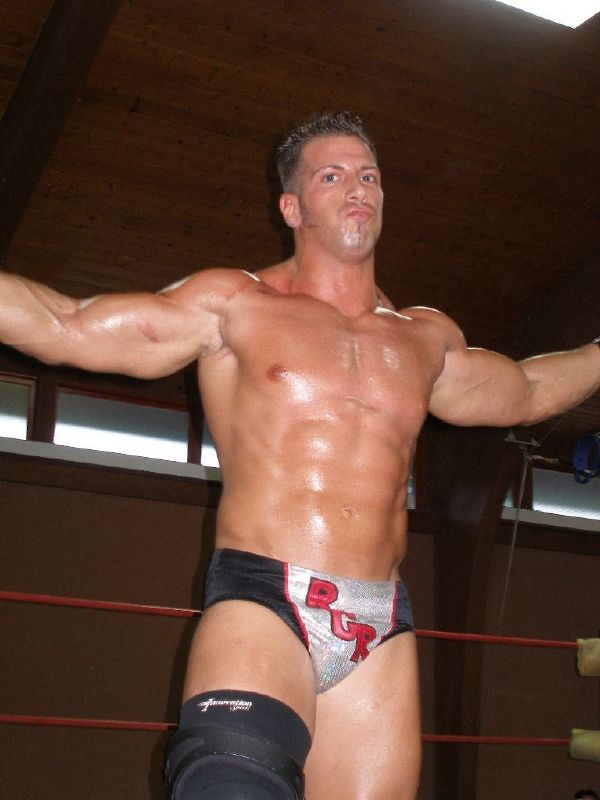

Personal information
- Born: Giovanni Roselli; September 23, 1981 (age 44) White Plains, New York, U.S.
- Education: Sacred Heart University
- Website: giovanniroselli.com

Professional wrestling career
- Ring name(s): Giovanni Roselli; Johnny Heartbreaker; Johnny Romano; Johnny Roselli; Heartthrob Romeo; Romeo Roselli; Romeo
- Billed height: 6 ft 1 in (1.85 m)
- Billed weight: 240 lb (110 kg)
- Billed from: Atlantic City, New Jersey
- Trained by: Kevin Landry; Dory Funk Jr. Tom Prichard; Bill DeMott; Lance Storm
- Debut: 1998
- Retired: 2025

Giovanni "Johnny" Roselli (born September 23, 1981) is an American professional wrestler and actor better known as Romeo Roselli. He is best known for his work with World Wrestling Entertainment, on its RAW brand, as one half of the tag team "The Heart Throbs" under the ring name Romeo.

== Career ==
=== Early career (1998–2004) ===
Roselli began wrestling on the independent circuit, initially training in Springfield, Massachusetts under Kevin Landry.

From 1998 to 2000, Roselli wrestled as a heel, regularly appearing for the video-based promotion Junior Pro Wrestling Association as Johnny Heartbreaker. He rose to the top of the JPWA ranks after defeating top-ranked Damian "Lionheart" Campari. Heartbreaker went on to have the JPWA's longest undefeated streak until, after losing an arm wrestling challenge to Biff Backstreet, Backstreet challenged him to a match and was victorious. At the demise of the JPWA in 2002, Heartbreaker had the 3rd highest number of wins, behind Sasha "The Russian Skullcrusher" and Campari. Roselli also appeared for the video-based BG East Wrestling as Johnny Romano.

With JPWA closing, Johnny Heartbreaker started wrestling for New Era Pro Wrestling. While there, he formed a tag team with Mike Preston called the VIP. On July 13, 2002, they won the vacant NEPW United States Tag Team Championship which they would hold until they vacated the titles in March 2003.

In 2003, Johnny Heartbreaker formed a tag team with Antonio Thomas called the Heart Breakers. On January 23, 2004, in Southbridge, Massachusetts, they defeated Cueball and Nick McKenna to win the Eastern Wrestling Alliance Tag Team Championship. The Heart Breakers lost the titles to Clinically Inclined (Andre Lyonz and Dr. Heresy) on June 18.

=== World Wrestling Entertainment (2004–2006) ===
In June 2004, Roselli moved to Louisville, Kentucky to train and wrestle in World Wrestling Entertainment's developmental territory Ohio Valley Wrestling. On August 25, Roselli made his OVW debut when he teamed up with Robbie Dawber to lose to Mac Johnson and Seth Skyfire. In late 2004, Antonio Thomas would also sign for OVW and the pair would reform their tag team, The Heart Breakers. After a few months of teaming together, they took on MNM in an OVW Southern Tag Team Championship number one contenders match but lost.

In April 2005, William Regal and Tajiri successfully defended the World Tag Team Championship against the debuting Romeo (Roselli) and Antonio (Thomas), billed as "The Heart Throbs". The Heart Throbs participated in a Tag Team Turmoil match for the belts at Backlash, but were unsuccessful.

The heel team mainly appeared on the Raw brand's B-show, Heat. They have short-lived feuds with the teams of Eugene and William Regal, Hurricane and Rosey, and V-Squared (Val Venis and Viscera).

During the first Heat episode of 2006, the pair turned face and began regularly bringing two "hot chicks" into the ring with them to dance. On February 10, 2006 both of The Heart Throbs were released from WWE.

=== Independent circuit (2006–2017) ===
Since his release from World Wrestling Entertainment, Roselli has worked for many US independent promotions and has sometimes competed against and teamed up with Antonio Thomas. He has also had the chance to wrestle in over countries as well such as Italy, Puerto Rico and the United Kingdom.

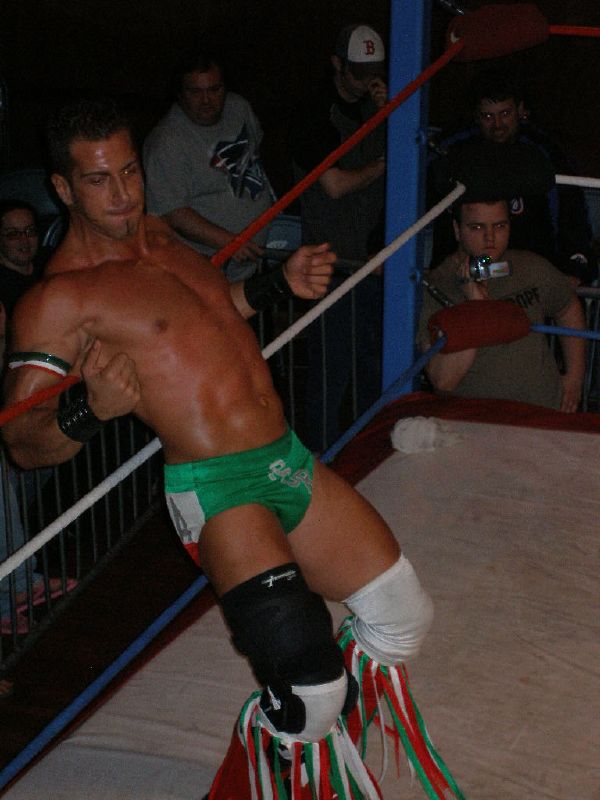
Roselli in the ring in 2007

On March 23, Roselli returned to the New York independent circuit at Northeast Wrestling's Wrestlefest X in a losing effort against Mikey Batts. In April, Roselli had a one-month tour at Puerto Rico's main wrestling promotion, World Wrestling Council. He defeated El Bronco for the WWC Puerto Rico Heavyweight Championship, and re-lost the title to him in a Loser Leaves Town rematch, before returning to the US. Roselli returned to Ohio Valley Wrestling in October where he lost to Paul Burchill. Roselli then went to Europe to tour with Nu-Wrestling Evolution. On December 10, 2006, in Palermo, Italy, Romeo defeated Vampiro to win the NWE Heavyweight Championship, becoming only the third champion in NWE history, and the first of Italian heritage.

On January 13, 2007, Roselli debuted for Full Impact Pro when he teamed up with Antonio Thomas and Shiima Xion and lost to Pelle Primeau and The Heartbreak Express (Phil Davis and Sean Davis). On March 10, 2007 Roselli defeated Jason Blade in the opening match on a NEW event. On April 6, Roselli made his UK debut when he defended the NWE World Heavyweight Championship against Sterling James Keenan at One Pro Wrestling. On April 22, Roselli announced his surprise partner for the evening as Joey Mercury on a NEW event in Bristol, Connecticut and the duo, managed by TNA Knockout Velvet Sky went on to defeat Vik Dalishus and Hale Collins of The NOW. On May 4, 2007, Roselli made a rare US NWE World Heavyweight Championship title defense at Top Rope Promotions at the 2007 Killer Kowalski Cup where he defeated Mike Bennett. On May 11, Roselli and Thomas teamed up to take part in a gauntlet match for the International Wrestling Cartel Tag Team Championship which was eventually won by Johnny Gargano and Michael Facade.

On April 19, 2008, Roselli was stripped of the NWE World Heavyweight Championship after an attack by Orlando Jordan. In October, he took on Myke Quest for the National Wrestling Superstars Jersey Shore Championship and lost. In 2009, Roselli had two opportunities to win the NEW Heavyweight Championship but failed on every occasion (April 25, November 7). In late 2009, Roselli began wrestling for Victory Pro Wrestling and has had two chances to win the VPW New York State Championship but failed both times (October 6, 2012, November 23, 2013). He holds VPW victories over VSK, Jorge Santi, Kevin Fulton, and Johnny Armani. On June 29, 2013 he defeated ROH wrestler Vinny Marseglia in the opening match of a NEW event in Southbury, Connecticut.

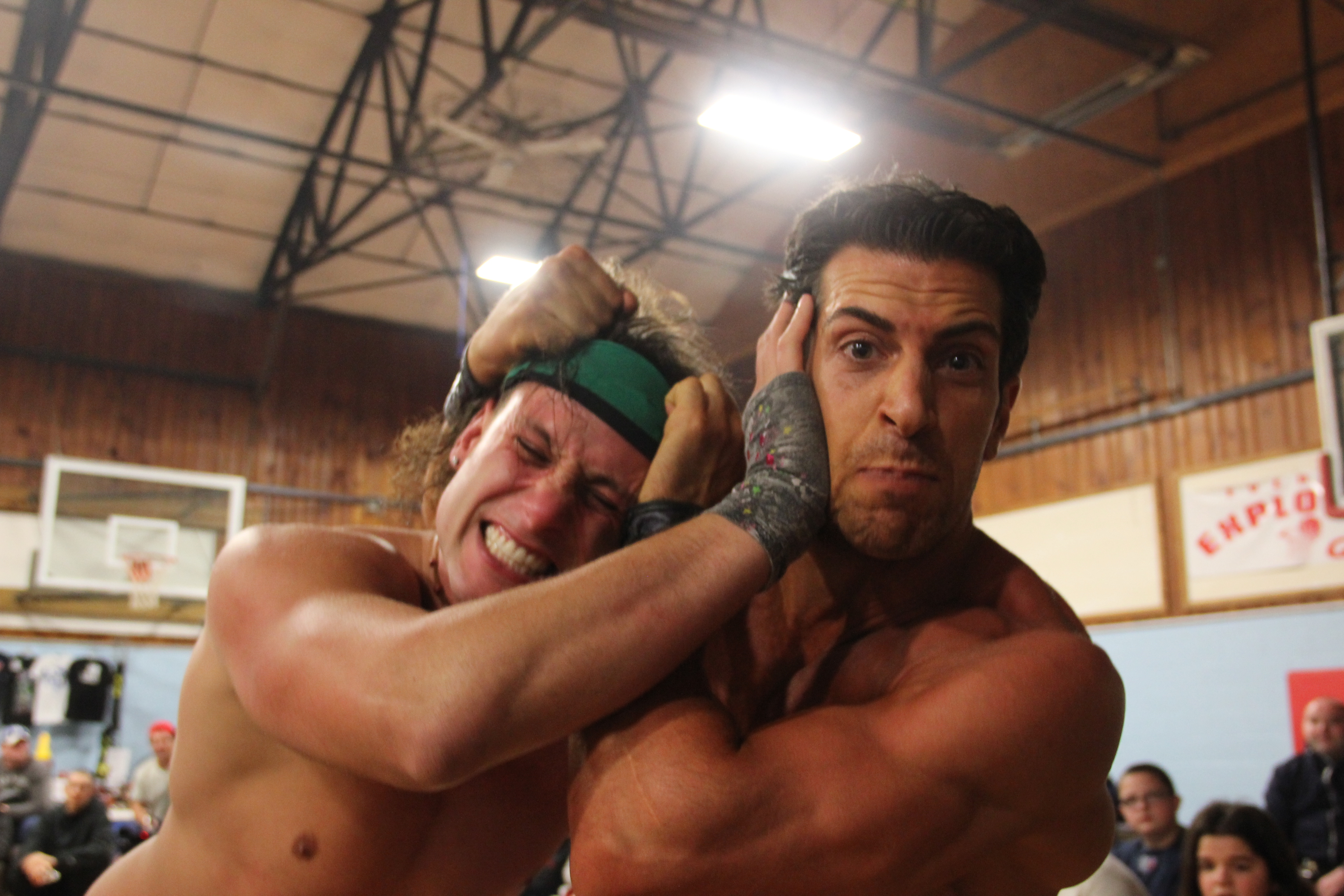
Roselli (right) against ROH Television Champion Matt Taven in 2013

On July 28, 2012, The Heart Throbs made their debut for Chikara, teaming with The Young Bucks (Matt and Nick Jackson) in an eight-man tag team match, where they were defeated by Hallowicked, Jigsaw, Mike Quackenbush and UltraMantis Black. The Heart Throbs returned to the promotion on November 18, losing to 1-2-3 Kid and Marty Jannetty in a tag team match. On October 5, 2013, Roselli defeated TNA wrestler Joseph Park via disqualification. On November 14, 2013, Roselli wrestled for the ROH World Television Championship in an independent show, Robbie Ellis Tribute: A tournament of Super Juniors, against Matt Taven, but was defeated.

Roselli returned to Victory Pro Wrestling on March 8, 2014 for their eight anniversary show defeating Mr. Pogo in a show headlined by former TNA star AJ Styles. On June 1, 2014 in Spring Valley, NY for the Northeast Wrestling promotion, Roselli had a face to face encounter with WWE Hall of Famer Mick Foley. On August 2, 2014 Roselli defeated WWE Hall of Famer Booker T Huffman Reality of Wrestling student Sergei Volkov in front of 3000 fans in Fishkill, New York at Dutchess Stadium. A year prior, Roselli defeated former Major League Baseball pitcher Joe Ausiano in the same venue on September 21, 2013. Roselli continues to tour the independent circuit for Northeast Wrestling (NEW) which runs shows primarily in Connecticut and New York.

=== Total Nonstop Action Wrestling (2007) ===
At Total Nonstop Action Wrestling's Destination X PPV, on March 11, 2007, Roselli and Antonio Thomas, (billed as The Heartbreakers), were revealed as the mystery tag team selected by Christy Hemme to face the Voodoo Kin Mafia. The Heartbreakers lost the match and were never seen in TNA again.

== Other media ==
Although Roselli continues to work as an independent wrestler, he is also a certified personal trainer and has focused his attention on acting. He is a member of SAG-AFTRA, and appears in the films College Road Trip, Baby Mama, and The Wrestler.

Roselli wrote a regular column for the website WWEPreview.com and authors a fitness and wellness column for the monthly magazine WAG.

In November 2006, Roselli appeared on the FUSE TV television program Pants-Off Dance-Off. In July 2008, he returned to FUSE, on the program You Rock, Lets Roll - a dating show hosted by Jared Cotter. Roselli had to choose between three female musicians attempting to win him over with their musical talents.

In 2012, he appeared in four different episodes of the Food Network program Restaurant Stakeout in which host Willie Degel sent him in as a plant to test the wait staff.

In 2013, he appeared on the SyFy network original movie BattleDogs, which stars Craig Sheffer, Dennis Haysbert, Kate Vernon, and Ernie Hudson.

In the summer of 2013, Roselli was cast as the personal trainer for the National Geographic Channel program Brain Games and appeared alongside host Jason Silva in seasons 3 and 4.

Roselli plays one of the principal characters, Tony, in the comedy-horror feature film Jersey Shore Massacre, which is executive produced by Jenni Jwoww Farley.

=== Filmography ===
Film and Television
| Year | Film or Series | Role | Notes |
|---|---|---|---|
| 2007-2009 | As the World Turns | Bartender / Club Patron / Fredo's Thug | Three episodes |
| 2008 | College Road Trip | Trojan Shouter | Uncredited |
| 2008 | Baby Mama | The Club Guido | Uncredited |
| 2008 | The Wrestler | Romeo Roselli | Short |
| 2008 | You Rock, Let's Roll | Bachelor | |
| 2008-2015 | Saturday Night Live | Bartender / Spartan Soldier/RJ | Three episodes |
| 2009 | Late Night with Jimmy Fallon | Jersey Shore D-Bag | Episode #1.16 |
| 2012 | Can You Survive a Horror Movie? | Zombie Wrestler 1 | TV movie |
| 2012 | Restaurant Stakeout | Giovanni | Four episodes |
| 2013 | Deadpool: The Webseries | Guard 3 | Two episodes |
| 2013-2014 | Math Warriors | Biff | Episode #3.1 |
| 2013 | Battledogs | Daniels | TV movie |
| 2013 | The Legend of El | Bar Patron 1 | Short |
| 2013 | "Headshots and Breakdowns" | Bodybuilder | Short |
| 2013 | "Sunrise Aphrodite" | Boyfriend Joshua | Short Film |
| 2013 | "Deadly Affairs" | Bobby Lozano | TV series |
| 2013 | "I'd Kill For You" | FBI Agent | TV series |
| 2013-2014 | "Brain Games" | Jason Silva's Personal Trainer | TV series |
| 2014 | "Turn" | Dominic | Short |
| 2014 | "Rickover: The Birth Of Nuclear Powe | McShane's Aid | TV documentary |
| 2014 | Jersey Shore Massacre | Tony | Feature film |
| 2015 | Gotham | Mobster | Episode #1.12 |
| 2015 | Happyish | Bodybuilder | Episode #1.1 |
| 2016 | "In The Mix" | Giovanni | Short Film |
| 2017 | The Deuce | Mug 2 | Episode #1.1 |
| 2019 | "The Awakening" | Officer #1 | Feature film |
| 2019 | "The X-Files: Back From The Dead Fan Film" | Frank Spicolli/The Security Guard | Feature film |
| 2020 | "Death Letter: God, Sex, and War" | Marine #1 | Feature film |

== Championships and accomplishments ==
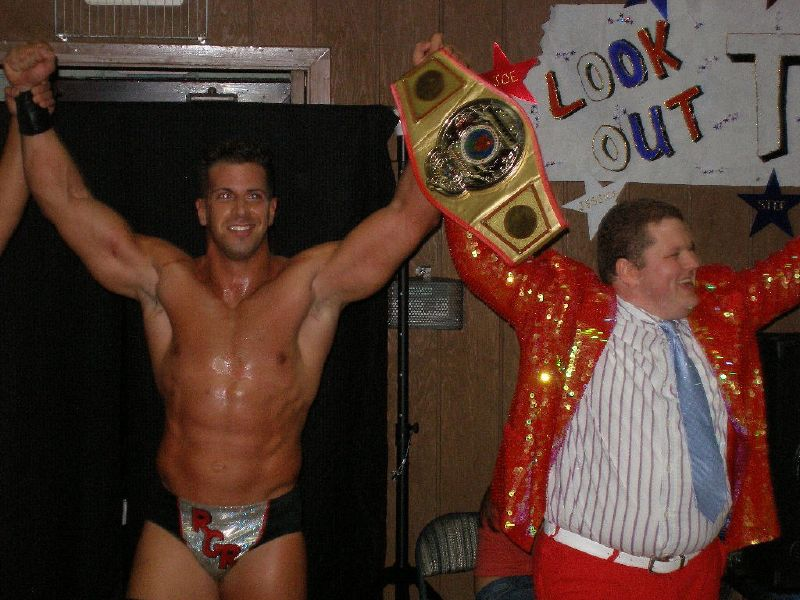
Roselli as the NEPW Heavyweight Champion in August 2007.

- Eastern Wrestling Alliance
  - EWA Tag Team Championship (2 times) – with Antonio Thomas
- Nu-Wrestling Evolution
  - NWE World Heavyweight Championship (1 time)
- New England Pro Wrestling
  - NEPW Heavyweight Championship (1 time)
- New England Pro Wrestling Hall of Fame
  - Class of 2019
- World Wrestling Council
  - WWC Puerto Rico Heavyweight Championship (1 time)
