= The Heart Throbs =

Tag team
- Members: Antonio Thomas/Antonio; Johnny Heartbreaker/Romeo Roselli/Romeo
- Name(s): The Heart Throbs; The Heart Shaped Candys; The Heartbreakers
- Billed heights: 6 ft 1 in (1.85 m) - Antonio; 6 ft 1 in (1.85 m) - Romeo
- Combined billed weight: 235 lb (107 kg) - Antonio; 220 lb (100 kg) - Romeo; 455 lb (206 kg) - both
- Billed from: Panama City, Florida
- Debut: 2003
- Years active: 2003-2015

The Heart Throbs, also known as The Heartbreakers, were a professional wrestling tag team consisting of Antonio Thomas and Romeo Roselli. They are best known for their appearances with World Wrestling Entertainment (WWE) on its Raw brand, and later competed on the independent circuit. The team was billed as being popular "with the ladies" and typically approached the ring while performing pelvic thrusts to the accompaniment of dance music.

== Career ==
=== Independent circuit (2003–2004) ===
In 2003, Johnny Heartbreaker and Antonio Thomas formed a tag team in the Eastern Wrestling Alliance called "The Heart Breakers". On January 23, 2004, in Southbridge, Massachusetts, they defeated Cueball and Nick McKenna to win the EWA Tag Team Championship. The Heart Breakers lost the titles to Clinically Inclined (Andre Lyonz and Dr. Heresy) on June 18.

=== World Wrestling Entertainment (2004–2006) ===
Thomas and Heartbreaker, now going by Romeo Roselli, joined World Wrestling Entertainment's developmental territory Ohio Valley Wrestling in 2004, though Roselli wasn't officially signed to a WWE developmental contract until February 2005.

Renamed "The Heart Throbs" and going simply by Antonio and Romeo respectively, they made their WWE debut on the April 18, 2005 episode of Raw, losing to World Tag Team Champions William Regal and Tajiri. They participated in a tag-team turmoil match for the World Tag Team Championship at Backlash 2005, but were defeated once again.

The Heart Throbs mainly appeared on the Raw B-show, Heat. They had short-lived feuds with Eugene and William Regal, The Hurricane and Rosey, and Val Venis and Viscera. In 2006, the Heart Throbs gained a great deal of fan reaction and began entertaining the crowd by bringing two "hot chicks" into the ring and getting them to dance. During a WWE Unlimited webcast the Heart Throbs were sitting with the fans and they ended up being on its "Kiss Cam" segment, each kissing a girl sitting near them.

Both Thomas and Roselli were released by WWE on February 10, 2006.

=== Return to the independent circuit (2006–2015) ===
Since their release, they have been active on the independent wrestling scene. They have spent time teaming together, as well as in solo competition, where each has a victory over the other, and two matches that were declared no contests. Together they have beaten such teams as The West Hollywood Blondes and Sex and Violence. They also wrestled former NWA World Tag Team Champions The Naturals, as well as 1-2-3 Kid and Marty Jannetty, and have even teamed with the Young Bucks in an 8-man tag team match. They lost to the Spirit Squad on January 17, 2015, XWA Extreme Rumble.

=== Total Nonstop Action Wrestling (2007) ===
Roselli and Thomas were backstage at Final Resolution, and wrestled the Riggs Brothers at the January 29, 2007 TNA television tapings. At Destination X on March 11, 2007, Roselli and Thomas, identified as "The Heartbreakers", appeared as a tag team selected by villainous manager Christy Hemme to face the Voodoo Kin Mafia (B.G. and Kip James). The Heartbreakers were defeated by the Voodoo Kin Mafia. They were released months later without ever appearing in TNA again.

== Championships and accomplishments ==
- Eastern Wrestling Alliance
  - EWA Tag Team Championship (1 time)
- Not Rated Pro Wrestling
  - NRPW World Tag Team Championship (1 time)
