= Backlash (2005) =

World Wrestling Entertainment pay-per-view event

- Promotional poster featuring Triple H
- Promotion: World Wrestling Entertainment
- Brand: Raw
- Date: May 1, 2005
- City: Manchester, New Hampshire
- Venue: Verizon Wireless Arena
- Attendance: 14,000
- Buy rate: 320,000

Pay-per-view chronology
← Previous; WrestleMania 21	Next → Judgment Day

Backlash chronology
← Previous; 2004	Next → 2006

The 2005 Backlash was a professional wrestling pay-per-view (PPV) event produced by World Wrestling Entertainment (WWE). It was the seventh annual Backlash and took place on May 1, 2005, at the Verizon Wireless Arena in Manchester, New Hampshire, held exclusively for wrestlers from the promotion's Raw brand division. The concept of the event was based around the backlash from WrestleMania 21.

In the main event, Batista defeated Triple H in a singles match to retain the World Heavyweight Championship. From the five scheduled bouts on the undercard, two received more promotion than the others. The first was a tag team match, in which Shawn Michaels and Hulk Hogan defeated Muhammad Hassan and Daivari. The other was a Last Man Standing match where Edge defeated Chris Benoit after Benoit failed to get to his feet before the referee's 10 count.

Backlash helped WWE increase its pay-per-view revenue by US$4.7 million, through ticket sales and pay-per-view buys.

== Production ==
=== Background ===
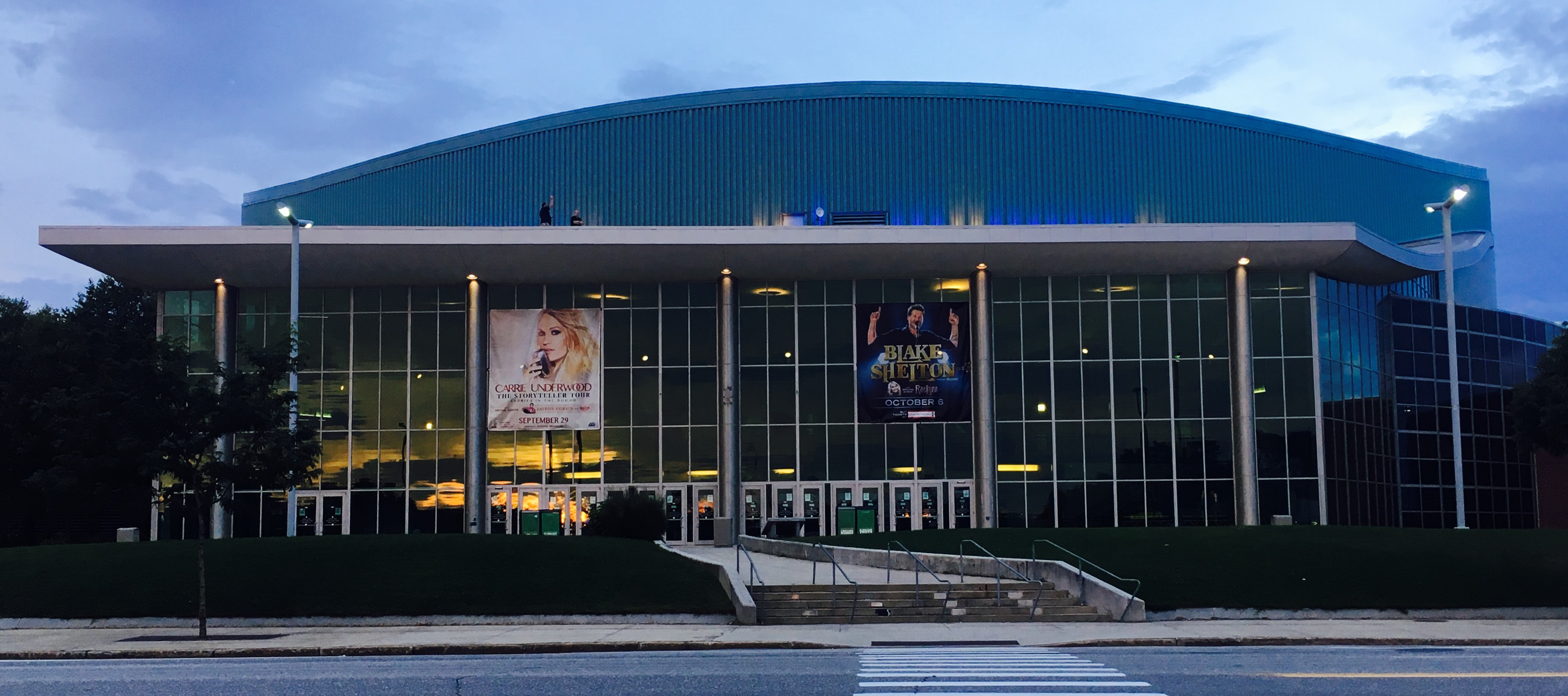
The event was held at the Verizon Wireless Arena in Manchester, New Hampshire.

Backlash is a professional wrestling pay-per-view (PPV) event that was established by World Wrestling Entertainment (WWE) in 1999. The concept is based around the backlash from WWE's flagship event, WrestleMania. The seventh event featured the backlash from WrestleMania 21 and was scheduled to take place on May 1, 2005, at the Verizon Wireless Arena in Manchester, New Hampshire. This was the first Backlash held in May, as all previous events were held in April. Like the previous year, the 2005 event exclusively featured wrestlers from the Raw brand division.

=== Storylines ===
The event featured six professional wrestling matches with different wrestlers involved in pre-existing scripted feuds, plots and storylines. All wrestlers belonged to the Raw brand – a storyline division in which WWE assigned its employees to a different program, the other being SmackDown!.

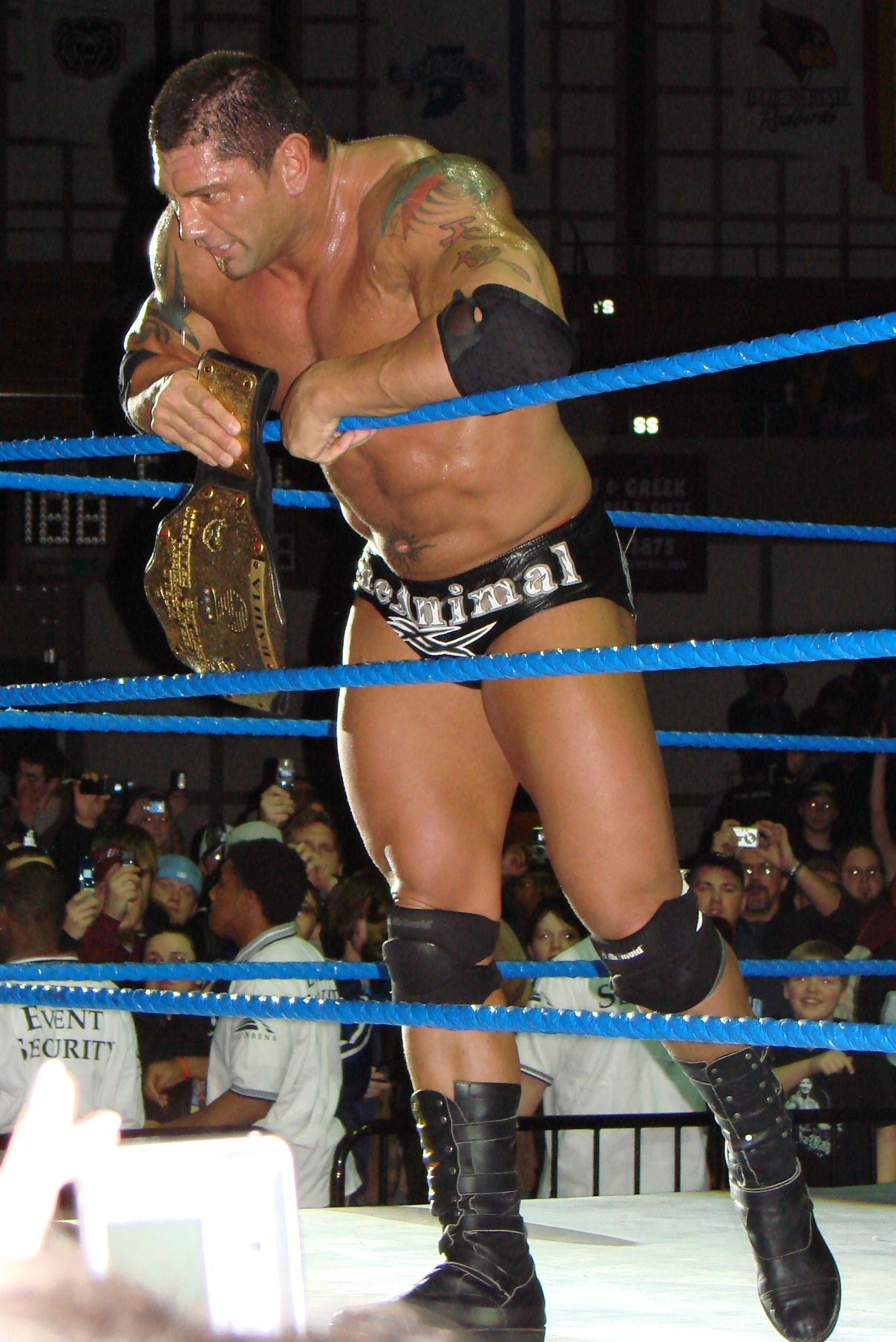
Batista as Raw's World Heavyweight Champion.

The main event at Backlash was a singles match for the World Heavyweight Championship, in which Batista defended the championship against Triple H. The buildup to the match began after WrestleMania 21, WWE's previous pay-per-view event, where Batista defeated Triple H to win the championship. On the April 11 episode of Raw, it was announced that Batista would defend the championship against Triple H at Backlash, after Triple H invoked his rematch clause. The following week, Triple H had a no disqualification match, a match where neither wrestler can be disqualified, allowing for weapons and outside interference, against Raw commentator Jim Ross, in which Ross won by pinfall after Batista interfered and hit Triple H in the head with a steel chair. On the April 25 episode of Raw, Batista defeated Christian in a singles match. After the match, Triple H assaulted Batista and hit the World Champion with a Pedigree.

The pay-per-view event featured the buildup of a rivalry among two tag teams, Shawn Michaels and Hulk Hogan versus Muhammad Hassan and Daivari. The night after WrestleMania, Michaels thanked the fans for their support towards him, despite Michaels losing at the event. Michaels continued, but was interrupted by Hassan and Daivari. Michaels, however, was in no mood to listen to Hassan's comments regarding Michaels' loss. As a result, Michaels slapped Hassan, which led to Hassan and Daivari to attack Michaels, leaving him unconscious in the ring. The following week, Michaels approached authority figure Eric Bischoff and demanded a handicap match with Hassan and Daivari. Bischoff refused to schedule the match, but informed Michaels to find a partner and he would grant him the match. Michaels then made a plea for Hulk Hogan to come back and team with him. On the April 18 episode of Raw, Hassan again led an attack on Michaels until Hogan appeared to save Michaels and accept his offer.

Another preliminary match was between Edge versus Chris Benoit in a Last Man Standing match. At WrestleMania, Edge won the first-ever Money in the Bank ladder match, gaining himself a contract for a World Heavyweight Championship match within one year. On the April 4 episode of Raw, Edge chose not to use his contract that night, deciding to wait until the right opportunity. When Edge declined to force Batista into a title defense, Eric Bischoff scheduled Edge in a match against Chris Benoit. Benoit won the match by pinfall after performing a roll-up. After the match, Edge attacked Benoit's injured arm with a steel chair. Two weeks later, Benoit and Edge faced off in another match, in which ended in a no-contest, leading to Bischoff to book the Last Man Standing match for Backlash. Other feuds that received less promotion and culminated into matches at Backlash include WWE Intercontinental Champion Shelton Benjamin versus Chris Jericho for the title, William Regal and Tajiri versus Rosey and The Hurricane versus The Heart Throbs (Antonio Thomas and Romeo Roselli) versus La Résistance (Sylvain Grenier and Robért Conway) in a tag team turmoil match for the World Tag Team Championship, and a singles match between Kane (accompanied by Lita) versus Viscera (accompanied by Trish Stratus).

== Event ==
Other on-screen personnel
Role:	Name:
English commentators	Jim Ross
English commentators	Jerry Lawler
Spanish commentators	Carlos Cabrera
Spanish commentators	Hugo Savinovich
Interviewers	Jonathan Coachman
Interviewers	Todd Grisham
Ring announcer	Lilian Garcia
Referees	Mike Chioda
Referees	Chad Patton
Referees	Earl Hebner
Referees	Jack Doan

Before the event aired live on pay-per-view, Tyson Tomko defeated Val Venis on Sunday Night Heat.

In the first match of the event, Shelton Benjamin faced Chris Jericho for the WWE Intercontinental Championship. When the match began, Benjamin had the upper hand. Benjamin then performed a springboard off the ropes, but Jericho countered with a hurricanrana off the ring apron to the floor. Jericho utilized a chinlock on Benjamin. Jericho then climbed to the top rope, but Benjamin stopped Jericho, leaping to the top rope and superplexing Jericho. Jericho then hit a running enzuigiri, but only got a near fall. Benjamin performed the T-Bone Suplex, but Jericho put his foot under the bottom rope to void the pin. Jericho locked in the Walls of Jericho, but Benjamin got to the rope. Jericho then locked in the Walls of Jericho again but Benjamin rolled-up Jericho to retain the Intercontinental Championship.

The next match was the Tag team turmoil match for the World Tag Team Championship. Tajiri and William Regal were the champions heading into the match. The teams would come out at random, and it was The Heart Throbs (Antonio and Romeo) who entered first, with the champions Tajiri and Regal coming out next. Tajiri utilized a lot of kicks and then locked in the Tarantula. The Heart Throbs then kept Tajiri isolated, but Tajiri pinned Antonio with a sunset flip. Simon Dean and Maven entered into the match next, trying to pick apart the weakened Tajiri. Their inclusion in the match did not last very long as Regal made the tag and cleaned house, putting Dean away with a knee to the head. La Résistance came in next, but Regal and Tajiri tried to fight back. Regal was then rolled up, with a handful of tights, eliminating him and Tajiri and guaranteeing new champions. The Hurricane and Rosey were the last two men to enter the match. The Hurricane was then smashed on the turnbuckle post. The Hurricane and Rosey got the pin when The Hurricane leapt off the shoulders of Rosey, who was perched on the top rope to grab the win.

The third match of the night was a Last Man Standing match between Edge and Chris Benoit. The match started out with Benoit getting the upper hand. Edge then got the upper hand by throwing Benoit sternum first into the turnbuckles. Benoit then applied the Sharpshooter on Edge. Benoit then performed multiple German suplexes on Edge, which sent Edge outside to the floor. Benoit dived through the ropes, but was met with a trash can lid to the face. Edge hit a superplex on Benoit through a trash can. Edge grabbed a ladder and dragged it into the ring, only to get a German suplex off of the ladder. Benoit missed a diving headbutt off the top of the ladder, Edge grabbed the Money in the Bank briefcase but was caught in the Crippler Crossface. Edge got out of the Crippler Crossface and performed an Edgecution on Benoit on the briefcase. Benoit reached his feet at nine, only to get speared by Edge. After spearing Benoit again, Edge pulled a brick out of his briefcase and hit Benoit in the back of his head, leaving Benoit unable to answer the ten count.

In the fourth match, Kane (accompanied by Lita) faced Viscera (accompanied by Trish Stratus). Kane's early attempts to take Viscera off his feet resulted in Kane being knocked down. Viscera then was clotheslined out of the ring by Kane. Trish tried to hit Kane with a steel chair, but Lita hit her with a crutch. Viscera then executed a Chokebomb on Kane, but only got a two count. Kane then came back and hit a big boot and a chokeslam to get the pinfall. Trish then verbally slammed Viscera, who responded by bear hugging and splashing Trish, who was then taken out on a stretcher.

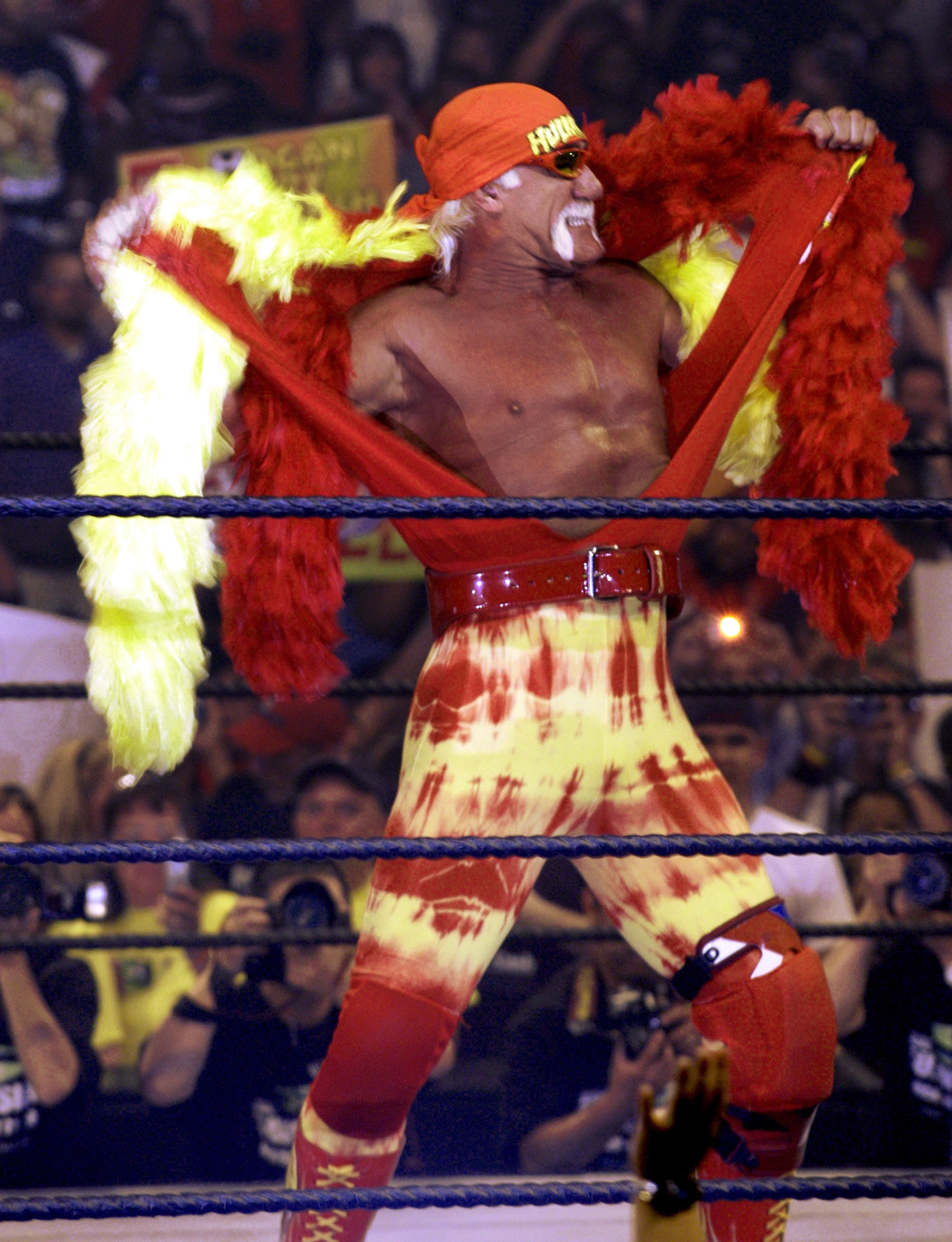
Hulk Hogan teamed up with Shawn Michaels to face Muhammad Hassan and Daivari.

In the fifth match, Hulk Hogan and Shawn Michaels faced Muhammad Hassan and Daivari. Hogan and Hassan began and Hassan was immediately sent into the turnbuckles. Hogan double clotheslined both his opponents and then he and Michaels teamed up with a big double boot to Hassan's face. Michaels climbed to the top rope but missed an elbow drop. Daivari was tossed outside where Hogan bashed him. Michaels hit Daivari with a flying forearm smash and a kip up. Michaels was about to hit Daivari with Sweet Chin Music, but instead Hassan hit Michaels with a lead pipe. Hassan then took advantage and locked Michaels in the Camel Clutch. Michaels fought his way to his feet and dropped Hassan with an Electric Chair. Hogan then got tagged in and went for a leg drop to Daivari, but Hassan hit Hogan with a lead pipe instead. As the referee had his back turned at Hogan, Michaels hit Daivari with Sweet Chin Music allowing Hogan to get the pinfall and win the match for his team.

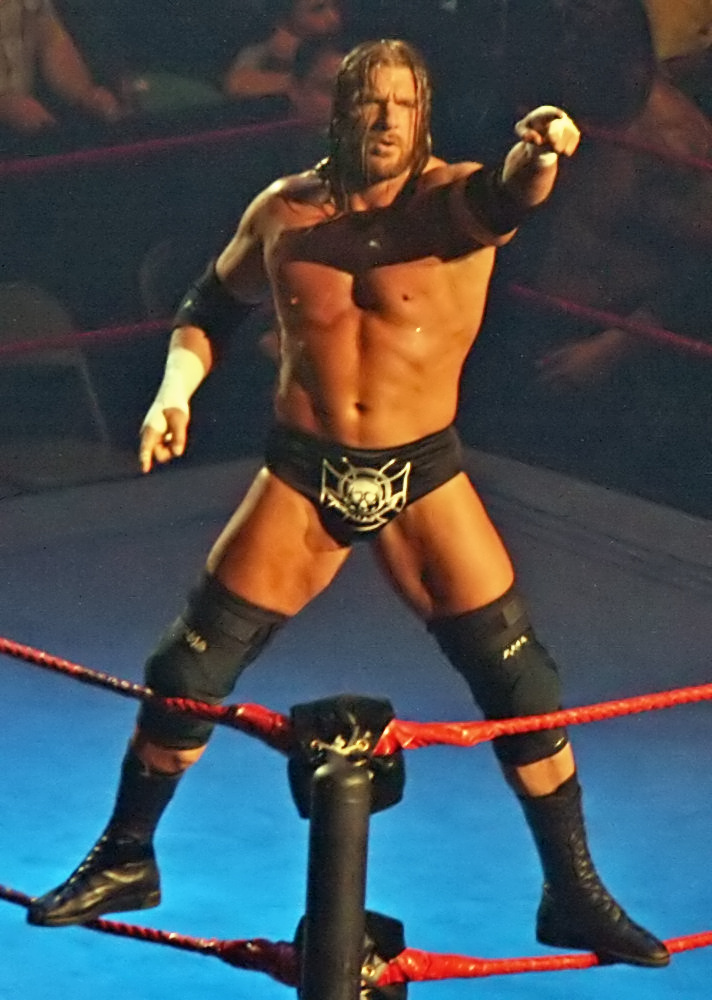
Triple H challenged Batista for Raw's World Heavyweight Championship.

The main event was for the World Heavyweight Championship between champion Batista and Triple H (accompanied by Ric Flair). In the opening seconds, Flair grabbed Batista's leg, providing the distraction necessary for Triple H to attack Batista and gain an early advantage. Both men attempted to hit their finishers early on, but both attempts failed. Triple H went for another Pedigree attempt, but was backdropped over the top rope to the floor. Batista returned to the ring and walked into a spinebuster for a two count. Batista then went for a Batista Bomb, but Triple H hit Batista in the head with the championship belt. Batista performed a spinebuster on Triple H, but there was no referee to make the pin. Jack Doan then ran down and made the pin, but only got a two count. A second Batista Bomb attempt was stopped with a low blow by Triple H. Triple H then backed Batista into a corner and punched him ten times. Batista then performed another Batista Bomb to win the match and retain the championship. After the match, Triple H pedigreed referee Mike Chioda, while Batista celebrated on the entrance ramp.

== Reception ==
The Verizon Wireless Arena usually can accommodate 11,000, but the capacity was increased for the event. This event grossed over $700,000 from an approximate attendance of 14,000 which was the maximum allowed. Backlash helped WWE earn $21.6 million in revenue from pay-per-view events versus $16.9 million the previous year, which was later confirmed by Linda McMahon, the CEO of WWE, on September 7, 2005, in a quarterly result. Canadian Online Explorer's professional wrestling section rated the event six out of 10. The rating was higher than the Backlash 2006 event, which was marked as a "complete disaster". The World title match was rated a seven out of 10. Additionally, the Intercontinental title match between Shelton Benjamin and Chris Jericho was rated seven out of ten, the last man standing match between Edge and Chris Benoit was rated six out of ten and the tag team match of Shawn Michaels and Hulk Hogan and Muhammad Hassan and Khosrow Daivari was rated five out of ten.

== Aftermath ==
The next night on Raw, General Manager Eric Bischoff held a Gold Rush Tournament to determine who would be the number one contender for the World Heavyweight Championship. The matches were Kane versus Christian, Shawn Michaels versus Shelton Benjamin, Edge versus Chris Jericho, and Chris Benoit versus Triple H. Kane, Michaels, Edge, and Benoit all advanced to the next round. The next week, Edge faced Michaels and Kane faced Benoit. Edge and Kane advanced to the finals. One week later, the finals took place between Edge and Kane. Edge won the tournament after Lita helped Edge win. One week later, Edge faced Batista for the World Heavyweight Championship. Batista won the match by pinfall after executing a Batista Bomb. Edge then started a feud with Kane, which lasted until Kane defeated him at Vengeance.

The next night on Raw, Triple H and Batista verbally taunted each other. Three weeks later, after Batista's world title match against Edge, Triple H then came out with a sledgehammer and Ric Flair attacked Batista with a low blow, leading to Batista being attacked by Triple H. Afterward, Triple H told Batista that they were going to face each other again at Vengeance in a Hell in a Cell match and performed a Pedigree on Batista onto the title. At Vengeance, Batista retained the title against Triple H. In June, Batista was drafted to SmackDown! in the 2005 WWE Draft Lottery, which, as a result, ended the rivalry.

== Results ==
No.	Results	Stipulations	Times
1^{H}	Tyson Tomko defeated Val Venis by pinfall	Singles match	5:40
2	Shelton Benjamin (c) defeated Chris Jericho by pinfall	Singles match for the WWE Intercontinental Championship	14:31
3	Rosey and The Hurricane won by last eliminating La Résistance (Robért Conway and Sylvain Grenier) by pinfall	Tag team turmoil match for the World Tag Team Championship	13:43
4	Edge defeated Chris Benoit	Last Man Standing match	18:47
5	Kane (with Lita) defeated Viscera (with Trish Stratus) by pinfall	Singles match	6:09
6	Hulk Hogan and Shawn Michaels defeated Daivari and Muhammad Hassan by pinfall	Tag team match	15:05
7	Batista (c) defeated Triple H (with Ric Flair) by pinfall	Singles match for the World Heavyweight Championship	16:23
(c) / – the champion(s) heading into the match; H / – the match was broadcast prior to the pay-per-view on Sunday Night Heat

=== Tag team turmoil match ===
Draw	Wrestler	Order	Eliminated by
2	Tajiri and William Regal (c)	3	La Résistance
1	The Heart Throbs (Antonio and Romeo)	1	Tajiri and William Regal
3	Simon Dean and Maven	2	Tajiri and William Regal
4	La Résistance (Robért Conway and Sylvain Grenier)	4	The Hurricane and Rosey
5	The Hurricane and Rosey	Winners	N/A
