= Antonio Thomas (wrestler) =

American wrestler (born 1978)

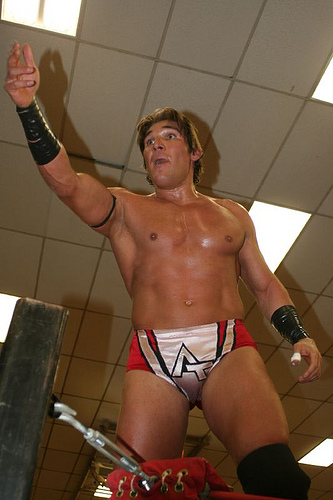

Personal information
- Born: Thomas Matera; December 13, 1978 (age 47) Springfield, Massachusetts, U.S.

Professional wrestling career
- Ring name(s): Antonio Thomas; Antonio; Promise Thomas; Thomas Santell; The Promise
- Billed height: 6 ft 1 in (1.85 m)
- Billed weight: 235 lb (107 kg)
- Billed from: Humboldt, Iowa
- Trained by: Lance Storm; Kevin Landry; Steve Bradley; Jeff Costa; Killer Kowalski; Ohio Valley Wrestling
- Debut: September 2001
- Retired: 2025

Thomas Matera (born December 13, 1978) is an American professional wrestler and personal trainer, better known by his ring name Antonio Thomas. He is best known for his stint with World Wrestling Entertainment on the Raw brand as one half of The Heart Throbs under the ring name Antonio.

== Professional wrestling career ==
=== Early career (2001–2004) ===
Matera made his debut in late 2001 under the name Antonio Thomas, and quickly became a mainstay on the New England independent circuit. Over the next few years, he wrestled for several promotions, including New England Championship Wrestling, Chaotic Wrestling, and the Eastern Wrestling Alliance (EWA).

In early 2003, Thomas began training with Rick Harrison, and began working for Bradley's Wrestling Federation of America (WFA) promotion. There he won the WFA Heavyweight Championship, and held it throughout most of 2003–2004.

Thomas then began teaming with his long-time friend Romeo Roselli, who was wrestling as Johnny Heartbreaker, and the pair formed a tag team called The Heartbreakers. On January 23, 2004, The Heartbreakers defeated Cueball and Nick McKenna to become the EWA Tag Team Champions.

=== World Wrestling Entertainment (2004–2006) ===
In July 2004, Thomas signed a developmental contract with World Wrestling Entertainment (WWE) and was sent to Ohio Valley Wrestling (OVW). In OVW he continued to team with Heartbreaker, but it was not until February 2005 that Heartbreaker was officially signed to a developmental contract with WWE.

On April 18, 2005, William Regal and Tajiri successfully defended the World Tag Team Championships against the debuting Heart Throbs (Thomas and Heartbreaker, now known simply as Antonio and Romeo respectively). They went on to participate in a Tag Team Turmoil match for the World Tag Team Championship at the 2005 Backlash pay-per-view, although they were unsuccessful.

The Heart Throbs, who have portrayed heels, mainly appeared on the Raw B-show, Heat. They had short-lived feuds with Eugene and William Regal, The Hurricane and Rosey, and V-Squared (Val Venis and Viscera).

During the first episode of Heat in 2006 the pair turned face and began educating the crowd by bringing two "hot chicks" into the ring and getting them to read a book.

On February 10, 2006, WWE announced that The Heart Throbs had been released from their contracts.

=== Independent circuit (2006–present) ===
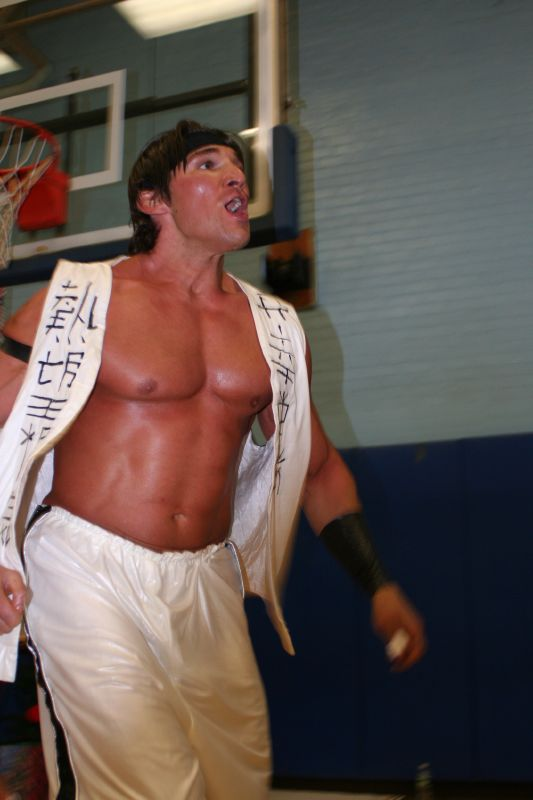
Thomas in 2008

After his release from WWE, Thomas returned to working on the New England independent circuit.

On May 27, 2006, Thomas debuted for MXW and pinned Jason Blade after the match was interrupted by Romeo Roselli. At InterPromotional Incident on July 8, 2006, Thomas and Blade defeated the team of Roselli and Xavier. On November 10, 2006, Thomas wrestled Claudio Castagnoli in one half of the main event at Capital Collision in Albany, NY. His most recent appearance for MXW was at Brass City Battle on November 12, 2006, where he took on Slyk Wagner Brown. In June 2007, Thomas toured Italy with the Nu-Wrestling Evolution promotion.

On February 22, 2009, Thomas competed in a dark match for Ring of Honor, teaming with Prince Jaleel in a loss to Andy Ridge and Alex Payne. In May 2009, Thomas won the NECW Iron 8 Tournament.

On July 28, 2012, The Heart Throbs made their debut for Chikara, teaming with The Young Bucks (Matt and Nick Jackson) in an eight-man tag team match, where they were defeated by Hallowicked, Jigsaw, Mike Quackenbush and UltraMantis Black. The Heart Throbs returned to the promotion on November 18, losing to 1-2-3 Kid and Marty Jannetty in a tag team match.

On February 1, 2013, Thomas captured the vacant NECW Heavyweight Championship, defeating Johnny Thunder at NECW Snowbrawl. The championship was vacated in the first place due to the previous title holder, Sean Burke, breaking his ankle during an NECW title defense with Antonio Thomas. Thomas and Burke would end in a time limit draw that night. he took a haitus from wrestling from 2019 to 2022.

In recent years, he has wrestled for the Worcester, Massachusetts promotion, Beyond Wrestling.

=== Total Nonstop Action Wrestling (2007) ===
On March 11, 2007, Thomas and Roselli appeared at Total Nonstop Action Wrestling's Destination X pay-per-view as Christy Hemme's mystery team. Renamed "The Heartbreakers", they lost to The Voodoo Kin Mafia (B.G. James and Kip James).

=== Japan (2008, 2010) ===
Thomas has wrestled for All Japan Pro Wrestling. Thomas and Akebono were defeated by Rene Dupree and Big Daddy Voodoo. Ryota Hama, Masayuki Kono and Shuji Kondo defeated Masakatsu Funaki, Akebono and Antonio Thomas.

=== Italy (2012) ===
On September 12, 2012, he has been nominated as head trainer for the Italian promotion Rome Wrestling Academy.

== Other media ==
Matera appeared on the September 7, 2008 edition of Sox Appeal. He was on the wrestling observer live show.

== Personal life ==
Matera is a certified personal trainer, and plans to obtain a Master's degree in Exercise Science and Strength and Conditioning. He grew up in Ludlow, Massachusetts and attended Ludlow High School, after attending Birchland Park Middle School in East Longmeadow, Massachusetts. As of 2020, he was married on 10/31/2020 and living in Worcester, Massachusetts.

== Championships and accomplishments ==
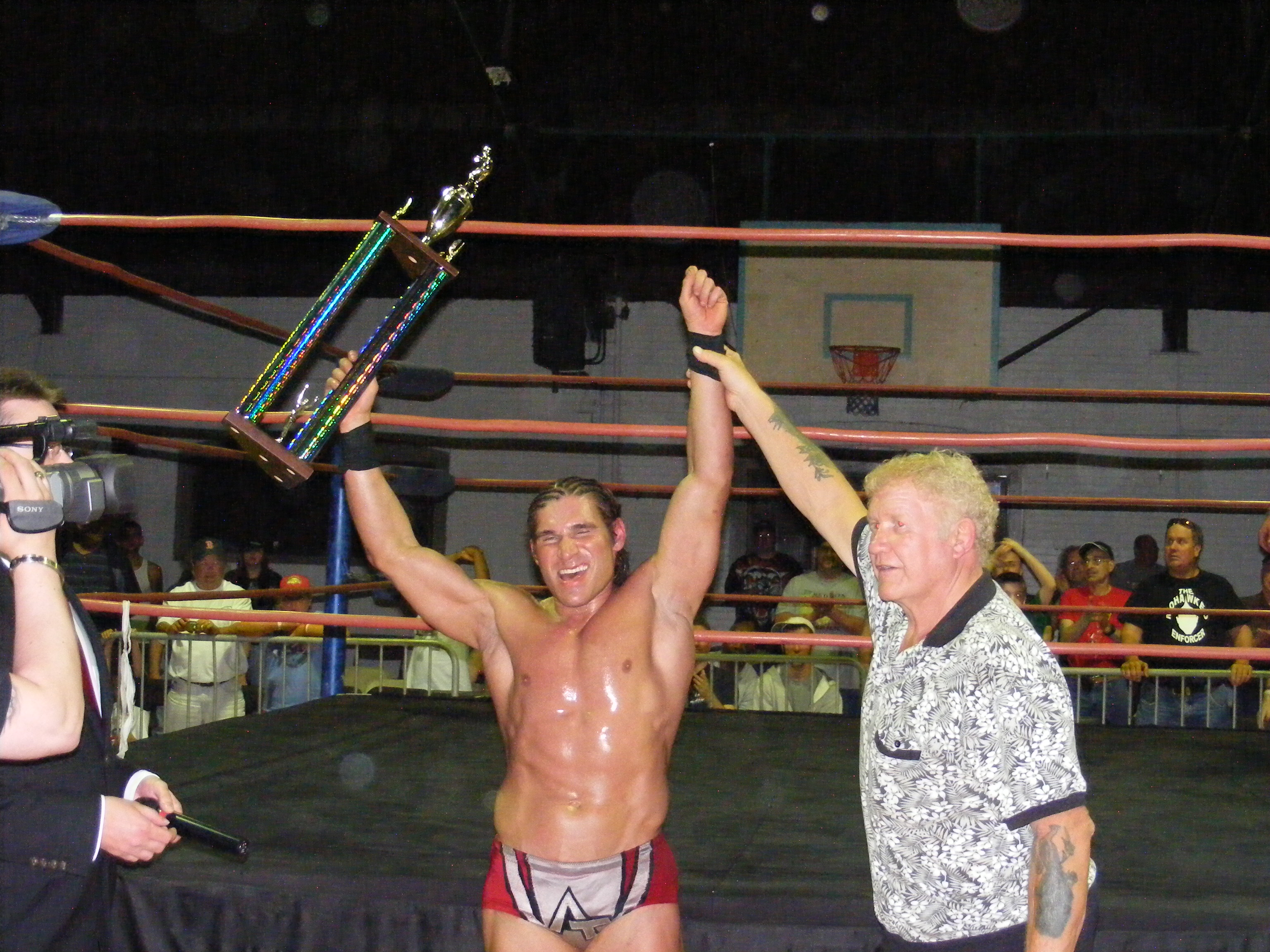
Thomas after winning the NECW Iron 8 tournament in May 2009

- CyberSpace Wrestling Federation
  - CSWF Tag Team Championship (1 time) - with Aaron Morrison
- Eastern Wrestling Alliance
  - EWA Heavyweight Championship (1 time)
  - EWA New England Heavyweight Championship (1 time)
  - EWA Tag Team Championship (1 time) - with Johnny Heartbreaker
- Green Mountain Wrestling
  - GMW Tag Team Championship (1 time)
- New England Championship Wrestling
  - NECW Tag Team Championship (1 time) - with Chad Storm
  - Iron 8 Tournament (2009)
  - NECW Heavyweight Championship (1 time)
- New England Pro Wrestling Hall of Fame
  - Class of 2019
- No Limit Pro Wrestling
  - NWA Liberty States Heavyweight Championship (1 time)
- Wrestling Federation of America
  - WFA Heavyweight Championship (1 time)
