= Urge =

An urge is a desire. It may also refer to:

== Entertainment ==
- The Urge (1987–2005), St. Louis, Missouri, USA Rock/Ska band
- The Urge (album), a 1991 album released by bassist Stuart Hamm
- Urge (album), a 1966 album by American trumpeter Ted Curson
- "Urge" (song), the second and last single released from Endless Nameless album by The Wildhearts
- Urge (digital music service), a defunct online music service
- Urge (film), a 2016 film
- "Urges", 9th episode of season 2 of Space Ghost Coast to Coast

== Other uses ==
- HMS Urge, a 1940 lost World War II British submarine
- Nissan URGE, a concept car announced by Nissan that will be integrated with the Xbox video game console
- Urge (drink), a citrus soft drink produced in Norway, equivalent of Surge
- Urge, Pärnu County, Estonia
- Urge, Rapla County, Estonia

== See also ==
- The Sinister Urge (disambiguation)
- Urgent (disambiguation)
- Urgency (disambiguation)
