= Gravity Gets Things Done =

Studio album by The Pale Pacific
- Released: November 4, 2003
- Genre: Indie rock Power pop
- Length: 51:03
- Label: SideCho Records

The Pale Pacific chronology
Another Innovative Idea for the People on the Go (2001)	Gravity Gets Things Done (2003)	Urgency (2005)

Gravity Gets Things Done is the third album by Bellingham, Washington indie rock band The Pale Pacific (formerly The Pale).

== Track listing ==
1. "Space to Move" – 3:58
2. "Gravity Gets Things Done" – 3:54
3. "How to Fit In" – 3:25
4. "Reasons to Try" – 2:46
5. "The Crash" – 4:32
6. "Wake-Up Call" – 4:09
7. "Big Dumb Smile" – 3:10
8. "Relativity" – 4:24
9. "Trash" – 4:50
10. "Fixed on a Pattern" – 2:57
11. "We Never Fight or Disagree" – 4:12
12. "Stop/Start" – 8:52

== Reception ==
Professional ratings
Review scores
Source	Rating
AllMusic	3/5 stars
Punknews.org	3.5/5 stars

Johnny Loftus of AllMusic said Gravity Gets Things Done was an album made to please listeners and not impress them. Alternatively, Punk News recommended the album for listeners wanting an album that had catchy music and lyrics with a personal connection.
