= Bentley EXP 12 Speed 6e =

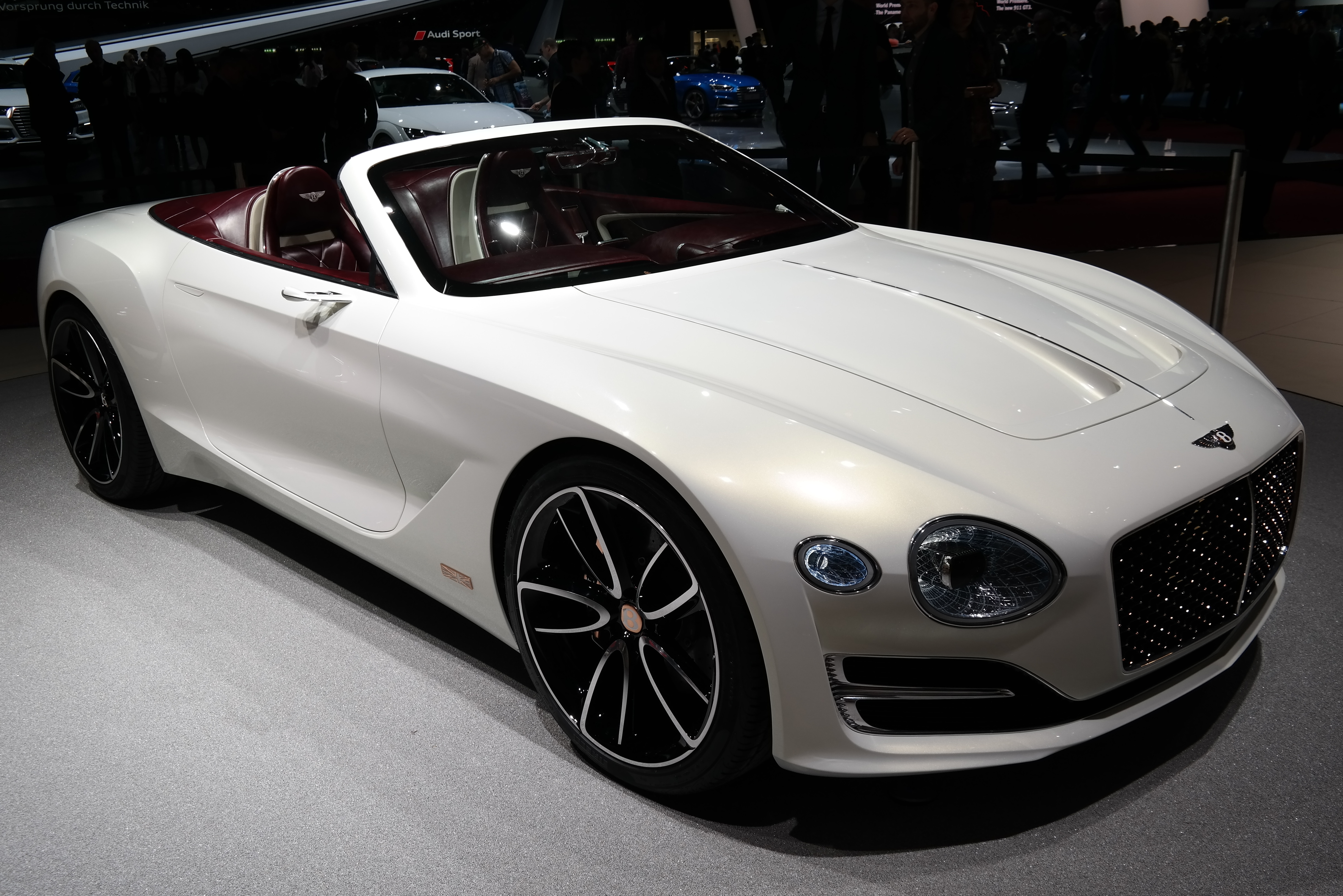
- The Bentley EXP 12 Speed 6e concept at the 2017 Geneva Motor Show

Overview
- Manufacturer: Bentley Motors Limited
- Production: 2017 (concept car)
- Assembly: Crewe, England, United Kingdom (Bentley Crewe)
- Designer: Stefan Sielaff

Body and chassis
- Class: Battery electric grand tourer (S)
- Body style: 2-door cabriolet
- Layout: Dual-motor, four-wheel drive
- Doors: Swan doors
- Related: Bentley Bentayga, Bentley EXP 10 Speed 6

Powertrain
- Electric motor: 2 Permanent Magnet Motors Synchronous Motor
- Power output: 455 brake horsepower (339 kW); 679 pound force-feet (921 N⋅m) (Projected)
- Transmission: Single-speed automatic
- Electric range: 472 to 489 km (293 to 304 mi)
- Plug-in charging: Plug in/inductive charging

The Bentley EXP 12 Speed 6e is a fully electric two-door cabriolet created and unveiled by Bentley at the 2017 Geneva International Motor Show.

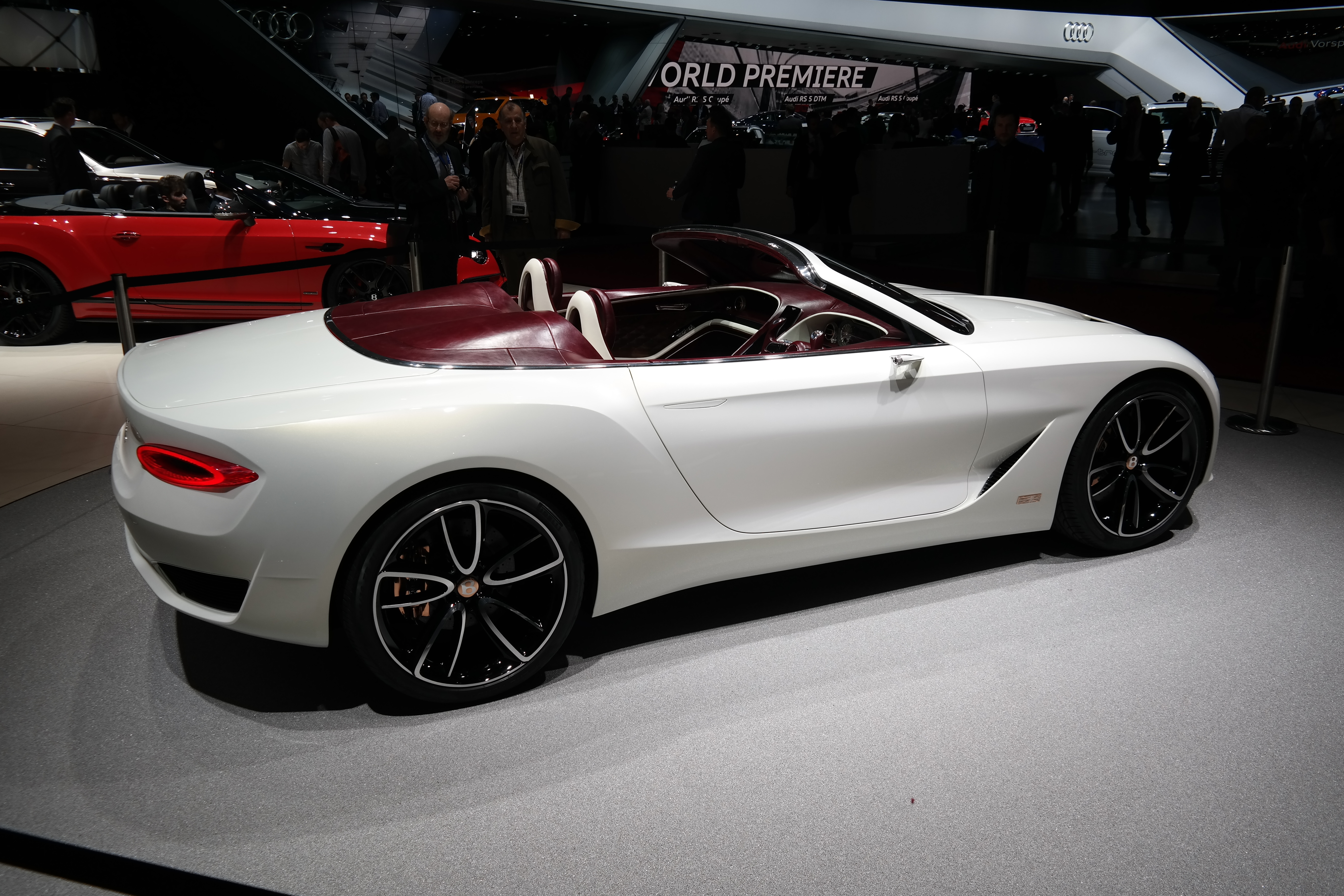
Rear view

== Overview ==
Wolfgang Dürheimer, the chairman and chief executive of Bentley Motors, said that the concept is meant to gauge consumer interest, while showing Bentleys’ commitment to including a fully electric option in the company's line-up, that is as capable as other models. “The [6e] is a concept to show that Bentley is defining electric motoring in the luxury sector, with the appropriate technology, high-quality materials and refinement levels you’d expect from a true Bentley” Dürheimer stated. “Bentley is committed to offering an electric model in its future portfolio and we are interested to receive feedback on this concept,” Dürheimer concluded.

== Design ==
=== Exterior ===
The exterior of the EXP12 Speed 6e is meant to reflect an evolution of Bentleys’ design thinking. The design is similar to the Bentley EXP 10 Speed 6, and is inspired by contemporary architecture, nature, and the aerodynamic shapes of aircraft fuselages. The concept features a long hood, short overhangs, low mesh grille, and a wide rear. The hood has scoops that take in air to cool the battery and drivetrain. It has small side cameras that replace conventional exterior mirrors for a smaller, more aerodynamic design, and an illuminated “6e” that appears in the grille when the car is on. Throughout the design are copper highlights, meant to emphasize the electric nature of the concept. The concept was made to look muscular and athletic, while remaining reserved.

=== Interior ===
The interior also borrows heavily from the EXP 10 Speed 6 concept, featuring a mixture of wood veneers, red leather, and copper accents. The yoke-style steering wheel has cut-glass sections that have controls for infotainment and navigation functions, while two other buttons on the steering wheel gives a performance boost (a "push-to-pass function") or regulates the speed of the car. The center console features a large curved glass high-definition OLED touchscreen display, which controls much of the onboard functions, like climate, navigation, and entertainment. The Bentley Dynamic Drive dial allows the driver to change various systems within the car. The passenger side of the dashboard has a secondary control panel, allowing passengers to access e-mail, social media, and other functions.

== Technology ==
The concept has a few young technologies that it brings to the market. Traditional side-mirrors are replaced with cameras. The concept has an intelligent infotainment system that can access many services using car-connected apps. Bentley also wants to offer on board concierge-style services for the driver. The concept would also feature inductive charging, making charging more convenient and rapid. However, in the event that inductive charging isn't available, the car can use a charging port located behind the rear license plate.

== Specifications ==
Bentley expects the concept to have high levels of immediate torque and power, combined with high range. The concept is expected to be able to travel from London to Paris or Milan to Monaco on a single charge, giving the concept an electric range between 293 and 304 miles.
