= Urgent =

Urgent may refer to:

- Urgent (American band), a 1980s band from New York City
- Urgent (Canadian band), a 1980s band from Toronto, Ontario, Canada
- "Urgent" (song), a 1981 song by Foreigner
- Urgent! Records, a former record company

== See also ==
- Urge (disambiguation)
- Urgency (disambiguation)
- Urgenta, 3468 Urgenta, minor planets
- Urgenda (portmanteau of urgent and agenda), Dutch NGO
