= Emergent =

Emergent may refer to:

- Emergent (album), a 2003 album by Gordian Knot
- Emergent (software), Neural Simulation Software
- Emergent BioSolutions, a multinational biopharmaceutical company headquartered in Gaithersburg, Maryland, USA
- Emergent Labs, a software company in San Francisco
- Emergent properties, when simple entities interact to produce more complex ones
- Any of the group of trees growing above the canopy in a rainforest

== See also ==
- Emergence (disambiguation)
- Emergentism
