= Emergence (disambiguation) =

Emergence is the process of complex pattern formation from more basic constituent parts.

== Literature ==
- Emergence (Palmer novel), a 1984 science fiction book by David R. Palmer
- Emergence (Birmingham novel), a 2015 novel by John Birmingham
- Emergence (C. J. Cherryh novel), a 2018 science fiction novel by C. J. Cherryh
- Emergence: The Connected Lives of Ants, Brains, Cities, and Software, a 2001 book by Steven Berlin Johnson
- Emergence: Labeled Autistic, a 1986 book by Temple Grandin
- Emergence, a science fiction book by Ray Hammond
- Metamorphosis (also known as Emergence), a 2016 pornographic manga

== Music ==
- Emergence (Miroslav Vitouš album), 1985
- Émergence (Natasha St-Pier album), 1996
- Emergence (Neil Sedaka album), 1971
- Emergence, a 1992 album by R. Carlos Nakai
- Emergence (Roy Hargrove album), 2009
- Emergence (Whit Dickey album), 2009
- Emergence: The Music of TNA Wrestling, the fifth studio album of TNA Wrestling
- "Emergence" (song), a 2025 single by Sleep Token from Even in Arcadia

== Other ==
- Emergence (Star Trek: The Next Generation), a 1994 Star Trek: The Next Generation episode
- Emergence International, a worldwide community of Christian Scientists
- The process of return to baseline physiologic function of all organ systems after the cessation of general anaesthesia
- Emergence (TV series), a 2019 American drama series
- Impact Wrestling Emergence, an annual professional wrestling event held by Impact Wrestling
- Emergence (sculpture), a 1981 bronze sculpture by Don Eckland
- Emergence (anthropology), the process whereby ethnic groups come into being

== See also ==
- Emergency (disambiguation)
- Emergent (disambiguation)
- Emergentism, an approach to philosophy of complex systems
