= Vencer Sarthe =

Overview
- Manufacturer: Vencer
- Model years: 2015–present
- Assembly: Vriezenveen, Netherlands

Body and chassis
- Class: Sports car (S)
- Layout: RMR layout
- Doors: Swan doors
- Chassis: Hybrid space frame with honeycomb structure

Powertrain
- Engine: 6.3 L V63SC supercharged V8
- Transmission: 6-speed manual

Dimensions
- Wheelbase: 2,791 mm (109.9 in)
- Length: 4,515 mm (177.8 in)
- Width: 1,984 mm (78.1 in)
- Height: 1,190 mm (46.9 in)
- Curb weight: 1,390 kg (3,064 lb)

The Vencer Sarthe is a Dutch sports car produced by Vencer. It is the first automobile to be produced by Vencer.

== History ==
At the Top Marques auto show in 2013, Prince Albert II of Monaco revealed a prototype of the Vencer Sarthe. The first Vencer Sarthe was sold at a Vencer dealership in China.

== Performance ==
The Sarthe uses a 6.3-liter V8 engine. It has a power output of 622 bhp (464 kW; 631 PS) and a torque output of 618 lb-ft (838 Nm). The car can go from 0 to 100 km/h (62 mph) in 3.6 seconds and has a top speed of 338 km/h (210 mph).

== Design ==
The Sarthe was inspired by the 1980s 24 Hours of Le Mans racecars. It has an 'automatic' rear spoiler and carbon fiber bodywork made in the Netherlands at the Vencer factory. All of the panels on the inside of the car are constructed of carbon fiber.

== Media appearances ==
- Asphalt 8: Airborne
- Asphalt Legends Unite
