= The Pale Pacific =

American indie rock/powerpop band

- Origin: Seattle, Washington
- Genres: Indie rock; power pop
- Years active: 1994–present
- Labels: Always Never Records; SideCho; Sleeping Industries
- Members: Gabe Archer; Justin Harcus; Cameron Nicklaus; Greg Swinehart
- Past members: Ben Parsons; Seth Carey; Jared Archer; Ryan Worsley; Lance Fisher; Nate Beede
- Website: www.thepalepacific.com

The Pale Pacific, formerly The Pale, is an indie rock/power pop band from Bellingham, Washington. The Pale Pacific began as a collaboration between Gabe Archer and his cousin Cameron Nicklaus, with Archer on piano/keyboards and Nicklaus on drums.

== Discography ==
- First Attempt at World Domination (1997) - Always Never Records
- Another Innovative Idea for the People on the Go (2001) - Always Never Records
- Gravity Gets Things Done (2003) - Always Never Records, (2004) - SideCho Records
- The Pale/Copeland split EP (2003) - SideCho Records
- Rules Are Predictable EP (2005) - SideCho Records
- Urgency (2005) - SideCho Records
- There Is a Cover Song EP (2010) - Released as a free download
- There Is a Song Headed Straight for Your Face (2010) - Recorded live at The Crocodile on August 11, 2007

== Also appeared on ==
¡Policia!: A Tribute to the Police (2005) (As The Pale) - Walking on the Moon
Live From the Morning Alternative Vol. 2, The End 107.7 (2005) - Gravity Gets Things Done (Live Acoustic)

== Band members ==
=== Current ===
- Gabe Archer – lead vocals, guitar, keyboard (1994–present)
- Cameron Nicklaus – guitar (1994–present)
- Justin Harcus – bass (2005–present)
- Greg Swinehart – drums, background vocals (2000–present)

=== Past ===
- Jared Archer – bass, guitar (1998–2001)
- Lance Fisher – bass (2002)
- Ryan Worsley – bass (2003–2004)
- Nate Beede – guitar (2003)
