= Urgency =

Urgency may refer to:

- Pan-pan, international radio calls for emergencies posing no imminent danger
- Urinary urgency or Bowel urgency (fecal urgency), medical symptoms
- Urgency (Low Level Flight album), 2007
- Urgency (The Pale Pacific album), 2005
- The Urgency, an album by Saving Grace, 2014

== See also ==
- Emergency (disambiguation)
