= Swan doors =

Type of car door that swings both up and outwards

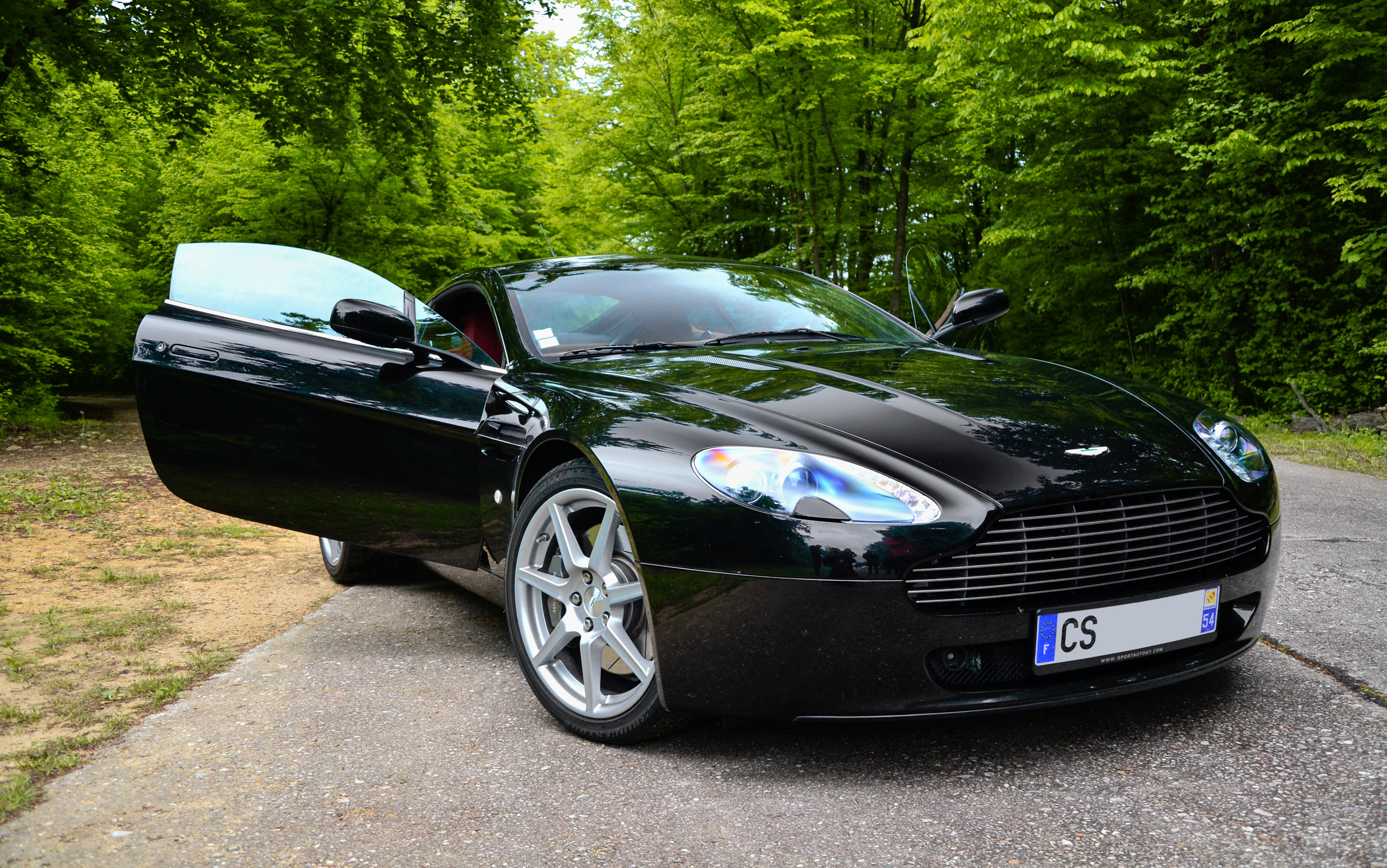
Aston Martin V8 Vantage with swan doors

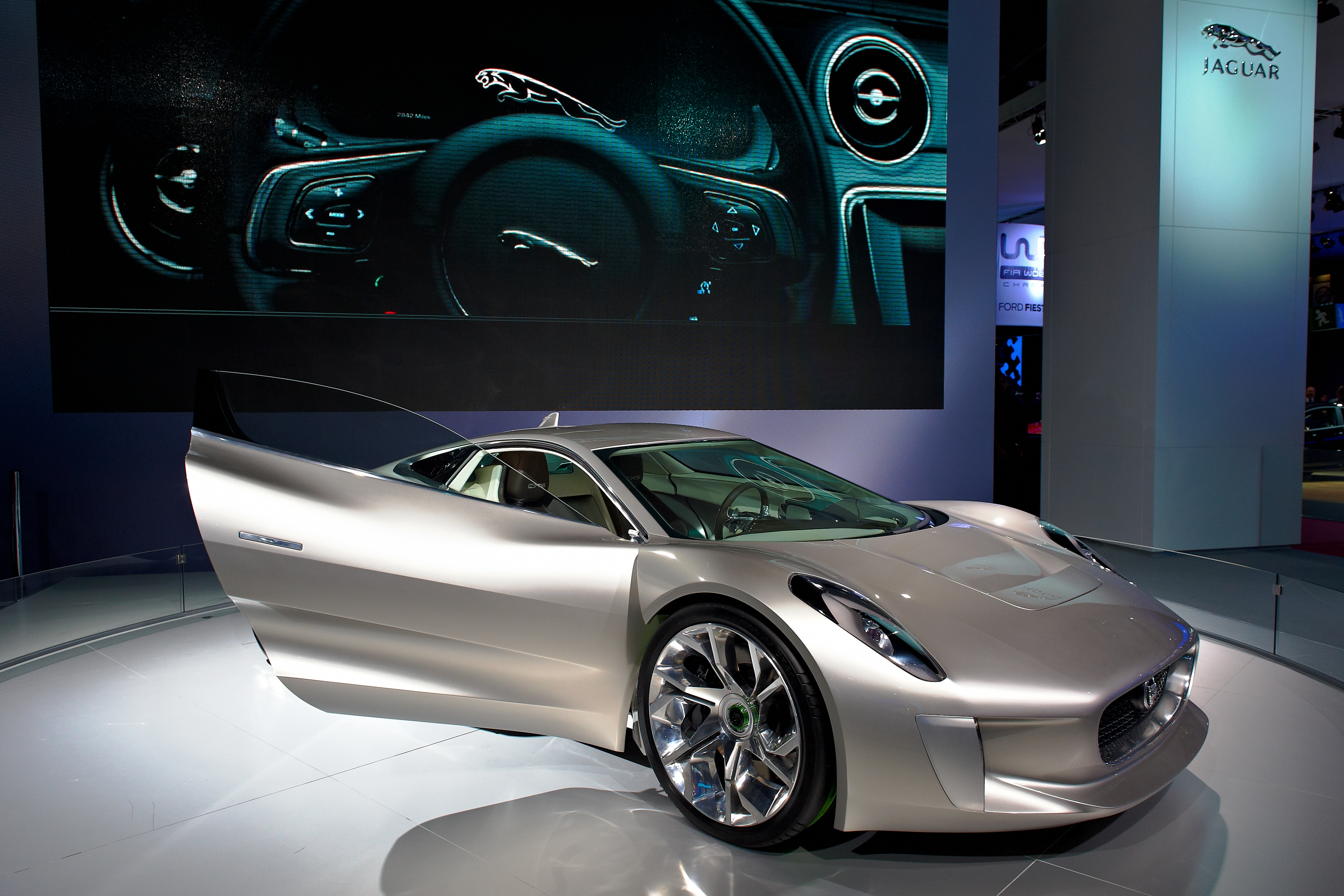
Jaguar C-X75 concept with right side swan door open

Swan doors or swan-wing doors are a type of door typically used on performance cars or concept cars. Swan doors operate in a similar way to conventional car doors, but they open at an upward angle.

== Function ==
The design helps to clear curbs, especially on lower sports cars, by opening slightly upward and away from the curb. The name comes from their resemblance when open to a swan with its wings open. Although there is no formal definition, swan doors are generally considered to be different from butterfly or scissor doors as they are hinged below the A pillar, open both upward and outward, and do not tilt outward like butterfly doors.

== Usage ==
The best-known usage of swan doors is by Aston Martin, and their sister company Lagonda, who have used the design on many of their models, starting with the DB9 in 2004. A number of cars from other manufacturers have also used the design, such as the Hennessey Venom GT and Vencer Sarthe. Some concept cars have used swan doors as well, including the Bentley EXP 10 Speed 6 and EXP 12 Speed 6e, Nissan URGE, and Lamborghini Asterion.

== See also ==
- Canopy door
- Gull-wing door
- List of cars with non-standard door designs
- Scissor doors
- Sliding doors
- Suicide door
