= State of Emergency (disambiguation) =

A state of emergency is where a government enacts extraordinary policies for the safety of their citizens.

State of emergency may also refer to:

== Films ==
- State of Emergency (1994 film), an American drama
- State of Emergency (2004 film), a Nigerian action movie
- State of Emergency (2011 film), an American horror film

== Music ==
- State of Emergency (Steel Pulse album), 1988
- State of Emergency (The Living End album), 2006
- State of Emergency (Dalmatian EP), 2012
- State of Emergency (Lil Tjay EP), 2020
- Bill Cosby Presents the Cosnarati: State of Emergency, an album by Bill Cosby, 2009
- The Product III: State of Emergency, an album by August Alsina, 2020
- "State of Emergency", a song by Logic from the 2018 album Bobby Tarantino II

== Other uses ==
- State of Emergency (book), by Patrick Buchanan, 2006
- State of Emergency (video game), 2002
- Death Before Dishonor X: State of Emergency, a 2012 professional wrestling internet pay-per-view event

== See also ==
- Emergency (disambiguation)
- Snow emergency, the active response plan to a snow storm
