= Dale Oliver =

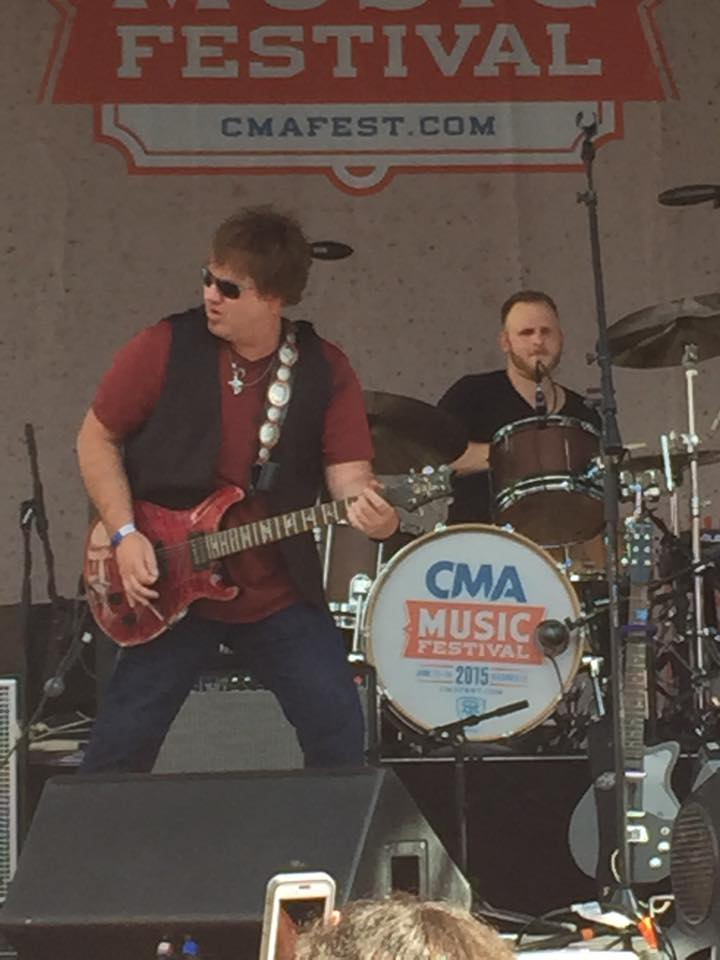
- Oliver at 2015 CMA Music Festival in Nashville, Tennessee

Background information
- Origin: United States
- Genres: CCM; Christian rock; country; Professional wrestling theme music; alternative rock
- Occupation: Musician
- Instruments: Guitar; dobro; mandolin
- Years active: 1992–present

Dale Oliver is an American music composer, guitarist and producer, who is signed to TNA, where he is the head of TNA Knockout Music. Oliver was formerly a guitarist for the American country music group Blackhawk, Reba McEntire, Steven Curtis Chapman and Geoff Moore and the Distance.

== Career ==
Oliver toured and recorded with Geoff Moore and the Distance as their guitarist for 6 years and cowrote 11 songs with Moore during this time. He was nominated for rock song of the year for "A Place to Stand". After leaving The Distance, Oliver formed a rock trio called The Ministers with Jimmie Lee Sloas and Kip Raines. The band was then signed to Hollywood Records. The band recorded one album and disbanded.

Oliver then recorded and toured with Henry Lee Summer and Steven Curtis Chapman. Chapman's album "The Live Adventure", which included the song "Tuesdays Child", co-written by Oliver, won a Grammy in 1994.

Following the Live Adventure tour, Oliver joined the American country music group Blackhawk as guitarist. He toured and recorded with Blackhawk, as well as co-writing some of their music, such as "Almost a Memory Now", "Nobody's Fool" and "She Dances with her Shadow". The band opened for Reba McEntire. When Blackhawk founding member Van Stephenson died from cancer, Oliver left the band and began touring with McEntire as her lead guitarist.

After touring with McEntire, Oliver worked as staff writer for Warner Bros and composed music for EA Sports 2012, the 2013 Madden video game and produced a song for the 2008 NASCAR video game. Oliver also wrote songs for and produced the music of Christian rock band Casting Crowns. He composed music for the movies Facing the Giants and Unconditional and was a musician on the soundtracks for the movies Fireproof, Courageous and The Chronicles of Narnia: The Lion, the Witch and the Wardrobe. Oliver continues to record music and has recorded with Shania Twain, Kenny Chesney, Shinedown, Carrie Underwood, Sawyer Brown and Bucky Covington. Oliver cowrote songs with Covington and has produced his music.

=== Wrestling music composer (2002–present) ===
In 2002, Oliver joined NWA:TNA (later simply TNA) where he writes, records and produces music for entrance theme and pay-per-views. Oliver sang on Jeff Jarrett's entrance theme "My World" and AJ Styles' "I AM", for which he collaborated with rap group GRITS, rapped on Samoa Joe's "Nation of Violence" and played guitar on Sting's entrance theme. Oliver co-wrote, produced and played all instruments for James Storm's theme, "Longnecks and Rednecks" by Serg Salinas featuring Montgomery Gentry, and also appeared in the 2012 music video. Oliver also supplied the entrance themes for The Beautiful People/Velvet Sky, Madison Rayne, Dixie Carter, Tara, and Ethan Carter III.

In 2010, Oliver collaborated with TNA wrestler Jeff Hardy and Hardy's band Peroxwhy?gen on two songs. The first was a remix of the song "Modest" by Hardy. The other was a remix of the Peroxwhy?gen song "Another Me", which Hardy used as his entrance theme. In 2011, Oliver again teamed with Hardy to work on the track "Resurrected", which Hardy then began using the theme at TNA's "Bound For Glory" Pay-Per-View event on October 16, 2011. In 2013 Oliver produced, cowrote and played guitar on Peroxwhy?gen's newest album. He also, produced, performed and cowrote Christy Hemme's 2013 holiday album. In addition, he played guitar on the Shinedown album The Sound of Madness.

== Discography ==
Impact has released twelve albums containing Oliver's work during his Impact tenure, the first five of which have been released physically on CD, the rest are digital releases.

- NWA: TNA The Music, Vol. 1 (2003) [CD]
- NWA: TNA The Music, Vol. 2 (2003) [CD]
- 3rd Degree Burns: The Music of TNA Wrestling Vol. I (November 21, 2006) [CD]
- Meltdown: The Music of TNA Wrestling Vol. 2 (November 20, 2007) [CD]
- Emergence: The Music of TNA Wrestling (November 12, 2009) [CD]
- TNA Q4 (November 21, 2012)
- TNA Black EP (December 27, 2012)
- TNA Delirium EP (May 3, 2013)
- TNA Deliver EP (November 18, 2013)
- Evolution XIV (April 24, 2014)
- TOI (September 22, 2014)
- Rawk On! (February 13, 2015)
- POP (Past or Present) (December 28, 2015)

== Personal life ==
Oliver was raised in Kentucky. He has two children.
