= Lamborghini Asterion =

Hybrid concept car developed by Italian automobile manufacturer Lamborghini

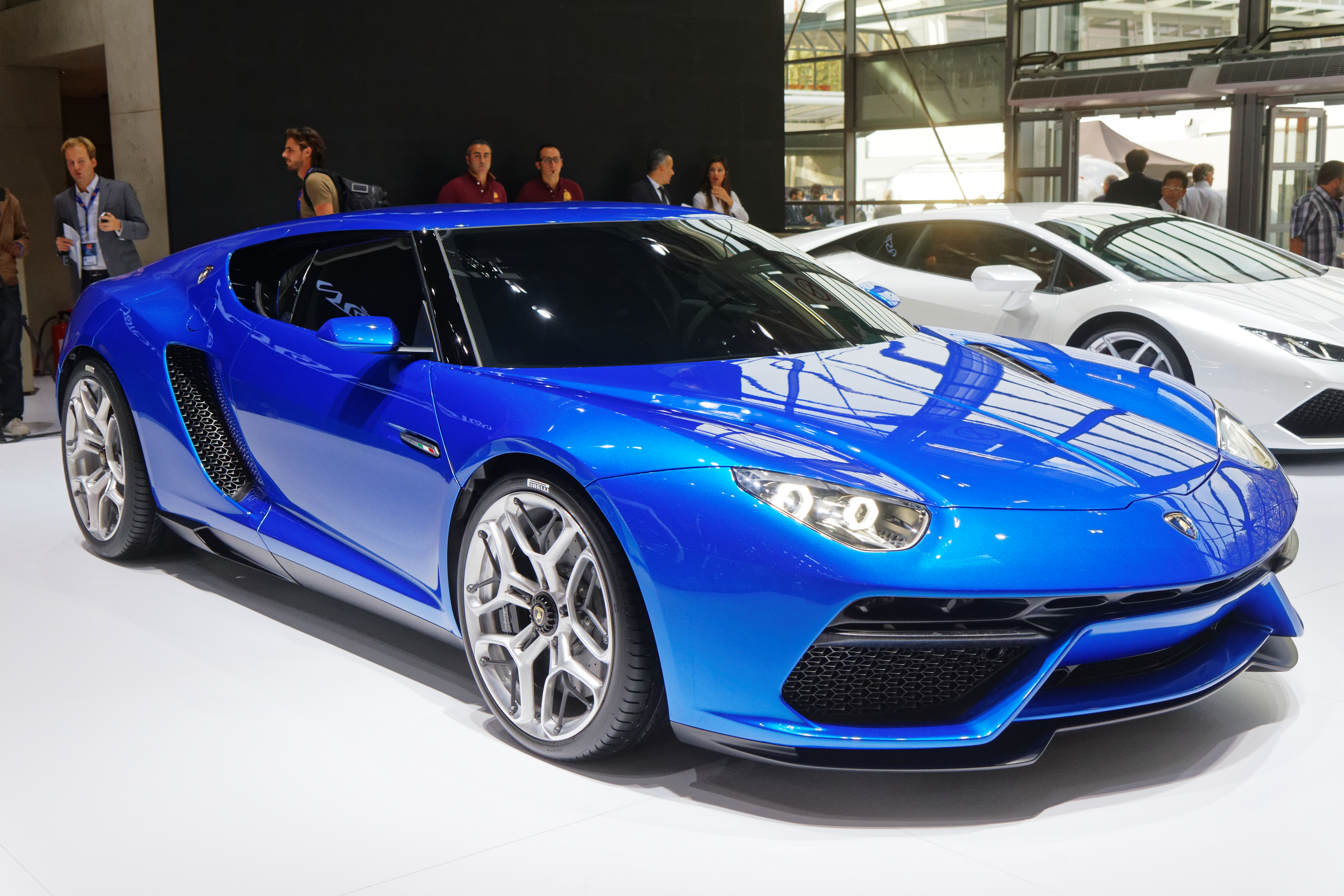

Overview
- Manufacturer: Lamborghini
- Production: 2014
- Designer: Filippo Perini

Body and chassis
- Class: Concept grand tourer (S)
- Body style: 2-door coupé
- Layout: Mid-engine, all-wheel-drive
- Doors: Swan
- Related: Lamborghini Huracán

Powertrain
- Engine: 5.2 L V10
- Electric motor: 3x Permanent-magnet synchronous electric motors
- Transmission: 7-speed LDF dual clutch
- Hybrid drivetrain: Plug-in hybrid (PHEV)
- Battery: Li-ion

Dimensions
- Length: 4,700 mm (185 in)
- Curb weight: 1,800 kg (3,968 lb)

The Lamborghini Asterion LPI 910-4 (LPI being an abbreviation for Longitudinale Posteriore Ibrido) is a concept hybrid car manufactured by Italian automobile manufacturer Lamborghini, which was unveiled at the 2014 Paris Motor Show. The car is named after a Minotaur called Asterion and was to be Lamborghini's first hybrid model. The half man – half bull Minotaur was chosen keeping in mind Lamborghini's tradition of naming their cars after a bull while alluding to its usage of different modes of power.

== Specifications and performance ==
The Asterion has a mid-mounted V10 engine shared with the Huracán generating a maximum power output of 610 PS (449 kW; 602 hp) and twin electric motors on the front axle besides a lithium-ion battery pack generating a combined power of 300 PS (221 kW; 296 hp). The batteries are placed in the central shaft, which improves the car's safety and center of gravity. The car features a torque vectoring system, a system typical on hybrid sports cars.

The Asterion has a top speed of 320 km/h (199 mph) which reduces to 125 km/h (78 mph) when running solely on electric power. The car can accelerate to 100 km/h (62 mph) in three seconds. The car is classified as a grand tourer and has a battery range of 50 km (31 miles). The hybrid technology adds 280 kg (617 lb) to the overall weight of the car.

The car has a sharp angular design and has a carbon-fibre monocoque borrowed from the Aventador along with carbon-fiber composite plastic body panels. The interior has a minimalistic layout and has ivory leather upholstery and has a carbon-fiber, aluminium and titanium trim with the seats placed higher and the windshield more vertical than traditional Lamborghini models in order for additional comfort, signifying the grand touring nature of the car.

The Asterion also has more storage space than the typical Lamborghini models. It contains three driving modes namely "Zero" (full electric mode), "Ibrido" (which runs the car on the combined power of the engine and the electric motors) and "Termico" (which runs the car on the engine only). The modes can be selected via buttons on the steering wheel.

== Cancellation ==
The car, which was to become Lamborghini's first hybrid model, was introduced as a 'technology demonstrator'. Stephan Winkelmann, then President and CEO of Lamborghini, stated in an interview with Autocar that the Asterion would not enter production and was being shelved in favor of the Urus SUV. According to him, it was done on the basis of customer reaction which favored hybrid technology only if it came with added performance. The car was planned to compete with similar hybrid cars, including the McLaren P1 and the Porsche 918 Spyder.

== Gallery ==
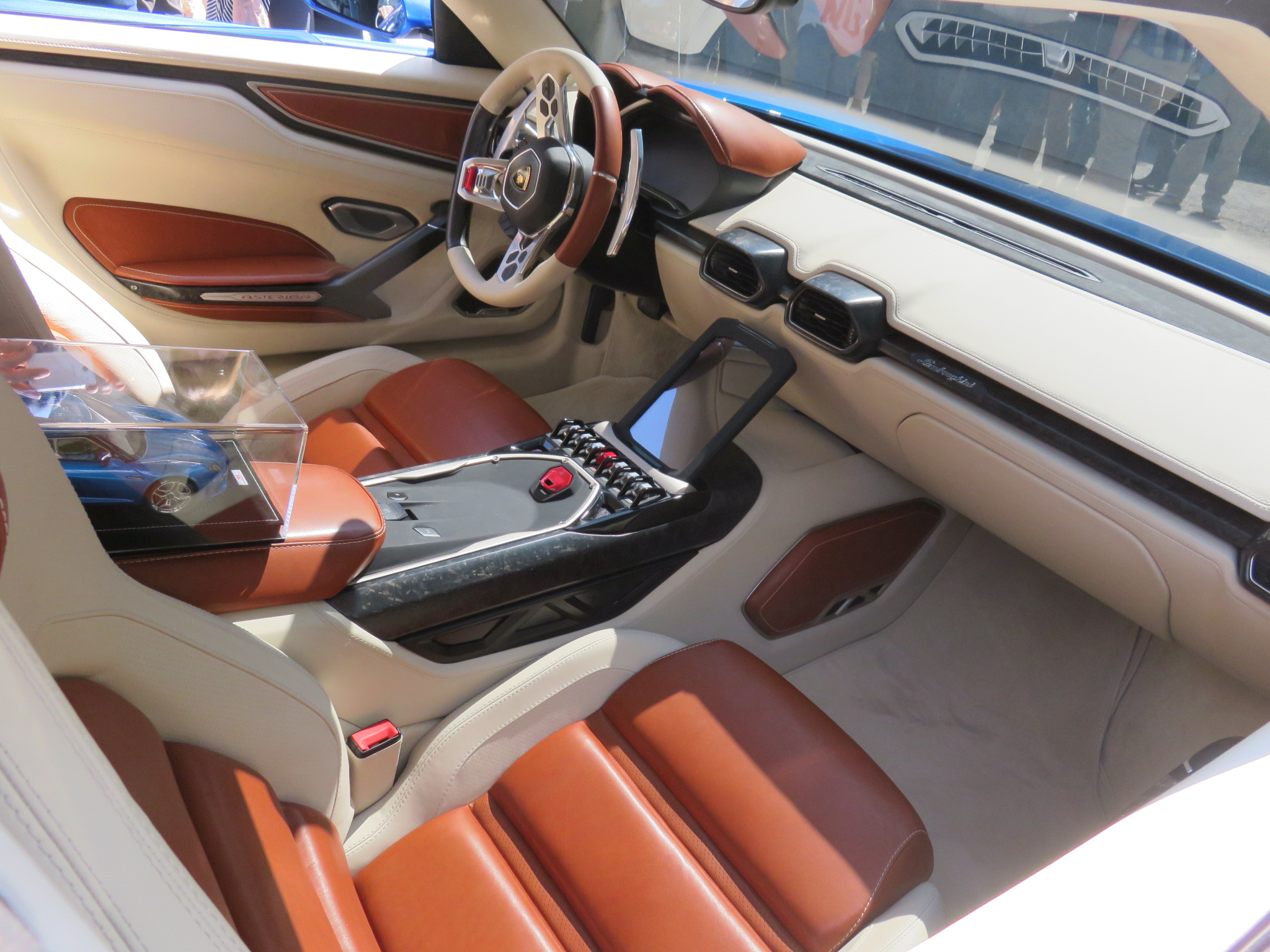

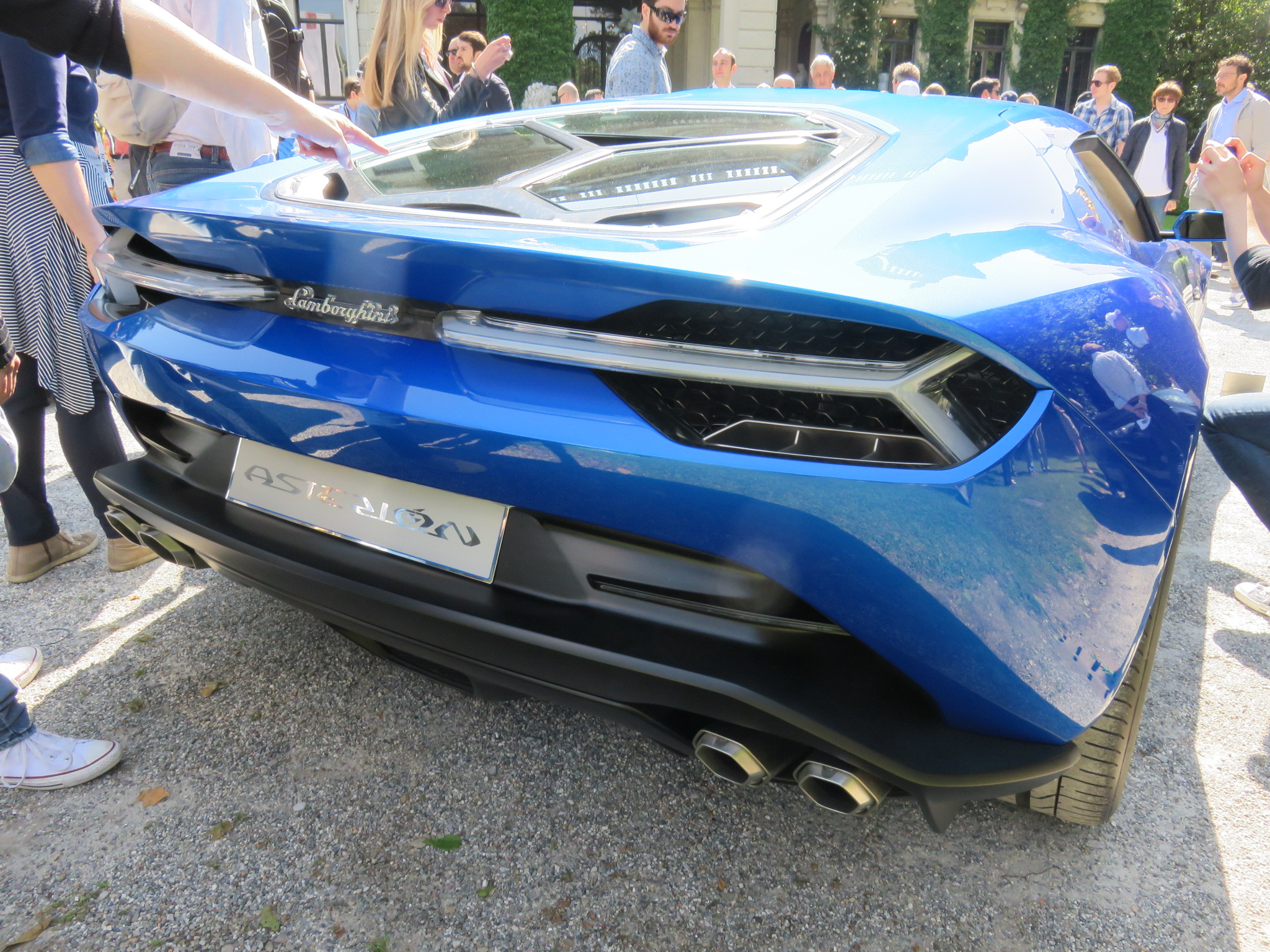

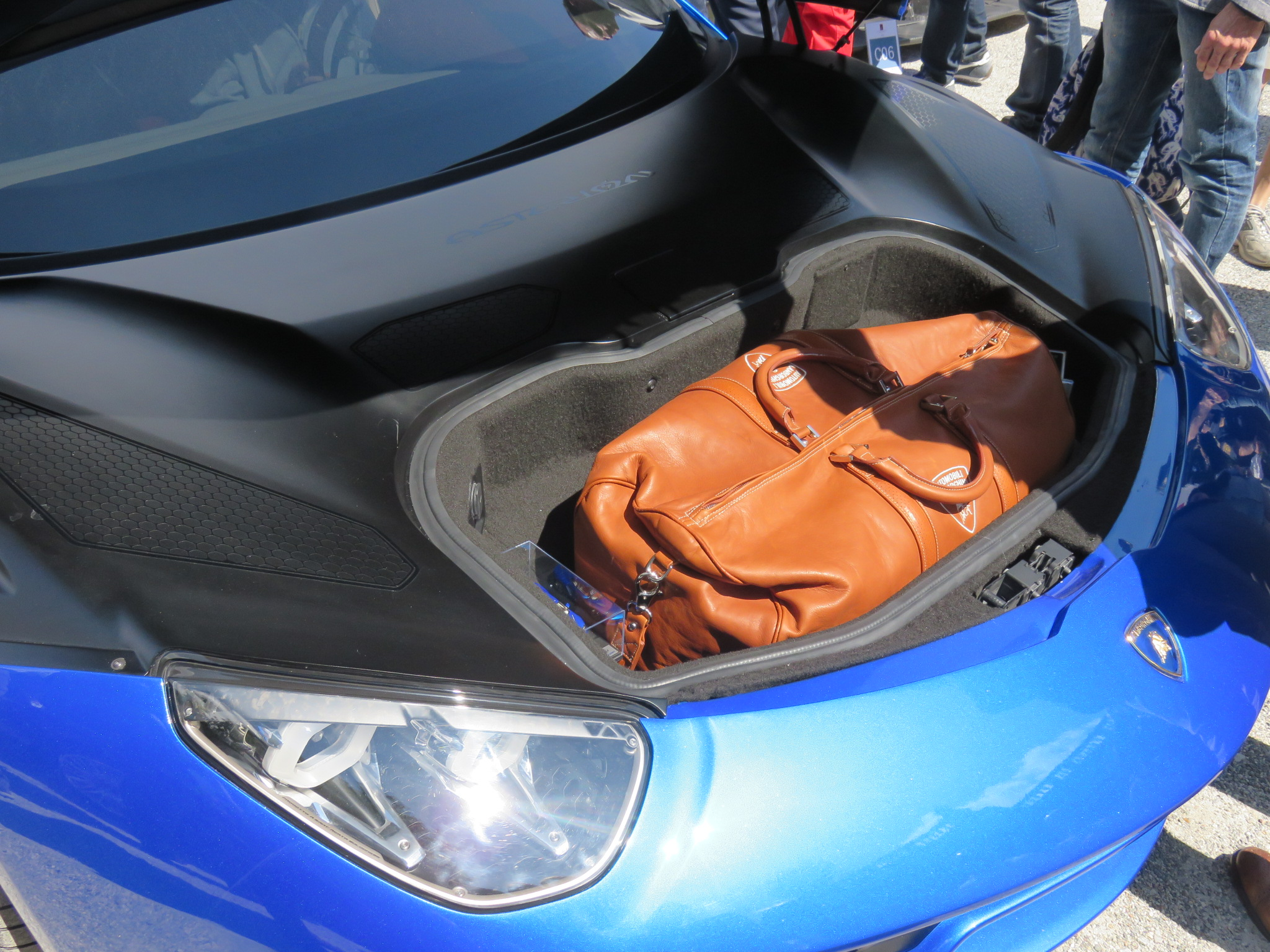

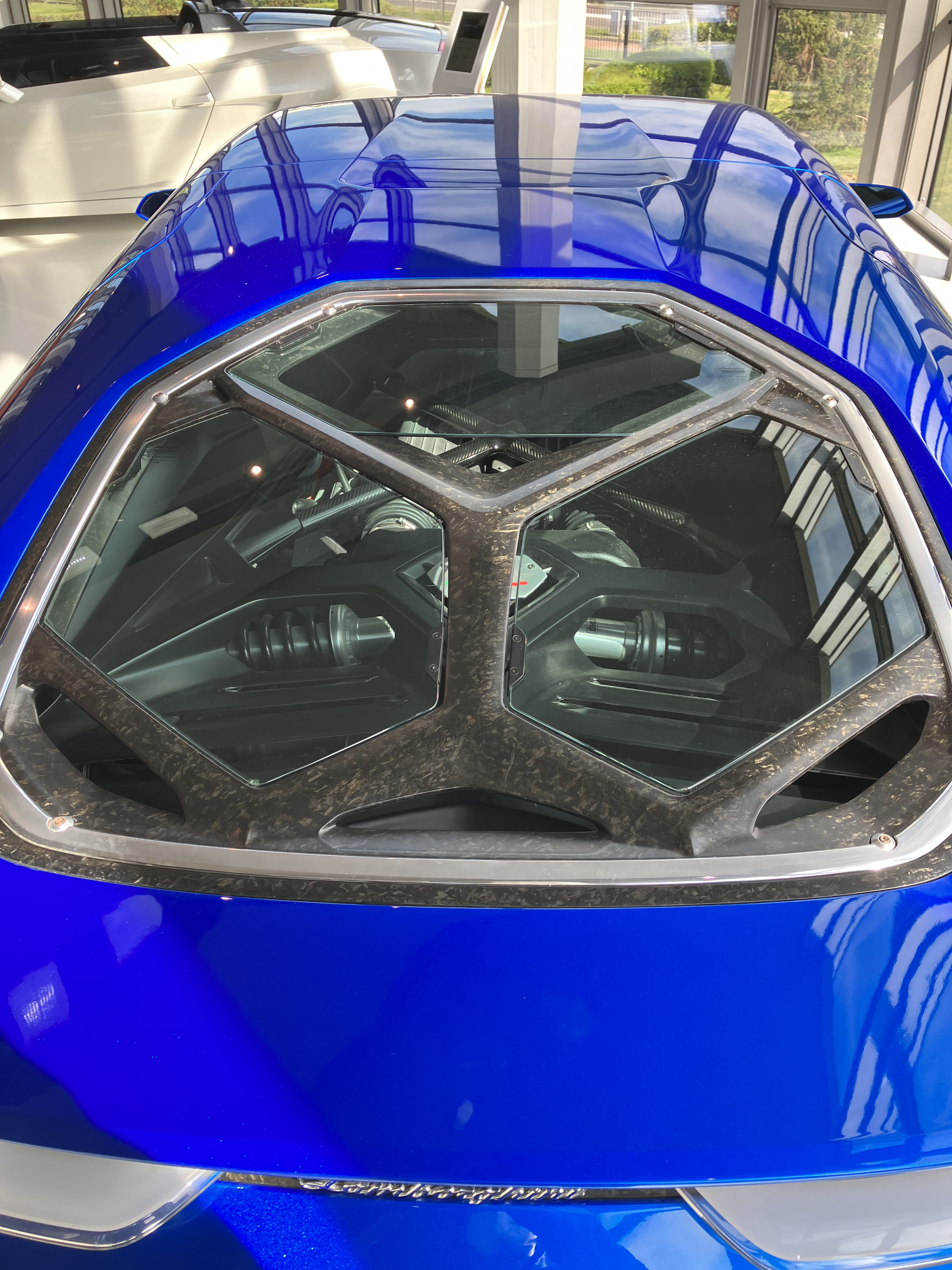
