= TNA Knockout Music =

TNA Knockout Music, LLC.
- Parent company: Total Nonstop Action Wrestling
- Founded: September 21, 2006; 19 years ago
- Founder: Jeff Jarrett
- Defunct: August 6, 2016; 9 years ago
- Genre: various
- Country of origin: United States

TNA Knockout Music LLC was an American record label operated by Total Nonstop Action Wrestling (TNA), primarily as a platform to release the entrance themes of the promotion's wrestling personalities. It was formed in September 2006, roughly four years following the formation of the TNA promotion in May 2002. Following a restructuring period, TNA Knockout Music legally ceased trading in August 2016, and the promotion would instead release its music independently through distributor TuneCore.

Prior to formation of the record label, Dale Oliver was already TNA's official Head Music Composer and Director of Audio Production. As well as Oliver, Serg Salinas, who is the husband of former TNA owner Dixie Carter, also performed alongside Oliver on select few tracks. Montgomery Gentry and Jeff Hardy have also produced songs alongside Oliver and Salinas, most notably Bobby Roode, James Storm, Matt Hardy, Jeff Hardy and The Latin American Xchange.

== History ==
In May 2002, the professional wrestling promotion Total Nonstop Action Wrestling (TNA) was founded by Jeff and Jerry Jarrett. Dale Oliver was hired in the same year as TNA's inception to be its Head Music Composer and Director of Audio Production. Dale's work with the company is mainly writing and producing theme music for the company's various wrestling personalities, programming and live events.

In 2006, TNA Knockout Music LLC. was filed on September 21 to serve as the record label for TNA Entertainment LLC, the parent company of TNA Wrestling.

On August 6, 2016, TNA Knockout Music LLC, alongside TNA Entertainment LLC., were both collapsed as the company began to trade as Impact Ventures LLC., following a restructuring with Billy Corgan becoming president, and former TNA president Dixie Carter becoming chairwoman.

Following the collapse of TNA Knockout Music, the promotion would continue to release music independently through music distributor, TuneCore.

== Album releases ==
=== Compilation albums ===
Album	Tracks	Release date	Notes
3rd Degree Burns: The Music of TNA Wrestling Vol. I	22	21 November 2006	CD / Digital
Meltdown: The Music of TNA Wrestling Volume 2	20	20 November 2007	CD / Digital
Emergence: The Music of TNA Wrestling	14	12 November 2009	CD / Digital
Q4	8	21 November 2012	Digital
Black	6	27 December 2012	Digital
Delirium	7	3 May 2013	Digital
Taryn Terrell's Hot Mess	4	29 May 2013	Digital
Deliver	8	18 November 2013	Digital
Evolution XIV	8	24 April 2014	Digital
TOI	15	22 September 2014	Digital
Rawk On!	10	13 February 2015	Digital
POP (Past or Present)	11	25 December 2015	Digital

=== Single-artist albums ===
Album	Tracks	Release date	Notes
Take a Fall (Beer Money)	1	2009	CD
Hard Justice Package (F.I.L.T.H.E.E.)	3	6 August 2009	CD
Similar Creatures (Jeff Hardy)	9	7 December 2012	CD / Digital
Plurality Of Worlds	10	2013	CD / Digital

== Single releases ==
Release date	Song	Featured artist	Subject	Length
17-May-2010	"Change Me"	Phather, Sun and the Holy Ghost	TNA Impact	03:08
17-May-2010	"Running with the Bulls"	Dale Oliver	Eric Bischoff	01:23
25-May-2010	"Menacing"	Dale Oliver	Desmond Wolfe	02:14
25-May-2010	"Tattooed Attitude"	Dale Oliver	Ink Inc.	02:28
25-May-2010	"Feedback"	Dale Oliver	Ken Anderson	01:52
25-May-2010	"Lethal X"	Dale Oliver	Jay Lethal	02:24
26-May-2010	"The Man in Me"	Dale Oliver and Serg Salinas	Dixie Carter	02:54
17-Dec-2010	"Hardcore Country"	Mickie James	Mickie James	03:11
14-Mar-2011	"Generation Me"	Dale Oliver	Generation Me	02:02
14-Mar-2011	"Jay Lethal"	Dale Oliver	Jay Lethal	02:24
14-Mar-2011	"Modest"	Peroxwhy?gen	Jeff Hardy	03:12
14-Mar-2011	"Rogue and Cold Blooded"	Dale Oliver	Matt Hardy	03:42
14-Mar-2011	"Hands of the Wicked"	Dale Oliver	Winter	04:09
21-Mar-2011	"Another Me"	Jeff Hardy	Jeff Hardy	03:41
12-May-2011	"Fortune 4"	Dale Oliver and Serg Salinas	Fortune	02:11
12-May-2011	"Immortals"	Dale Oliver	Immortal	02:12
09-Jun-2011	"Not a Stranger to Danger"	Dale Oliver and Charlie Sheets	Crimson	02:50
09-Jun-2011	"Killa Queen"	Dale Oliver, Serg Salinas and Charlie Sheets	Madison Rayne	03:14
15-Sep-2011	"Sinister Rise Above"	Dale Oliver and Serg Salinas	TNA Impact	01:56
15-Sep-2011	"Sinister Rise Above" (Instrumental)	Dale Oliver	TNA Impact	01:51
15-Sep-2011	"The Beaten Path"	Dale Oliver	Bully Ray	02:42
15-Sep-2011	"Raging of the Region"	Dale Oliver	Austin Aries	01:40
15-Sep-2011	"Blackhole"	Dale Oliver	Abyss	03:01
01-Nov-2011	"Resurrected"	Jeff Hardy	Jeff Hardy	02:40
09-Nov-2011	"Longnecks & Rednecks"	Dale Oliver and Serg Salinas	James Storm	03:10
09-Nov-2011	"Off the Chain"	Dale Oliver and Serg Salinas	Robert Roode	02:46
09-Dec-2011	"I Tease, U Touch"	Dale Oliver and Serg Salinas	Miss Tessmacher	03:02
24-Feb-2012	"Big Rob"	Dale Oliver	Rob Terry	02:41
24-Feb-2012	"Devon"	Dale Oliver	Devon	02:07
24-Feb-2012	"Get Your Fist Pumpin' in the Air"	Dale Oliver	Robbie E	02:08
24-Feb-2012	"I Am, I Am" ('11 Remix)	Dale Oliver	A.J. Styles	03:15
24-Feb-2012	"Order of Chaos"	Dale Oliver	Kid Kash	02:21
24-Feb-2012	"The Way of the Ring"	Dale Oliver	Matt Morgan & Crimson	03:06
24-Feb-2012	"Puppets on a String"	Dale Oliver and Serg Salinas	Gail Kim	02:10
24-Feb-2012	"Vintage"	Dale Oliver	Eric Young	02:21
27-Feb-2012	"Wings of a Fallen Angel" ('11 Remix)	Dale Oliver	Christopher Daniels	02:53
27-Feb-2012	"Stand Up"	F.I.L.T.H.E.E.	Mexican America	02:01
14-Oct-2012	"Similar Creatures"	Jeff Hardy	Jeff Hardy	03:26
15-Nov-2012	"Off the Chain" (Instrumental)	Dale Oliver and Serg Salinas	Robert Roode	02:07
19-Nov-2012	"Killa Queen" (Instrumental)	Dale Oliver and Serg Salinas	Madison Rayne	02:38
19-Nov-2012	"Puppets on a String" (With Lyrics)	Dale Oliver and Serg Salinas	Gail Kim	03:05
28-Mar-2013	"Dead Man's Hand"	Dale Oliver and Serg Salinas	Aces and Eights	03:24
20-Jun-2015	"The Ghost in Us"	Dale Oliver and Serg Salinas	The Rising	03:14
21-Aug-2015	"Heel for Your Face"	Dale Oliver	The Dollhouse	02:11
21-Aug-2015	"Heel for Your Face (More Fun)"	Dale Oliver	The Dollhouse	02:11

== See also ==
- List of Total Nonstop Action Wrestling albums
- Music in professional wrestling
- List of record labels
