= Emergent Labs =

Artificial intelligence software company

Emergent
- Type: Private
- Industry: Software; Artificial intelligence
- Founded: 2024; 2 years ago
- Founders: Mukund Jha; Madhav Jha
- Key people: Mukund Jha (CEO); Madhav Jha (CTO); Manav Garg (executive chairman)
- Products: Emergent; Wingman
- Website: emergent.sh

Emergent, also known as Emergent Labs, is an Indian artificial intelligence (AI) software company with operations in San Francisco and Bengaluru. It operates a vibe coding platform on which AI agents build, test and deploy web and mobile applications from natural-language prompts. The company also develops Wingman, an AI agent for business automation.

Emergent Labs app icon

Founded in 2024 by twin brothers Mukund Jha and Madhav Jha, Emergent developed automated software-testing tools before moving into application development. It earns revenue from subscriptions, usage-based credits and deployment charges. In July 2026, a US$130 million Series C round valued the company at US$1.5 billion.

In February 2026, the company's reported annualised revenue run rate of US$100 million prompted debate over whether revenue from subscriptions, credits and deployment could be counted as annual recurring revenue.

== History ==
Emergent was founded in 2024 by Mukund Jha and his twin brother Madhav Jha. Mukund had previously co-founded the Indian quick-commerce company Dunzo. The brothers began work on automated coding and software testing in early 2024. Emergent joined Y Combinator's Summer 2024 batch and later shifted from testing software to building applications.

The company considered selling to enterprises before developing a consumer platform. Its head of product attributed the shift to lengthy enterprise sales cycles. A private beta began in February 2025, and the platform launched publicly in June 2025.

In September 2025, Emergent raised US$23 million in a Series A round led by Lightspeed Venture Partners. In January 2026, the company announced a US$70 million Series B round co-led by SoftBank Vision Fund 2 and Khosla Ventures.

In April 2026, Emergent moved into business automation with the launch of Wingman. In June 2026, Manav Garg of Together Fund became executive chairman.

In July 2026, Emergent raised US$130 million in a Series C round led by the private equity firm Creaegis, which valued the company at US$1.5 billion.

== Platform ==
On Emergent's platform, users describe an application in natural language, and AI agents generate, test and deploy it. The company develops its own coding agent and hosts the applications built on the platform. It also provides a browser-based environment for editing code.

The platform targets people without programming experience, including small-business owners and employees who build internal applications. Emergent earns revenue from subscriptions, usage-based credits and charges for hosting applications. According to Inc42, competition from AI model developers such as Anthropic and Google was a risk to coding platforms built on their models. In July 2026, Mukund Jha said that many AI-built websites looked alike and described design as a limitation.

=== Reception ===
In a 2026 study of six automated bug-fixing systems, the tested version of Emergent's E1 agent resolved 286 of the 500 cases on SWE-bench Verified, fewer than the other five, which resolved between 291 and 323.

Reviewing the platform for TechRadar in July 2026, Christian Cawley had it build a working cryptocurrency calculator and credited the clarifying questions it asked with keeping the project in scope. He was less impressed by its speed, writing that the 17 minutes it took lagged competing tools, and by its limited free deployment options and the credits the test used. Mabel Kenneth of Memeburn built a marketplace prototype with Emergent in about 18 minutes in October 2026 and reported that it corrected a runtime error after she sent a screenshot. She too faulted the cost: the build and the correction used 85.96 of the trial's 100 credits, leaving too few to deploy the result.

== Wingman ==
Wingman, launched in April 2026, is an AI agent for business automation. According to Emergent, it takes instructions through messaging services, works across a user's connected workplace applications, and asks for approval before more consequential actions. Mukund Jha said the agent was less reliable when instructions were vague or a task needed significant human judgment.

== Marketing ==
Emergent's marketing has included influencers and paid advertising. In June 2026, Praveen Gopal Krishnan of The Ken noted that few of the company's users were visible in public despite the revenue it reported. Gaurav Bisen, who had helped set up Emergent's early marketing, suggested that customers who used the software privately for work might not discuss it in public.

== Revenue reporting controversy ==
Emergent reported an annualised revenue run rate of US$100 million in February 2026 and US$120 million in July 2026. The run rate combined subscriptions, usage-based credits and deployment charges, which prompted debate over whether it qualified as annual recurring revenue (ARR).

Critics focused on how durable that revenue was. Chaitanya Chokkareddy, co-founder and chief technology officer of Ozonetel, said a customer might cancel a subscription once a single project was finished, and Nikhil Pahwa, founder and editor of MediaNama, argued that token consumption measured activity rather than whether customers stayed. Outlook Business took the same view, writing that usage-based revenue was more volatile and harder to predict than conventional recurring revenue; Manav Garg, an Emergent investor who later became its executive chairman, called the company's metric a run rate rather than conventional ARR.

Mukund Jha said that Emergent had collected US$8.3 million in March 2026, equivalent to an annual rate of US$99.6 million. Vinod Khosla, whose firm had invested in Emergent, defended the use of differing definitions of ARR where they reflected cash receipts.

Mukund Jha defended the figure, saying Emergent had collected US$8.3 million in March 2026, an annual rate of US$99.6 million, and Vinod Khosla, whose firm had backed the company, held that differing definitions of ARR were acceptable where they reflected cash receipts. Investors quoted by The Financial Express, among them Alok Goyal of Stellaris Venture Partners and Abhishek Srivastava of Kae Capital, suggested that AI companies be judged on realised revenue, customer retention and outcomes rather than token consumption alone.

== See also ==
- Lovable
- Replit
