= Emergency (disambiguation) =

An emergency is a situation that poses an immediate risk to health, life, property, or environment.

Emergency or The Emergency may also refer to:

== States of emergency ==
- Aden Emergency, the colonial guerilla war in Yemen 1963–1967
- Cyprus Emergency, the colonial guerilla war in Cyprus 1955–1959
- Jewish insurgency in Mandatory Palestine, also known as the Palestine Emergency, the colonial guerilla war in Palestine 1944–1948
- Malayan Emergency, the colonial guerrilla war in Malaya 1948–1960
- Mau Mau rebellion, also known as the Kenya Emergency, the colonial guerilla war in Kenya 1952–1956
- Nyasaland emergency of 1959
- The Emergency (India), the state of emergency 1975–1977
- The Emergency (Ireland), a state of emergency during World War II
- State of Emergency (disambiguation)

== Arts and entertainment ==
=== Film and television ===
- Emergency (1962 film), a British drama film
- Emergency (2022 film), an American comedy thriller film
- Emergency (2025 film), an Indian biographical historical drama
- Emergency!, a 1970s American TV series
  - Emergency +4, an animated series based on the American TV series
- Emergency (Philippine TV program), a Philippine TV documentary
- Emergency (1959 Australian TV series), an Australian drama series
- Emergency (2020 Australian TV series), an Australian factual series

=== Gaming ===
- Emergency (video game series), from 1998
  - Emergency (video game), the first in the series

=== Literature ===
- Emergency: This Book Will Save Your Life, a 2009 book on survival preparedness by Neil Strauss
- The Emergency: A Personal History, a 2015 book by Coomi Kapoor about The Emergency in India

=== Music ===
- The Emergency and Joel Plaskett Emergency, a Canadian rock band
- Emergency Records, a record label

==== Albums ====
- Emergency! (album), by The Tony Williams Lifetime
- Emergency (Kool & the Gang album), 1984
- Emergency (The Pigeon Detectives album), 2008
- Emergency: Quantum Leap, a 2019 EP by X1

==== Songs ====
- "Emergency" (Paramore song), 2005
- "Emergency" (Tank song), 2010
- "Emergency" (Icona Pop song), 2015
- "Emergency" (WizzyPro song), 2013
- "Emergency", a 2012 song by Audio Playground featuring Snoop Dogg
- "Emergency", a song by Ateez from the 2023 album The World EP.Fin: Will
- "Emergency", a song by Girlschool from the 1980 album Demolition
- "Emergency", three singles by Mavado
- "Emergency", a song by Motörhead from the 1981 EP St. Valentine's Day Massacre
- "Emergency", a 2009 song by Steve Rushton
- "Emergency", a song by The Whispers from the 1981 album Love Is Where You Find It
- "Emergency", a song by Wonderland from the 2011 album Wonderland
- "Emergency", a song by 999 from the 1978 album 999
- "Emergency (Dial 999)", by Loose Ends, 1984
- "Emergency (911)", a song by Jordin Sparks from the 2009 album Battlefield

== Other uses ==
- Emergency (organization), a humanitarian NGO
- when the Emergency brake (train) is applied the train can be said to "go into emergency"

== See also ==
- Emergence (disambiguation)
- Emergen-C, a vitamin supplement
- Emergency department, a medical treatment facility
- Emergency management
