= Nissan URGE =

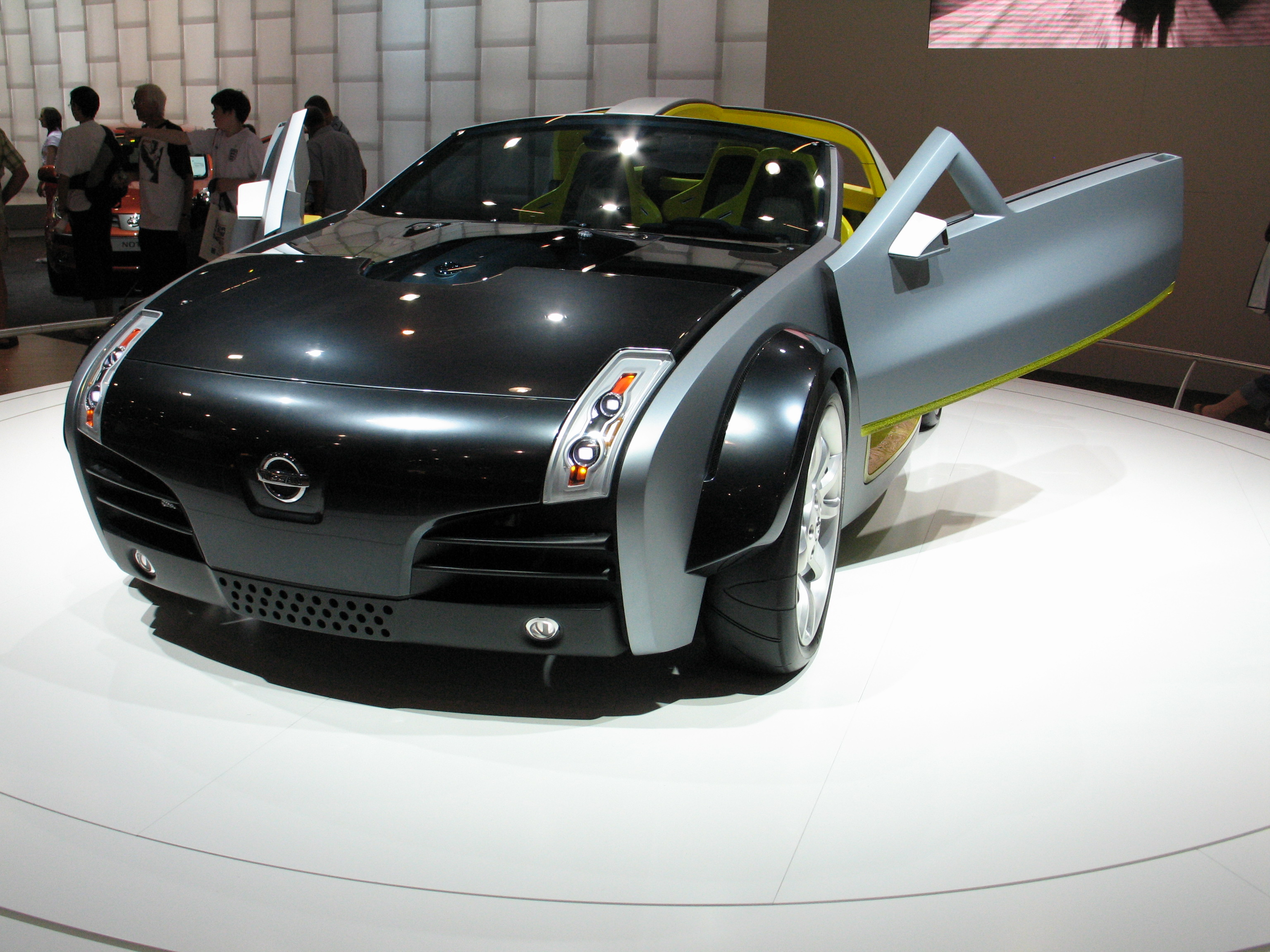

Overview
- Manufacturer: Nissan
- Production: 2006 (Concept car)

Body and chassis
- Class: Sports car (S)
- Body style: 2-door targa
- Layout: FR layout
- Doors: Swan doors

Powertrain
- Power output: 610 hp (454 kW)
- Transmission: 6-speed sequential manual transmission

Dimensions
- Wheelbase: 104.3 in (2,649 mm)
- Length: 156.6 in (3,978 mm)
- Width: 71.8 in (1,824 mm)
- Height: 49.6 in (1,260 mm)
- Curb weight: 2,400 lb (1,100 kg) (target)

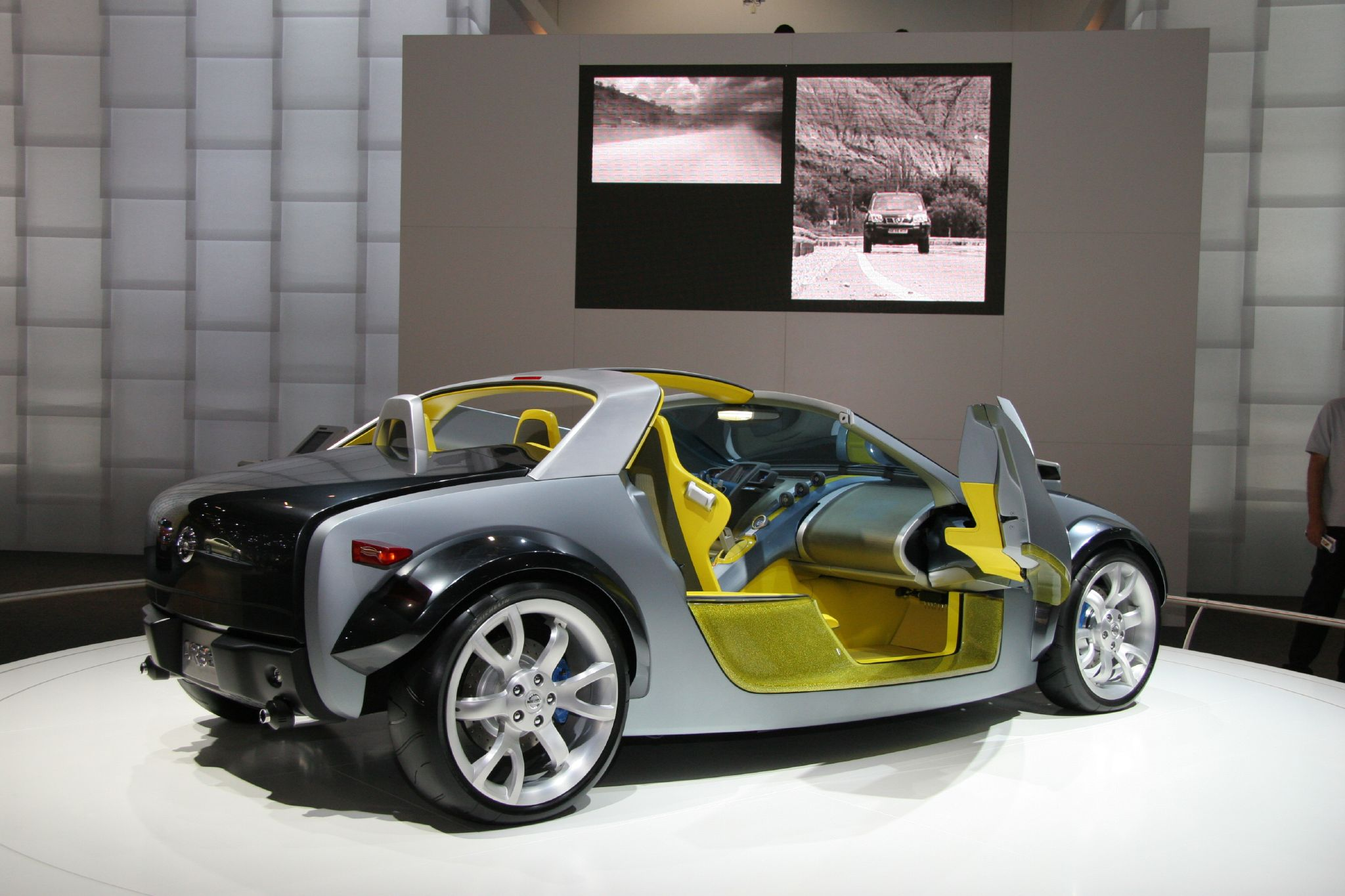
Rear end

The Nissan URGE is a concept targa top sports car that debuted at the 2006 North American International Auto Show. Referred to as a "design exercise," many of the car's design elements were influenced by an internet survey aimed towards young automotive and video game enthusiasts. The design incorporates technological elements such as swan doors and a built in Xbox 360 game console. Though not intended for production, the concept was intended to represent a sports car that was more affordable than the Z or GT-R.
