= List of Total Nonstop Action Wrestling albums =

This is a list of albums released by Total Nonstop Action Wrestling.

== NWA: TNA The Music, Vol. 1 ==
NWA: TNA The Music, Vol. 1

Compilation album by Total Nonstop Action Wrestling
- Released: Early 2003
- Label: NWA-TNA Music (independent)
- Producer: Dale Oliver

NWA: TNA The Music, Vol. 1 is the first of two CDs released from NWA: TNA, in early 2003. These CDs were not available in stores, and instead were sold at merchandise stalls at the weekly Wednesday night pay-per-views, and on the TNA website. All of the songs were written and composed by producer, Dale Oliver. This was succeeded by a second album later that year, following the same exclusivity trend as this volume.

The themes of A.J. Styles and Jeff Jarrett were later re-released on 3rd Degree Burns: The Music of TNA Wrestling Vol. I album, the first TNA album release after the company disassociated itself with the National Wrestling Alliance.

=== Track listing ===
All music is composed by Dale Oliver.

No.	Title	Subject	Length
1.	"Champion"	Curt Hennig	02:50
2.	"Knock You Down"	TNA Dancers	02:55
3.	"I Am"	A.J. Styles	02:55
4.	"Flyin' to Graceland"	The Flying Elvises	02:36
5.	"Marvelous Me"	Scott Hall	03:02
6.	"My World"	Jeff Jarrett	03:22
7.	"War Necks"	The Harris Brothers	02:18
8.	"Lion's Den"	Ken Shamrock	02:39
9.	"Take You Under"	The New Church	03:49
10.	"Sex Sells"	Sports Entertainment Xtreme	02:48

== NWA: TNA The Music, Vol. 2 ==
NWA: TNA The Music, Vol. 2

Compilation album by Total Nonstop Action Wrestling
- Released: Late 2003
- Genres: Rock; Hip hop
- Label: NWA-TNA Music (independent)
- Producer: Dale Oliver

NWA: TNA The Music, Vol. 2 is the second CD released from NWA: TNA, in late 2003. Like NWA: TNA The Music, Vol. 1, it was not available in stores, and instead were sold at merchandise stalls at the weekly Wednesday night pay-per-views, and on the TNA website. All of the tracks were composed by producer Dale Oliver.

=== Track listing ===
All music is composed by Dale Oliver.

No.	Title	Subject	Length
1.	"My World" (Remix)	Jeff Jarrett	03:55
2.	"3 Live K" (Featuring 3Live Kru)	3Live Kru	03:17
3.	"Guilty"	America's Most Wanted	01:15
4.	"Down with the Brown"	D'Lo Brown	01:40
5.	"I Am" (Phenomenal Remix)	A.J. Styles	02:55
6.	"KK Rocks"	Kid Kash	01:25
7.	"Y'alla Never Forget" (Featuring Elix Skipper)	Elix Skipper	01:55
8.	"Funk With"	New York Connection	02:01
9.	"Down in the Catacombs"	Abyss	02:30
10.	"Symphonic Anarchy"	Legend	02:36
11.	"TNA Theme"	NWA: TNA	02:11
12.	"Scream"	Raven	02:23
13.	"Deep"	Shane Douglas	01:31
14.	"Snap This"	Justin Credible	01:22
15.	"XXX Gonna Give it"	Triple X	02:12
16.	"F.U. System"	Vince Russo	01:53
17.	"Machine"	Michael Shane	01:24
18.	"Modern Oz"	Chris Sabin	01:27
19.	"Skinn"	Sonny Siaki	01:20
20.	"Dodging Bullets" (Featuring Goldy Locks)	Trinity	02:58

== 3rd Degree Burns: The Music of TNA Wrestling, Vol. I ==
3rd Degree Burns: The Music of TNA Wrestling, Vol. I

Compilation album by Total Nonstop Action Wrestling
- Released: November 21, 2006
- Recorded: Zoo Studios – Franklin, Tennessee
- Genre: Rock
- Length: 46:56
- Labels: TNA Knockout Music, LLC
- Producer: Dale Oliver

3rd Degree Burns: The Music of TNA Wrestling Vol. I is the first CD released after the company became known as Total Nonstop Action Wrestling – and third CD release overall. The album was released on November 21, 2006, featuring the entrance music of TNA wrestlers, as well as "prequel" tracks from the Victory Road 2006 PPV.

=== Track listing ===
All music is composed by Dale Oliver.

No.	Title	Subject	Length
1.	"Prequel"	Sting	00:59
2.	"Slay Me"	Sting	02:18
3.	"No More Fears"	Robert Roode	01:53
4.	"Prequel"	Samoa Joe	01:04
5.	"Crush U Up"	Samoa Joe	03:06
6.	"Society Box"	Christy Hemme	03:32
7.	"Stampede"	Rhino	02:05
8.	"Prequel"	Jeff Jarrett	00:58
9.	"My World"	Jeff Jarrett	02:02
10.	"I Am"	A.J. Styles	02:54
11.	"Prequel"	Raven	01:11
12.	"Scream"	Raven	02:23
13.	"Paparazzi / Up Yours"	Alex Shelley	02:02
14.	"Prequel"	Abyss	00:59
15.	"Down in the Catacombs"	Abyss	02:27
16.	"Guilty"	America's Most Wanted	02:24
17.	"Eat Me"	Shark Boy	02:49
18.	"Nobody Moves"	James Gang	02:49
19.	"Unstoppable"	Gail Kim	01:59
20.	"Prequel"	Christian Cage	00:32
21.	"Take Over"	Christian Cage	01:43
22.	"Adrenaline Rush" (Featuring Marc Williams & Vernon Kay)	Bonus Track	03:31

== Meltdown: The Music of TNA Wrestling Volume 2 ==
Meltdown: The Music of TNA Wrestling Volume 2

Compilation album by Total Nonstop Action Wrestling
- Released: November 20, 2007
- Recorded: Zoo Studios - Franklin, Tennessee
- Genre: Rock
- Labels: TNA Knockout Music, LLC
- Producer: Dale Oliver

Meltdown: The Music of TNA Wrestling Volume 2 is the fourth CD released from Total Nonstop Action Wrestling on November 20, 2007, featuring the entrance music of TNA wrestlers.

=== Track listing ===
All music is composed by Dale Oliver.

No.	Title	Subject	Length
1.	"To Live and Die in LAX" (Featuring Serg Salinas)	The Latin American Xchange	02:32
2.	"Canadian Destroyer"	Petey Williams	02:05
3.	"1967"	The Motor City Machineguns	02:21
4.	"Black Reign"	Black Reign	02:04
5.	"Gold Metal" (Featuring Marc Predka)	Kurt Angle	02:47
6.	"We Find the Defendants Guilty"	"Wildcat" Chris Harris	02:05
7.	"Pomp and Circumstance / Black Machismo Remix"	Jay Lethal	01:51
8.	"Kaz"	Kaz	01:55
9.	"Valor"	Lance Hoyt	02:01
10.	"Sorry About Your Damn Luck"	"Cowboy" James Storm	03:20
11.	"He’s Back" (Featuring Adam Jones & Kareem Farmer)	Pacman Jones	01:12
12.	"In My House"	Voodoo Kin Mafia	01:13
13.	"Guru"	Sonjay Dutt	01:58
14.	"Watch Out, Watch Out"	Team 3D	02:05
15.	"Screwed"	Tomko	02:11
16.	"Wings of a Fallen Angel"	Christopher Daniels	02:16
17.	"God Check"	Frank Wycheck	02:28
18.	"Ave Vampire"	Judas Mesias	02:26
19.	"Impact Theme"	TNA Impact!	01:55
20.	"Duelin’ Dales" (Bonus Track)	Slammiversary ’07	02:02

== Emergence: The Music of TNA Wrestling ==
Emergence: The Music of TNA Wrestling

Compilation album by Total Nonstop Action Wrestling
- Released: November 12, 2009
- Genre: Rock
- Length: 32:29
- Labels: TNA Knockout Music, LLC
- Producer: Dale Oliver / Serg Salinas

Emergence: The Music of TNA Wrestling is the fifth CD released from Total Nonstop Action Wrestling. It is also TNA's final physical CD release overall as its subsequent albums would be exclusively digital releases.

=== Track listing ===
All music is composed by Dale Oliver.

No.	Title	Subject	Length
1.	"Cross the Line" (Performed by AD/AM)	TNA iMPACT!	02:21
2.	"Chic Chic Bang Bang" (Performed by AD/AM)	Mick Foley	02:22
3.	"The Boss"	Bobby Lashley	02:25
4.	"5150" (Performed by F.I.L.T.H.E.E.)	Homicide	02:17
5.	"Broken" (Featuring Goldy Locks)	Tara	02:32
6.	"The British Invasion"	The British Invasion	02:35
7.	"Te Gusta O No!!"	Hernandez	02:25
8.	"Angel on My Shoulder"	The Beautiful People	01:28
9.	"Nation of Violence"	Samoa Joe	01:51
10.	"Motorcity" (Performed by AD/AM)	The Motor City Machineguns	03:20
11.	"The Main Event Mafia"	The Main Event Mafia	01:54
12.	"Take a Fall" (Featuring Serg Salinas)	Beer Money, Inc.	02:40
13.	"Catholi-Funk"	"The Pope" D'Angelo Dinero	02:06
14.	"Coming Alive" (Performed by AD/AM)	Suicide	02:05

== Q4 ==
Q4

EP by Total Nonstop Action Wrestling
- Released: November 21, 2012
- Genre: Rock
- Length: 18:06
- Labels: TNA Knockout Music, LLC
- Producer: Dale Oliver / Serg Salinas

Q4 is the sixth album released from Total Nonstop Action Wrestling on November 21, 2012. It is a digital release and has not been released physically (CD).

=== Track listing ===
All music is composed by Dale Oliver.

No.	Title	Subject	Length
1.	"Killa Queen" (Instrumental)	Madison Rayne	02:39
2.	"Puppets on a String" (Feat. Sean Patrick McGraw)	Gail Kim	03:05
3.	"Hot Mess"	Taryn Terrell	02:03
4.	"Raging of the Region"	Austin Aries	01:40
5.	"The Beaten Path"	Bully Ray	02:42
6.	"Devious"	Bad Influence	02:28
7.	"Day of Rage"	Gunner	02:18
8.	"Broken" (Featuring Goldy Locks)	Tara	02:31

== Black ==
Black

EP by Total Nonstop Action Wrestling
- Released: December 27, 2012
- Genre: Rock
- Length: 14:45
- Labels: TNA Knockout Music, LLC
- Producer: Dale Oliver / Serg Salinas

Black is the seventh album released from Total Nonstop Action Wrestling on December 27, 2012. It is a digital release and has not been released physically (CD).

=== Track listing ===
All music is composed by Dale Oliver.

No.	Title	Subject	Length
1.	"Brother to Brother"	Joseph Park	01:55
2.	"Come On"	Joey Ryan	02:01
3.	"Deadman's Hand" (Instrumental)	Aces & Eights	02:10
4.	"Magic Machine"	Kenny King	03:37
5.	"Rock Star"	Zema Ion	01:59
6.	"Te Kill Ya"	Chavo Guerrero	02:58

== Delirium ==
Delirium

EP by Total Nonstop Action Wrestling
- Released: May 5, 2013
- Genre: Rock
- Length: 14:45
- Labels: TNA Knockout Music, LLC
- Producer: Dale Oliver / Serg Salinas

Delirium is the eighth album released from Total Nonstop Action Wrestling on May 3, 2013. It is a digital release and has not been released physically (CD).

=== Track listing ===
All music is composed by Dale Oliver.

No.	Title	Subject	Length
1.	"Bad Influence"	Bad Influence	02:17
2.	"King of the Ring"	Kenny King	02:14
3.	"Loaded Gun"	Garett Bischoff	02:34
4.	"Motor City"	The Motor City Machineguns	02:53
5.	"Mr. Pectacular"	Jessie Godderz	01:47
6.	"Rise Above"	Christian York	02:42
7.	"Streets"	Jack Evans	02:02

== Deliver ==
Deliver

EP by Total Nonstop Action Wrestling
- Released: November 18, 2013
- Genre: Rock
- Labels: TNA Knockout Music, LLC
- Producer: Dale Oliver / Serg Salinas

Deliver is the ninth album released from Total Nonstop Action Wrestling on November 18, 2013. It is a digital release and has not been released physically (CD).

=== Track listing ===
All music is composed by Dale Oliver.

No.	Title	Subject	Length
1.	"Hail Sabin"	Chris Sabin	02:41
2.	"Heel for Ya Face"	Lei'D Tapa	02:51
3.	"Inner Villain"	T. J. Perkins	01:55
4.	"Leather"	Dusty Rhodes	01:19
5.	"Puppet on a String" (Sword Intro)	Gail Kim	03:14
6.	"The Man in Me" (Country Mix)	Dixie Carter	02:59
7.	"Trouble"	Ethan Carter III	02:32
8.	"Unhinged"	Angelina Love	02:47

== Evolution XIV ==
Evolution XIV

EP by Total Nonstop Action Wrestling
- Released: April 24, 2014
- Genre: Rock
- Labels: TNA Knockout Music, LLC
- Producer: Dale Oliver / Serg Salinas

Evolution XIV is the tenth album released from Total Nonstop Action Wrestling on April 24, 2014. It is a digital release and has not been released physically (CD).

=== Track listing ===
All music is composed by Dale Oliver.

No.	Title	Subject	Length
1.	"A Reign That Never Ends"	Brittany	02:05
2.	"Angel on My Shoulder"	The Beautiful People	01:45
3.	"Boom"	The BroMans	02:30
4.	"Dead Flowers"	Samuel Shaw	02:12
5.	"Force of Nature"	The Wolves	02:44
6.	"Willow's Way" (Performed by Jeff Hardy)	Willow	03:00
7.	"Killa Queen" (Remix)	Madison Rayne	03:22
8.	"Cut You Down" (Featuring Serg Salinas)	James Storm	02:51

== TOI ==
TOI

Compilation album by Total Nonstop Action Wrestling
- Released: September 22, 2014
- Genre: Rock
- Labels: TNA Knockout Music, LLC
- Producer: Dale Oliver / Serg Salinas

TOI is the eleventh album released from Total Nonstop Action Wrestling on September 22, 2014. It is a digital release and has not been released physically (CD).

=== Track listing ===
All music is composed by Dale Oliver.

No.	Title	Subject	Length
1.	"Domination"	Lashley	02:22
2.	"Catatonic"	Bram	02:32
3.	"A Reign That Never Ends"	Brittany	02:05
4.	"Hero of the Storm"	Chris Melendez	02:06
5.	"Epic Anthem"	Lockdown 2014	02:52
6.	"Wreaking Havok"	Havok	02:37
7.	"Sinister"	Impact Wrestling	01:51
8.	"Carnivool"	The Menagerie	02:53
9.	"Stampede"	Rhino	02:08
10.	"Japan Rising Sun"	Sanada	02:49
11.	"Chief of Staff"	Spud	01:43
12.	"East of the Orient"	The Great Muta	02:41
13.	"Tigre Uno"	Tigre Uno	02:00
14.	"Knock You Down"	TNA Knockouts	02:58
15.	"Submission Hold"	Von Erichs	02:20

== Rawk On! ==
Rawk On!

Compilation album by Total Nonstop Action Wrestling
- Released: February 13, 2015
- Genre: Rock
- Labels: TNA Knockout Music, LLC
- Producer: Dale Oliver / Serg Salinas

Rawk On! is the twelfth album released from Total Nonstop Action Wrestling on February 13, 2015. It is a digital release and has not been released physically (CD).

=== Track listing ===
All music is composed by Dale Oliver.

No.	Title	Subject	Length
1.	"Sojo Bolt"	Sojo Bolt	03:16
2.	"Empire March"	Awesome Kong	02:04
3.	"Girls Gotta Booty" (Featuring Kaylan Loyd)	Brooke Tessmacher	02:36
4.	"Girls Gotta Booty" (Instrumental)	Brooke Tessmacher	02:39
5.	"Not a Stranger to the Danger" (Featuring Charlie Sheets)	Crimson	02:50
6.	"Not a Stranger to the Danger" (Instrumental)	Crimson	02:50
7.	"Blood and Fire"	Eric Young	02:12
8.	"Mo Rock"	Hamada	02:14
9.	"It’s the Night"	Kenny King	01:50
10.	"Calling London Town"	Spud	02:39

== POP (Past or Present) ==
POP (Past Or Present)

Compilation album by Total Nonstop Action Wrestling
- Released: December 28, 2015
- Genre: Rock
- Labels: TNA Knockout Music, LLC
- Producer: Dale Oliver / Serg Salinas

POP (Past or Present) is the thirteenth album released from Total Nonstop Action Wrestling on December 28, 2015. It is a digital release and has not been released physically (CD).

=== Track listing ===
All music is composed by Dale Oliver.

No.	Title	Subject	Length
1.	"Well Oiled Machine"	Velvet Sky	02:21
2.	"Twin Engines"	Taeler Hendrix	02:23
3.	"SPUD Theme"	Rockstar Spud	03:11
4.	"Here Comes the Boom"	Robbie E	02:04
5.	"Hamada Theme"	Hamada	02:14
6.	"A Grado I Have Made"	Grado	01:38
7.	"DJZ Dubstep" (Rock Star Version)	DJZ	02:00
8.	"Dirty Heels Theme"	Dirty Heels	02:34
9.	"Ignite the Fire"	Destination X 2012	02:05
10.	"Hell on Heels"	Chyna	02:38
11.	"Booty Rocks"	Brooke	02:36

== Blue ==
Blue

Compilation album by Global Force Wrestling
- Released: May 23, 2017
- Genres: Rock; Hip hop Punk
- Label: Impact Wrestling Music (independent)
- Producer: Dale Oliver

Blue is the fourteenth album released from Impact Wrestling on May 23, 2017. It is a digital release and has not been released physically (CD).

=== Track listing ===
All music is composed by Dale Oliver.

No.	Title	Subject	Length
1.	"Fire & Brimstone"	Lashley	02:47
2.	"Eyes of a Hunter"	Davey Richards	03:27
3.	"When the Smokes Clears" (Featuring Ducky Medlock and Vencent Hickerson)	DCC	02:31
4.	"Left Behind" (Featuring Kenneth Nixon)	Decay	03:07
5.	"Eli Drake"	Eli Drake	01:39
6.	"Jersey Streets"	KM	01:41
7.	"Monster"	Kongo Kong	03:36
8.	"Hate"	Reno Scum	02:26
9.	"Dynasty"	Shane Helms	01:57
10.	"Under Attack"	Tyrus	02:23

== Green ==
Green

Compilation album by Global Force Wrestling
- Released: May 23, 2017
- Genres: Rock; Hip hop
- Label: Impact Wrestling Music (independent)
- Producer: Dale Oliver

Green is the fifteenth album released from Impact Wrestling on May 23, 2017. It is a digital release and has not been released physically (CD).

=== Track listing ===
All music is composed by Dale Oliver.

No.	Title	Subject	Length
1.	"Power of Mexico"	Alberto El Patrón	02:03
2.	"Riser"	DJZ	02:05
3.	"Feel the Beast"	Eddie Edwards	02:13
4.	"Notorious"	IMPACT! Wrestling 2017 Theme	02:03
5.	"LAX" (Featuring Serg Salinas and Konnan)	The Latin American Xchange	02:37
6.	"Getcya"	Marshe Rockett	02:40
7.	"Starman"	Matt Sydal	01:55
8.	"Hollywood Hills"	ONO Theme	02:29
9.	"Guru"	Sonjay Dutt	01:58
10.	"VOW"	Veterans of War	02:27

== Red ==
Red

Compilation album by Global Force Wrestling
- Released: May 23, 2017
- Genre: Rock
- Label: Impact Wrestling Music (independent)
- Producer: Dale Oliver

Red is the sixteenth album released from Impact Wrestling on May 23, 2017. It is a digital release and has not been released physically (CD).

=== Track listing ===
All music is composed by Dale Oliver.

No.	Title	Subject	Length
1.	"Screaming in Silence"	Alisha	02:56
2.	"Don't Lie to Me"	Allie	02:24
3.	"Tattooed Angel"	Angelina Love	02:58
4.	"Punk It!"	Ava Storie	02:12
5.	"Christina Von Eerie"	Christina Von Eerie	01:35
6.	"When Stars Clash Legends Emerge"	Knockouts Theme 2015	02:11
7.	"Laurel Van Ness"	Laurel Van Ness	02:36
8.	"Disturbance"	Rebel	01:59
9.	"Creepy"	Santana Garrett	01:51
10.	"Anvil"	Sienna	02:23

== DV8 ==
DV8

EP by Global Force Wrestling
- Released: September 13, 2017
- Genres: Rock; Hip hop
- Label: Impact Wrestling Music (independent)
- Producer: Dale Oliver

DV8 is the seventeenth album released from Global Force Wrestling on September 13, 2017. It is a digital release and has not been released physically (CD).

=== Track listing ===
All music is composed by Dale Oliver.

No.	Title	Subject	Length
1.	"Dezmond Xavier 2017"	Dezmond Xavier	02:05
2.	"From the Tombs"	Idris Abraham	02:02
3.	"Beast of the Best"	Jessie Godderz	02:51
4.	"American Luchadore"	Johnny Impact	02:24
5.	"OVE Theme"	oVe	01:41
6.	"Roar of the Lion"	Mahabali Shera	02:09
7.	"Taya"	Taya Valkyrie	02:26
8.	"Every Day Nightmare"	Taryn Terrell	02:42

== See also ==
- Impact Wrestling Music
- Music in professional wrestling
