= The Sinister Urge =

The Sinister Urge may refer to:

- The Sinister Urge (film), a 1960 film by Ed Wood
- The Sinister Urge (album), a 2001 album by Rob Zombie
