= Bentley EXP 10 Speed 6 =

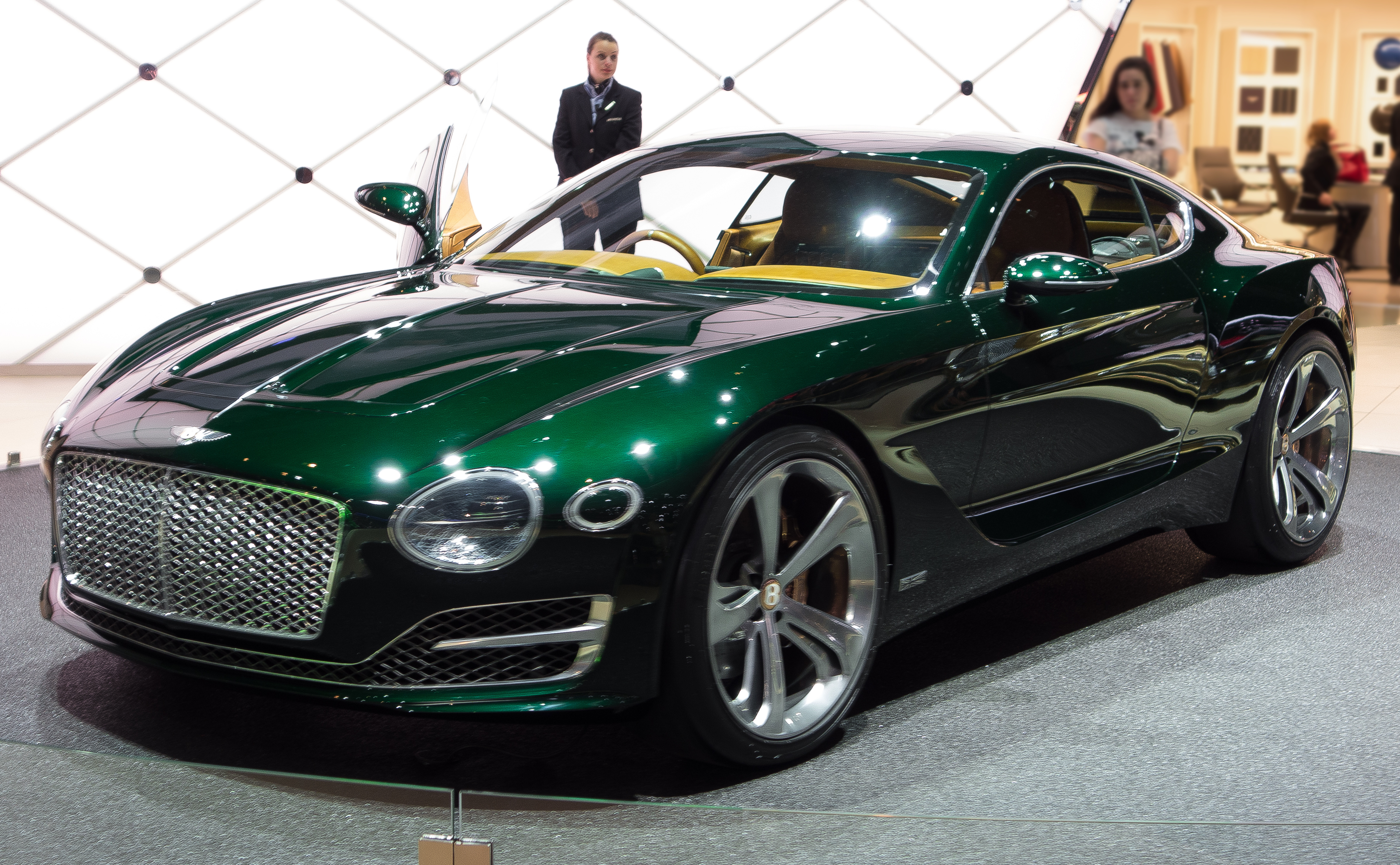
- The Bentley EXP 10 Speed 6 concept at the 2015 Geneva Motor Show

Overview
- Manufacturer: Bentley Motors Limited
- Production: 2015 (concept car)
- Assembly: Crewe, England, United Kingdom (Bentley Crewe)
- Designer: Exterior: John Paul Gregory, Barney Vernon, Bora Kim, Xavier Domontier; Interior: Bret Boydell, Aron Prost, Jonnathan Punter (layout)

Body and chassis
- Class: Grand tourer (S)
- Body style: 2-door coupé
- Layout: F4 layout
- Doors: Swan doors

Powertrain
- Engine: 3.0L EA839 (CZSE) Turbo V6
- Electric motor: Permanent Magnet Synchronous Electric
- Hybrid drivetrain: PHEV

The Bentley EXP 10 Speed 6 is a hybrid concept car by Bentley launched in 2015 at the Geneva Motor Show.

While it has not entered production, its design heavily inspired the 2018 Bentley Continental.

== Overview ==
The Bentley EXP 10 is two seat coupe that is smaller than the Bentley Continental GT at the time. It takes its name from the 6½lit. Bentley Speed Six of the late 1920s. The project was managed by Bentley's head of design, Luc Donckerwolke.

== Design ==
The Bentley EXP 10 Speed Six represented a new design direction for Bentley, and was a significant departure from the brand's previous styling language at the time. The Speed 6 retains Bentley's signature dual round full-LED headlamps, but the main headlamp is almost an oval-shape, but when seen from head-on it appears to be perfectly round. The second headlamps is similar to the second headlamps of the Bentayga and Mulsanne, and is smaller than the main headlamp and features an integrated headlamp-washer.

The rear tail-lights were also unique. The taillights are red-coloured glass and are in an oval shape, they protrude from the rear of the car and are full-LED taillights, and their shape is almost exactly the same shape as seen in the Speed Six's wide dual tailpipes.

The Speed Six was Bentley's first two-seater, and it featured an aerodynamic design with many different creases and lines in its body, and Bentley's signature "Flying B" design element has been the inspiration for the b-shaped crease on the Speed Six's side panels and doors. And a Flying B side-grille is present as well.

Additionally, the Speed 6 is Bentley's first use of 3D printing, with parts of the grille and other parts of the body being 3D-printed. The grille is Bentley's signature mesh-like grille, and features for the first-time a "3D design". The Speed 6 is still a coachbuilt and mostly-handmade car, just as other Bentley's are.

Inside the Speed 6 features several curved OLED displays, the first use of curved and OLED technology in a Bentley. For a car of its class, it features an unprecedented amount of leather, wood veneers, bespoke options, and interior appointments compared to its potential rivals including the Lamborghini Huracán, Jaguar F-Type, Porsche 911, Ferrari California, and others.

The Speed Six would eventually inspire the design language of the most recent Bentley products, most notably the 2018 Continental.

== Powertrain ==
The concept car featured a V6 plug-in hybrid powertrain, the first V6 plug-in hybrid powertrain ever used in a Bentley concept or production vehicle (a V8 plug-in hybrid was used in the Mulsanne Hybrid Concept in 2014).

== Gallery ==
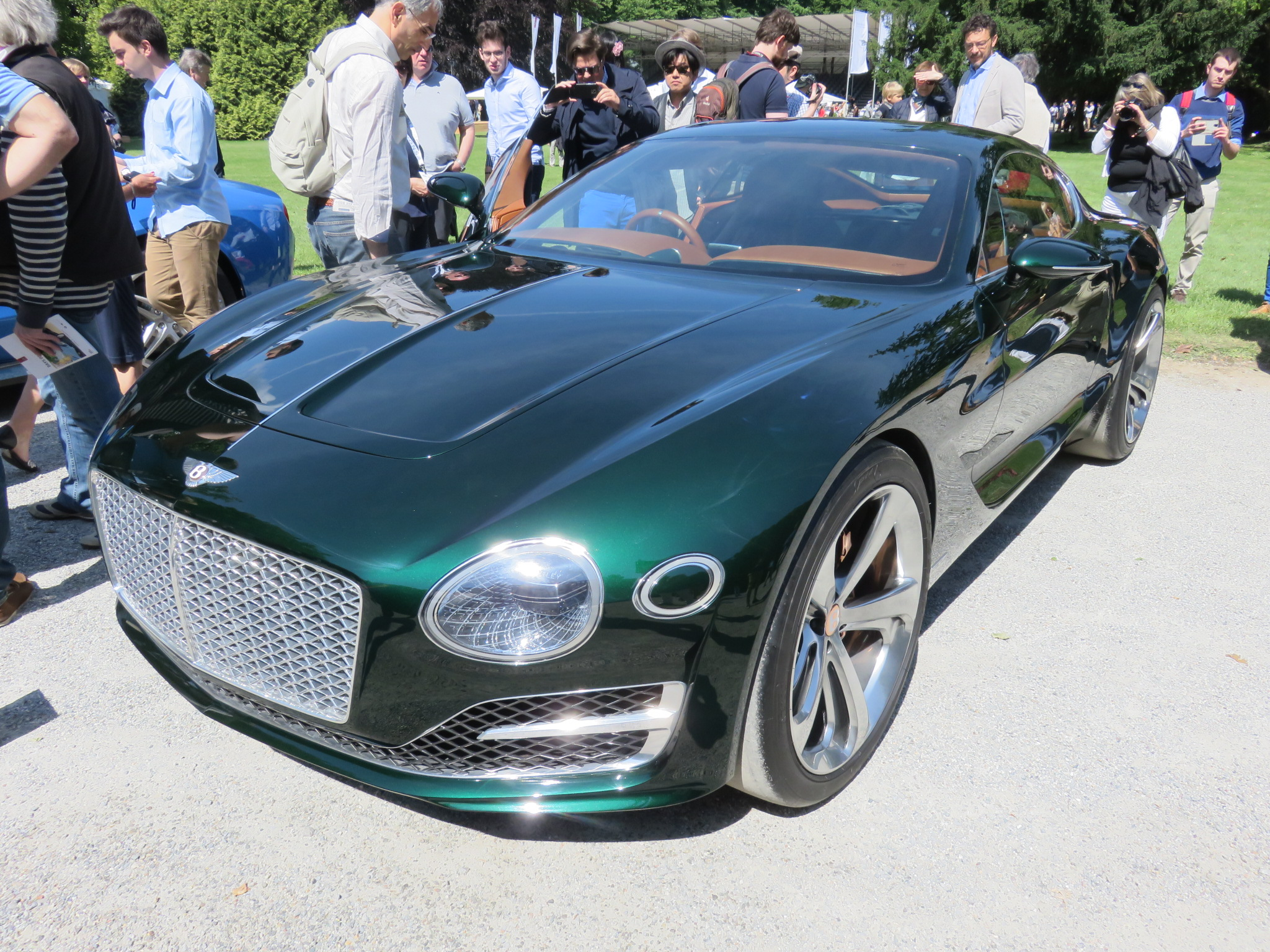

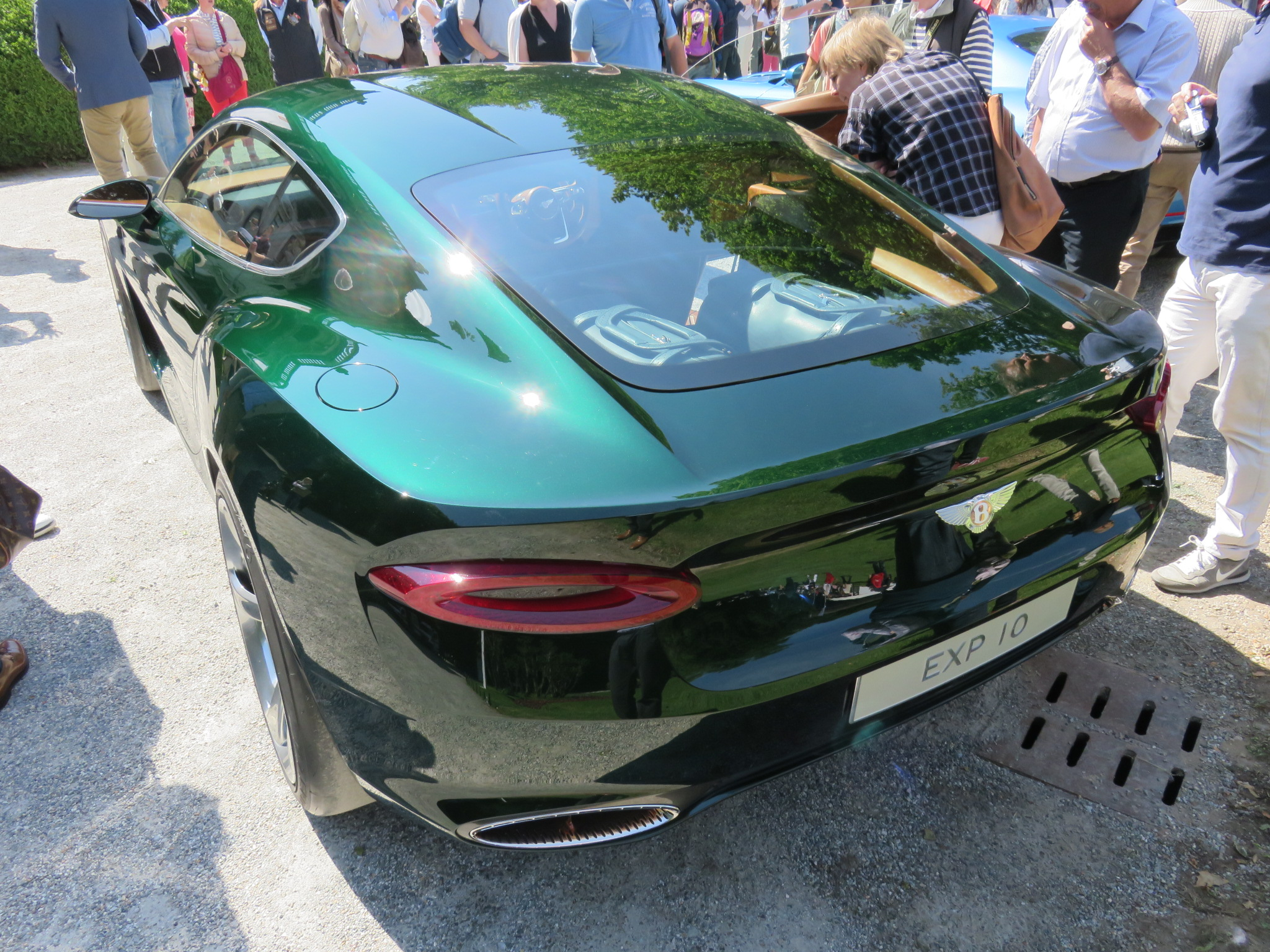

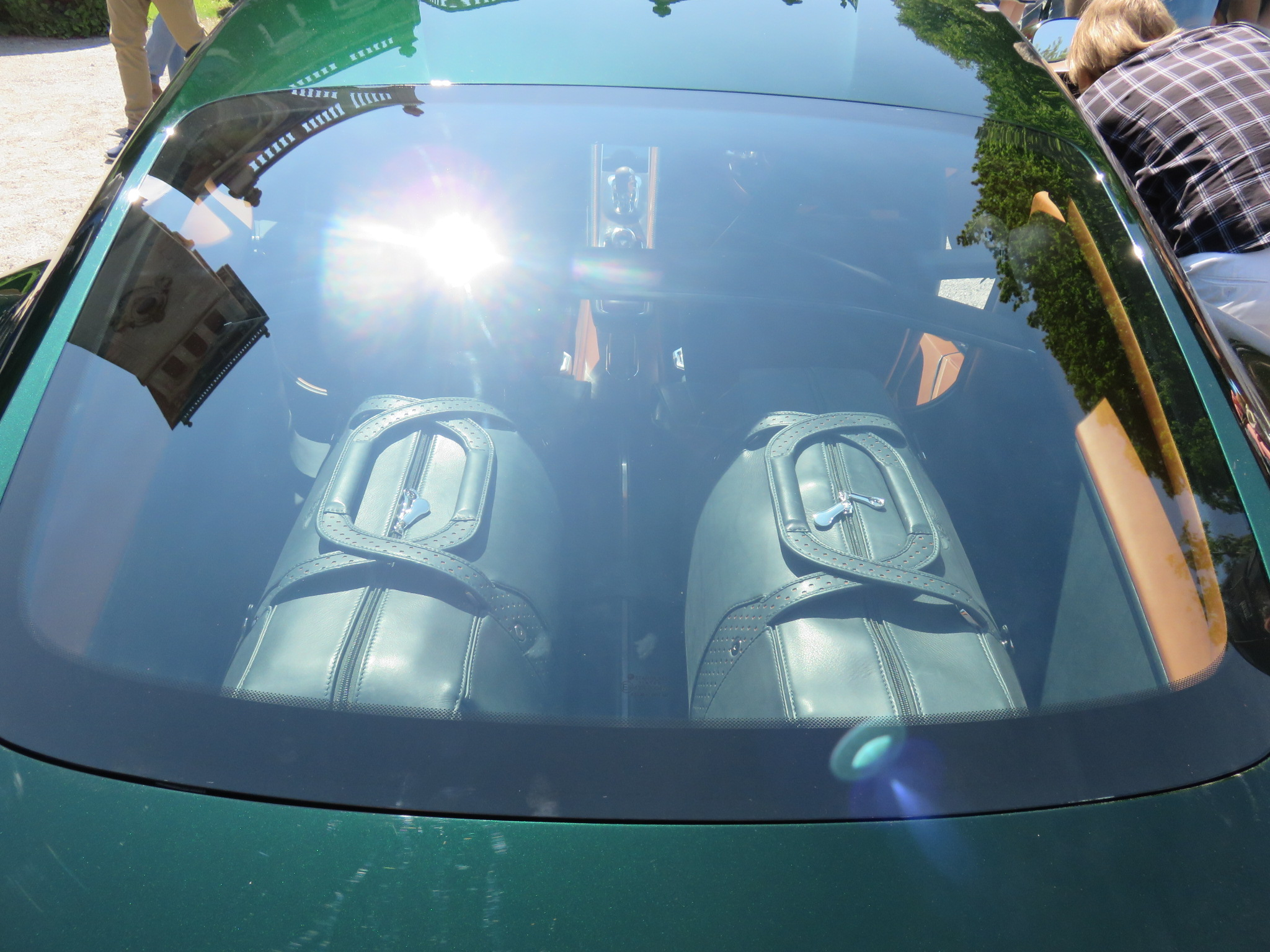

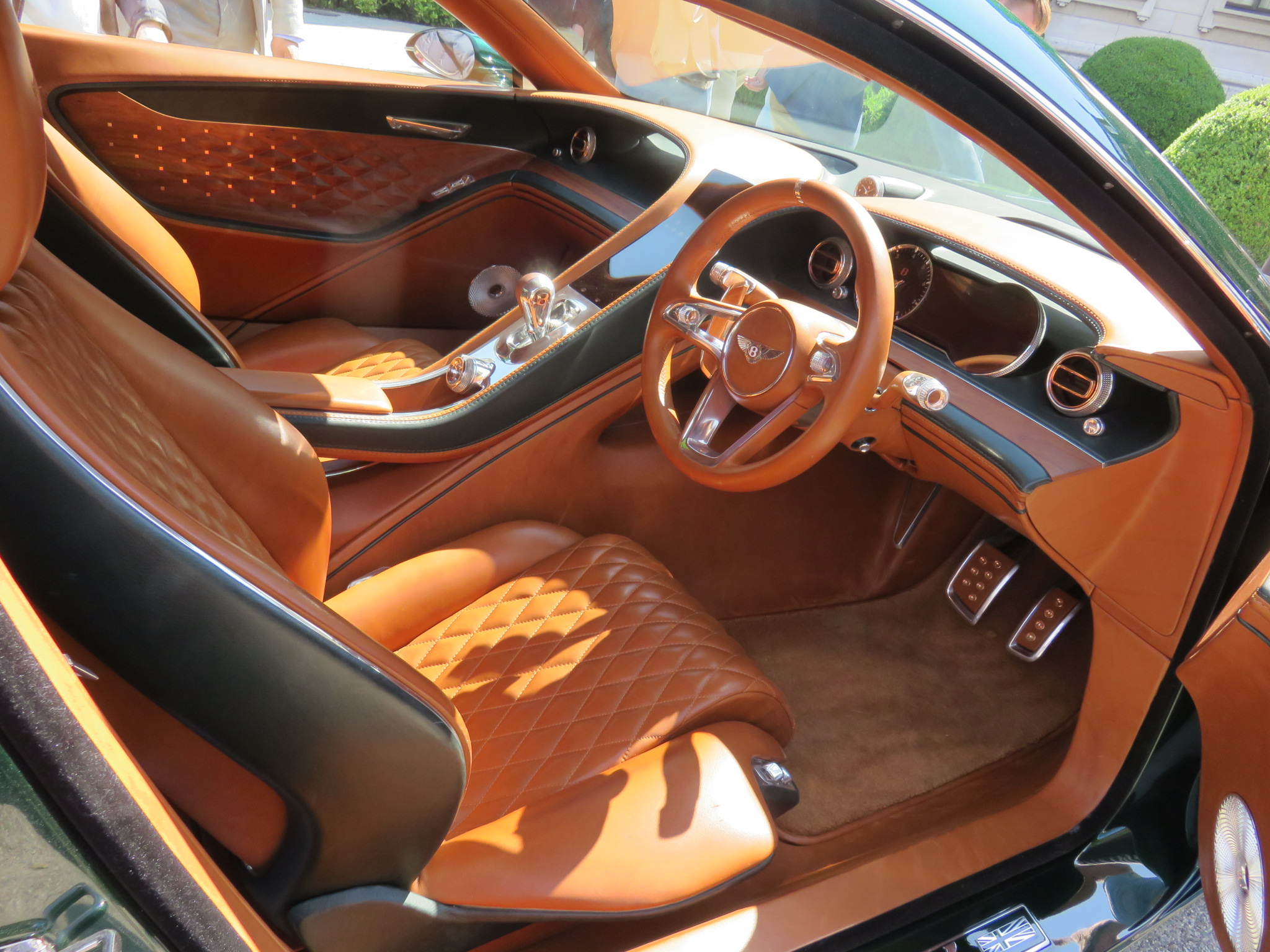
