= Urgency (The Pale Pacific album) =

Studio album by The Pale Pacific
- Released: August 23, 2005
- Genre: Indie rock Power pop
- Length: 45:24
- Label: SideCho Records

The Pale Pacific chronology
Rules Are Predictable EP (2005)	Urgency (2005)

Urgency is an album by Bellingham, Washington indie rock band The Pale Pacific (formerly The Pale). Their fourth release, it was published by SideCho Records on August 23, 2005

== Track listing ==
1. "In the Sun, Pt. 2" – 2:01
2. "Sucker Punch" – 5:17
3. "Tied to a Million Things" – 3:54
4. "Identity Theft" – 3:14
5. "Fortune Folds" – 4:38
6. "Your Parent's House" – 4:04
7. "Written Down" – 3:54
8. "The Strangest Second Chance" – 2:43
9. "If Only She'd Leave Town" – 4:11
10. "Back to You" – 3:12
11. "Fall to Place" – 8:16
